= Narong Kittikachorn =

Thai colonel (1933–2024)

- ณรงค์ กิตติขจร
- Born: 21 October 1933; Bangkok, Thailand
- Died: 14 May 2024 (aged 90); Phramongkutklao Hospital, Bangkok, Thailand
- Education: Chulachomklao Royal Military Academy
- Spouse: Supaporn Kittikachorn (1940-2005)
- Children: 4
- Parents: Thanom Kittikachorn (father); Jongkol Kittikachorn (mother)

Narong Kittikachorn (ณรงค์ กิตติขจร, 21 October 1933 – 14 May 2024) was a former Thai politician. He was also the son of Field Marshal Thanom Kittikachorn, former Prime Minister of Thailand. Before entering politics he was a military commander with the rank of Commander in Chief. Narong Kittikachorn was also the son-in-law of Field Marshal Praphas Charusathien, a former army commander and senior minister.

== Background ==
Narong was born on 21 October 1933, the son of Thanom Kittikachorn and Jongkol Kittikachorn. He graduated from Suankularb Wittayalai School, then studied at Chulachomklao Royal Military Academy, and then the Royal Military Academy Sandhurst.

Narong Kittikachorn was also the son-in-law of Field Marshal Praphas Charusathien, having married his wife Supaporn, the third daughter of Field Marshal Praphas and Sawai Jarusathien. Together they had four children. Narong died on 14 May 2024, at the age of 90.

== Government service ==
Narong Kittikachorn served as assistant secretary-general of the coup junta in 1971. When the coup was over, he held the position of Deputy Secretary-General, Commission on Inspecting and Monitoring of Official performance and was the commander of the 2nd Battalion, 11th Infantry Regiment, The King's Guard.

After the 1973 Thai popular uprising, Narong left Thailand with Thanom and Praphas before traveling back to Thailand at a later time.

== Political career ==
After the political situation calmed down Narong returned to Thailand and became a member of the Thai Nation Party and was elected as the Phra Nakhon Si Ayutthaya province MP in 1983. Later, Narong resigned from the Thai Nation Party and was a member of the Liberal Party and accepted the position of party leader and was elected as the 2nd Phra Nakhon Si Ayutthaya MP in 1986 and the 3rd term in 1988. The 3rd period was still under the Liberal Party before resigning from the Liberal Party and laying a political hand in 1992.

== Honours ==
received the following royal decorations in the Honours System of Thailand :

- Knight Grand Cross of the Most Exalted Order of the White Elephant (1989)
- Knight Grand Cross of the Most Noble Order of the Crown of Thailand (1987)
- Companion of the Most Illustrious Order of Chula Chom Klao (1962)
- Bravery Medal (1969)
- Victory Medal - Korean War (1961)
- Victory Medal - Vietnam War, with flames (1969)
- Freemen Safeguarding Medal, 2nd Class 1st Cat
- Chakra Mala Medal
- King Rama IX Royal Cypher Medal, Fifth Class (1964)
- Red Cross Medal of Merit

=== Foreign honours ===
- South Vietnam :
  - Gallantry Cross With Gold Star (1968)
  - Vietnam Armed Forces Honor Medal (1968)
  - Vietnam Staff Service Medal, First Class (1968)
  - Vietnam Campaign Medal (1968)
- USA :
  - Silver Star Medal (1968)
- South Korea :
  - Order of Military Merit, Chungmu Medal (1968)

== See also ==
- Liberal Party (Thailand)
- Thammasat University massacre
