= Manoonkrit Roopkachorn =

Thai former senator and military officer (born 1935)

- มนูญกฤต รูปขจร
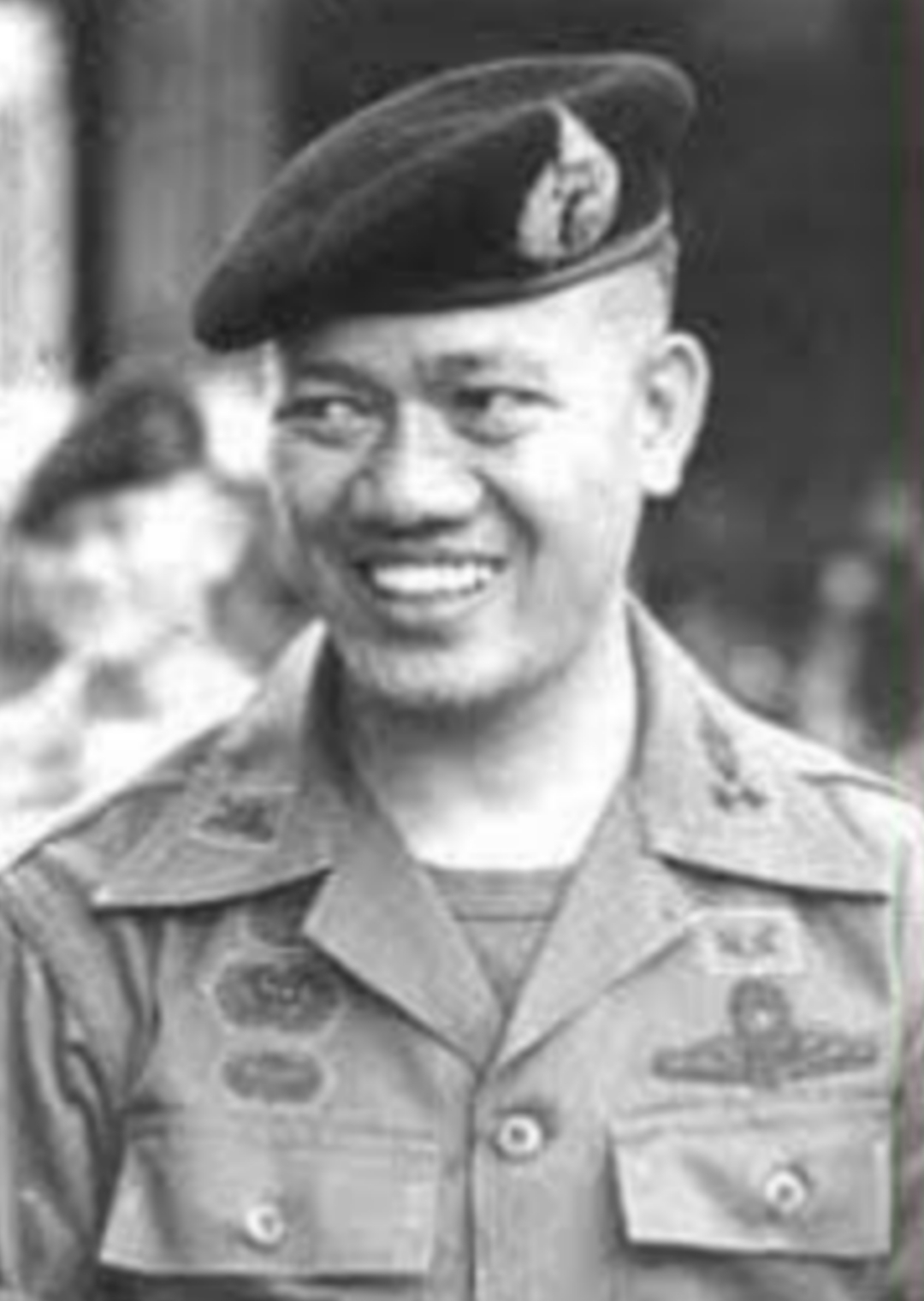
- Manoonkrit in 1976
- Born: Manoon Roopkachorn; 15 December 1935; Ayutthaya, Thailand
- Military career
- Allegiance: Thailand
- Branch: Royal Thai Army
- Service years: 1966–1985
- Rank: Major General

President of the Senate
- In office 30 March 2001 – 5 March 2004
- Preceded by: Sanit Vorapanya
- Succeeded by: Suchon Chaleekure

Major General Manoonkrit Roopkachorn (Thai: มนูญกฤต รูปขจร, RTGS: Manunkrit Rupkhachon; born Manoon Roopkachorn, 15 December 1935 in Ayutthaya Province) is a former Thai military officer, senator and President of the Senate of Thailand. A leader of the "Young Turks" clique of military officers, he took part in the coups of 1976 and 1977, in the unsuccessful coups of 1981 and 1985, and in the 2002 corruption case of Prime Minister Thaksin Shinawatra.

== Early life and career ==
Manoon graduated from the Chulachomklao Royal Military Academy in Class 7, along with classmates Sanan Kachornprasart, Chamlong Srimuang, and Pallop Pinmanee. He began serving the Thai military in 1966.

== Attempted coup of 1981 ==
Important military factions in the early-1980s included the Young Turks; the fifth class of the Chulachomklao Royal Military Academy led by Suchinda Kraprayoon; the "Democratic Soldiers", mostly staff officers in counter-insurgency planning; and the military leadership, such as Generals Arthit Kamlang-ek and Phichit Kullavanich, both with close ties to the palace, and Chavalit Yongchaiyudh, a loyalist to Prime Minister General Prem Tinsulanonda. The Young Turks were increasingly frustrated by the military leadership, which they claim had "allowed themselves to be subservient to the rotten political system just to live happily with benefits handed to them by (corrupt) politicians."

On 1 April 1981, the Young Turks took over Bangkok in a bloodless coup, without informing King Bhumibol Adulyadej in advance, as had sometimes happened. The Thai royal family immediately fled to Nakhon Ratchasima Province, along with Prime Minister Prem Tinsulanonda. With royal support for the government thus made clear, Arthit Kamlang-ek led troops loyal to Chavalit Yongchaiyudh and Chulachomklao Royal Military Academy Class 5 in a bloodless counter-coup that recaptured the capital. The coup attempt later became known as the April Fool's Day Coup or the Mesa Hawaii (Thai: เมษาฮาวาย) Coup.

== Attempted coup of 1985 ==
On 9 September 1985, the Young Turks again unsuccessfully attempted to topple the government of General Prem, although Prem was abroad at the time. Led by Manoon and his brother, Wing Commander Manas Roopkachorn, he was supported by former Prime Minister Kriangsak Chomanan, former Supreme Commander General Serm Na Nakhon, former Army chief General Yos Thephasdin, former Air Force chief marshal Krasae Intharat and former Air Force chief marshal Arun Promthep. The pre-dawn coup consisted of several hundred men and twenty-two tanks. Within 10 hours, government troops led by General Chavalit Yongchaiyudh quelled the bloody rebellion. There are 59 injuries, 5 casualties, 2 of them foreign journalists. Over 40 active and former military officers were arrested. Exiled pyramid scheme operator Ekkayuth Anchanbutr was widely cited as a financier of the coup, leading some to call the coup the "Share Rebellion". Manoon left Thailand and was dismissed from the service.

== Return to Thailand ==
Manoonkrit returned to Thai politics in the mid-1990s as an advisor to classmate Maj. Gen. Sanan Kachornprasart of the Democrat Party.

== Senator and Senate Speaker ==
Manoonkrit ran for the seat of Senator of Saraburi province on 4 March 2001. He won 140,000 votes, but was disqualified after being accused of buying votes. Manoonkrit won again in the second round of voting on 29 April. His victory was later endorsed due to lack of evidence of fraud.

Manoonkrit won a majority 114 votes in a secret ballot over three other candidates for Speaker of the 200-member Senate.

== Thaksin's 2002 corruption case ==
Senate Speaker Manoonkrit, citing a petition signed by some 60,000 people, forwarded a formal request to the National Counter Corruption Commission (NCCC) to investigate four Constitutional Court of Thailand judges: Kramol Thongdharmachart, Phan Chanpan, Sak Techacharn, and Jumpol na Songkhla in connection with their rulings on the asset concealment case against Prime Minister Thaksin Shinawatra, which then triggered major legal questions and a constitutional paradox. President Uthai Pimchaichon, who was also speaker of the House of Representatives, asked the Constitutional Court to block the investigation launched by the NCCC. "Apart from the tough questions of whether the NCCC was empowered to investigate Constitutional Court judges, and whether the court could stop such a probe, the country was threatened with parallel showdowns between key political institutions—NCCC versus the Constitutional Court and the Senate versus the House of Representatives. The Administrative Court was also dragged into the fray, following a petition by three of the investigated judges."

== Resignation ==
On 20 May 2003, Manoonkrit announced his resignation from the posts of Senator and Speaker effective on 4 January 2004, after some members of the upper house tried to force him to step down following a debate calling for an evaluation of his performance. His opponents said he made a promise, during his campaign, to stay in post for two years, so he decided to step down two years before his terms expired in 2006.

== Honours ==
Manoonkrit received the following royal decorations in the Honours System of Thailand :

- Knight Grand Cordon of the Most Exalted Order of the White Elephant
- Knight Grand Cordon of the Most Noble Order of the Crown
- Victory Medal - Vietnam War, with flames
- Freemen Safeguarding Medal
- Border Service Medal
- Chakra Mala Medal

=== Foreign honours ===
- South Vietnam:
  - Armed Forces Honor Medal, First class (1970)
  - Vietnam Campaign Medal (1970)

==== Unit Citation ====
- Army Meritorious Unit Commendation (1970)
- Gallantry Cross Unit Citation (1970)
