= Pallop Pinmanee =

Thai Army general

- พัลลภ ปิ่นมณี
- Born: 25 May 1936 (age 90); Sam Phran, Nakhon Pathom, Thailand
- Alma mater: Chulachomklao Royal Military Academy; Royal Thai Army Command and General Staff College
- Spouse: Khunying Naruedee Pinmanee
- Military career
- Allegiance: Thailand
- Branch: Royal Thai Army
- Service years: 1964–1996
- Rank: General
- Units: 1st King's Own Bodyguard Regiment; 9th Infantry Division; Royal Thai Army Special Warfare Command
- Commands: Internal Security Operations Command
- Conflicts: Cold War; Cold War in Asia; Vietnam War; Laotian Civil War; Communist insurgency in Thailand; Communist insurgency in Malaysia; Vietnamese border raids in Thailand; Southern Insurgency

Personal details
- Party: Democrat Party (1996); Pheu Thai Party (2018–)

Pallop Pinmanee (Thai: พัลลภ ปิ่นมณี,RTGS: Phanlop Pinmani, born 25 May 1936 in Sam Phran, Nakhon Pathom as Amnat Pinmanee (Thai: อำนาจ ปิ่นมณี, RTGS: Amnat Pinmani)) is a retired Thai Army general who took part in several coups, ordered the massacre of insurgents at Krue Sae Mosque and allegedly played a role in the attempted car-bomb assassination of Prime Minister Thaksin Shinawatra. After a 2006 military coup overthrew Thaksin, the military junta appointed Pallop public relations adviser to the Internal Security Operations Command of Thailand. He eventually switched sides and became an adviser to Thaksin's younger sister Yingluck Shinawatra while she was serving as prime minister.

== Military career ==
Pallop was a member of Class Seven of the Chulachomklao Royal Military Academy, the "young Turks", where he befriended classmate Chamlong Srimuang. He began his military career as a commando and self-professed assassin. With his young Turk classmates, Pallop was involved in successful military coups against the governments of Seni Pramoj and Tanin Kraivixien and an unsuccessful April Fool's Day 1981 coup against the government of Prem Tinsulanonda. He also admitted masterminding a number of assassination attempts against General Arthit Kamlang-ek, commander of the Army under Prem.

He participated in guerrilla-warfare missions in Laos in 1966 and 1967 and was appointed chief of the Special Thai Ranger Army, a volunteer unit which carried out clandestine, anti-communist guerrilla operations financed by the US Central Intelligence Agency against the North Vietnamese Army along the Ho Chi Minh Trail in the Kingdom of Laos, in 1968. Two years later, he was appointed leader of a secret seven-man unit which carried out extrajudicial killings. "The assignment was to kill the leaders of communist groups all over Thailand", he told a reporter, and claimed to have assassinated many suspected communists.

Pallop was appointed a senator by the military-led government in 1979, and became commander of the 19th Infantry Regiment the following year. He participated in operations along the Thai-Cambodian border in 1986 and 1987.

He was involved in several coups. With other members of the Young Turks, he helped topple the elected government of Seni Pramoj after the massacre of 6 October 1976. Pallop also participated in the 1977 coup against the ultra-conservative government of Tanin Kraivixien. During the Prem government, the Young Turks tried to seize power on 1 April 1981. When it became clear that the royal family continued to support Prem, the coup failed; although Pallop fled to the Lao People's Democratic Republic to escape punishment, he was jailed for two months by the Laotian government. He later admitted masterminding a number of assassination attempts against General Arthit Kamlang-ek, commander of the army in Prem's administration.

Although Pallop was rehabilitated and retired from the Royal Thai Army with the rank of general in 1996, he was appointed deputy director-general of the Internal Security Operations Command. In this position, he ordered military forces to storm the Krue Sae Mosque during a standoff with southern insurgents.

== Krue Sae mosque incident ==
Pallop was appointed commander of the Southern Peace Enhancement Center to deal with insurgency in southern Thailand. On 28 April 2004, more than 100 militants carried out attacks against 10 police stations across Pattani, Yala and Songkhla provinces in southern Thailand. Thirty-two insurgents retreated to the Krue Sae Mosque, the main mosque in Pattani. A seven-hour standoff ended when Pallop, the senior army commander on the scene, ordered an assault on the mosque; all the insurgents were killed. He later said, "I had no choice. I was afraid that as time passed the crowd would become sympathetic to the insurgents, to the point of trying to rescue them."

It was learned that Pallop's order to storm the mosque contravened an order by defense minister Chavalit Yongchaiyudh to seek a peaceful resolution to the standoff, regardless of how long it took. Pallop was immediately ordered out of the area, and later tendered his resignation as commander of the Southern Peace Enhancement Center. The forward command of the Internal Security Operations Command (ISOC), which Pallop headed, was also dissolved. Although a governmental investigative commission found that security forces had overreacted, the Asian Centre for Human Rights questioned the commission's independence and impartiality. During a 3 May 2004 Senate hearing, Senator Kraisak Choonhavan noted that most of those killed at Krue Se Mosque were shot in the head and had signs that their wrists had been tied. The incident sparked conflict between Pallop and Defense Minister Chavalit (who was also director of the ISOC), and Pallop later demanded that the defense minister end his involvement in managing the southern insurgency. General Chavalit Yongchaiyudh compared Pallop to American General Douglas MacArthur.

== Opposition to Thaksin Shinawatra ==
Pallop is critical of former prime minister Thaksin Shinawatra. During protests against Thaksin in early 2006, Pallop said: "As a real friend and former classmate from military school, I fully support Chamlong (Srimuang) in his move [to oust Thaksin]". He also threatened Thaksin with a military coup if Thaksin did not resign from the premiership.

=== Assassination plot ===
Pallop was dismissed from his ISOC deputy-director position after Thawatchai Klinchana, his driver, was found driving a car containing 4.5 kg of explosives near Thaksin's residence. According to Metropolitan Police Bureau commissioner Wiroj Jantharangsee, the explosives were assembled, equipped with a remote sensor and ready to be detonated. Kamthorn Ooycharoen, head of the police bomb-disposal squad at the scene, confirmed that the bomb was ready for detonation. It was composed of a remote control unit, M-8 military fuses, sticks of TNT, C-4 plastic explosives, and nine plastic containers containing ammonium nitrate fuel oil (ANFO).

Pallop denied any involvement: "If had wanted to do it, I would have done it more subtly. In my career, I have led death squads. If I had wanted to kill him, the prime minister would not have escaped".' According to him, "The explosives were being transported; they were not assembled to be detonated."

A military coup overthrew the Thaksin government on 19 September 2006, and the junta appointed Pallop public-relations adviser to the ISOC in May 2007. He promised to use "secret tricks" and negotiation, avoiding violent clashes: "Don't see me as a man who favours violence".

== Support for Thaksin Shinawatra ==
Prior to the 2011 election Pallop eventually changed sides and joined the pro-Thaksin Pheu Thai Party as well as its associated activist group United Front for Democracy Against Dictatorship (UDD, also known as the 'Red Shirts'). However a highly public falling out with the leaders of the UDD, over tactics in 2010, ended his role within the latter organisation. He also served as an advisor to Thaksin's sister Prime Minister Yingluck Shinawatra.

In 2012 Pallop as a security adviser to the prime minister, says he plans to bring former premier Thaksin Shinawatra back to Thailand that year. Pallop proposed the collecting of 20,000 signatures to submit an amnesty bill to parliament, as one way to bring Thaksin back if the national reconciliation proposal by the King Prajadhipok Institute does not result in an amnesty for the exiled politician. Pallop said the Pheu Thai Party promised an amnesty bill allowing Thaksin to come back, during the election campaign in Buri Ram last year, and the pledge must be fulfilled. Pallop was confident the bill would pass parliament. Pallop also divulged that he had met Thaksin in person and that he had agreed with the idea of the amnesty bill. The failure of the amnesty bill led to the 2013–2014 Thai political crisis.

During the political crisis which began in October 2013, Pallop told the media in late February 2014 that he had been asked by the caretaker government (under Yingluck) to join the Centre for Maintaining Peace and Order (CMPO). He was also recruited as an advisor to a new movement led by Suporn Attawong, Deputy secretary-general to the prime minister and red-shirt leader. Suporn planned to recruit 600,000 young men to join the new pro-government Democracy Protection Volunteers Group as an opposition to the People's Democratic Reform Committee. According to an Australian academic, Pallop was recruited to advise on dealing with "men in black" gunmen at protests; the term originated during the 2010 crackdown on red-shirt supporters, when mysterious armed figures emerged. Military sources have said that the "men in black" may be mercenaries.

Pallop is opposed to the National Council for Peace and Order, the ruling junta since 2014.

== Election ==
Pallop used to run for election in constituency one Bangkok (districts of Dusit, Bang Sue, Ratchathewi), belongs to the Democrat Party in the general election at the end of 1996, but was not elected.

== Personal life ==
Pallop is married to Khunying Naruedee Pinmanee, and has a son and two daughters.

== Military rank ==
- 1995 Lieutenant General of the Royal Thai Army
- 1996 General of the Royal Thai Army

== Honours ==
Pallop received the following royal decorations in the Honours System of Thailand :

- Knight Grand Cordon of the Most Exalted Order of the White Elephant
- Knight Grand Cordon of the Most Noble Order of the Crown
- Victory Medal - Vietnam War, with flames
- Freemen Safeguarding Medal, First Class
- Border Service Medal
- Chakra Mala Medal
