= 1981 Thai military rebellion =

1981 coup attempt in Thailand

Date	1 April 1981 – 3 April 1981 (3 days)
Location	Bangkok, Thailand
Result	Failed military takeover

Belligerents
(Thailand) 1st Army Area	Prem Cabinet (Thailand) Second, Third, Fourth Army Area (Thailand) Royal Thai Navy; Royal Thai Air Force Supported by: Monarchy of Thailand

Commanders and leaders
(Thailand) San Jitpathima (Thailand) Manoonkrit Roopkachorn	Prem Tinsulanonda (Thailand) Arthit Kamlang-ek

Units involved
(Thailand) 1st Army Area; 1st Division, King's Guard; 2nd Infantry Division, Queen Sirikit's Guard; 9th Infantry Division; 2nd Cavalry Division, King's Guard	(Thailand) 21st Infantry Regiment

The 1981 Thai military rebellion was a military coup attempt to consolidate power by the government of Prem Tinsulanonda, staged by Thai military leaders of Class 7 on 1 April 1981, but a counter-coup by Prem, Arthit Kamlang-ek, and support by the royal family on 3 April led to the coup's failure, turning it into a rebellion. In Thailand, it is known as the "Young Turk Rebellion" (Thai: กบฏยังเติร์ก, romanized: Kabot Yang Toek), referring to the group of military officers that led the coup, or more mockingly as the "April Fools' Day Rebellion" (Thai: กบฏเมษาฮาวาย, romanized: Kabot Mesa Hawai), referring to the date of the coup along with its failure. The coup attempt failed despite garnering the support of as many as 42 battalions, the most in Thai history.

== Background ==
Field officers from the Armed Forces Academies Preparatory School Class 7, known as the "Young Turks", including Manoonkrit Roopkachorn (Manoon Roopkachorn at that time), Prajak Sawangjit, and Pallop Pinmanee, were involved in 1976 Thai coup d'état as a significant force and helped Kriangsak Chamanan become prime minister. Later when Kriangsak became unpopular, they strongly supported and helped Prem Tinsulanonda, the northeast army leader, become Prime Minister of Thailand in 1980. Prem realized that he should not depend on Class 7 only and began to seek for another class's support.

== Prelude ==
On 31 March 1981, Class 7 leaders visited Prem in the night to ask him lead a coup on 1 April but Prem refused. Arthit Kamlang-ek, a deputy commander of the 2nd army region, was informed of the coup plan. Arthit telephoned Queen Sirikit. Sirikit then ordered the coup planning group to let Prem come to the royal palace.

== Coup ==
On 1 April 1981, Class 7 leaders led by San Jitpathima, deputy commander-in-chief of the army, staged a coup, calling themselves the "Revolutionary Council". Manoonkrit, secretary-general of the group, proclaimed reasons such as selfish politicians, social justice problems, and economic problems.

Prem went to Suranari Base of the 2nd Army Area in Nakhon Ratchasima Province with the Thai Royal Family, including King Bhumibol Adulyadej, in the morning, and set up a counter-coup with an assistance from Arthit. The influence of Royal Family helped Prem to get support from the second, third and fourth regional armies, the Royal Thai Navy, and the Royal Thai Air Force. The 21st Infantry Regiment, the Queen Guards, secretly entered Bangkok on 3 April and arrested the coup attempt leaders.

== Aftermath ==
Following the coup's failure, its leaders fled the country to various destinations. 52 were later given amnesty and had their military ranks restored. Having aided Prem in putting down the coup, Arthit was promoted to Commander of the 1st Army Area. Manoonkrit and the Young Turks would attempt another coup in 1985, which also failed.

== See also ==
- 1991 Thai coup d'état
