= Liberal Party (Thailand) =

Liberal Party พรรคเสรีนิยม
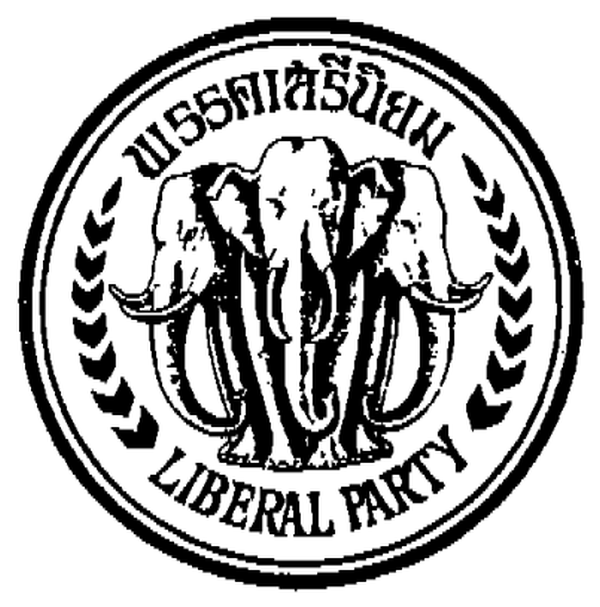
- Chairman: Seraneeporm Komlas (1982–86); Narong Kittikachorn (1986–92)
- Founded: 16 September 1982
- Dissolved: 8 January 1993
- Headquarters: Bangkok, Thailand

Liberal Party (Thai: พรรคเสรีนิยม; RTGS: Phak Seriniyom) was a political party in Thailand, active during the 1980s.

== History ==
The Liberal Party was founded by Seraneeporm Komlas on 16 September 1982 After Seraneeporm Komlas resigned the office of the party leader on 27 July 1986, Narong Kittikachorn son of Thanom Kittikachorn and son-in-law of former military dictator Praphas Charusathien became leader of the party. The party did not field any candidates for the March 1992 Thai general election and was dissolved on 8 January 1993.

== General election results ==
| Election | Total seats won | Total votes | Share of votes | Outcome of election | Election leader |
|---|---|---|---|---|---|
| 1983 | 0 / 324 | | 0 % | | Seraneeporm Komlas |
| 1986 | 1 / 347 | 404,960 | 1.1% | ▲1 seat | Narong Kittikachorn |
| 1988 | 3 / 357 | 690,486 | 1.7% | ▲2 seats | Narong Kittikachorn |
