= Phichit Kullavanich =

Thai army officer and Privy councilor

General Phichit Kullavanich DGC MPCh MVM AR
- พิจิตร กุลละวณิชย์
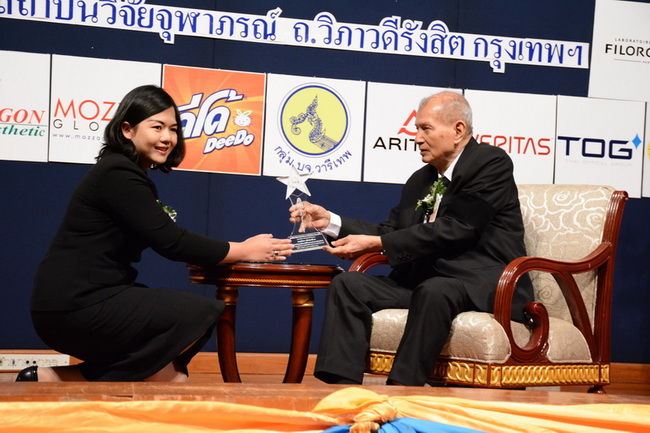
- Phichit Kullavanich (right) in 2016

Privy Councilor
- In office 13 July 1993 – 6 December 2016
- Monarch: Vajiralongkorn

Deputy Commander-in-chief of the Thai Royal Army
- In office 3 December 1990 – 4 April 1993

Personal details
- Born: July 6, 1932 (age 94) Chachoengsao, Siam
- Spouse(s): Arunnee Kunravanich (divorced); Wiimon Kunravanich

Military service
- Branch/service: Royal Thai Army
- Rank: General
- Battles/wars: Vietnam War

Phichit Kullavanich (Thai: พิจิตร กุลละวณิชย์; born 6 July 1932) is a Thai retired army officer and a former Privy councilor. He served as an assistant deputy commander-in-chief in 1986 and subsequently deputy commander-in-chief in 1990. He is an uncle of current Governor of Bangkok Chadchart Sittipunt.

== Early life ==
Phichit was born the oldest of 6 sibling on 6 July 2475 in Chachoengsao province to Chuan Kullavanich, a brother of Thailand former minister of Agriculture Pichai Kullavanich. Once finished a local primary education at Bangkok Christian College he attended and graduate from Chulachomklao Royal Military Academy as the second batch of the academy.

During his 2nd year at Military academy he was selected to further his education at United States Military Academy, USA in From 1958 to 1962. He also finished Non-commissioned officer, ranger and airborne training at Fort Benning, Georgia

== Military career ==
Upon completing his education, he returned to Thailand and initially served as an airborne operations instructor at the Infantry Training Center in Lopburi. During his tenure, he earned a reputation for his remarkable enthusiasm, encouraging trainees under his tutelage to shout like tigers during attacks, hence earning him the enduring nickname "Big Tiger" throughout and beyond his entire career. He was later promoted to chief operations and training staff officer of 1st airborne battalion (Now 31st Infantry Regiment) which is the first airborne unit from Lopburi province.

From 1965 to 1966, he was selected to undergo training as the Chief of the Army General Staff. Upon completion, he returned to Lopburi and assumed the position of Chief of Staff at the Royal Thai Army Special Warfare Command. During the Vietnam War, Phichit, along with other notable officers such as Chavalit Yongchaiyudh, served as a prominent commander of the Royal Thai Volunteer Regiment He would also fought in Laotian Civil War and oversee an operations combating the Communist insurgency. later he would be appointed as a deputy of Thai Directorate of Operations

During a coup attempt on 9 September 1985, Phichit organize a plane ride for Major general Manoonkrit Roopkachorn, leader of the coup to leave Thailand after a negotiation.

Phichit retired from the military in 1993 and he would be appointed and serve as a Privy Councillor duty until 2016.

== Honors and decorations ==
- Thailand :
  - 1998 – Knight Grand Cross of the Order of Chula Chom Klao
  - 1988 – Knight Grand Cordon of the Order of the White Elephant
  - 1985 – Knight Grand Cordon of the Order of the Crown of Thailand
  - 1977 – Companion of the Order of Rama
  - 1991 – King Rama IX Royal Cypher Medal
  - 1967 – Victory Medal - Vietnam War, with flames
  - 1985 – Freemen Safeguarding Medal, 1st Class
  - 1969 – Border Service Medal
  - 1973 – Chakra Mala Medal
  - 1987 – Boy Scout Citation Medal of Vajira, First Class
  - 1950 – King Rama IX Coronation Medal
- United States :
  - 1968 – Bronze Star Medal w/ Combat "V"
  - 1968 – National Defense Service Medal
- South Vietnam :
  - 1968 – Gallantry Cross with palm
  - 1968 – Vietnam Campaign Medal
- South Korea:
  - 1986 – Gukseon Medal (2nd Grade) Order of National Security Merit

=== Unit Citation ===
- 1969 – Army Meritorious Unit Commendation
