= 1985 Thai coup attempt =

1985 coup attempt in Thailand

1985 coup attempt in Thailand
Date	9 September 1985; 41 years ago
Location	Royal Plaza, Bangkok, Thailand
Result	Failed military takeover

Belligerents
(Thailand) 4th Tank battalion, 1st Division, King's Guard (Thailand) RTAF Security Force Command (rebels)	Prem Cabinet (Thailand) Government Army Troops: 1st Infantry Battalion, 2nd Infantry Regiment, 2nd Infantry Division

Commanders and leaders
Serm Na Nakhorn; Kriangsak Chamanan (Thailand) Manoonkrit Roopkachorn (Thailand) Manus Roopkachorn	Prem Tinsulanonda (Thailand) Thienchai Sirisamphan

Strength
500	

Casualties and losses
~29 soldiers	
- 1 Civilian, 2 Australian and American Reporters.

The 1985 Thai military coup attempt (known in Thailand as the Retired Officer rebellion, 9 September rebellion and the Two siblings rebellion) was a military coup attempt against the government of Prem Tinsulanonda, by former Thai military leaders on 9 September 1985, but a counter-coup by Prem government in the morning led to surrender of the coup forces.

== Background ==
On 1 April 1981, military leaders of Class 7 led by San Jitpathima, deputy commander-in-chief of the army, staged a coup and calling themself 'Revolutional Council', to consolidate power the government of Prem Tinsulanonda. Prem went to army base outside of Bangkok with Thai Royal Family, included King Bhumibol Adulyadej and setup counter-coup with an assistance from Arthit Kamlang-ek. The influence of Royal Family helped Prem to get support from the second, third and forth regional armies, the Royal Thai Navy, and the Royal Thai Air Force. The 21st Infantry Regiment, the Queen guards, secretly entered Bangkok on 3 April and arrested coup attempt leaders.

The attempt of Arthit made him a prominent player in Thai politics. In 1982, Arthit became commander-in-chief of the army, and in 1983, chief of Royal Thai Armed Forces, highest position in Thai military, as Arthit had supported Prem since 1970s. Arthit led military Class 5 replaced Class 7 as the most powerful supporter of Prem, however discord between Arthit and Prem started in 1983. Thai military factions were in disharmony involving Chavalit Yongchaiyudh of Class 1 and Pichit Kullawanit of Class 2. On 19 March 1983, amid coup rumor, The army forced Prem to dissolve the parliament.

== Prelude ==
Prem was reinstated as premier on 18 April 1983, after Kukrit Pramoj of Social Action Party won the 1983 Thai general election. Prem was still backed by Arthit--who also backed by Royal Elephant group, included Chavalit, Pichit, and Phiraphon Sanphakphisut of Class 1, Class 2, and Class 17. Class 5 leaders got a promotion in order to nullify Class 7 leaders that acted on the 1981 Thai military rebellion.

This action heightened an internal friction and worsened the relationship between Arthit and Prem. There had been a race to get the promotion to the chief of forces as Arthit successor. The candidates were Chavalit and Pichit. Under Chavalit lead of Communist insurgency war, the Royal Thai Police arrested former 22 Communist Party members in July 1984, and Sulak Sivaraksa on lèse-majesté charge. Chavalit was blamed for the arrest, not following the communist amnesty law, the Order 66/2523. These movements were intended to discredit Chavalit by Pichit and Phiraphon side.

On 3 September 1984, King Bhumibol Adulyadej removed his sanctioned on a military promotion, in which Pichit lost the commander position of 1st Division army, Sunthorn Kongsompong of Class 1 was promoted to commander of Royal Thai Army Special Warfare Command to hold the balance of power against Pichit, and Class 5 group who close to Chavalit, such as Suchinda Kraprayoon was promoted to 1st Division army instead to check against Pichit.

On 15 September 1984, the police arrested Manoonkrit Roopkachorn, coup attempted leader, and Bunluesak Phojaroen of Class 7 on charges of attempted assassination of Queen Sirikit, Prem, and Arthit in 1982. Later with the assist from Phichit and Phiraphon, they were released with the help from Queen Sirikit and Crown Prince Vajiralongkorn. Prajak Sawangjit of Class 7 condemned the conflict between Prem-Chavalit and Arthit-Pichit, claimed the arrest were staged by Class 5 against Class 7.

On 6 November 1984, Arthit made a televised condemnation of Prem government's currency devaluation policy. Arthit's faction planned a coup which was suppressed by Prem. Before that, Prem showed he got a support from the palace, by spending ten days with Thai Royal Family, included King Bhumibol Adulyadej in a palace in Sakon Nakhon province from 16 to 25 November. Prem announced on 15 April 1985 that Arthit would be extended his position to 1986.

== Coup ==
On 9 September 1985, Class 7 leaders led by Manoonkrit Roopkachorn (Manoon Roopkachorn at that time) and his younger brother Manus Roopkachorn staged a coup and calling themself 'Revolutionary Council'. Manoonkrit and Manus led 500 of 4th cavalry battalion and the ground forces of the air force to hold strategic locations. They captured chief of the Royal Thai Air Force at his home and took custody of three deputies of the Royal Thai Armed Forces, who had come early into the headquarters.

Serm Na Nakhorn, a former supreme commander of the Royal Thai Armed Forces and a former army chief, headed the Revolutionary Council broadcast on TV which announced that they had seized the government. Later Kriangsak Chamanan, a former prime minister, and Yot Thephatsadin, a former deputy army chief, joined the group. The reasons of the coup were the weak leadership of Prem and the failure of his economic policy.

The government prepared an anti-coup at 6:00 am, even though King Bhumibol Adulyadej was at a palace in southern Thailand, Prem was in Indonesia, and Arthit was in Sweden. Thienchai Sirisamphan, a deputy army chief, led the government side; he urged the coup forces to surrender, using the same radio station that had been left unoccupied by the coup forces. Leaders of the coup eventually surrendered after negotiating to allow Manoonkrit and Manus to flee the country.

Approximately 29 soldiers were killed during the coup, with 1 civilian and two reporters also killed, including Australian cameraman Neil Davis who had survived being wounded numerous times during the Vietnam War.

== See also ==
- 1981 Thai military rebellion
- 1991 Thai coup d'état
