= Progress Party (Thailand, 1983) =

Defunct political party in Thailand

Progress Party พรรคก้าวหน้า
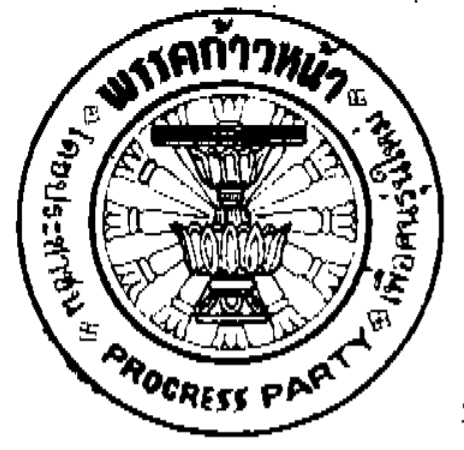
- Leader: Uthai Pimjachon
- Founded: 10 December 1980 (launched); 22 March 1983 (registered)
- Dissolved: 14 April 1989
- Split from: Democrats
- Merged into: Solidarity Party
- Headquarters: Bangkok, Thailand

The Progress Party (Thai: พรรคก้าวหน้า; RTGS: Phak Kao Na) was a political party active in Thailand between 1983 and 1989.

== History ==
The Progress Party was founded on 10 December 1980 and registered on 22 March 1983 by Uthai Pimjaichon who had been speaker of the House of Representatives from April to October 1976 and later broken away from the Democrat Party.

In the 1983 general election the Progress Party won three seats. In the 1986 general election the Progress Party won seven seats and in the 1988 general election the Progress Party won eight seats. Most of the party's seats represented constituencies in Eastern Thailand, more particularly Chachoengsao and Chonburi provinces. In 1989 Progress Party merged into the Solidarity Party.

== General election results ==
Election	Leader	Votes	%	Seats	+/–
1983	Uthai Pimjaichon	338,140	1.3%	3 / 324	–
1986	Uthai Pimjaichon	1,998,721	5.3%	7 / 347	▲4
1988	Uthai Pimjaichon	1,114,468	2.8%	8 / 357	▲1

== Progress Party Speaker ==
Name	Portrait	Periods in Office	Election
Uthai Pimjaichon		27 April 1983 – 1 May 1986	1983 (14th)

== See also ==
- List of political parties in Thailand
