= Panieng Karntarat =

Thai politician and air force officer

- พะเนียง กานตรัตน์
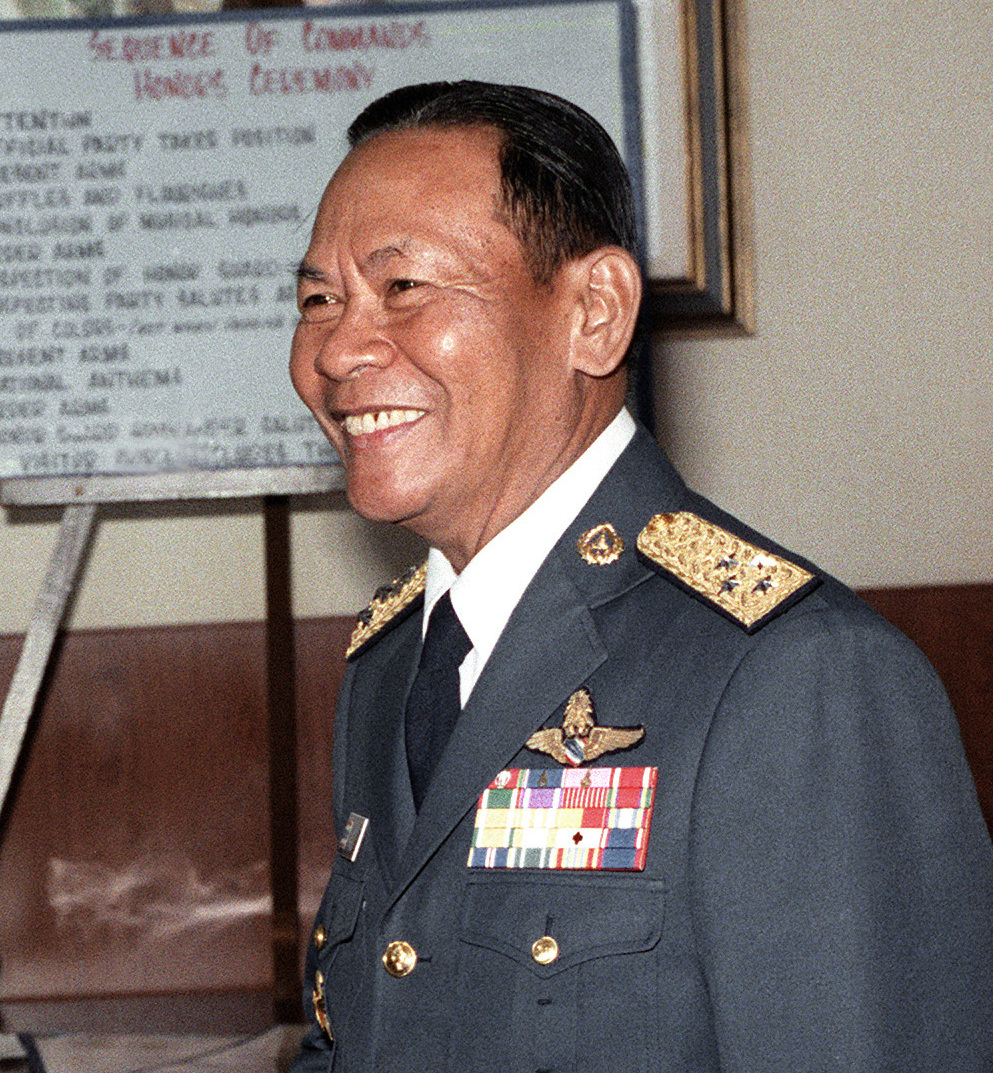
- Panieng Karntarat in 1980

Minister of Defence
- In office 11 August 1986 – 3 August 1988
- Prime Minister: Prem Tinsulanonda
- Preceded by: Prem Tinsulanonda
- Succeeded by: Chatichai Choonhavan

Commander in Chief of the Royal Thai Air Force
- In office 1 October 1977 – 30 September 1981
- Preceded by: Kamon Dechatungkha
- Succeeded by: Thaklaeo Susillavorn

Personal details
- Born: 1 April 1921 Bangkok, Thailand
- Died: 7 July 2010 (aged 89) Bangkok, Thailand
- Spouse: Suranuch Karntarat

Military service
- Allegiance: Thailand
- Branch/service: Royal Thai Air Force
- Years of service: 1941–1981
- Rank: Air chief marshal

Panieng Karntarat (Thai: พะเนียง กานตรัตน์; 1 April 1921 – 7 July 2010) was a Thai politician and retired air force officer. He held the position of Commander-in-Chief of the Royal Thai Air Force from 1977 until his retirement on 30 September 1981 during the Cold War period.

== Education ==
Panieng graduated from secondary education at Debsirin School, Flying Training School Royal Thai Air Force, Royal Air Force College Cranwell and Air Command and Staff College and Tactical Air Command, USA. In Thailand with Air Command and Staff Command, Royal Thai Army War College, National Defence College of Thailand in 1964.

== Career ==
He received the first Royal Thai Air Force service in the year 1941, during the Pacific War in the rank of a pilot officer. After that, he grew up in air force, has held important positions such as the Director of Operations Directorate of Operations, Chief of the Air Staff, and the Commander-in-Chief Royal Thai Air Force on 1 October 1977.

In addition, he was also a member of the National Legislative Assembly, Supreme Military Court Judiciary, Deputy Minister of Defense and Minister of Defense during the government of Prem Tinsulanonda as Prime Minister.

== Honours ==
- Knight Grand Cordon of the Most Exalted Order of the White Elephant
- Knight Grand Cordon of the Most Noble Order of the Crown of Thailand
- Knight Grand Commander of the Most Illustrious Order of Chula Chom Klao (1977)
- Victory Medal - Franco-Thai War
- Victory Medal - Pacific War
- Freeman Safeguarding Medal - 1st Class (1972)
- Border Service Medal
- Chakra Mala Medal
- King Rama IX Royal Cypher Medal, Third Class
- King Rama IX Coronation Medal
- 25th Buddhist Century Celebration Medal
- Red Cross Medal of Appreciation, 1st Class

=== Foreign honours ===
- UK :
  - Commander of the Royal Victorian Order (1961)
- Malaysia :
  - Commander of the Order of Loyalty to the Crown of Malaysia (1979)
- South Korea :
  - Order of Diplomatic Service Merit, First Class (1981)
- South Vietnam :
  - Air Force Distinguished Service Order, First Class
  - Armed Forces Honor Medal, First Class
- USA :
  - Commander of the Legion of Merit

== Died ==
Panieng Karntarat died on 7 July 2010 with a disease at Bhumibol Adulyadej Hospital aged 89.
