= Sanya Dharmasakti =

Prime Minister of Thailand from 1973 to 1975

Sanya Dharmasakti NR PCh MPCh MVM
- สัญญา ธรรมศักดิ์
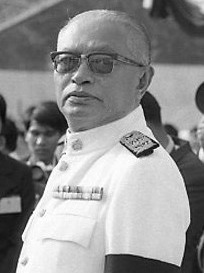
- Dharmasakti in 1974

President of the Privy Council
- In office 5 December 1975 – 4 September 1998
- Monarch: Bhumibol Adulyadej
- Preceded by: Dej Snidvongs
- Succeeded by: Prem Tinsulanonda

12th Prime Minister of Thailand
- In office 14 October 1973 – 15 February 1975
- Monarch: Bhumibol Adulyadej
- Preceded by: Thanom Kittikachorn
- Succeeded by: Seni Pramoj

Rector of Thammasat University
- In office 1 April 1971 – 16 October 1973
- Preceded by: Prince Wan Waithayakon
- Succeeded by: Adul Wichiencharoen (acting)

President of the Supreme Court
- In office 1 October 1963 – 1 October 1967
- Monarch: Bhumibol Adulyadej
- Preceded by: Prawat Pattabongse
- Succeeded by: Prakob Hutasingh

Personal details
- Born: Sanya (Note: At that time, Thais did not have surnames.); 5 April 1907 Thonburi, Krung Thep, Siam (now Bangkok Yai, Bangkok, Thailand)
- Died: 6 January 2002 (aged 94) Ramathibodi Hospital, Ratchathewi, Bangkok, Thailand
- Spouse: Pa-nga Dharmasakti
- Education: Thammasat University; Middle Temple
- Profession: Lawyer

Sanya Dharmasakti (Thai: สัญญา ธรรมศักดิ์, RTGS: Sanya Thammasak, pronounced [sǎn.jāː tʰām.mā.sàk]; 5 April 1907 – 6 January 2002) was a Thai jurist, university professor and politician. He served as the 12th Prime Minister of Thailand from 1973 to 1975.

Sanya Dharmasakti was one of the most influential figures in the politics of Thailand. He served as the president of the Supreme Court (1968–1973) and was dean of the faculty of law and chancellor of Thammasat University during the democracy movement of October 1973. When the "three tyrants" fled, leaving the country leaderless, Sanya was appointed prime minister by royal command (establishing a precedent exercised only three times since for appointment of prime ministers.) Sanya served a second consecutive term by a House resolution for a combined total of 1 year, 124 days, during which he ordered the withdrawal of US forces in what was called Operation Palace Lightning. Sanya appointed a drafting committee for the 1974 constitution, served as vice-president of the constitutional congress, and was requested by the monarch to serve as the president of the privy council.

== Family background ==
Dharmasakti was born on Friday, 5 April 1907 in Thonburi Province, in central Thailand. His father was the high ranking Buddhist scholar, Mahamtree, and abbot, Dhammasarnvetvisetpakdee Srisattayawatta Phiriyapaha or Thongdee Dharmasakti. His mother was Shuen Dharmmasarnvet. Sanya married Pa-nga Dharmasakti, also known as Phenchart, who died in 2001. They had two sons, named Chartsak and Jakatham.

== Education ==
Dharmasakti went to Assumption College in 1914 and finished high school, majoring in English in 1925. He went to the law school of the Ministry of Justice for three years, graduating in 1928. He got the highest score and received the Rapheeboonnithi scholarship. This scholarship allowed him to study law in England at the Middle Temple for three years. He was called to the English Bar in 1932.

== Prime Minister of Thailand (1973–1975) ==
=== Foreign policy ===
Palace Lightning was the name given to the plan by which the USAF withdrew its aircraft and personnel from Thailand. After the fall of the US-supported governments in both Phnom Penh and Saigon in the spring of 1975, the political climate between Washington and the government of Judge Sanya soured, and US military forces were ordered to withdraw by the end of the year. Strategic Air Command units left in December 1975; U-Tapao Royal Thai Navy Airfield, however, remained under US control until formally handed back to the Thai government on 13 June 1976.

== Death ==
Sanya Dharmasakti died at Ramathibodi Hospital, Bangkok on 6 January 2002.

== Royal decorations ==
Sanya received the following royal decorations in the Honours System of Thailand:

- 1996 – Knight of The Ancient and Auspicious Order of the Nine Gems
- 1968 – Knight Grand Cross of The Most Illustrious Order of Chula Chom Klao
- 1961 – Knight Grand Cordon of the Most Exalted Order of the White Elephant
- 1959 – Knight Grand Cordon of The Most Noble Order of the Crown of Thailand
- 1974 – Freeman Safeguarding Medal, 1st Class
- 1969 – Dushdi Mala Pin of Arts and Science (Civilian)
- 1950 – Chakrabarti Mala Medal
- 1971 – King Rama IX Royal Cypher Medal, 1st Class

=== Foreign Honours ===
- Japan :
  - Grand Cordon of the Order of the Rising Sun
- Germany :
  - Grand Cross 1st Class of the Order of Merit of the Federal Republic of Germany
- Kingdom of Laos :
  - Grand Cross of the Order of the Million Elephants and the White Parasol
- Philippines :
  - Grand Collar of the Order of Sikatuna
- Peru :
  - Grand Cross of the Order of the Sun of Peru

=== Academic rank ===
- Professor of Thammasat University

Political offices
Preceded by Thanom Kittikachorn	Prime Minister of Thailand; 1973–1975	Succeeded by Seni Pramoj
Preceded by Dej Snidvongs	President of the Privy Council of Thailand; 1975–1998	Succeeded by Prem Tinsulanonda
