= 1988 Thai general election =

- 24 July 1988

All 357 seats in the House of Representatives 179 seats needed for a majority
- Registered: 26,658,638
- Turnout: 63.56% (▲2.13pp)
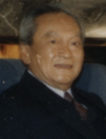

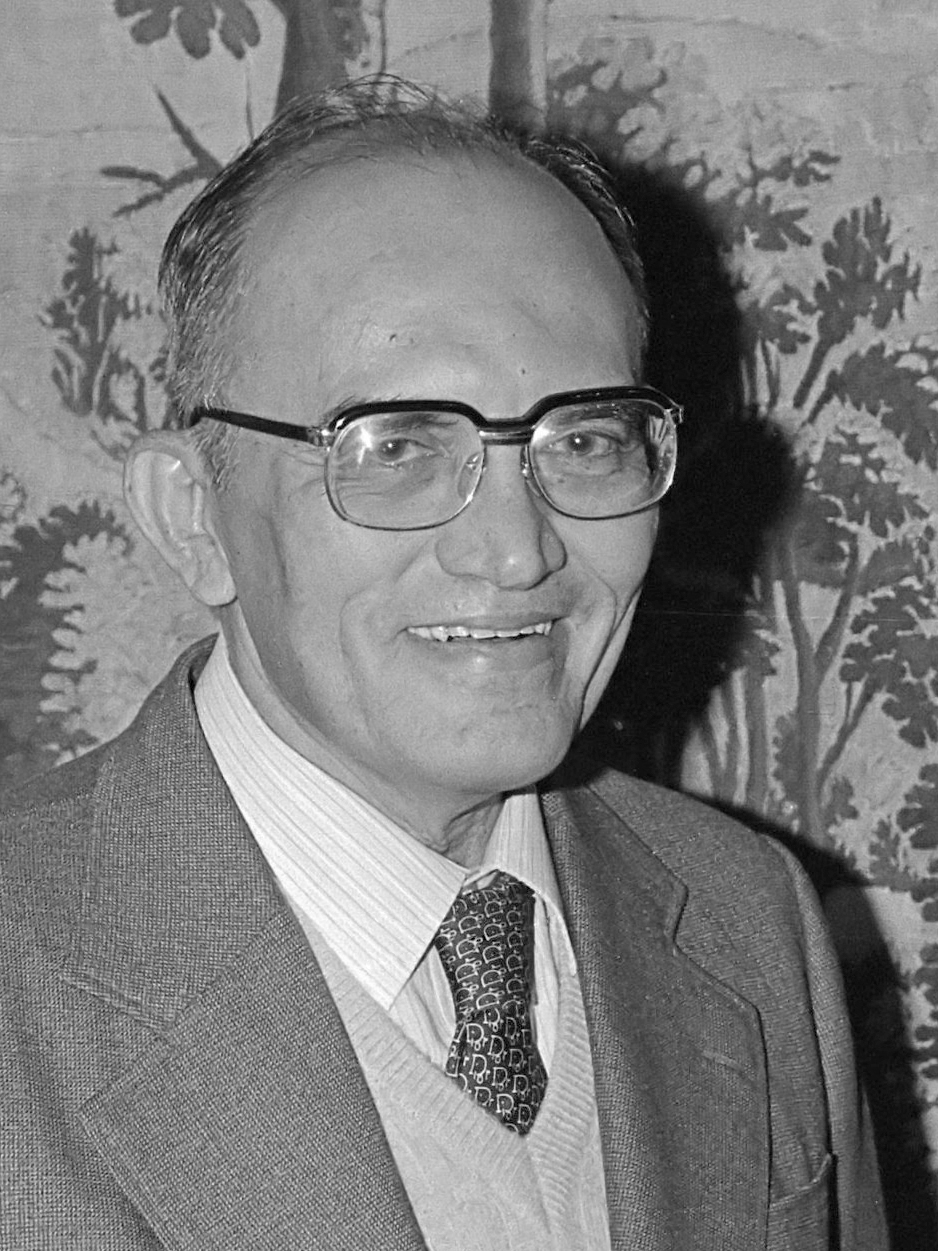

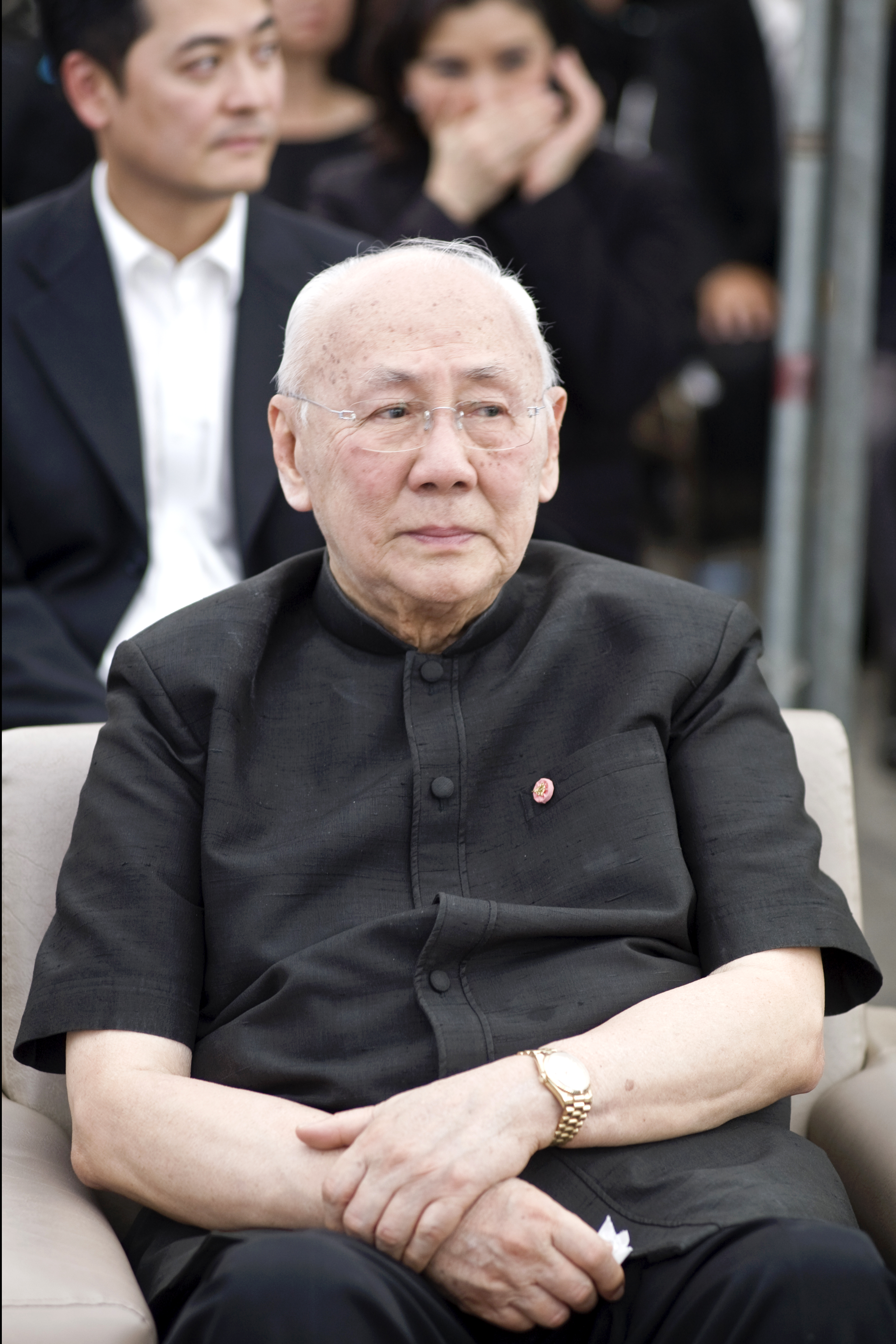

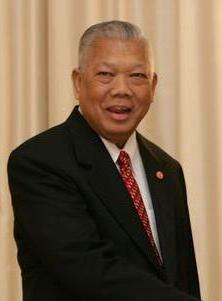

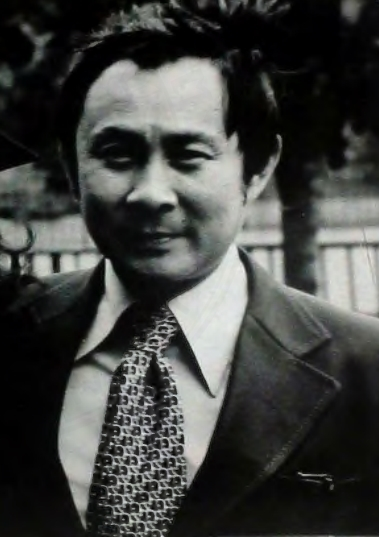

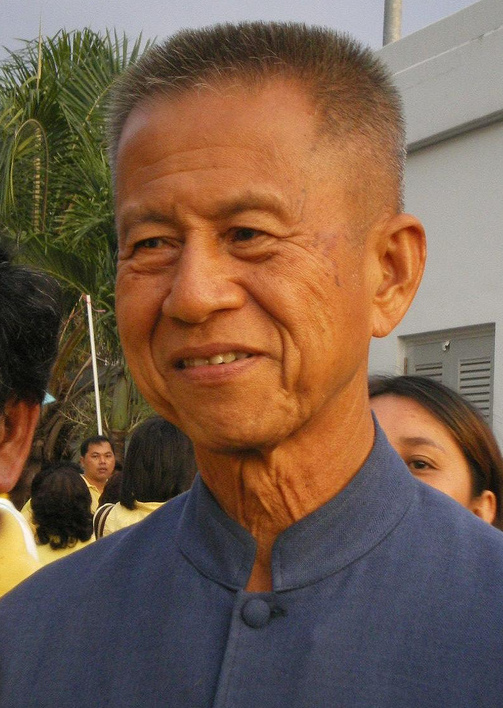
	First party	Second party	Third party
Leader	Chatichai Choonhavan	Siddhi Savetsila	Bhichai Rattakul
Party	Chart Thai	Social Action	Democrat
Last election	17.26%, 63 seats	12.12%, 51 seats	22.52%, 100 seats
Seats won	87	54	48
Seat change	▲24	▲3	▼52
Popular vote	7,612,148	4,651,161	4,456,077
Percentage	19.29%	11.79%	11.29%
Swing	▲2.03pp	▼0.33pp	▼11.23pp
	Fourth party	Fifth party	Sixth party
	RTP
Leader	Narong Wongwan	Samak Sundaravej	Tianchai Sirisampan
Party	Ruam Thai	Thai Citizen	People
Last election	4.41%, 19 seats	6.94%, 24 seats	7.40%, 18 seats
Seats won	34	31	21
Seat change	▲15	▲7	▲3
Popular vote	3,988,941	2,413,520	2,336,962
Percentage	10.11%	6.12%	5.92%
Swing	▲5.70pp	▼0.82pp	▼1.48pp
	Seventh party	Eighth party	Ninth party
Leader	Chalermphan Srivikorn	Arthit Kamlang-ek	Chamlong Srimuang
Party	People's	Thai People	Palang Dharma
Last election	0.23%, 0 seats	0.52%, 1 seats	–
Seats won	19	17	14
Seat change	▲19	▲16	New
Popular vote	2.454.870	3,143,851	3,586,878
Percentage	6.22%	7.97%	9.09%
Swing	▲5.99pp	▲7.45pp	New
Prime Minister before election
Prem Tinsulanonda
Independent
Elected Prime Minister
Chatichai Choonhavan
Chart Thai

General elections were held in Thailand on 24 July 1988. The Thai Nation Party emerged as the largest party, winning 87 of the 357 seats. Voter turnout was 64%.

Leaders of the top five elected political parties, consisting of the Thai Nation Party, the Social Action Party, the Democrat Party, the Ruam Thai Party and the Thai Citizen Party, discussed forming a government. All agreed that General Prem Tinsulanonda, the incumbent prime minister, should continue in office, and met with him his residence at Ban Si Sao Thewet on the evening of 27 July. However, Tinsulanonda refused to serve as prime minister for a fourth term, saying eight years and five months as Prime Minister was enough. Chatichai Choonhavan of the Thai Nation Party subsequently became Prime Minister on 4 August, appointing his cabinet on 9 August. Tinsulanonda was appointed as a Privy Councilor on 23 August.

== Results ==
Party	Votes	%	Seats	+/–
Thai Nation Party	7,612,148	19.29	87	+24
Social Action Party	4,651,161	11.79	54	+3
Democrat Party	4,456,077	11.29	48	–52
Ruam Thai Party	3,988,941	10.11	34	+15
Palang Dharma Party	3,586,878	9.09	14	New
Thai People Party	3,143,851	7.97	17	+16
People's	2,454,870	6.22	19	+19
Thai Citizen Party	2,413,520	6.12	31	+7
People Party	2,336,962	5.92	21	+3
Community Action	1,127,418	2.86	9	–6
Progress Party	1,114,468	2.82	8	–1
United Democrat Party	810,547	2.05	6	–32
Liberal Party	690,486	1.75	3	+2
Mass Party	622,933	1.58	5	+2
Social Democratic Force	273,932	0.69	1	New
Thai Agro Industry	179,563	0.46	0	New
Total	39,463,755	100.00	357	+10
Valid votes	16,350,143	96.49		
Invalid/blank votes	594,788	3.51		
Total votes	16,944,931	100.00		
Registered voters/turnout	26,658,638	63.56		
Source: Nohlen et al.
