= 1986 Thai general election =

- 27 July 1986

All 347 seats in the House of Representatives 174 seats needed for a majority
- Registered: 26,160,100
- Turnout: 61.43% (▲10.67pp)
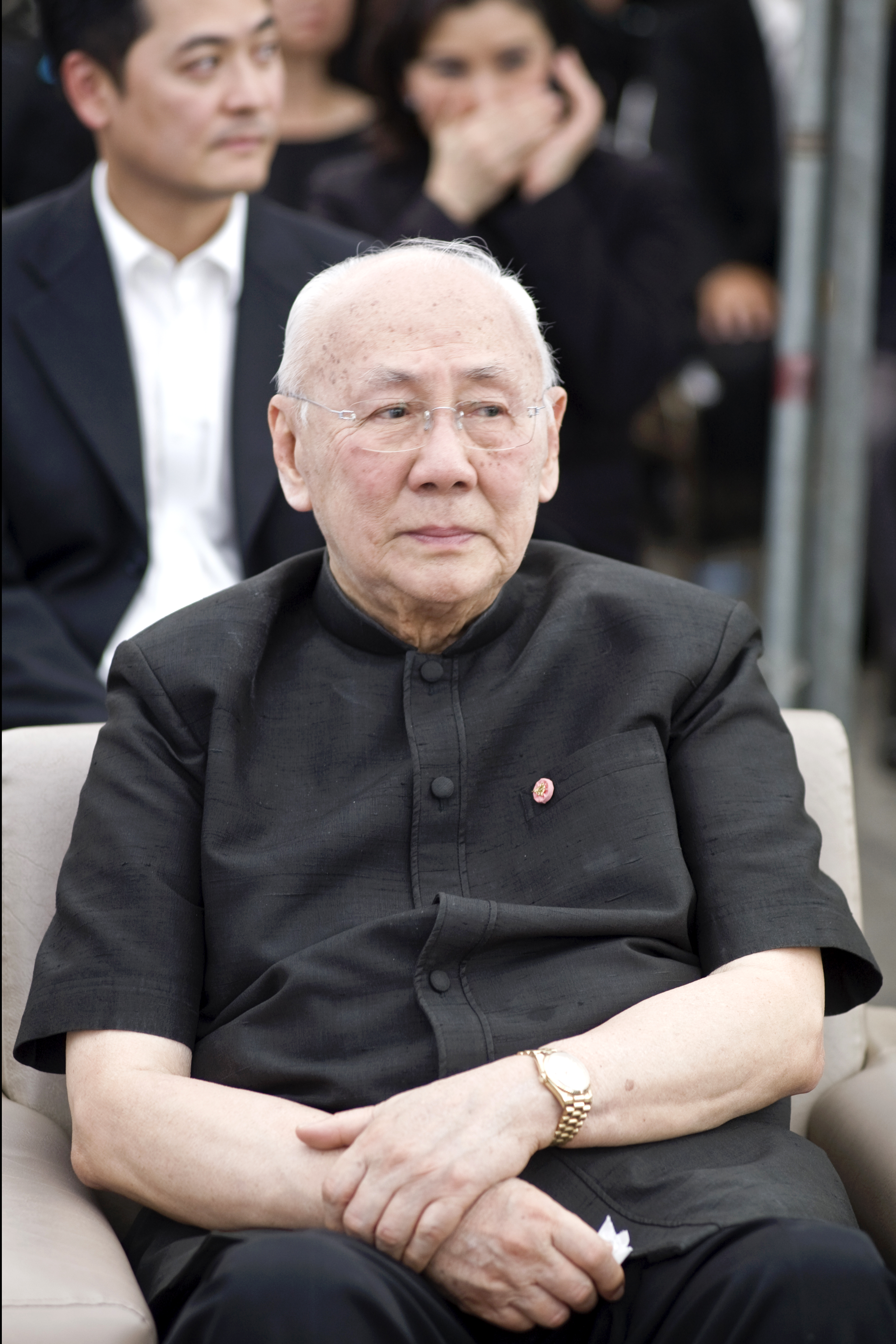

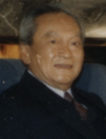

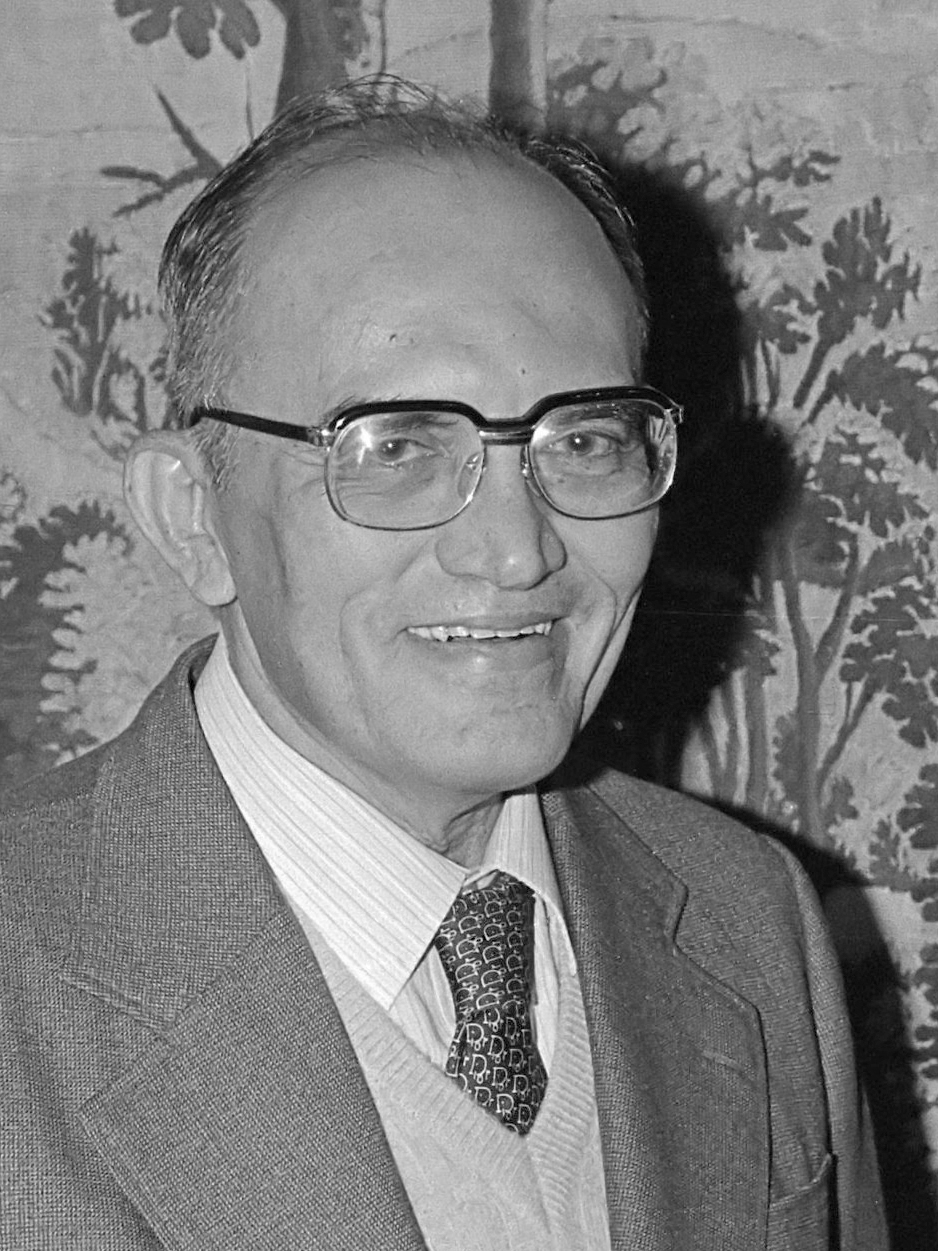

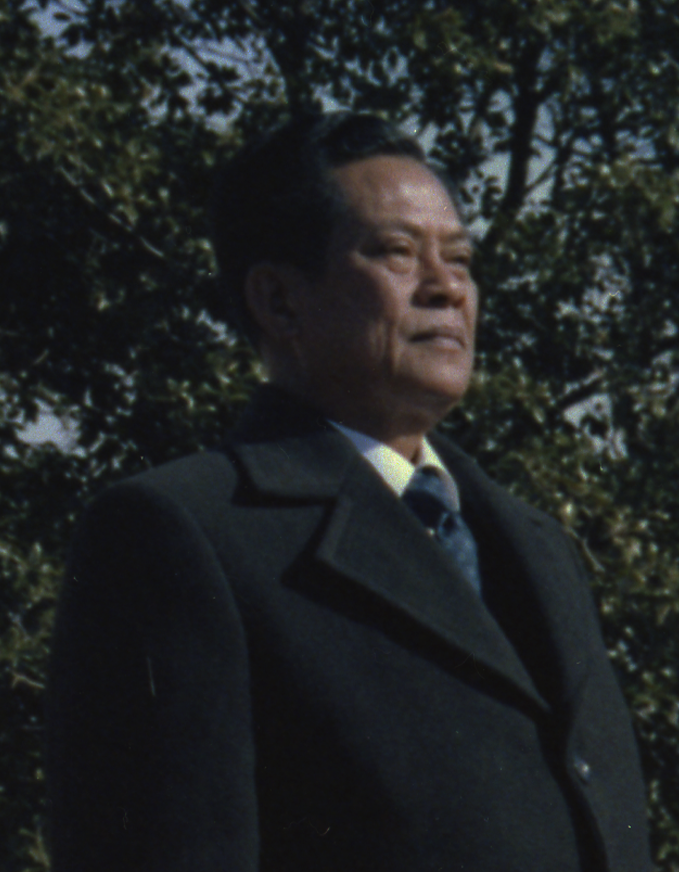

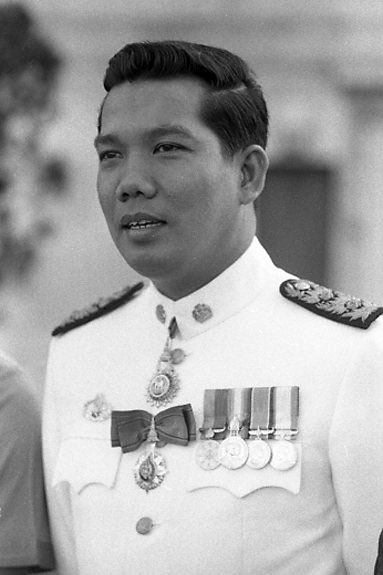

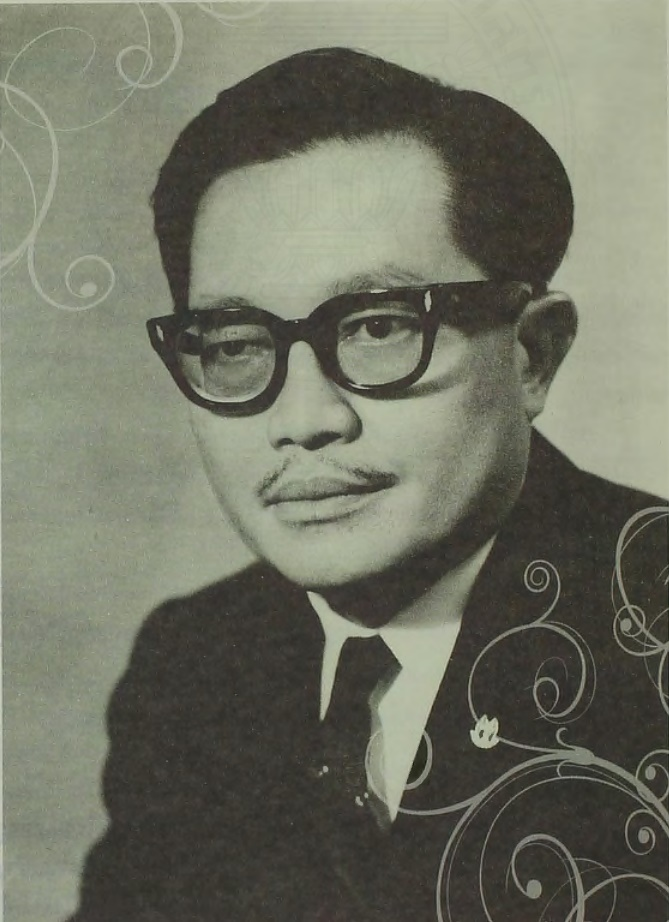

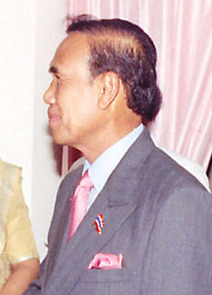
	First party	Second party	Third party
Leader	Bhichai Rattakul	Chatichai Choonhavan	Siddhi Savetsila
Party	Democrat	Chart Thai	Social Action
Last election	15.63%, 56 seats	23.81%, 73 seats	26.78%, 92 seats
Seats won	100	63	51
Seat change	▲44	▼10	▼41
Popular vote	8,477,701	6,495,370	4,560,650
Percentage	22.52%	17.26%	12.12%
Swing	▲6.89pp	▼6.55pp	▼14.66pp
	Fourth party	Fifth party	Sixth party
			RTP
Leader	Kriangsak Chamanan	Samak Sundaravej	Narong Wongwan
Party	National Democrat	Thai Citizen	Ruam Thai
Last election	8.06%, 15 seats	9.03%, 36 seats	–
Seats won	38	24	19
Seat change	▲23	▼12	New
Popular vote	3,814,651	2,395,795	1,658,812
Percentage	10.13%	6.94%	4.41%
Swing	▲2.07pp	▼2.09pp	New
	Seventh party	Eighth party
Leader	Boonchu Rojanastien	Uthai Pimchaichon
Party	Community Action	Progress
Last election	–	1.28%, 3 seats
Seats won	15	9
Seat change	New	▲6
Popular vote	2,268,346	1,998,721
Percentage	6.03%	5.31%
Swing	New	▲4.03pp
Prime Minister before election
Prem Tinsulanonda
Independent
Elected Prime Minister
Prem Tinsulanonda
Independent

General elections were held in Thailand on 27 July 1986. The Democrat Party emerged as the largest party, winning 100 of the 347 seats. Voter turnout was 61%.

== Results ==
Party	Votes	%	Seats	+/–
Democrat Party	8,477,701	22.52	100	+44
Thai Nation Party	6,496,370	17.26	63	–10
Social Action Party	4,560,615	12.12	51	–41
United Democrat Party	3,814,651	10.13	38	New
People Party	2,786,105	7.40	18	New
Thai Citizen Party	2,612,717	6.94	24	–12
Community Action	2,268,346	6.03	15	New
Progress Party	1,998,721	5.31	9	+6
Ruam Thai Party	1,658,812	4.41	19	New
National Democrat Party	1,078,128	2.86	3	–12
Mass Party	723,758	1.92	3	New
Liberal Party	404,960	1.08	1	New
Labour Democrat Party	246,512	0.65	1	+1
New Force Party	232,027	0.62	1	+1
Thai People Party	196,527	0.52	1	–3
Rak Thai	85,241	0.23	0	New
Total	37,641,191	100.00	347	+23
Valid votes	15,506,897	96.49		
Invalid/blank votes	564,060	3.51		
Total votes	16,070,957	100.00		
Registered voters/turnout	26,160,100	61.43		
Source: Nohlen et al.
