= Akeyuth Anchanbutr =

- Born: 24 June 1954; Bangkok, Thailand
- Died: 7 June 2013 (aged 58); Prachuap Khiri Khan, Thailand
- Children: Kongkarun Siprasan
- Parents: Plaek Anchanbutr (father); Nantha Chatrakul na Ayudhaya (mother)

Akeyuth Anchanbutr (Thai: เอกยุทธ อัญชันบุตร; RTGS: Ekkayut Anchanbut; 24 June 1954—7 June 2013) was a Thai pyramid scheme operator and political activist.

Akeyuth was the head of the controversial Charter Investment pyramid scheme, which collapsed in 1983. He fled to England in 1984 to avoid charges. Akeyuth then invested the proceeds of pyramid scheme in a chain of oriental supermarkets and is estimated to have accumulated a personal wealth of billions.

In 2004, after the 20 year statute of limitations was exhausted, he returned to Thailand and launched a campaign against Prime Minister Thaksin Shinawatra. His Thailand Insider website was strongly critical of the Prime Minister, and was temporarily blocked by Thai authorities on June 21, 2005, and again on December 15, 2005. He also attacked the premiership of Thaksin's sister Yingluck Shinawatra, causing a scandal in 2012 when he revealed that she had a private meeting with business executives at the Four Seasons Hotel in Bangkok.

Akeyuth was murdered in June 2013. He was last seen on 6 June, and his body discovered on 11 June. His driver Santiphap Pengduang was arrested and confessed to murdering Akeyuth with financial motives. This was questioned by Akeyuth's former lawyer Suwat Apaipak, who said that Santiphap had later claimed to have been hired. However, Suwat dropped the case in August, claiming to have received death threats. Santiphap and his friend Sutthipoing Pimpisarn were sentenced in December 2014 to death commuted to life imprisonment for their confessions, while two others, who had been involved in concealing the body, received nineteen and eight months. Santiphap's parents were found guilty of keeping and hiding the stolen cash. They appealed, and the case went to the Supreme Court in 2017, which upheld their sixteen-month jail terms.

== See also ==
- 2005–2006 Thai political crisis
