= 1983 Thai general election =

- 18 April 1983

All 324 seats in the House of Representatives 163 seats needed for a majority
- Registered: 24,224,470
- Turnout: 50.76% (▲6.86pp)
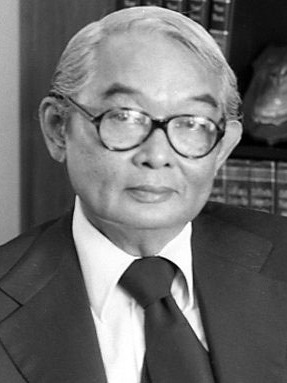

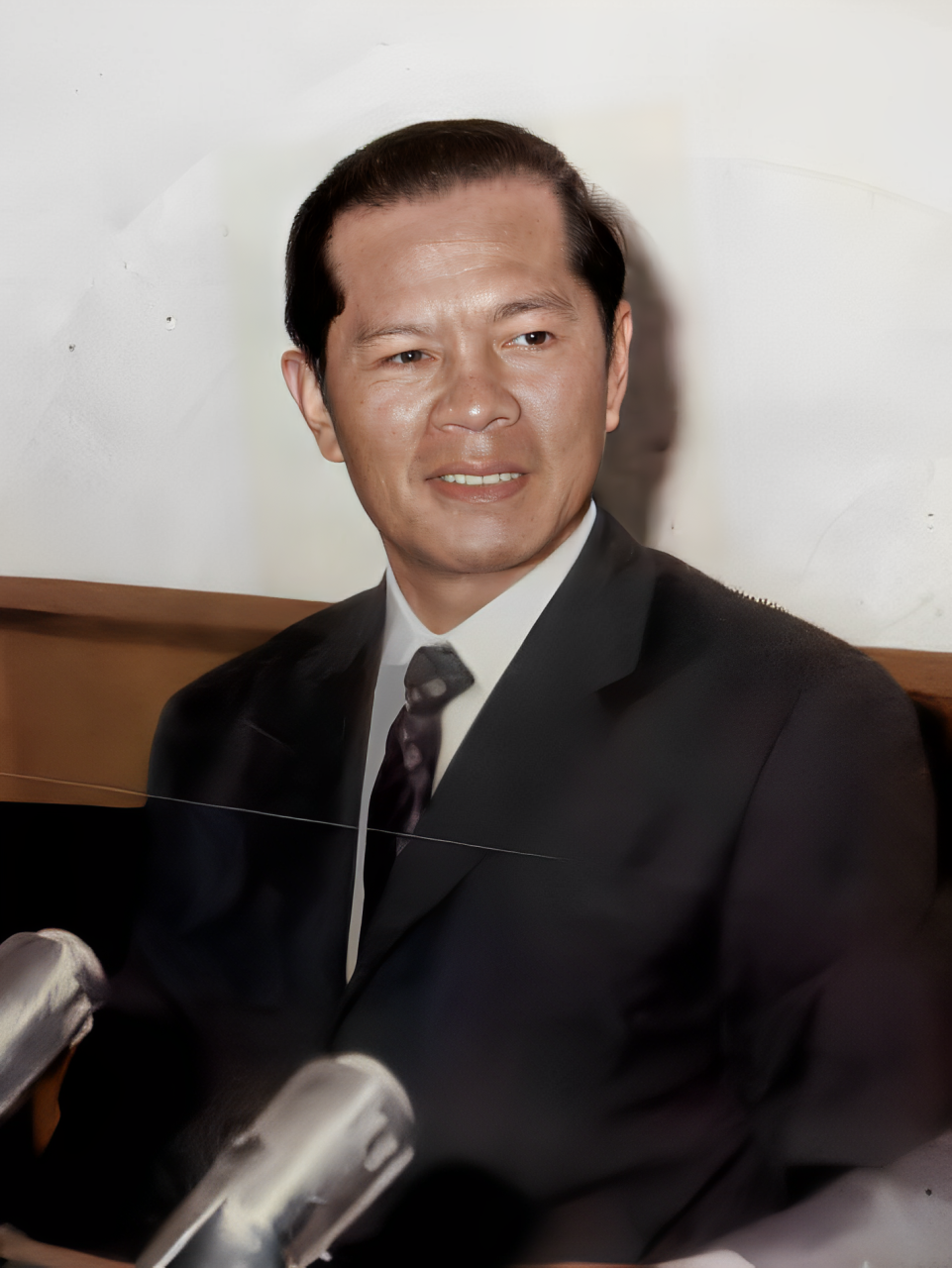

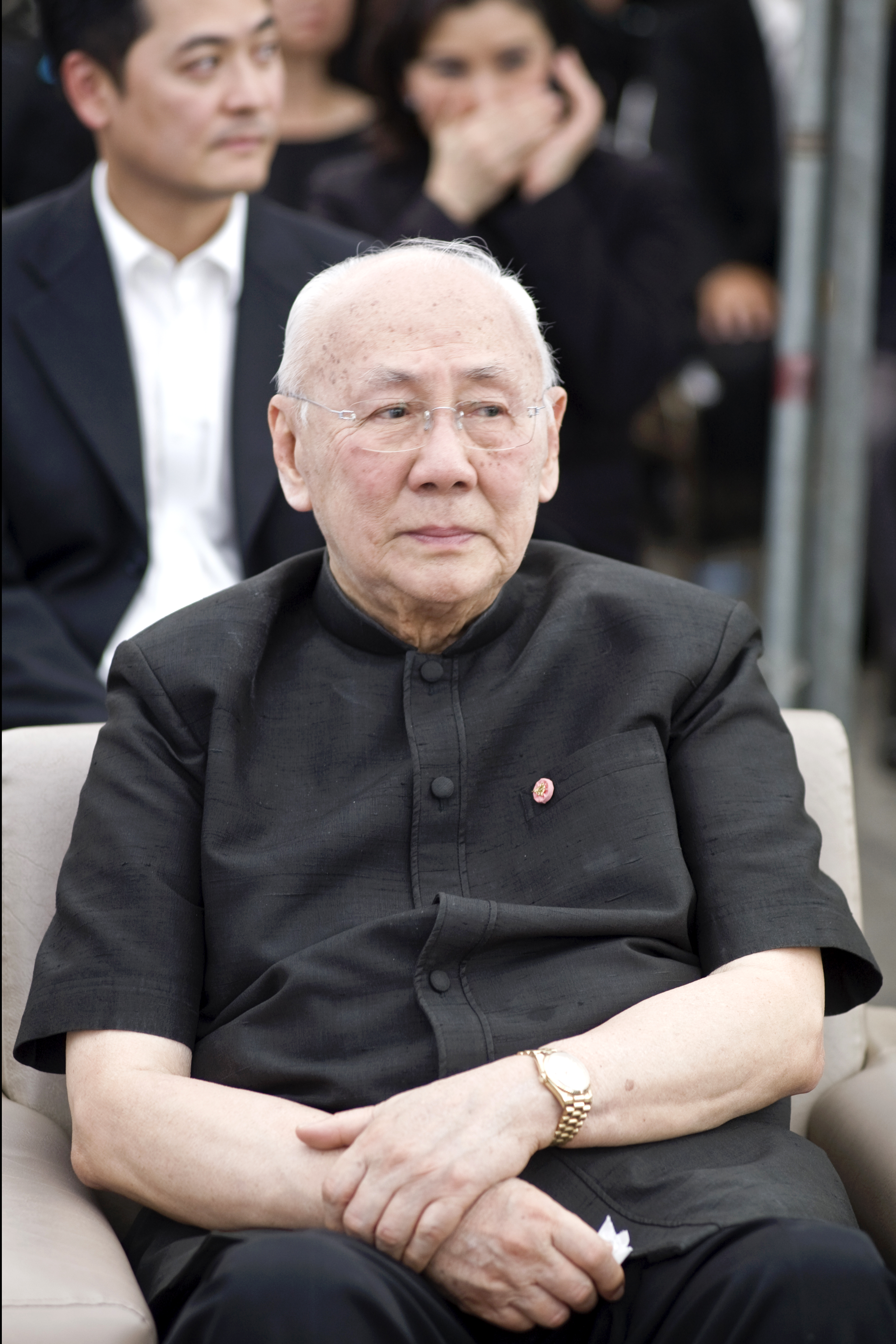

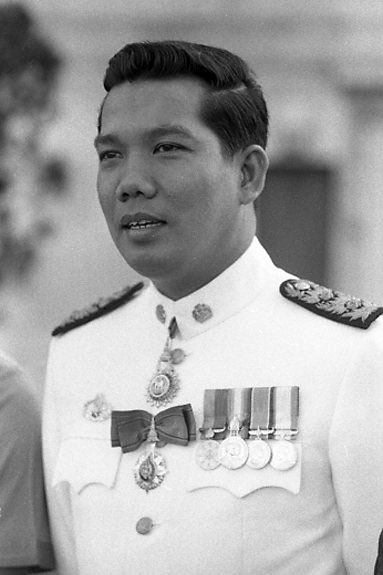

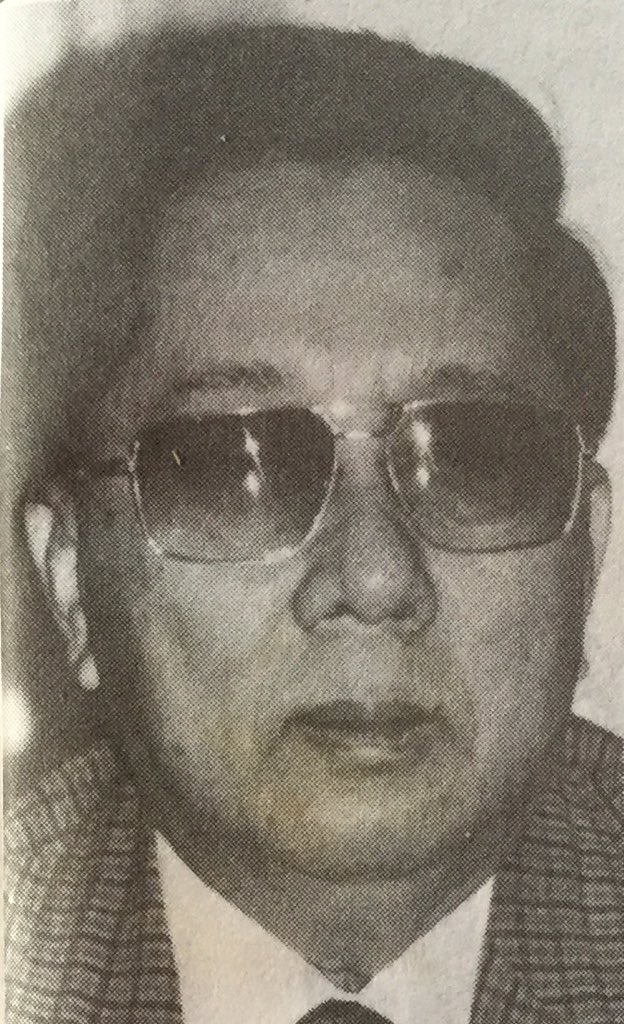

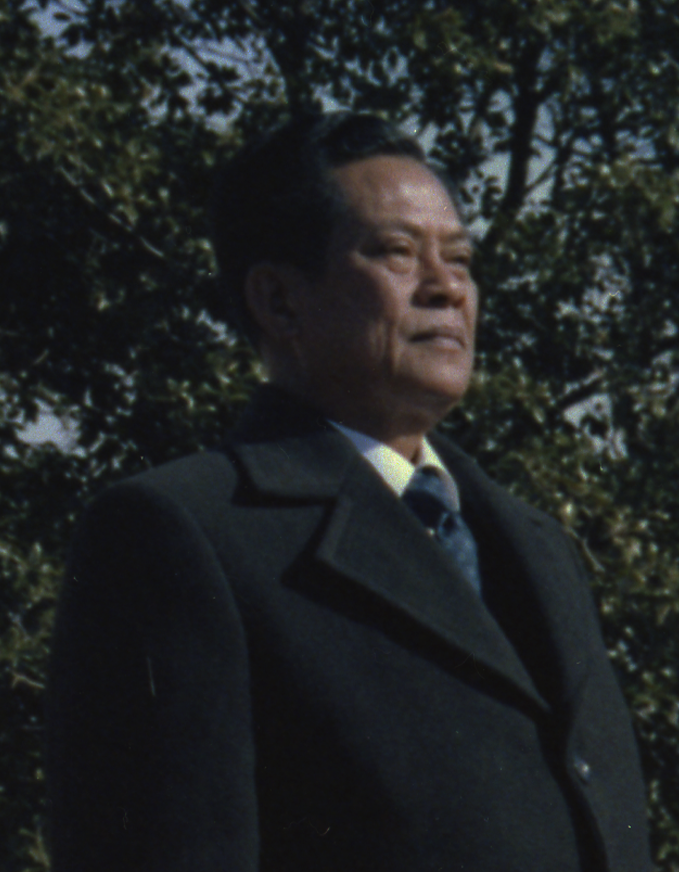
	First party	Second party	Third party
Leader	Kukrit Pramoj	Pramarn Adireksarn	Bhichai Rattakul
Party	Social Action	Chart Thai	Democrat
Last election	21.26%, 82 seats	11.26%, 38 seats	14.57%, 33 seats
Seats won	92	73	56
Seat change	▲10	▲35	23 ▲
Popular vote	7,103,177	6,315,568	4,144,414
Percentage	26.78%	23.81%	15.63%
Swing	▲5.52pp	▲12.55pp	▲1.06pp
	Fourth party	Fifth party	Sixth party
Leader	Samak Sundaravej	Phon Rungprasitwit	Kriangsak Chamanan
Party	Thai Citizen	Siam Democrat	National Democrat
Last election	2.69%, 32 seats	–	–
Seats won	36	18	15
Seat change	▲4	New	New
Popular vote	2,395,795	839,915	2,137,780
Percentage	9.03%	3.17%	8.06%
Swing	▲6.34pp	New	New
Prime Minister before election
Prem Tinsulanonda
Independent
Elected Prime Minister
Prem Tinsulanonda
Independent

General elections were held in Thailand on 18 April 1983. The Social Action Party emerged as the largest party, winning 92 of the 324 seats. Voter turnout was 51%.

== Results ==
Party	Votes	%	Seats	+/–
Social Action Party	7,103,177	26.78	92	+10
Thai Nation Party	6,315,568	23.81	73	+35
Democrat Party	4,144,414	15.63	56	+23
Thai Citizen Party	2,395,795	9.03	36	+4
National Democrat Party	2,137,780	8.06	15	New
Siam Democrat Party	839,915	3.17	18	New
Free People Party	474,402	1.79	1	New
Progress Party	338,140	1.28	3	New
Social Democratic Party	297,332	1.12	2	+2
New Force Party	195,340	0.74	0	–8
Thai People Party	180,364	0.68	4	New
United Nation Party	14,866	0.06	0	New
Labour Democrat Party	1,493	0.01	0	New
Other parties	81,845	0.31	0	–
Independents	2,000,290	7.54	24	–39
Total	26,520,721	100.00	324	+23
Valid votes	11,797,212	95.95		
Invalid/blank votes	498,127	4.05		
Total votes	12,295,339	100.00		
Registered voters/turnout	24,224,470	50.76		
Source: Nohlen et al.
