= Arthit Kamlang-ek =

Thai general (1925–2015)

- อาทิตย์ กำลังเอก

Deputy Prime Minister of Thailand
- In office 17 December 1994 – 12 July 1995
- Prime Minister: Chuan Leekpai
- In office 26 August 1990 – 23 February 1991
- Prime Minister: Chatichai Choonhavan

Supreme Commander of the Armed Forces
- In office 1 October 1983 – 31 August 1986
- Preceded by: Saiyud Kerdphol
- Succeeded by: Supa Gajaseni

Commander-in-chief of the Royal Thai Army
- In office 1 October 1982 – 27 May 1986
- Preceded by: Prayut Jarumanee
- Succeeded by: Chavalit Yongchaiyudh

Personal details
- Born: 31 August 1925 Bangkok, Krung Thep, Siam (now Bangkok, Thailand)
- Died: 19 January 2015 (aged 89) Ratchathewi, Bangkok, Thailand
- Party: National Development Party
- Other political affiliations: Thai People's Party (1988-1992); Justice Unity Party (1992)
- Spouse(s): Prapasri Kamlang-ek (div.); Pornsun Kamlang-ek
- Children: Titiwat Kamlang-ek
- Education: Royal Military Academy
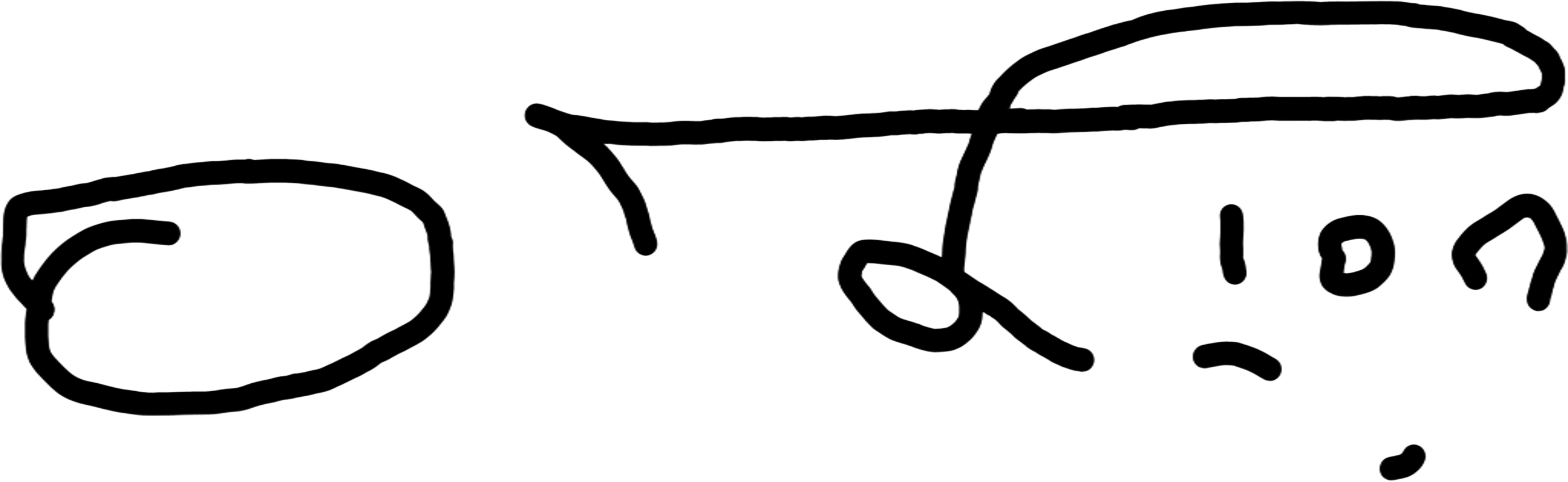
- Signature

Military service
- Allegiance: Thailand
- Branch/service: Royal Thai Army
- Rank: General
- Commands: Commander-in-Chief; Supreme Commander

Arthit Kamlang-ek (31 August 1925 – 19 January 2015; Thai: อาทิตย์ กำลังเอก, Thai pronunciation: [ʔaːtʰít kamlaŋʔèːk]) was a Thai general. He was the Commander-in-Chief of the Royal Thai Army from 1982 to 1986 and in parallel the Supreme Commander of the Royal Thai Armed Forces from 1983 to 1986. He was particularly influential during the 1980s during the government of Prem Tinsulanonda.

== Education and early career ==
Arthit graduated from the Chulachomklao Royal Military Academy. He later attended the Royal Thai Army's Staff College.

== Family ==
General Arthit has two sons, one daughter and one stepson. His youngest son, Titiwat Kamlang-ek, has two children: Peerawut Kamlang-ek and Athittaya Kamlang-ek.

== 1981 Young Turk coup ==
General Arthit was a leader of the counter-coup against the Young Turk coup of 1981. Afterwards, he was promoted to Commander of the First Army Region, traditionally regarded as the most strategic post for coups and counter-coups.

== Clash with Prem ==
General Arthit's subsequent rapid rise to the post of Commander-in-Chief of the Royal Thai Army in October 1982 was unprecedented. Also serving as the Supreme Commander starting September 1983, General Arthit at times challenged the propriety of key government policies. In November 1984, for example, he made a televised condemnation of the government's currency devaluation policy. Also in 1984, apparently with General Arthit's blessing, some active-duty and retired army officers pressed for constitutional amendments aimed at enhancing their political influence. A showdown between Arthit's camp and Prem's ruling coalition was narrowly averted when General Arthit urged the officers to abandon the amendments.

General Arthit also played a role in the 1985 election which brought Chamlong Srimuang to the governorship of Bangkok. Arthit urged his subordinates and their families to vote against any party that had an anti-military orientation, particularly the Democrats.

== Downfall ==
In 1986, General Arthit lobbied vigorously to extend his term as Army Commander another year to September 1987, which would allow him to retain influence after the expiration of Prem's term as prime minister. But on March 24, 1986, the government announced that Arthit would be retired as scheduled on September 1, 1986. Then on 27 May, Prem stunned the nation by dismissing Arthit from his position as Army chief and replacing him with General Chaovalit Yongchaiyut, a Prem loyalist. Prior to that, no Army Chief had ever been fired. This unprecedented action came amid the flurry of rumours that the general was involved in behind-the-scenes manoeuvres to undermine Prem's chances for another premiership after the July 1986 parliamentary elections. General Arthit, whose largely ceremonial post as Supreme Commander of the Royal Thai Armed Forces until September 1986 was not affected by the dismissal order, denied any role in such maneuvers.

== Post-military career ==
In early 1991, Arthit was appointed by Prime Minister Chatichai Choonhavan as Deputy Defense Minister. Early rumors of his appointment seriously angered many military leaders, especially Army chief Suchinda Kraprayoon and his former classmates from the 5th Class of the Chulachomklao Royal Military Academy. A military coup led by Suchinda and the National Peace Keeping Council soon overthrew Chatichai's government.

== Honours ==
- 1982 - Knight Grand Cordon of the Most Exalted Order of the White Elephant
- 1981 - Knight Grand Cordon of the Most Noble Order of the Crown of Thailand
- 1983 - Knight Grand Commander of the Most Illustrious Order of Chula Chom Klao
- 1990 - Knight Commander of the Honourable Order of Rama
- 1995 - Member of the Order of Symbolic Propitiousness Ramkeerati
- 1969 - Victory Medal - Pacific War
- 1952 - Victory Medal - Korean War
- 1973 - Victory Medal - Vietnam War, with flames
- 1982 - Freemen Safeguarding Medal (First Class)
- 1982 - Border Service Medal
- 1959 - Chakra Mala Medal
- 1981 - King Bhumibol Adulyadej's Royal Cypher Medal, 3rd

=== Foreign honours ===
- UN :
  - United Nations Service Medal Korea (1952)
- South Vietnam :
  - Armed Forces Honor Medal, First Class (1968)
  - Vietnam Campaign Medal (1968)
- South Korea :
  - Order of National Security Merit, Tongil Medal (1983)
- USA :
  - Commander of the Legion of Merit (1983)
  - Army Commendation Medal (1969)
- Malaysia :
  - Honorary Commander of the Order of the Defender of the Realm (P.M.N.) (1984)
- Germany :
  - Grand Cross 1st Class of the Order of Merit of the Federal Republic of Germany (1984)
- Austria :
  - Grand Decoration of Honour in Silver of the Decoration of Honour for Services to the Republic of Austria with Star (1984)
- Indonesia :
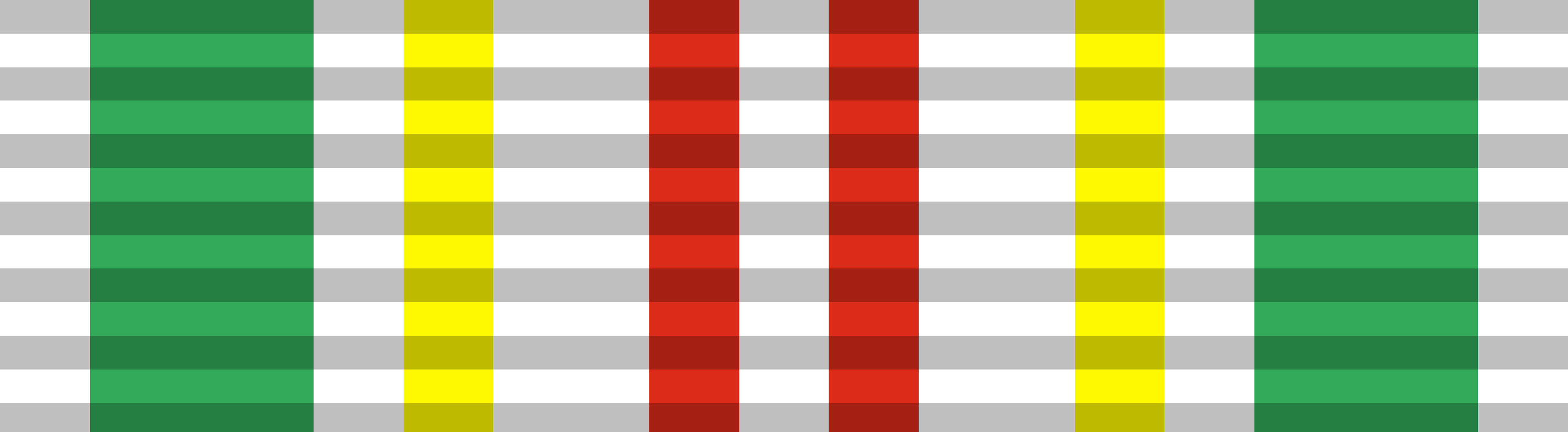
  - Grand Meritorious Military Order Star, First Class (1984)
  - Army Meritorious Service Star, First Class (1984)
- Kingdom of Nepal :
  - Order of Tri Shakti Patta, First Class (1984)
- Taiwan :
  - Grand Cordon of the Order of the Cloud and Banner (1984)
- France :
  - Commander of the Legion of Honour (1984)
