= Prem Tinsulanonda =

Prime Minister of Thailand from 1980 to 1988

Prem Tinsulanonda NR PCh SR MPCh MVM PBh
- เปรม ติณสูลานนท์
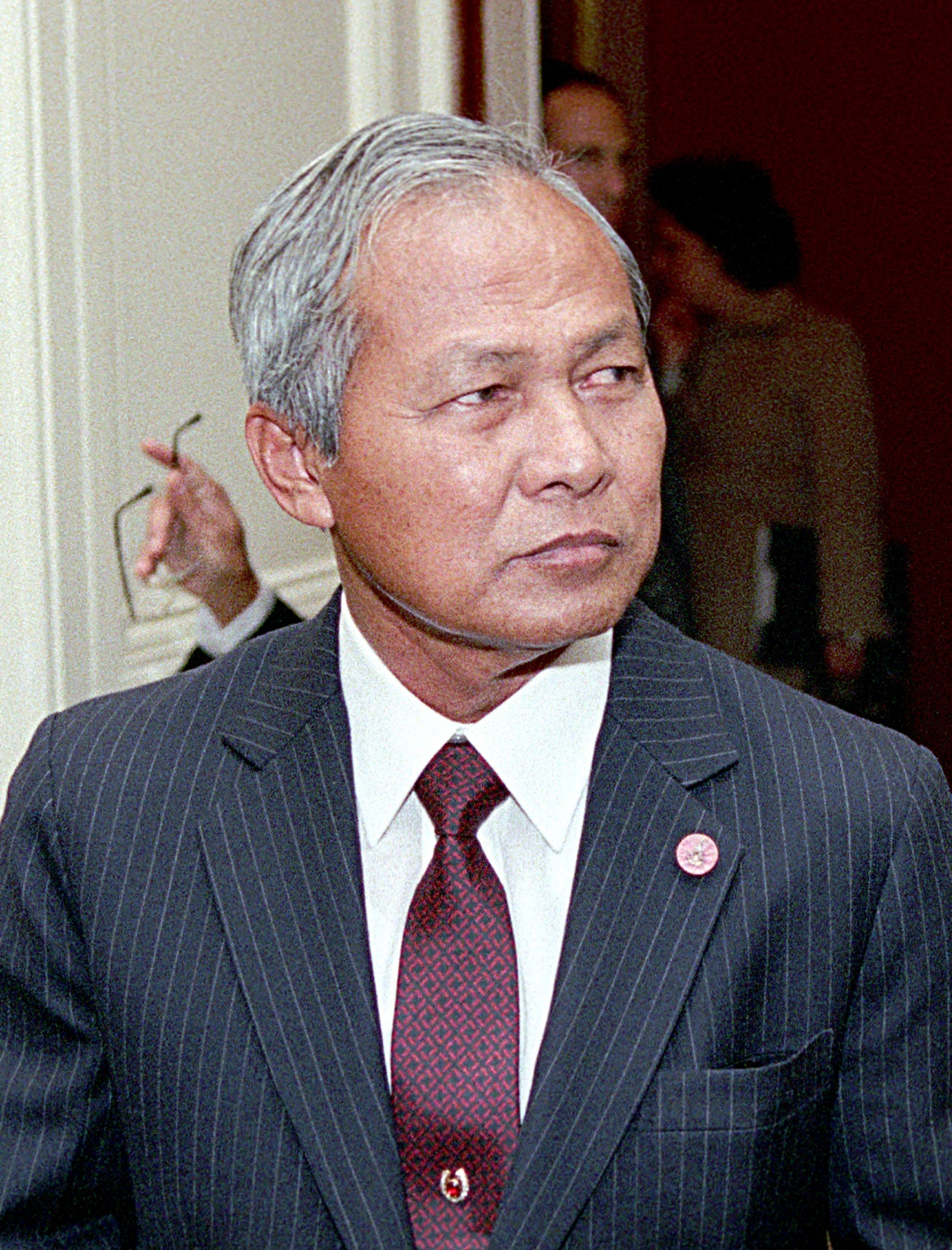
- Prem in 1984

Regent of Thailand
- In office 13 October 2016 – 1 December 2016
- Monarch: Vajiralongkorn
- Prime Minister: Prayut Chan-o-cha
- Preceded by: Srinagarindra (1967)

President of the Privy Council
- In office 4 September 1998 – 26 May 2019 (Note: Acting by Thanin Kraivichien during his regency from 13 October 2016 to 1 December 2016)
- Monarchs: Bhumibol Adulyadej; Vajiralongkorn
- Preceded by: Sanya Dharmasakti
- Succeeded by: Surayud Chulanont

16th Prime Minister of Thailand
- In office 3 March 1980 – 4 August 1988
- Monarch: Bhumibol Adulyadej
- Deputy: See list: Pramarn Adireksarn Serm Na Nakhon Thanat Khoman Boonchu Rojanastien Prachuab Soontarangkul Thongyod Chitaveera Boontheng Thongsawat Bhichai Rattakul Sonthi Bunyachai Siddhi Savetsila Chatichai Choonhavan Pong Sarasin Tienchai Sirisamphan
- Preceded by: Kriangsak Chamanan
- Succeeded by: Chatichai Choonhavan

Minister of Defence
- In office 24 May 1979 – 5 August 1986
- Prime Minister: Kriangsak Chamanan; Himself
- Preceded by: Kriangsak Chamanan
- Succeeded by: Panieng Karntarat

Commander-in-chief of the Royal Thai Army
- In office 2 October 1978 – 26 August 1981
- Preceded by: Serm Na Nakhon
- Succeeded by: Prayuth Jarumanee
Parliamentary offices
Member of the National Legislative Assembly
In office
16 December 1972 – 16 December 1973
Member of the Senate
In office
4 July 1968 – 17 November 1971
Member of the Constitution Drafting Assembly
In office
5 February 1959 – 21 June 1968

Personal details
- Born: 26 August 1920 Nakhon Si Thammarat, Pak Tai, Siam (now Mueang Songkhla, Songkhla, Thailand)
- Died: 26 May 2019 (aged 98) Ratchathewi, Bangkok, Thailand
- Party: Independent (1932–2019)
- Education: Chulachomklao Royal Military Academy; US Army Armor School
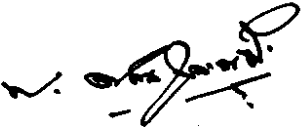
- Signature

Military service
- Allegiance: Thailand
- Branch/service: Royal Thai Army
- Years of service: 1941–1986
- Rank: General; Admiral; Air Chief Marshal
- Battles/wars: Franco-Thai War; World War II (WIA); Communist insurgency in Thailand

Prem Tinsulanonda (Thai: เปรม ติณสูลานนท์, RTGS: Prem Tinnasulanon, pronounced [prēːm tīn.nā.sǔː.lāː.nōn]; 26 August 1920 – 26 May 2019) was a Thai military officer, politician, and statesman who served as the 16th prime minister of Thailand from 1980 to 1988.

During Prem's tenure as prime minister, he was credited with ending a communist insurgency and presiding over accelerating economic growth. As president of the Privy Council, he served as Regent of Thailand from the death of King Bhumibol Adulyadej on 13 October 2016 until 1 December 2016, when Vajiralongkorn was proclaimed King. At the age of 98, Prem was the longest-living Thai prime minister. He is also the oldest regent of any country, surpassing Bavarian Prince Regent Luitpold's record, when he became the regent for king Rama X.

During the Thai political crisis of the mid-2000s, he was accused by deposed prime minister Thaksin Shinawatra and his supporters of masterminding the 2006 coup, as well as playing a hand in the appointment of the post-coup legislature and interim government of Surayud Chulanont. The military junta that ousted Thaksin denied that Prem had any important political role. Prem, as the President of the Privy Council, promoted King Bhumibol's ideologies and royal projects, though he sometimes represented himself as being the voice of the king. He urged Thai society to follow the king's advice and himself founded several welfare projects related to education, drug suppression, poverty, and national unity. A southerner, Prem had also dealt personally with trying to resolve the South Thailand insurgency. He supported societal corporatism.

== Education, military, and political career ==
Born in Songkhla Province in south Thailand, Prem was the son of Luang Winittantagum (Bueng Tinsulanonda) and Odd Tinsulanonda and had seven siblings. His father was the warden of Songkhla prison, and Prem jokingly claimed to have spent most of his childhood in prison. Prem attended Maha Vajiravudh Secondary School in Songkhla, followed by Suankularb Wittayalai School in Bangkok. He entered the Royal Thai Army Academy (now Chulachomklao Royal Military Academy) in 1941. A distinguished army officer, he entered politics in 1959, as a member of the Constitution Drafting Committee. From 1968 to 1971 he was a Senator, in 1972–73 was a Member of Parliament, and in 1976 was appointed to the Advisory Council of Prime Minister Thanin Kraivichien. Under Prime Minister Kriangsak Chamanan, he was Deputy Interior Minister in 1977–78 and Minister of Defence from 1979 to 1986.

General Prem is known for initiating the negotiations with the members of the Communist Party of Thailand. Consequently, an amnesty was declared and many communist members — including former student protesters — returned home. This helped end the fighting between the government and communist guerrillas in the 1980s.G.Cradit.Thummarngee

== Prime Minister of Thailand (1980–1988) ==
After Kriangsak retired in 1980, Prem was chosen as Prime Minister. Prem led three administrations and often shifted coalition partners.

- 42nd Administration (13 March 1980 – 19 March 1983)
  - 1st Cabinet (3 March 1980 – 11 March 1981)
    - Coalition partners: Social Action Party, Chart Thai, Democrat, Chart Prachachon and Siam Democrat
    - Major opposition: Thai Citizens' Party
  - 2nd Prem Cabinet (11 March 1981 – 8 December 1981)
    - Coalition Partners: Democrat, Chart Thai and a number of smaller parties including Siam Democrat, Ruam Thai and Social Democrat
    - Major opposition: Social Action and Prachakorn Thai
  - 3rd Prem Cabinet (9 Dec 1981 – 30 April 1983)
    - Coalition Partners: Social Action, Democrat, Chart Thai and a number of smaller parties
    - Major opposition: Prachakorn Thai
- 43rd Administration (30 April 1983 – 5 August 1986)
  - 4th Prem Cabinet (30 April 1983 – 11 August 1986)
    - Coalition partners: Social Action, Democrat, Prachakorn Thai and National Democrat (replaced by the Progressive party in Sept. 1985)
    - Major opposition: Chart Thai
- 44th Administration (5 August 1986 – 28 April 1988)
  - 5th Prem Cabinet (11 August 1986 – 28 April 1988)
    - Coalition partners: Democrat, Chart Thai, Social Action, Rasadorn
    - Major opposition: Prachakorn Thai, United Democratic, Ruam Thai, Community Action, Progressive

=== Overcoming coup attempts ===
From 1–3 April 1981, a group of army colonels known as "The Young Turks" launched a coup attempt in Bangkok. Prem escorted the King and Queen to Nakhon Ratchasima, and began negotiating with the coup leaders. On 3 April, major leaders agreed to end their "April Fool's Day" coup attempt. Some were allowed to take refuge abroad.

Another coup attempt took place on 9 September 1985. Its leaders had been involved in the previous coup four years earlier. The attempt became violent when rebel soldiers fired at the government's information centres, killing an Australian journalist and his American sound man. The coup attempt was supported by Ekkayuth Anchanbutr, a businessman who had fled the country after Prem's government issued new legislation against financial crime. By late afternoon of the same day, the rebels surrendered to the government. Most of its leaders, including Ekayuth, fled abroad.

=== Assassination attempts ===
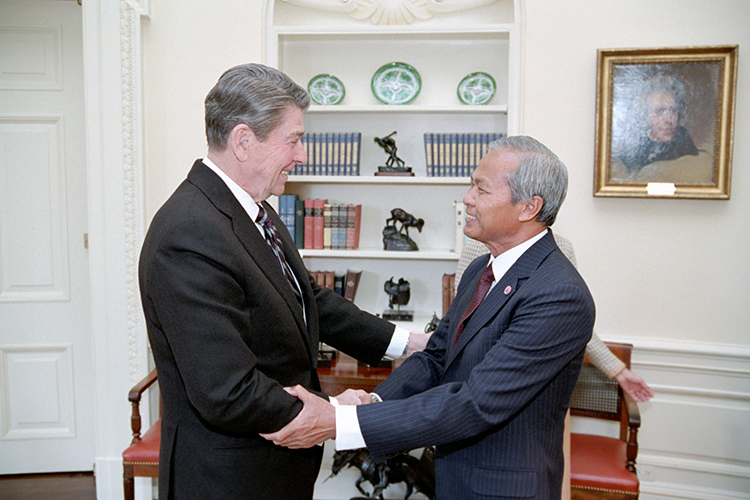
US President Ronald Reagan during a working visit of Prime Minister Prem Tinsulanonda in the Oval Office in 1984

Prem was the target of at least four assassination attempts in 1982. The investigation implicated military officers who were among the 1981 coup's leaders and former communists who opposed Prem's amnesty policy. This became one of the pretexts claimed by the coup leaders of 1991.

=== Negotiation with communist insurgents ===
Communist insurgents in Thailand, mainly led by the Communist Party of Thailand, began their armed struggle in the 1960s. After the crackdown of a students' rally at Thammasat University in October 1976, many students fled to Thailand's northeastern region to join the party. In the 1980s, Prem began changing his policy towards the communist insurgents. Previously Prem sent his men to China, persuading it to stop supporting the Communist Party of Thailand. China agreed. Prem's new policy offered amnesty to all insurgents, legally called "the communist terrorists". As a result, thousands of former students who had fled to the jungle left the communist strongholds.

== Privy councillor and statesman (1988–2019) ==
Due to political unrest in 1988, Prem dissolved parliament and called for a general election. Following the election, leaders of the winning political parties asked Prem to continue his premiership, but Prem stepped down. Consequently, Chatichai Choonhavan, head of Chart Thai Party, was chosen to be the new prime minister.

On 29 August 1988, Prem received honored as a statesman by being the second person from Pridi Banomyong.

On 4 September 1998, Prem was appointed to head King Bhumibol Adulyadej's Privy Council, becoming the successor to Sanya Dharmasakti.

During the Black May, bloody political crisis in May 1992, Prem was said to have played a crucial role in ending the military suppression of the demonstrations, consulting with King Bhumibol to end the violence and bloodshed.

=== March 2006 blast: Prem-Thaksin antagonism ===
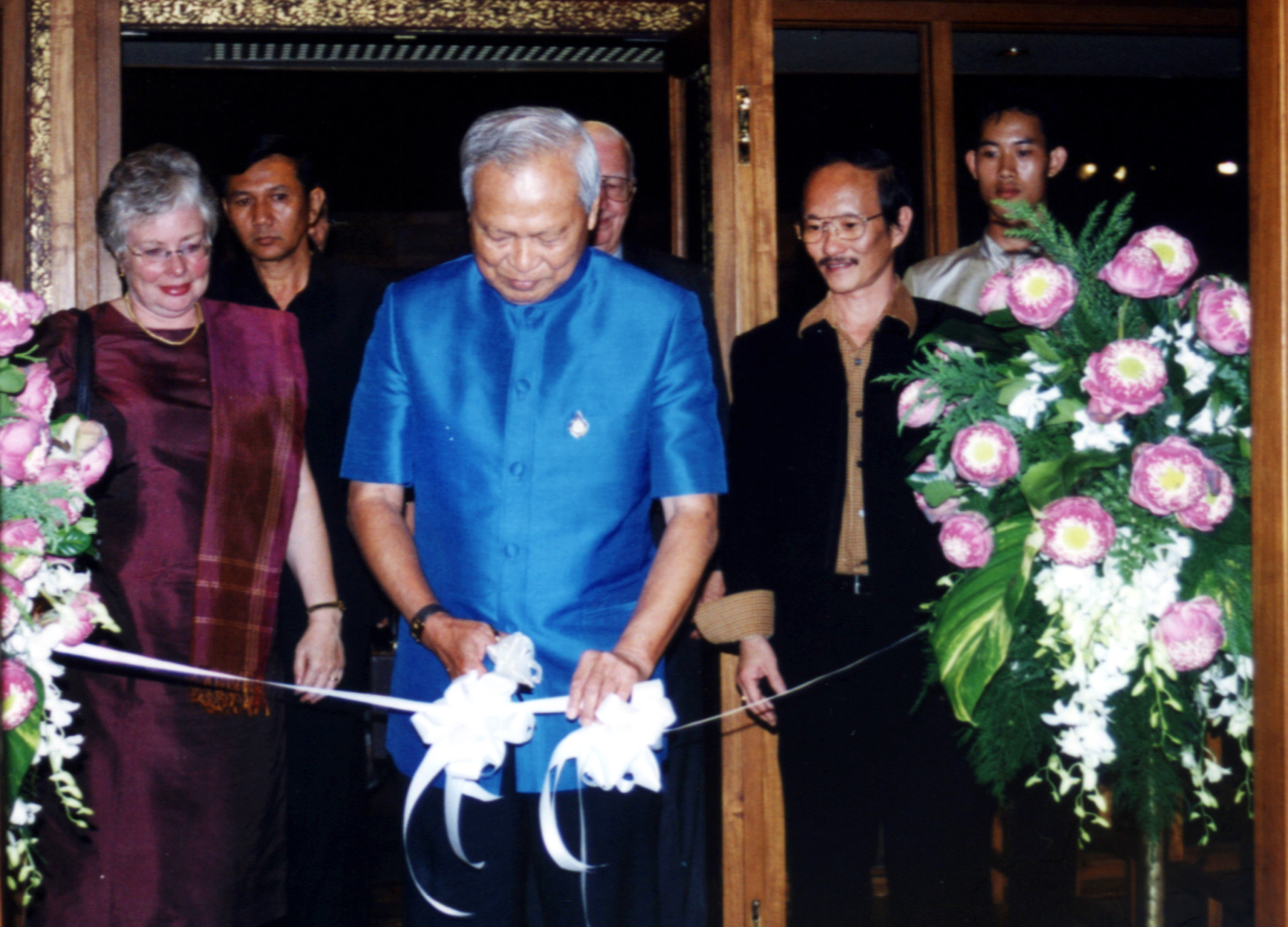
Prem as the President of the Privy Council in 2002

Prem's conflicts with Thaksin's government were apparent from 2005, although he had never mentioned Thaksin. Prem, still influential with the armed forces, became a critic of Thaksin's choice of military commanders, especially when Thaksin named his first cousin, general Chaiyasith Shinawatra, as army chief. Thaksin and his supporters immediately reacted against what they called an "extra-constitutional" individual (Prem) "meddling" in Thai politics.

Amid the tensions between Thaksin and an "extra-constitutional figure", on 9 March 2006, a small bomb exploded outside Prem's residence in Bangkok. Two people were slightly injured, including a passing British tourist. Police said the device had been hidden beneath a stone bench near an unoccupied security booth at the entrance to the residence. The guards were inside the residence at the time. Three cars parked nearby were damaged by the blast. Prime Minister Thaksin Shinawatra denied being involved in the attack.

=== Role in political crisis and 2006 coup ===
Prem found himself a leading player in the Thailand political crisis of 2005-2006. In a number of public lectures, he had criticised the attempts of politicians to tighten their grip on the army, urging the public to resist corruption and vested interests. Some commentators inferred that Prem was criticizing Prime Minister Thaksin Shinawatra and his administration.

In June 2006, Thaksin gave a controversial speech to officials claiming "the intervention of an extra-constitutional power, or figure" was seeking to damage his government. Thaksin's supporters presumed Prem was that figure, though Thaksin himself mentioned no names.

Following the September 2006 military coup, Thaksin's supporters blamed Prem, whom they decided must have been the mastermind behind the coup against Thaksin. Prem did help secure the appointment of Surayud Chulanont, another member of the King's Privy Council, as Premier, and allegedly had a say in the appointment of Surayud's Cabinet. Critics claimed the cabinet was full of "Prem's boys".

In an interview published in early-2006, Prem explained his vision of a distinctive Thai-style democracy in which the monarch remains the ultimate defender of the public interest and retains control of the armed forces. Prem used an equestrian metaphor to describe the relative roles of monarch, prime minister, and the army: "In horse racing they have the stable and the owner of the stable owns the horse. The jockey comes and rides the horse during the race, but the jockey does not own the horse. It's very easy [to comprehend]."

The issue of Prem's responsibility for the coup and the subsequent junta has been hotly contested. A ruling Military Council spokesman stated that Prem was not behind the coup. Thai police Lieutenant-General Theeradech Rodphot-hong, head of the Special Branch, cautioned that any legal proceedings would be improper as these could involve the king in a political conflict. He also urged the activists to drop their campaign as it could create conflict within the country.

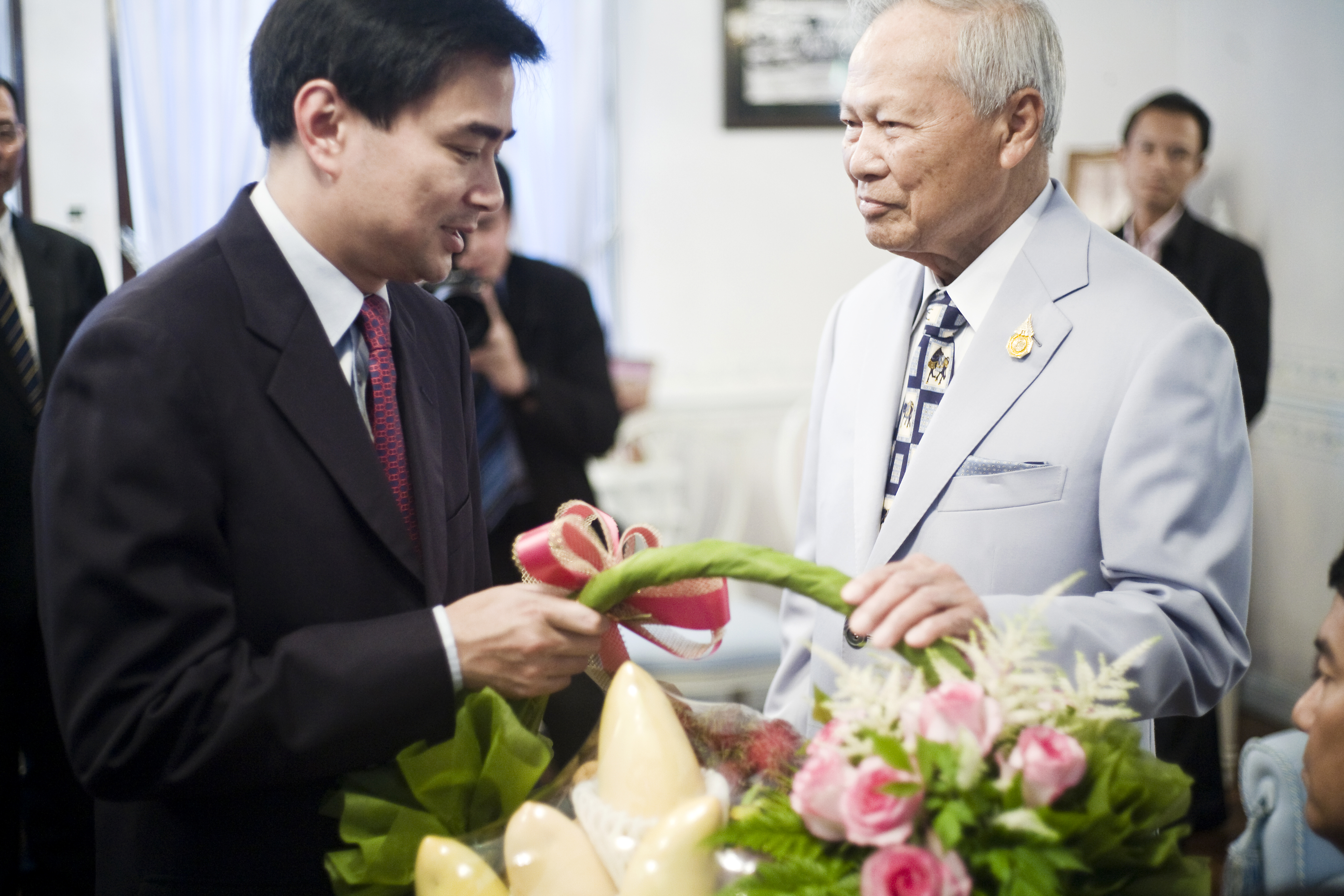
Prem with Prime Minister Abhisit Vejjajiva in 2009

On 22 July 2007, thousands of protesters, mostly Thaksin supporters, demonstrated in front of Prem's house, calling for him to resign. When the demonstration exploded into violence, police cracked down and arrested several protest leaders, including an interim National Human Rights Commissioner and a former judge, both being former members of deposed prime minister Thaksin's political party. Afterwards, junta chief Sonthi Boonyaratklin visited Prem to apologize for the protests on behalf of the government. A day later, Prime Minister Surayud Chulanont, along with 34 members of his Cabinet, went to Prem's house to apologize to Prem for failing to ensure peace. Surayud accused the protestors of trying to bring down the highest institution of the country. Government spokesman Yongyuth Mayalap said Prem categorically denied the protestors' allegations that he was behind the military coup. According to Yongyuth, Prem said that the charges were repetitive, baseless and provocative.

Prem considered taking legal action against the pro-Thai Rak Thai United Front for Democracy against Dictatorship for defamation. A source close to him said Gen Prem compiled evidence and might file defamation charges against nine key anti-coup figures. Prem continued to wield considerable influence over the military. Interior Minister Aree Wongarya and his deputy, Banyat Chansena, held talks with Prem at his residence on 1 August 2007. During the meeting, Prem gave advice on resolving the South Thailand insurgency and on providing assistance for family members of the victims in accordance with the government's Sarn Jai Thai Su Jai Tai campaign.

In summing up Prem's legacy, a Nation editorial entitled "Prem was no friend of the people", wrote that "Prem's legacy will be to inspire military top brass to maintain their strong influence in politics, to the diminishment of democracy in Thailand."

=== Prem and April 2009 protest of Thaksin's supporters ===
Before and during the mass protests of Thaksin's supporters, the UDD, Thaksin started mentioning Prem's name publicly. UDD leaders harshly blasted Prem for meddling in politics, calling him an ammatya, or 'royal puppet', or 'aristocrat', and a threat to democracy as he had never been democratically elected but had been appointed by the king. Prem did not respond to these attacks.

=== Regency (2016) ===
Upon the death of King Bhumibol Adulyadej, Prem, at age 96, became regent of Thailand as Crown Prince Maha Vajiralongkorn asked for period of mourning before being proclaimed king. For the duration of Prem's regency the Privy Council appointed Thanin Kraivichien as its interim president. At the age of 96, Prem was the oldest regent in the history of any nation.

== Personal life ==
Prem never married and once declared himself to be "married" to the army. Prem's adoptive godson is the commander-in-chief of the Myanmar Armed Forces Min Aung Hlaing, whose father personally knew Prem.

=== Educational activities ===
Prem was actively involved in many charities, including the Prem Foundation. He established the Prem Tinsulanonda International School, which opened in August 2001 in Chiang Mai Province. The campus covers 90 acres (360,000 m^{2}); the student body numbers over 400, with more than 36 nationalities represented.

== Death and funeral ==
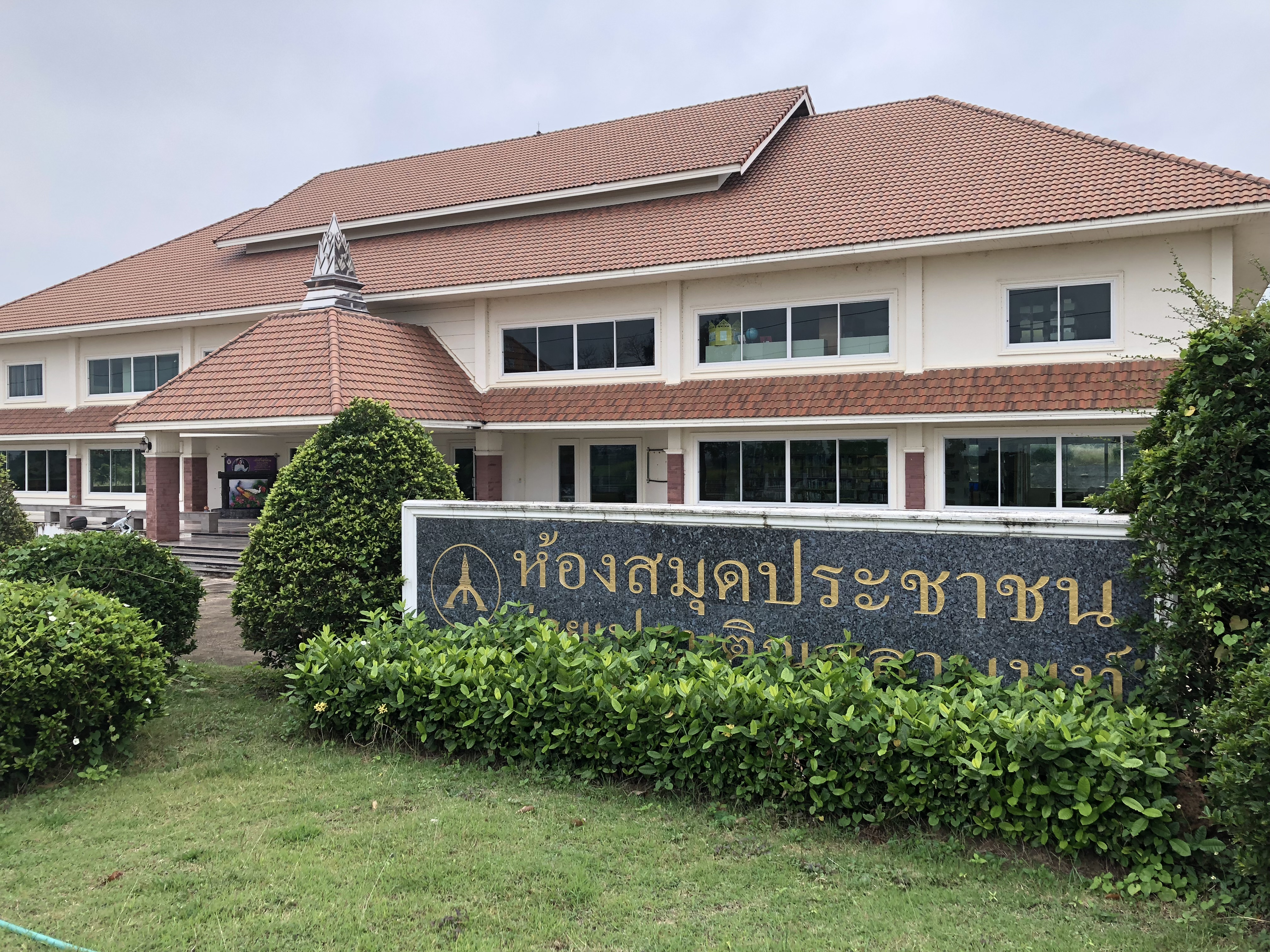
Prem Tinsulanonda Public Library at Khon Kaen

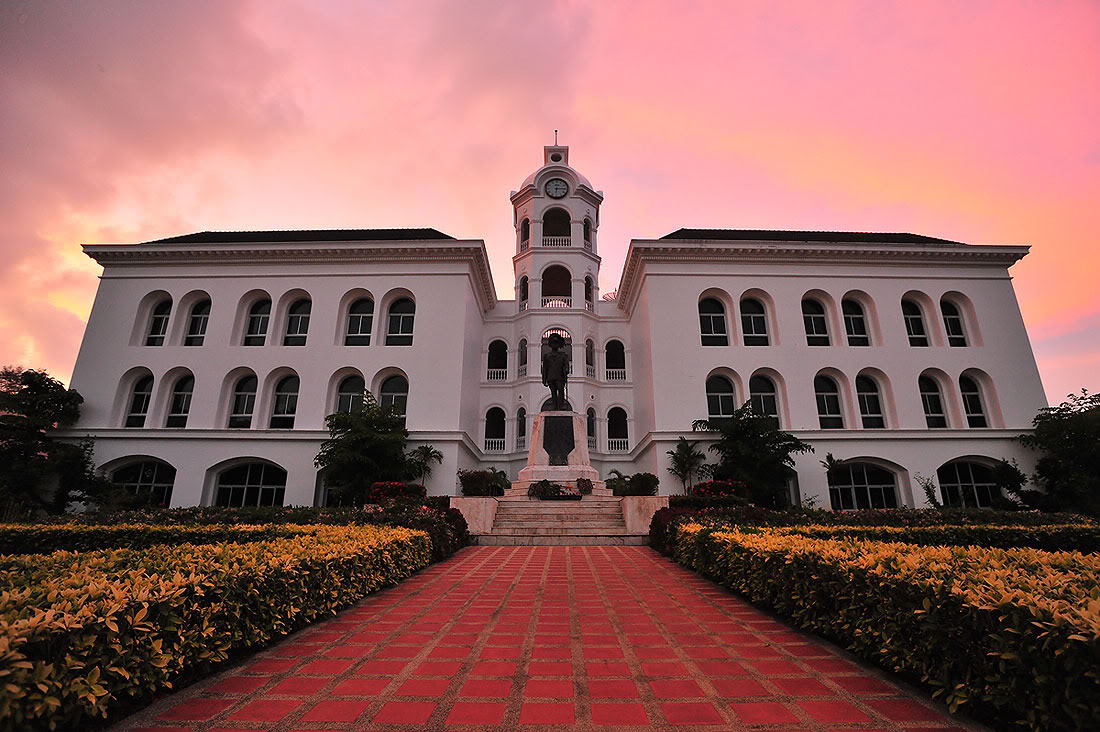
Tinsulanonda Library at Songkhla

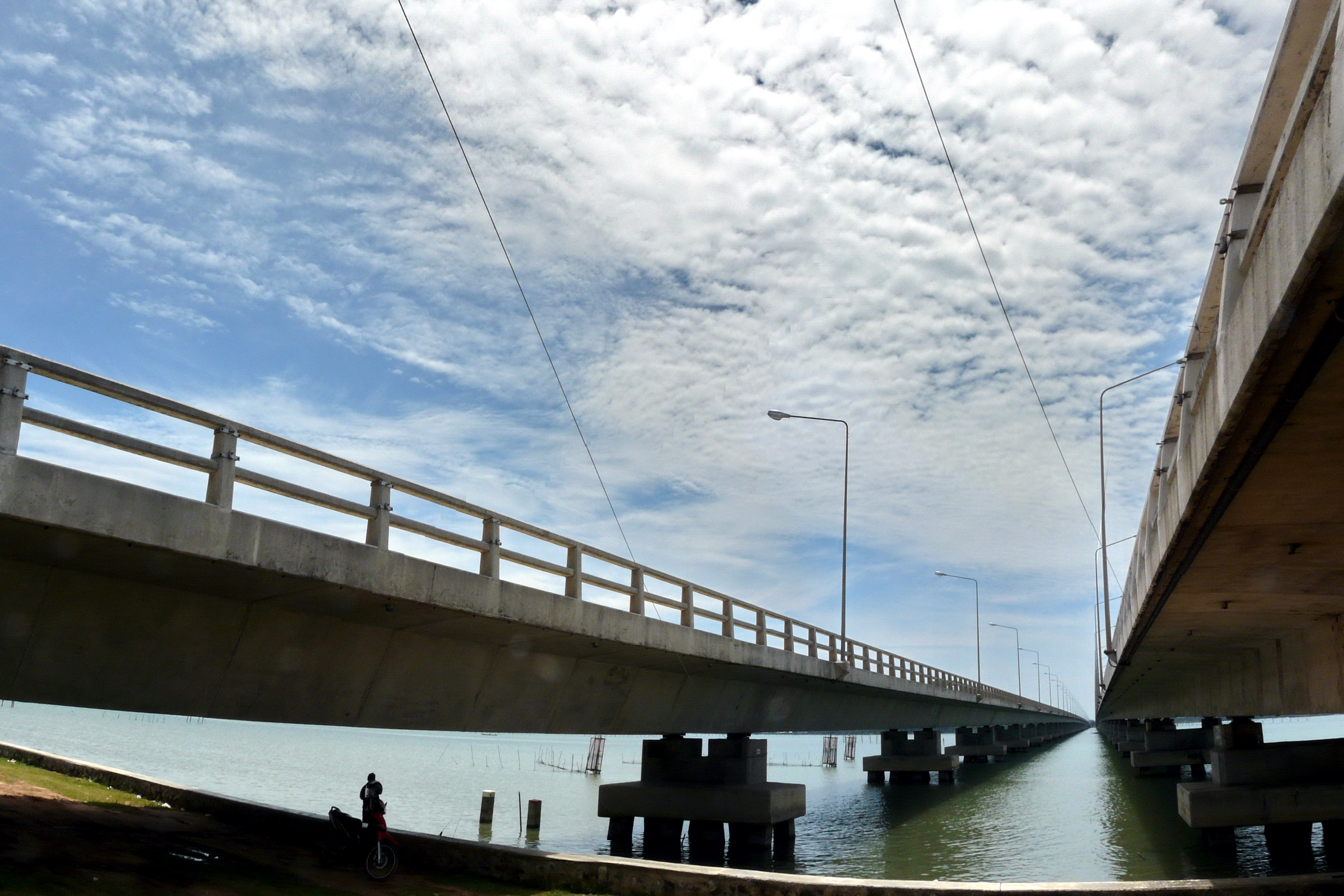
Tinsulanonda Bridge as seen from Koh Yoh Island

Prem died of heart failure at Phramongkutklao Hospital on 26 May 2019, aged 98.

King Vajiralongkorn ordered a period of mourning at the royal court for 21 days from 27 May to 17 June 2019, except for 3 June, which is the birthday of Queen Suthida.

On 8 December 2019, after the corpse was kept in the Song Tham Thorne Hall, Wat Benchamabophit, for 100 days, it was cremated at Wat Debsirindrawas Ratchaworawiharn. King Vajiralongkorn held a royal funeral procession by the Cavalry Division towards Wat Debsirindrawas. King Vajiralongkorn and Queen Suthida, along with Princess Royal Sirindhorn and Princess Bajrakitiyabha, went to the cremation and presided over the funeral ceremony. On 9 December 2019, King Vajiralongkorn sent the acting President of the Privy Council, Surayud Chulanont, as a royal representative to collect the crematory relics at Wat Debsirindrawas.

== Tributes and legacy ==
The Tinsulanonda Bridge, located in Mueang Songkhla District and Singhanakhon District, was built in honour of Prem, connecting Koh Yo on both sides between Mueang Songkhla District and Singhanakhon District. The length of the bridges is 940 meters and 1,700 meters, respectively, for a total of 2,640 meters. People in Songkhla province favor this bridge as "Pa Prem Bridge", "Tin Bridge" or "Prem Bridge", and it is considered one of the most famous tourist attractions of the province.

Prem offered to build Prem Tinsulanonda Public Library in front of the 3rd Cavalry Brigade, Prem Tinsulanonda Camp at Nam Phong District, Khon Kaen Province to provide services to people and officers in the 3rd Cavalry Brigade, Prem Tinsulanonda Camp and interested people.

A statue of Prem is located in front of the 2nd Army Military Museum, beside the 2nd Army Headquarters, in Suranaree Camp, Muang District, Nakhon Ratchasima Province. The area beneath the statue has a message that says "Born to repay the land". The signature is written in gold of General Prem Tinsulanonda. Another statue of Prem located at General Prem Tinsulanonda Historical Park, Muang District, Songkhla Province which is his birthplace.

== Honours ==
Prem has received the following decorations and awards in the Honours System of Thailand:

- 1988 - Knight of the Ancient and Auspicious Order of the Nine Gems
- 1982 - Knight Grand Cross of the Most Illustrious Order of Chula Chom Klao
- 1990 - Knight Grand Commander of the Honourable Order of Rama
- 1978 - Knight Grand Cordon of the Most Exalted Order of the White Elephant
- 1975 - Knight Grand Cordon of the Most Noble Order of the Crown of Thailand
- 1996 - Knight Grand Cross of the Most Admirable Order of the Direkgunabhorn
- 1988 - Order of Symbolic Propitiousness Ramkeerati
- 1941 - Victory Medal - Franco-Thai War
- 1962 - Victory Medal - World War II
- 1978 - Freemen Safeguarding Medal (First Class)
- 1933 - Bitaksa Rathadharmnun – Safeguarding the Constitution Medal
- 1955 - Chakra Mala Medal – Medal for Long Service and Good Conduct (Military and Police)
- 1982 - King Rama IX Royal Cypher Medal, 1st Class
- 2019 - King Rama X Royal Cypher Medal, 1st Class
- 1950 - King Rama IX Coronation Medal
- 1957 - 25th Buddhist Century Celebration Medal
- 1980 - First Class (Gold Medal) of Red Cross Medal of Appreciation

=== Foreign honours ===
- Indonesia:
  - Bintang Kartika Eka Paksi, 1st Class (1979)
- Philippines:
  - Grand Collar of the Order of Sikatuna (G.C.S.) (1983)
  - Commander of the Legion of Honor (C.L.H.) (1979)
- South Korea:
  - Order of National Security Merit, Tongil Medal (1981)
  - Order of Diplomatic Service Merit, Grand Gwanghwa Medal (1981)
- Japan :
  - Grand Cordon of the Order of the Rising Sun (1981)
- Austria :
  - Grand Decoration of Honour in Silver of the Decoration of Honour for Services to the Republic of Austria with Sash (1982)
- Pakistan :
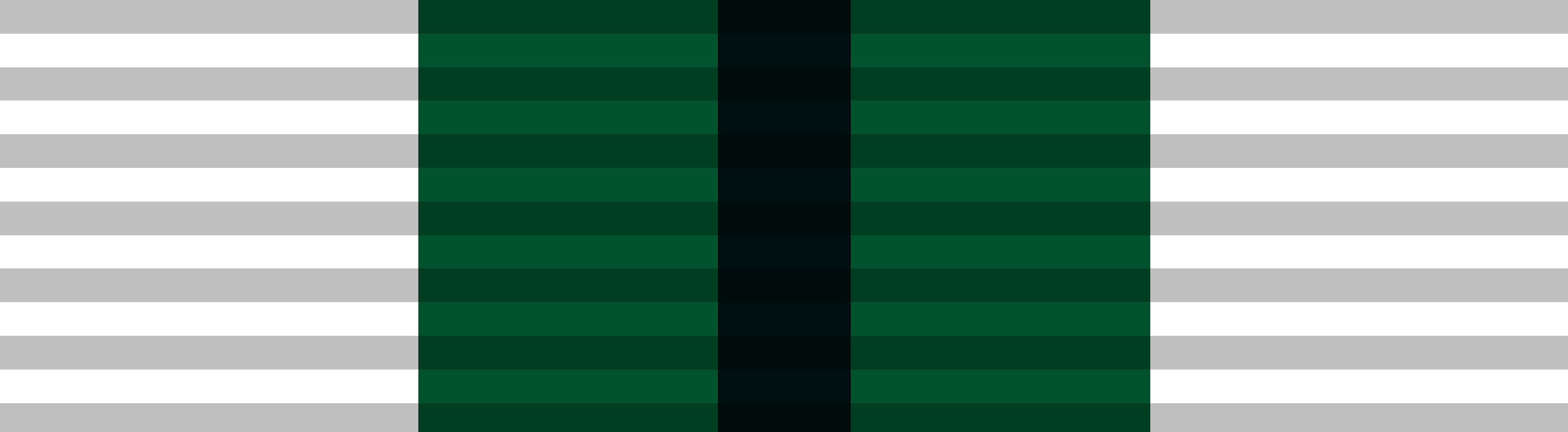
  - Hilal-e-Quaid-e-Azam (1983)
- Malaysia:
  - Honorary Grand Commander of the Order of the Defender of the Realm (S.M.N.) (1984)
- West Germany:
  - Grand Cross 1st Class of the Order of Merit of the Federal Republic of Germany (1984)
- Nepal :
  - Order of Tri Shakti Patta, First Class (1984)
- Italy:
  - Grand Cross of the Order of Merit of the Italian Republic (O.M.R.I.) (1985)
- Spain :
  - Knight Grand Cross of the Order of Isabella the Catholic (gcYC) (1987)
- France:
  - Commandeur of the Legion of Honour (1998)
- Sweden:
  - Commander Grand Cross of the Royal Order of the Polar Star (K.m.s.t.k.N.O.) (2003)
- Netherlands:
  - Knight Grand Cross of the Order of Orange-Nassau (2003)
- South Vietnam :
  - Kim Khanh Decoration, Unknown class
  - Psychological Warfare Medal, Second class

== Notes ==
Preceded by President of Zimbabwe; Robert Mugabe	The oldest current head of state or government 13 October 2016 – 1 December 2016	Succeeded by President of Zimbabwe; Robert Mugabe

Military offices
Preceded by Serm Na Nakhon	Commander of the Royal Army; 1978–1982	Succeeded by Prayuth Jarumanee
Political offices
Preceded by Kriangsak Chamanan	Minister of Defence; 1979–1986	Succeeded by Panieng Karntarat
Preceded by Kriangsak Chamanan	Prime Minister of Thailand; 1980–1988	Succeeded by Chatichai Choonhavan
Preceded by Sanya Dharmasakti	President of the Privy Council; 1998–2019	Succeeded by Surayud Chulanont
Regnal titles
Sirikit	Regent of Thailand; 13 October – 1 December 2016; During beginning of Vajiralongkorn's reign	Anad panyarachun
