= Chamlong Srimuang =

Thai activist and politician (born 1935)

- จำลอง ศรีเมือง
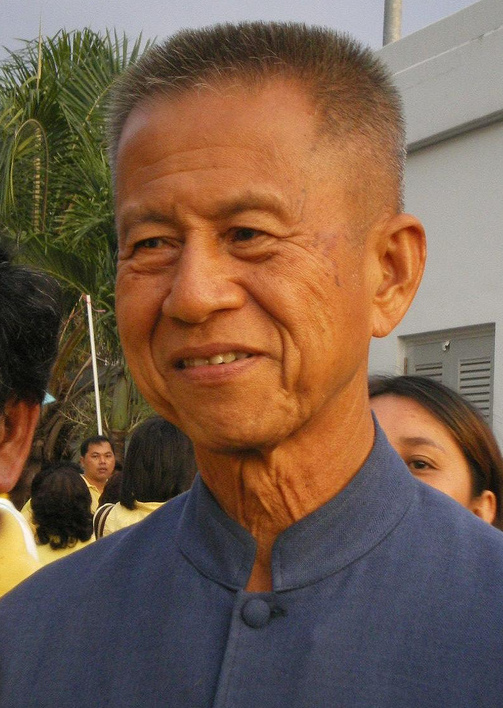
- Chamlong Srimuang in 2008

Deputy Prime Minister of Thailand
- In office 25 October 1994 – 19 May 1995
- Prime Minister: Chuan Leekpai

Leader of Palang Dharma Party
- In office 1988–1992
- Preceded by: Office established
- Succeeded by: Boonchu Rojanastien

10th Governor of Bangkok
- In office 14 November 1985 – 22 January 1992
- Preceded by: Asa Meksavan
- Succeeded by: Krisda Arunvongse na Ayudhya

Personal details
- Born: 5 July 1935 (age 91) Samre, Thon Buri, Thonburi (Modern day Bangkok), Siam
- Party: Palang Dharma (1988-1996)
- Other political affiliations: People's Alliance for Democracy (2006-)
- Spouse: Major Sirilak Kheolaor (m. 1964)
- Education: Chulachomklao Royal Military Academy; U.S. Naval Postgraduate School
- Profession: Political activist; politician; army officer

Military service
- Allegiance: Thailand
- Branch/service: Royal Thai Army; Volunteer Defense Corps
- Years of service: 1959-1985 (RTA); 1986-1995 (VDC)
- Rank: Major General; VDC Col.
- Battles/wars: Vietnam War; Laotian Civil War; Battle of Lima Site 85

Chamlong Srimuang (Thai: จำลอง ศรีเมือง, RTGS: Chamlong Simueang; born 5 July 1935) is a Thai activist and former politician. A former general, he was a leader of the "Young Turks" military clique, founded and led the Palang Dharma Party, served for six years as governor of Bangkok, led the anti-military uprising of May 1992, and is a prominent member of the People's Alliance for Democracy, a group strongly opposed to former prime minister Thaksin Shinawatra. Chamlong had supported the military junta that overthrew Thaksin in a coup. A devout Buddhist and follower of the Santi Asoke sect, he is now celibate, a vegetarian, and claims to have no worldly possessions. Chamlong Srimuang received the Ramon Magsaysay Award in the category of Government Service in 1992.

== Early life and education ==
Chamlong's father, a Chinese immigrant from Shantou, died when Chamlong was a baby. His mother was of Chinese ancestry, but was born in Thailand. Chamlong had an older brother who was sent to live in China with his grandmother and died there as a boy.

Following his father's death, Chamlong's family moved into the home of a retired naval officer, where his mother was a servant. They later lived with his mother's aunt, where she and Chamlong spun jute thread. When Chamlong was twelve, his mother married Chote Srimuang, a postman, and Chamlong took his last name.

Chamlong went to Ban Somdej Chao Phraya High School in Thonburi, where he was a top student. He then entered the Armed Forces Academies Preparatory School, Thailand and was accepted into Chulachomklao Royal Military Academy, where he graduated in Class 7. He developed a close relationship with his classmates Pallop Pinmanee and Manoonkrit Roopkachorn, both of whom would play important roles in Thai politics for decades.

== Military career ==
Newly commissioned Second Lieutenant Chamlong was assigned to the Signal Corps in Bangkok as a platoon leader. He received advanced training in military communications at Fort Monmouth, New Jersey, and Fort Gordon, Georgia.

On his return to Thailand, he married Major Sirilak Kheolaor on 14 June 1964. They had met during an Army-Navy rugby match when Chamlong was a cadet. Soon afterwards, Chamlong was sent to the Schofield Barracks in Hawaii for a six-month course on military signal equipment.

He later served in Laos as a communications officer supporting Thai units fighting the communist Pathet Lao and the North Vietnamese Army. He returned to Thailand to attend the Army Command and General Staff College, and also underwent six months of counterinsurgency training.

Assigned to South Vietnam as part of Thailand's ten-thousand strong troop deployment during the Vietnam War, Chamlong served as a senior planning and operations officer for an infantry division in Biên Hòa Province. He served in South Vietnam for one year, before being assigned to the Bangkok-based Thailand Military Research and Development Center.

In 1972, Chamlong attended the U.S. Navy's Postgraduate School in Monterey, California, where he completed a two-year management course. For his master's degree thesis, he wrote a study of labor unrest in Thailand. Following his graduation, he returned to the Military Research and Development Center.

== Young Turk ==
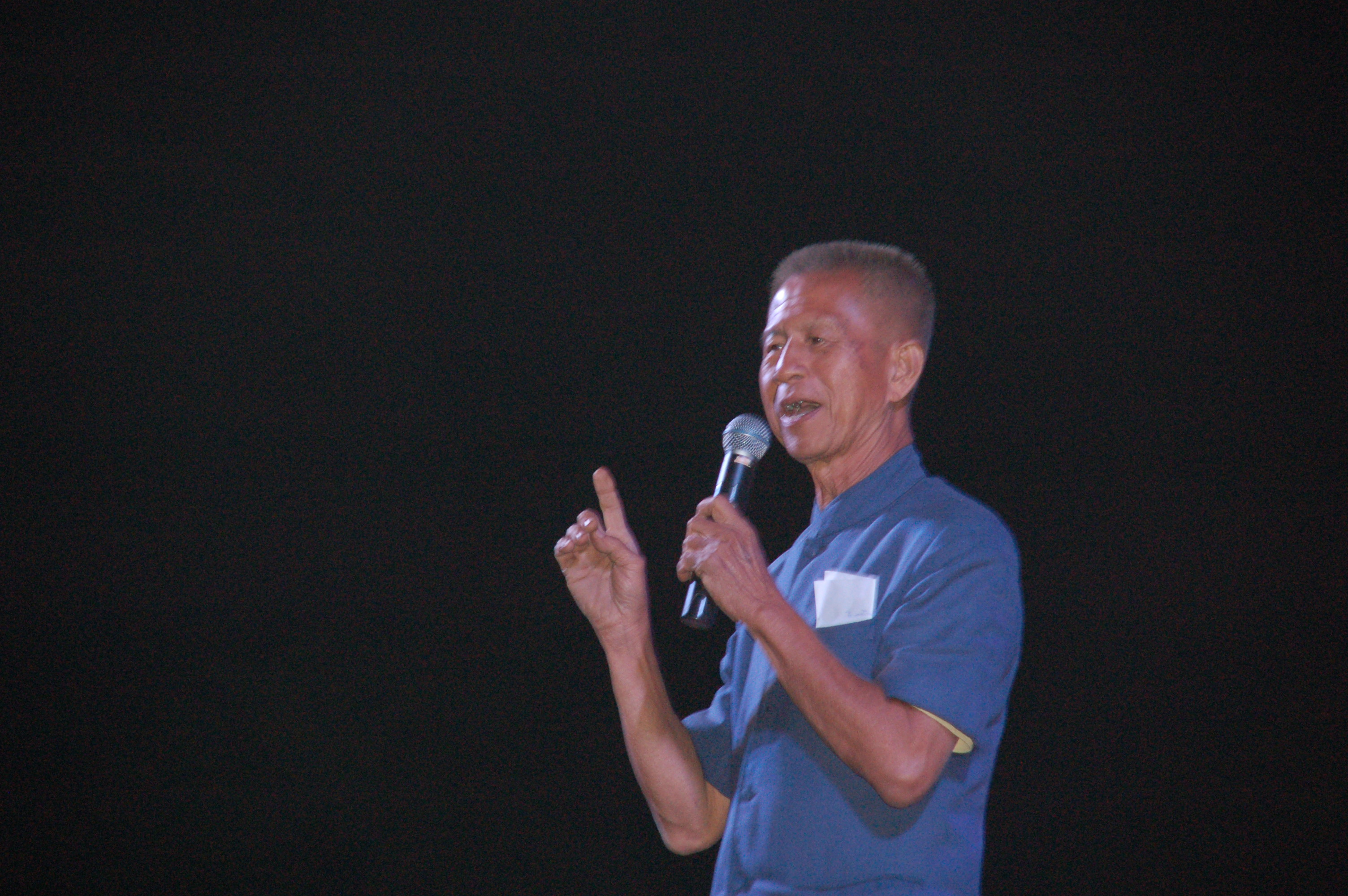
Maj. Gen. Chamlong Srimuang at Leadership School, Kanchanaburi

During the 1970s, Chamlong and other Class 7 alumni formed the Young Military Officers Group, commonly referred to as the "Young Turks". The Young Turks espoused an ideology of incorruptible leadership and anti-leftism.

Also during the 1970s, conflicts between the pro-democracy and students movement on the one hand, and rightist paramilitaries on the other, Chamlong admittedly attended rallies of the right-wing "Village Scouts". The Young Turks supported the military coup against the elected government of Seni Pramoj, following the bloody 6 October 1976 incident. The role the Young Turks played in the brutal massacre of student demonstrators gathered at Thammasat University, if any, is still debated.

The Young Turks also supported the coup against the military government of Tanin Kraivixien, who was seen as too far right. The coup installed Kriangsak Chomanand, Chamlong's commanding officer, as prime minister. In 1979, Kriangsak appointed then Lieutenant Colonel Chamlong to the military-dominated Senate of Thailand. The late-1970s and the ascension of Young Turk mentor General Prem Tinsulanonda to the premiership in 1980 marked the apex of Class 7's influence in Thai politics. Prem appointed Chamlong as his secretary, an extremely powerful position.

== Secretary to Prem ==
On 1 April 1981, the Young Turks, frustrated at the slow pace of political reform under Prem, staged a coup, later nicknamed the "April Fools Day" coup. Chamlong refused to take part, instead standing by Prem. The coup collapsed after the royal family, accompanied by Prem to Nakhon Ratchasima Province, announced their support for troops loyal to the government.

A rift between Chamlong and Prem later erupted when the lower house of parliament passed a law legalizing abortions in cases of rape and in situations when a pregnant woman's life was in danger. Chamlong was strongly opposed to what he viewed as "free abortions", and he resigned as Prem's secretary and successfully lobbied the senate to veto the law.

Chamlong next was assigned to teach psychology and politics at the National Defense College.

== Santi Asoke ==
Chamlong had long been a devout Buddhist, and had particular respect for the monks Buddhadasa Bhikkhu and Panyanantha Bhikkhu. In 1979, Chamlong met Phra Phothirak (Bodhirak), founder of the Santi Asoke sect. Soon afterwards, Chamlong and Sirilak vowed to abstain from sexual relations and, in Sirilak's words, to start "a new life together in purity and friendship". In the early-1980s, he spent his free time touring the countryside, giving talks about Phothirak's brand of ascetic Buddhism, and urging people to abstain from alcohol, cigarettes, meat, and gambling.

On 1 October 1985, Chamlong was promoted from colonel to major general. Two days later, he resigned from the army and registered as a candidate for governor of Bangkok.

== Governor of Bangkok and leader of the Palang Dharma Party ==
Chamlong ran for governor as an independent, supported by an organization calling itself Ruam Phalang (United Force), made up mostly of volunteers from Santi Asoke. He ran based on promises of integrity and anti-corruption. The campaign relied heavily on inexpensive posters and door-to-door visits, in contrast to more traditional giant posters and political rallies. Chamlong's candidacy was belittled by the then Democrat Party leader Pichai Rattakul, as "sidewalk" ware, while the Democrat incumbent was likened as "department store" ware. Chamlong won the election with half a million votes, twice as many as his most popular competitor, incumbent Chana Rungsaeng.

As governor, Chamlong reopened bidding for several city projects. He claimed that the lower cost of new bids saved the city 80 million baht (nearly US$3 million). He persuaded city street sweepers to sweep streets for the entire day, rather than just during the morning. Chamlong encouraged road-side hawkers, technically illegal, to stop selling their wares once a week, on Wednesdays. His anti-poverty projects included paving footpaths in squatter communities and establishing a chain of thrift stores for the poor.

In 1988, Chamlong established the Palang Dharma (Moral Force) Party (PDP) to contest nationwide parliamentary elections. Chamlong himself remained in the governorship of Bangkok, while a huge slate of 318 PDP candidates vied for seats across the nation. Half of the PDP's candidates were Santi Asoke devotees (sometimes referred to as the "temple faction"), and the party's ideological platform clearly reflected Santi Asoke teachings. However, some key posts went to outsiders (referred to as the "political faction"), including the post of secretary-general, which went to Dr Udomsilp Srisaengnam.

The PDP provoked much criticism, most of it aimed at Chamlong and Santi Asoke. Chamlong was accused of playing an active role in the student massacres of 1976 (charges which he denied). Santi Asoke was accused of being an illegal sect with heretical teachings.

The election was a disappointment for the PDP. Only fourteen candidates won seats: ten in Bangkok and four in the provinces. Santi Asoke candidates fared particularly poorly. As a result of the 1988 elections, Chamlong's former patron, Prem Tinsulanonda, was replaced as prime minister by Chatichai Choonhavan, leader of the Chart Thai Party.

It was widely speculated that Secretary-General Udomsilp wanted to join Chatichai's government coalition, where he had been promised the Ministry of Public Health. Chamlong declared that he would rather dissolve the party than let Udomsilp succeed. Udomsilp later resigned as PDP Secretary-General and was succeeded by Vinai Sompong, Chamlong's personal secretary. Thus began a decade long division between the "temple faction" and the "political faction" that would forever plague the PDP.

Chatichai's government reopened investigations into Santi Asoke, which led to a decision by the Supreme Council of the Sangha to defrock Phothirak. Phothirak sidestepped the defrocking by abandoning his yellow robes for white ones and refraining from calling himself a monk.

In 2007 and 2008, Santi Asoke monks presented themselves in brown robes again. Apart from Bhotirak many of them were ordained in the orthodox manner before they joined Santi Asoke; they remained monks, albeit without the "monks' pass" issued by the monastic hierarchy.

In the 1990 re-elections for the governorship of Bangkok, Chamlong gained 62 percent of all votes, twice as many as his most popular rival. In the 1990 election for the Bangkok City Council, the PDP won by a landslide, with 49 out of 55 seats.

Chamlong was governor during the signing of the deal for the project later to be known as the "Thai Stonehenge". It consists of some 500 incomplete concrete pillars which are part of the unfinished Hopewell mass transit project, and is considered an unofficial monument to massive corruption.

== Opposition to Suchinda Kraprayoon ==
=== Prelude to violence ===
On 23 February 1991, army chief General Suchinda Kraprayoon overthrew the government of General Chatichai Choonhavan. The coup-makers, who called themselves the National Peace-Keeping Council (NPKC), appointed Anand Panyarachun as prime minister. Anand's interim government promulgated a new constitution and scheduled parliamentary elections for 22 March 1992.

Chamlong decided to resign as governor and become a PDP parliamentary candidate. The PDP won by a landslide in Bangkok, with 32 of 35 seats. Outside Bangkok, however, the PDP won only nine seats. Meanwhile, PDP candidate Krisda Arunvongse na Ayutthaya became Governor of Bangkok. A government coalition with 55 percent of the lower house was formed without the PDP and appointed Suchinda as prime minister. Massive public protests immediately followed. Chamlong played a major role in the protests and started a hunger strike on 4 May. On 9 May, Suchinda responded by saying that he would support a constitutional amendment making individuals who had not been elected to parliament ineligible for the premiership. Chamlong ended his fast on 9 May as tensions dissipated. That same evening, he also announced his resignation as leader of the PDP to allay suspicions that his actions were politically motivated.

=== Bloody May ===
Royal intervention on the night of 20 May. Left to right: Chamlong Srimuang, Suchinda Kraprayoon, and King Bhumibol Adulyadej (seated).

The truce was short-lived. On 17 May, the two leading government parties announced that, while they supported the constitutional amendment, they also favored transitional clauses that would permit Suchinda to serve as prime minister for the life of the current parliament. By that evening, 200,000 demonstrators filled Sanam Luang to call for Suchinda to resign. Chamlong led the protesters on a 2 km march to Government House. As they reached the intersection of Rachadamnoen and Rachadamnoen Nok Avenues, they were halted at Phan Fa Bridge, which had been barricaded with razor wire by the police. After negotiations failed, some protesters stampeded and broke through the barricade. The police retaliated with water cannons and clubs after protesters tried to commandeer one of the fire trucks. Stones and Molotov cocktails were soon flying. Chamlong used a loudspeaker to exhort the marchers not to attack the police, but his words were lost in the unrest.

Over the next several hours, hundreds of troops arrived to quell the protest. Just after midnight, Suchinda declared a State of Emergency, making gatherings of more than ten people illegal. Chamlong remained near Phan Fa Bridge and the nearby Democracy Monument. Around 04:00, soldiers threatened the nearly 40,000 protesters by firing M16 rifles. An hour and a half later, they began firing again. Using a loudspeaker, Chamlong asked the soldiers to stop shooting. By morning, the army moved more troops in, and crowds grew even larger at other sections of the city.

Early on the afternoon of 18 May, Suchinda publicly accused Chamlong of fomenting violence and defended the government's use of force. Shortly after, troops firing continuously in the air, moved in on the crowd surrounding Chamlong. The troops handcuffed and arrested Chamlong.

The crowds did not disperse, and the violence escalated. After troops had secured the area around Phan Fa Bridge and the Democracy Monument, protests shifted to Ramkhamhaeng University across the city. By the evening of 19 May, some fifty thousand people had gathered there.

=== Royal intervention ===
Early on the morning of 20 May, Princess Sirindhorn addressed the country on television, calling for a stop to the unrest. Her appeal was rebroadcast throughout the day. In the evening, her brother, Crown Prince Vajiralongkorn, broadcast a similar public appeal. Then at 21:30, a television broadcast of King Bhumibol, Suchinda, and Chamlong was shown, in which the king demanded that the two put an end to their confrontation and work together through parliamentary processes. Following the broadcast, Suchinda released Chamlong and announced an amnesty for protesters. He also agreed to support an amendment requiring the prime minister to be elected. Chamlong asked the demonstrators to disperse, which they did. On 24 May 1992, Suchinda resigned.

Major General Chamlong later apologized for his role in the events: "I wanted a peaceful rally", he said afterwards. "I can't deny some responsibility for the damage and loss of life. I feel deeply sorry for those families whose members were killed in the incident, for those people who were injured and their families". Nevertheless, he noted that "we were right in what we have done".

== Downfall of the Palang Dharma Party ==
=== The Chuan 1 government ===
Major General Chamlong was re-elected in parliamentary elections held on 13 September 1992, along with 46 other PDP MPs. While campaigning, he had refused to accept a cabinet seat if the PDP were to join the government. The PDP joined the government coalition of Democrat Chuan Leekpai. In the face of increasing tension between the "temple faction" and the "political faction", Chamlong stepped down as party leader in January 1993, and was succeeded by business tycoon, Boonchu Rojanastien, of the "political faction". Chamlong then established an organic farm and a leadership school in Kanchanaburi Province.

Temple faction frustration increased at the slow pace of reform and development of the Chuan government. In the March 1994 elections for the Bangkok City Council, the PDP won only 24 out of 55 seats, a humiliating defeat compared to the 49 seats it won in 1990. Soon after, Chaiwat Sinsuwong of the temple faction resigned as Deputy Governor of Bangkok.

Finally, in late 1994, Chamlong returned to active politics and regained control of the party. Boonchu and other political faction cabinet ministers were replaced by temple faction loyalists and new blood, including newcomer Thaksin Shinawatra (who became foreign minister). The PDP soon withdrew from the government over the Sor Por Kor 4-01 land reform corruption scandal, causing the government of Chuan Leekpai to collapse.

=== The Thaksin-era ===
Major General Chamlong was strongly criticized for his handling of internal PDP politics in the last days of the Chuan government and retired from politics. He picked Thaksin as the new PDP leader. In parliamentary elections in July 1995, a severely weakened PDP won only 23 seats. The PDP joined the coalition government led by Banharn Silpa-Archa of the Chart Thai party. Thaksin was appointed deputy prime minister in charge of Bangkok traffic.

In early 1996, Chamlong decided to return to politics to contest the Bangkok governor elections, facing incumbent Krisda Arunwongse na Ayudhya (who had defected from the PDP). In May 1996, Thaksin and four other PDP ministers quit the Banharn Cabinet (while retaining their MP seats) to protest widespread allegations of corruption, prompting a cabinet reshuffle, and possibly giving Chamlong a boost in the elections. Chamlong lost the election to Bhichit Rattakul, an independent. Chamlong's failure to buttress the PDP's failing power base in Bangkok amplified internal divisions in the PDP. Afterwards, Chamlong announced again that he was retiring from politics, and returned to his leadership school and organic farm.

The PDP pulled out of the Banharn government in August 1996. In subsequent elections in November 1996, the PDP suffered a fatal defeat, winning only one seat in parliament. The PDP soon imploded, with most members resigning. Several members (including Thaksin Shinawatra and Sudarat Keyuraphan) later formed the Thai Rak Thai party and won a landslide election victory in 2001.

== Opposition to IPO of Thai Beverage ==
Chamlong leaped back into the public view when, in 2005, he led a coalition of 67 religious and 172 anti-alcohol groups to protest the initial public offering (IPO) of Thai Beverage PCL (maker of Beer Chang and Mekhong rum) in the Stock Exchange of Thailand. Along with thousands of Santi Asoke supporters, he camped in front of the Stock Exchange of Thailand for several nights on the eve of Visakha Bucha, citing "a grave threat to the health, social harmony and time-honored ethics of Thai culture" if the IPO was approved. The IPO, which would have raised US$1.2 billion making it the largest listing in SET history, was indefinitely postponed by the SET. Thai Beverage eventually list in Singapore.

== Leader of the People's Alliance for Democracy ==
Major General Chamlong became a key leader of the People's Alliance for Democracy, a coalition of protesters against the government of Thaksin Shinawatra and a key player in the Thailand political crisis of 2005-2006. After a military coup overthrew the Thaksin government, Chamlong was rewarded for his role in Thaksin's downfall by being appointed to parliament. After 2007, his political stance was in support of the military and against the government of Prime Minister Surayud Chulanont.

=== 2008 political crisis ===
After saying "I will never resign in response to these threats. I will not dissolve the House. I will meet the King today to report what's going on", Sundaravej conversed with King Bhumibol Adulyadej at Klai Kangwon Palace. For the fifth day, 30,000 protesters, led by the People's Alliance for Democracy, occupied Sundaravej's Government House compound in central Bangkok, forcing him and his advisers to work out of a military command post. Thai riot police entered the occupied compound and delivered a court order for the eviction of protesters. Chamlong ordered 45 PAD guards to break into the main government building on Saturday. Three regional airports remained closed and 35 trains between Bangkok and the provinces were cancelled. Protesters raided the Phuket International Airport tarmac on the resort island of Phuket resulting in 118 flights cancelled or diverted, affecting 15,000 passengers.

Protesters also blocked the entrance of the airports in Krabi and Hat Yai (which was later re-opened). Police issued arrest warrants for Sondhi Limthongkul and eight other protest leaders on charges of insurrection, conspiracy, unlawful assembly and refusing orders to disperse. Meanwhile, Gen. Anupong Paochinda stated: "The army will not stage a coup. The political crisis should be resolved by political means". Samak and the Thai Party ruling coalition called urgent parliamentary debate and session for 31 August.

On 4 and 5 October 2008, Srimuang and rally organiser, Chaiwat Sinsuwongse of the People's Alliance for Democracy, were detained by the Thai police led by Col. Sarathon Pradit, by virtue of a 27 August arrest warrant for insurrection, conspiracy, illegal assembly and refusing orders to disperse (treason) against him and eight other protest leaders. At the Government House, Sondhi Limthongkul, however, stated demonstrations would continue: "I am warning you, the government and police, that you are putting fuel on the fire. Once you arrest me, thousands of people will tear you apart". Srimuang's wife, Ying Siriluck visited him at the Border Patrol Police Region 1, Pathum Thani. Other PAD members still wanted by police include Sondhi, activist MP Somkiat Pongpaibul and PAD leaders Somsak Kosaisuk and Pibhop Dhongchai.

=== 2011 general election "vote-no" campaign ===
A key supporter of Thailand's version of the "vote-no" movement during run-up to the general election of 2011, Chamlong did not get the chance to vote no. His name and his wife's name were not on the list of eligible voters at their polling place, as they had voted in advance in the previous election and did not realise that they had to inform election officials that they did not want to do so in this one.

== Honours, decorations and awards ==
- Knight Grand Cordon (Special Class) of the Most Exalted Order of the White Elephant (1989)
- Knight Grand Cordon (Special Class) of the Most Noble Order of the Crown of Thailand (1987)
- Victory Medal - Vietnam War (1972)
- Border Service Medal (1969)
- Chakra Mala Medal - Medal for Long Service and Good Conduct (Military and Police) (1972)
- First Class of Boy Scout Citation Medal of Vajira (1988)

=== Foreign Honour ===
- Republic of Vietnam :
  - Gallantry Cross, with Silver star
  - Vietnam Campaign Medal
- South Korea :
  - Order of Diplomatic Service Merit, Class 2 (1981)
- Japan :
  - Grand Cordon of the Order of the Sacred Treasure (1992)

Political offices
| Preceded by Asa Meksawan | Governor of Bangkok; 1985–1992 | Succeeded by Kritsada Arunwong na Ayutthaya |
