= Chaiwat Sathawornwichit =

Thai politician

- ชัยวัฒน์ สถาวรวิจิตร
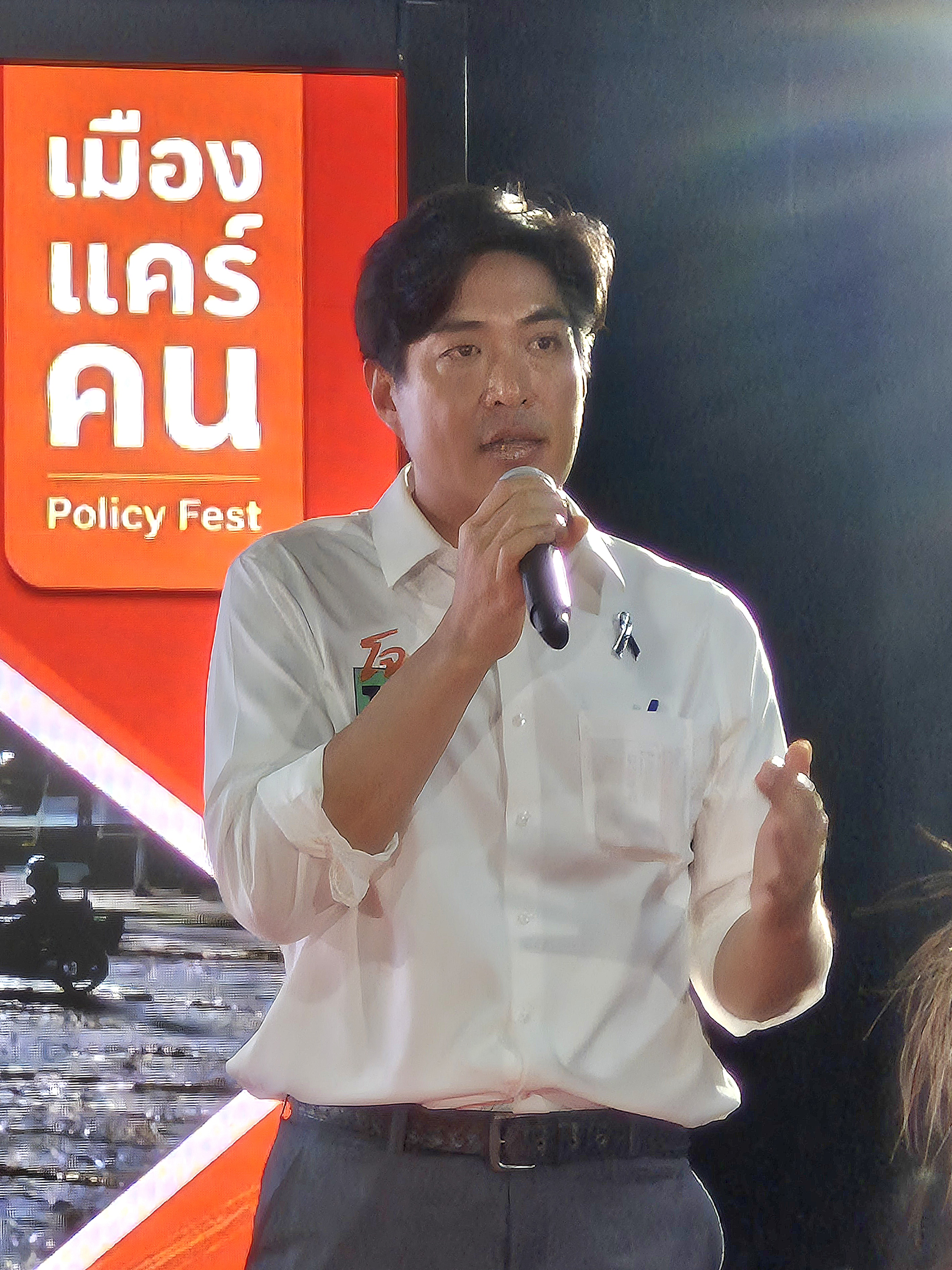
- Chaiwat in 2026

Member of the House of Representatives
- In office 14 May 2023 – 7 May 2026

Personal details
- Born: Chaiwat Sathawornwichit; 30 August 1981 (age 45) Talat Phlu, Bangkok, Thailand
- Party: People's
- Education: Chulalongkorn University (BSE); Japan Advanced Institute of Science and Technology (MS & PhD).

Chaiwat Sathawornwichit (Thai: ชัยวัฒน์ สถาวรวิจิตร), also known as Joe, is a Thai politician and former Member of Parliament, and a deputy leader of the People's Party. Chaiwat is the People's Party nominee for the 2026 Bangkok Gubernatorial Election.

== Early life & education ==
Born on August 30, 1981, in Bangkok's Talat Phlu district, he received his secondary education at Suankularb Wittayalai School. He graduated with first-class honors from the Computer Engineering program, Faculty of Engineering, Chulalongkorn University. He subsequently earned both a Master of Science in Information Science and a Doctor of Philosophy in Information Science from the Japan Advanced Institute of Science and Technology (JAIST).

== Career ==
=== 2026 Bangkok Gubernatorial Election ===
Chaiwat resigned as a Member of Parliament on 6 May 2026, a day after he was named the People's Party candidate.

The People's Party launched a campaign titled "Easy Bangkok", with Chaiwat's campaign pledging to make Bangkok an "easy city", through amending the Bangkok Metropolitan Administration Act, and improving public transport and services.

He received the endorsement of Bhichit Rattakul, the 12th Governor of Bangkok.

He concluded his election campaign with a final rally at Benchasiri Park on the evening of 26 June. In the election, he placed third with 188,144 votes, representing 8.31% of the total vote, a result that fell short of expectations.
