= 1975 Bangkok gubernatorial election =

- 10 August 1975
- Turnout: 13.86%
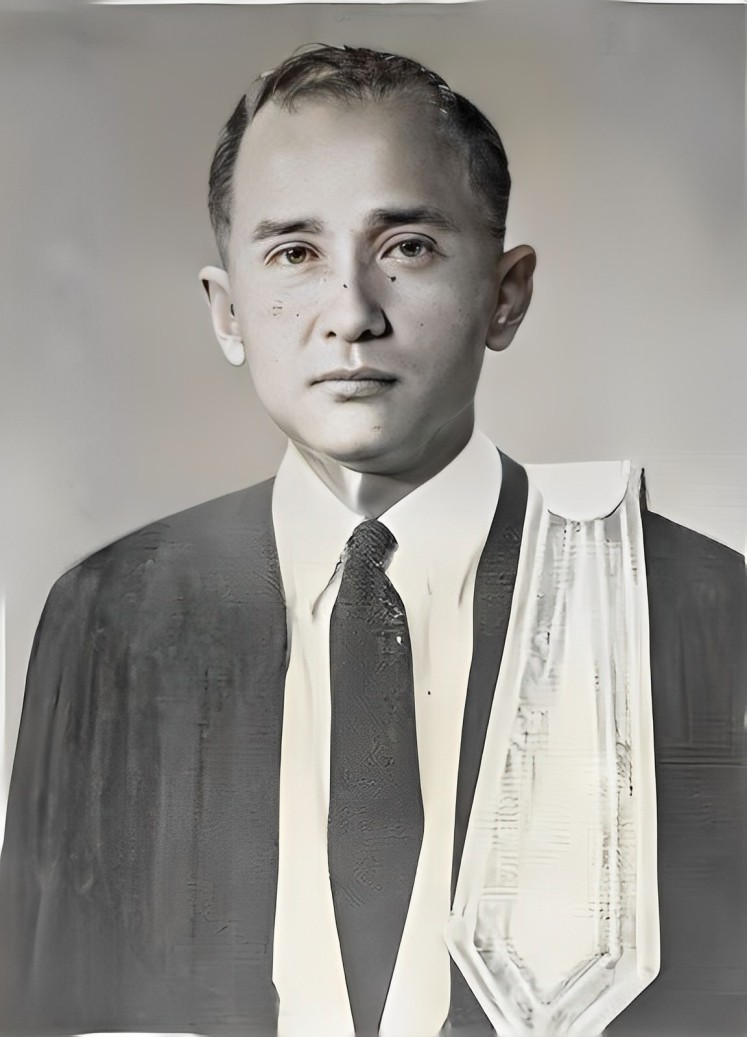

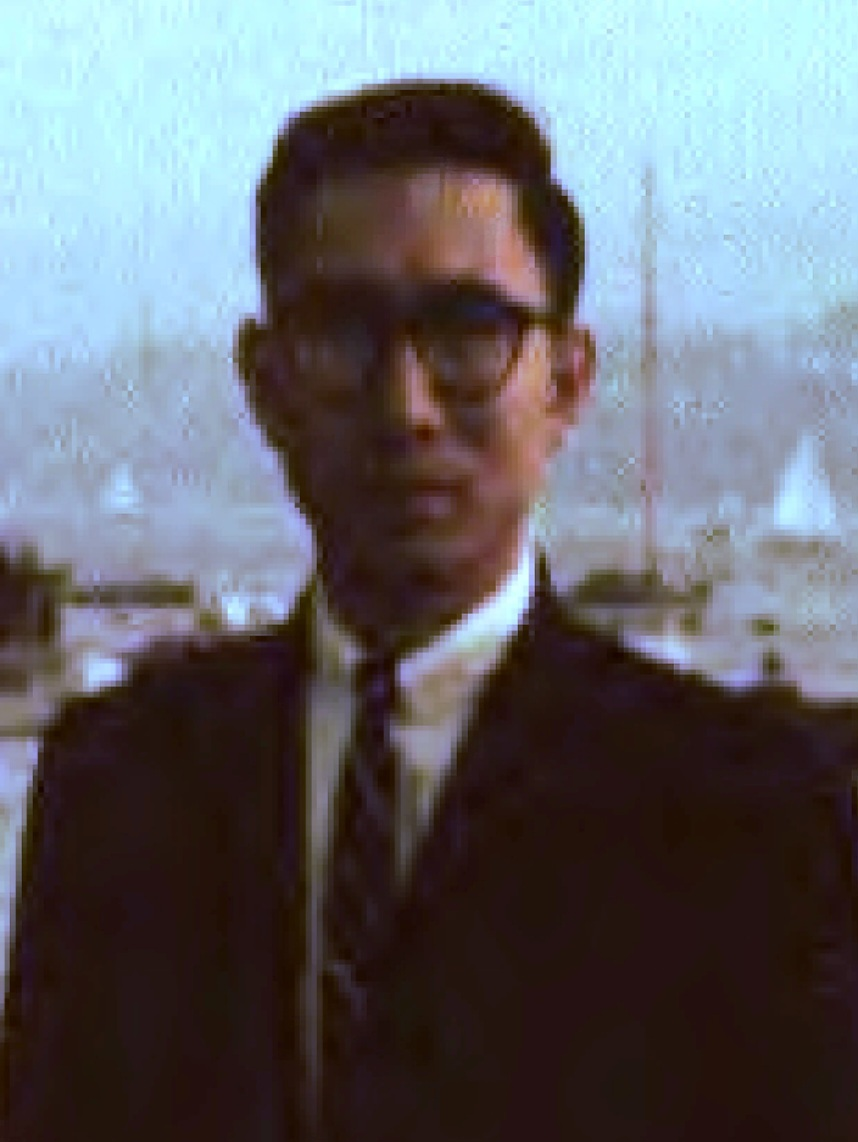
Candidate	Thammanoon Thien-ngern	Athit Urairat	Chomphu Atchinda
Party	Democrat	New Force Party	Bangkok Thonburi Development
Popular vote	99,247	91,678	39,440
Percentage	39.16%	36.17%	15.56%
Governor before election
Sai Hutacharoen
Appointed
Elected Governor
Thammanoon Thien-ngern
Democrat

The 1975 Bangkok gubernatorial election was held to elect the Governor of Bangkok on 10 August 1975. It was the first time the governorship of Bangkok or any province in Thailand was contested in a democratic election. Previously, the Governor of Bangkok was an appointed position as established in 1973, but new laws in 1975 made it an elected position. The election was won by Thammanoon Thien-ngern of the Democrat Party. Although he was elected to a four-year term, Thammanoon was dismissed in 1977 by Prime Minister Thanin Kraivichien. The appointment system was restored until democratic elections resumed in 1985.

== Background ==
Bangkok as a special local administrative area was created in 1971 by the merger of Phra Nakhon and Thonburi Provinces. In Thailand, each province is headed by a Governor appointed by the Ministry of Interior. Chamnan Yaovabun was the first governor and took office on 1 January 1973. He was followed by At Visutyothaphiban, Siri Santabutra, and Sai Hutacharoen who were all likewise appointed. Concurrently, Thai politics was undergoing a wave of liberalisation towards democracy since the 1973 Thai popular uprising in October that ousted Thanom Kittikachorn as Prime Minister after almost 10-years in power. Democratic elections were held in January 1975, where the centrist Democrat Party emerged with the largest share of seats.

As part of this overall push towards a liberal democracy, the 1975 Bangkok Metropolitan Administration (BMA) Act was passed. It established the Bangkok Metropolitan Administration as the local government body and made the governor an elected position. The Act aimed to improve accountability for the city's leadership, as well as its responsiveness to Bangkok's issues - namely issues relating to rapid urbanisation, public transportation and flood management. Another reason for making the governorship electable was because of Bangkok's size, complexity and national importance as a capital with stronger institutions and a population that was more politically active than the provinces.

== Candidates ==
Number	Candidate		Notes
1	Democrat Party	Thammanoon Thien-ngern	Secretary General of the Democrat Party (1970–1976)
2	New Force Party	Athit Urairat	
3	Bangkok Thonburi Development Group	Chomphu Atchinda	
4	Independent	Thiambun Thinonbutra	
5	Independent	Thainga Suwanthat	Former Member of the House of Representatives

== Results ==
1975 Bangkok gubernatorial election
Candidate	Party	Votes	%
Thammanoon Thien-ngern	Democrat Party	99,247	39.16
Athit Urairat	New Force Party	91,678	36.17
Chomphu Atchinda	Bangkok Thonburi Development	39,440	15.56
Thiambun Thinonbutra	Independent	17,625	6.95
Thainga Suwanthat	Independent	5,444	2.15
Total		253,434	100.00
Democrat Party gain			

After the Democrats secured the most votes, Thammanoon Thien-ngern was sworn in as governor and served until his dismissal in 1977.
