= Anucha Burapachaisri =

Thai politician

- อนุชา บูรพชัยศรี
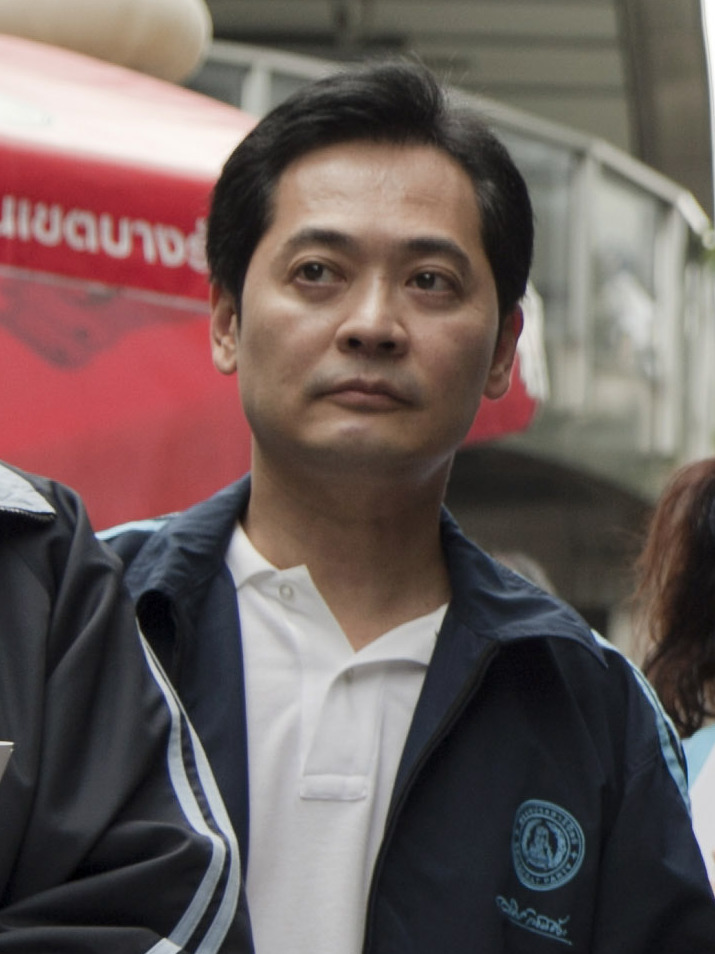
- Anuncha in 2012

Member of the House of Representatives
- In office 7 July 2023 – 12 December 2025
- Constituency: Party-list

Government Spokesperson
- In office 18 August 2022 – 10 July 2023
- Prime Minister: Prayut Chan-o-cha
- Preceded by: Narumon Pinyosinwat
- Succeeded by: Thanakorn Wangboonkongchana

Personal details
- Born: Anucha Burapachaisri; 23 January 1967 (age 59) Bangkok, Thailand
- Party: Democrat Party (2007–2023, 2026–)
- Other political affiliations: United Thai Nation Party (2023–2025); Bhumjaithai Party (2025–2026)
- Spouse: Sudarat Burapachaisri (née Arunvongse na Ayudhya)
- Education: University of Adelaide (BSE); University of Leeds (MSc); Sasin Graduate Institute of Business Administration (MBA)

Anucha Burapachaisri (Thai: อนุชา บูรพชัยศรี, pronounced [/ʔa.nu.t͡ɕʰaː buː.ra.pʰa.t͡ɕʰaj.sriː]) is a Thai politician and businessman. He served as a party-list Member of the House of Representatives and was a government spokesperson in the administration of General Prayut Chan-o-cha.

== Early life & education ==
Anucha, nicknamed "James," was born on 23 January 1967 in Bangkok into a family of businesspeople. He completed his lower secondary education at Assumption College, where he was a classmate of Anutin Charnvirakul. He later graduated from Sacred Heart College in Australia for his upper secondary education. He earned a bachelor's degree in Mechanical Engineering from the University of Adelaide, Australia; a master's degree in Fuel and Combustion Engineering from the University of Leeds in the United Kingdom; and another master's degree in Finance and Marketing from the Sasin Graduate Institute of Business Administration of Chulalongkorn University.

He also completed the National Defence Course, Class 63, at the National Defence College of Thailand under the National Defence Studies Institute of the Royal Thai Armed Forces Headquarters.

== Political careers ==
He entered politics for the first time in the 2007 general election as a Bangkok Member of the House of Representatives for the Democrat Party, and was re-elected again in 2011. In the 2019 general election, he once again ran for a parliamentary seat in Bangkok under the same party, but was unsuccessful in winning the election.

He later resigned from the Democrat Party, one of his notable political roles was serving as Secretary to the Minister of Education under Nataphol Teepsuwan.

In August 2022, he was assigned to serve as Deputy Government Spokesperson in the administration of General Prayut Chan-o-cha. He was later appointed Deputy Secretary-General to the Prime Minister for Political Affairs.

In the 2023 general election, he moved to the United Thai Nation Party. After Pirapan Salirathavibhaga resigned from his position as a Member of the House of Representatives, Anucha moved up on the party-list ranking and subsequently became a party-list MP.

Later, in the 2026 general election, he joined the Bhumjaithai Party and ran as a party-list candidate, but was not elected.

=== 2026 Bangkok gubernatorial election ===
Only a few months after the election, he resigned from the Bhumjaithai Party and later appeared at the "AI Demo Day: Bangkok Builders Edition" event organized by the Democrat Party at Benjakitti Park on 12 May of the same year. The event aimed to promote the use of AI innovation for urban and economic development. His appearance attracted significant public attention, as he was widely seen as one of the two leading potential candidates for the upcoming Bangkok gubernatorial election scheduled for 28 June, just over a month away. The other potential contender was Dr. Pichet Rerkprecha, CEO of LINE Plus, the parent company of LINE Thailand.

On 16 May, the Democrat Party officially introduced him as its candidate at the party headquarters. His campaign platform can be broadly summarized as "Clean, Convenient, Comfortable, and More" for Bangkok.

After the launch event, he immediately went to the scene of the accident where a freight train collided with an air-conditioned bus at a railway crossing near Makkasan station, accompanied by the Democrat Party's candidate for the Ratchathewi District Council.

He concluded his election campaign with a final rally on the evening of 26 June at the Queen Sirikit National Convention Center. Anucha received 106,739 votes in the election, placing fourth with 4.72% of the total vote. Approximately one hour after the polls closed, he and the Democrat Party congratulated Chadchart Sittipunt on his victory.

== Personal life ==
He is married to Sudarat Burapachaisri, daughter of Capt. Krisda Arunvongse na Ayudhya, the 11th Governor of Bangkok (served from 1992 to 1996).

== Royal decorations ==
- 2024 – Knight Grand Cordon (Special Class) of the Most Exalted Order of the White Elephant
- 2013 – Knight Grand Cordon (Special Class) of the Most Noble Order of the Crown of Thailand
