= New Palangdharma Party =

Thai political party

New Palangdharma Party พรรคพลังธรรมใหม่ New Power of Dharma Party
- Leader: Ravee Maschamadol
- Secretary-General: Nitat Raiyawa
- Founded: March 2, 2018; 7 years ago
- Headquarters: 293 Soi Mit Anan, Therd Damri Road, Thanon Nakhon Chai Si, Bangkok, Thailand
- House of Representatives: 0 / 500

New Palangdharma Party (NPD, Thai: พรรคพลังธรรมใหม่, พธม., RTGS: Phak Phalangtham Mai) is a political party in Thailand that was launched in March 2018 by former secretary-general of the original Palang Dharma party, Ravee Maschamadol, and other members of now defunct party, though its founder, Chamlong Srimuang did not join, citing his retirement from politics. The party was also joined by many former members of Mahachon Party and New Aspiration Party. The party describes its ideology as "Moral Democracy".

In 2019 general elections, the party stood in 134 constituencies and 24 party-list candidates with only one elected to the house. After government formation talks, New Palangdharma along with other 10 single-member party join a 19-party coalition led by the Palang Pracharath Party. In 2023 the party sent 11 party-list members to contest that year's election.

== Election results ==
Election	Total seats won	Total votes	Share of votes	Outcome of election	Election leader
2019	1 / 500	35,099	0.10%	Junior partner in governing coalition	Ravee Maschamadol
