= Boonchu Rojanastien =

Thai banker and politician

- บุญชู โรจนเสถียร
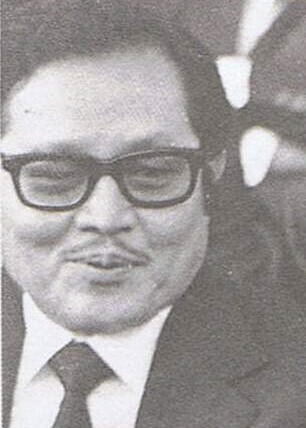

President of Bangkok Bank
- In office 1977–1980

Deputy Prime Minister of Thailand
- In office 29 September 1992 – 25 October 1994
- Prime Minister: Chuan Leekpai

Leader of Palang Dharma Party
- In office 1992–1995
- Preceded by: Chamlong Srimuang
- Succeeded by: Thaksin Shinawatra

Minister of Finance
- In office 17 March 1975 – 20 April 1976
- Prime Minister: Kukrit Pramoj
- Preceded by: Sawet Piampongsan
- Succeeded by: Sawet Piampongsan

Personal details
- Born: 20 January 1921 Chonburi, Thailand
- Died: 19 March 2007 (aged 86) Bangkok, Thailand
- Party: Democrat Party; Palang Dharma; Social Action Party
- Education: Thammasat University
- Profession: Accountant

Boonchu Rojanastien (Thai: บุญชู โรจนเสถียร; RTGS: Bunchu Rotchanasathian, Chinese: 黃聞波, Huang Wenbo born January 20, 1921, Chon Buri Province, Thailand, died March 19, 2007, Bangkok) was a Thai banker. Touted as Thailand's first "economics tsar", he served in the government of Kukrit Pramoj in 1975 and 1976. During his tenure as finance minister, he initiated a policy of "ngern phan" (money allocation), which distributed several billion baht of government funds to 5,000 tambon, or local government, councils. His populist policies would later be embraced under the administration of Thaksin Shinawatra.

== Early life and business career ==
Boonchu was the eldest of five children born to a Thai Chinese carpenter of Hainanese origin in Chon Buri Province. He married Renu Rojanastien, and had two children Krip Rojanastien and Ora Rojanastien. He excelled at school and entered Thammasat University, graduating with a degree in accounting. He then opened his own accounting firm, and shortly after that joined Bangkok Bank. He eventually became president of the bank, from 1977 to 1980, and led the institution through expansion and the establishment of branches across Thailand.

== Political career ==
He became involved in politics in 1973 under the administration of Prime Minister Sanya Dharmasakti. Boonchu was appointed a senator and he played a role in drafting the Constitution in 1974.

He joined Social Action Party and was elected as a Member of Parliament from Prachin Buri Province. This was during the short reign of Seni Pramoj, who was succeeded by his brother, Kukrit Pramoj.

Under Kukrit, Boonchu served as deputy prime minister and finance minister, and he initiated his populist "ngern phan" program of doling out billions of baht to local governments.

He left politics in 1983 and returned to banking, serving as chairman of Siam City Bank, only to return to politics in 1986 as the head of the Kijprachakhom Party. The party later consolidated with other parties to form the Ekaphap Party, of which Boonchu served as deputy. He later led the Palang Dharma Party.

Boonchu eventually joined the Democrat Party and served as a cabinet member and then adviser to the first government of Chuan Leekpai.

"The future of a political party hinges on its policies. Any inappropriate policies will just simply fade away," was Boonchu's famous motto.

Boonchu left politics in 1998 after serving on the House Budget Committee.

== Later years ==
Boonchu's family weathered the 1997 East Asian financial crisis. He then started the Chiva-Som International Resort and Spa in Hua Hin, which at its peak, became one of the best Resorts and Spas and was awarded the top resort and spa of the world.

He suffered from leukemia, and was treated at Vichaiyudh Hospital in Bangkok, where he died on March 19, 2007.
