= Bangkok Metropolitan Administration Act =

1985 Thai law

Parliament of Thailand
- Long title: Bangkok Metropolitan Administration Act, B.E. 2528 (1985)
- Territorial extent: Thailand
- Assented to by: King Bhumibol Adulyadej
- Royal assent: 20 August 1985

Amended by
- Act (No. 2), B.E. 2534 (1991) Act (No. 3), B.E. 2539 (1996) Act (No. 4), B.E. 2542 (1999)

Related legislation
- Bangkok Metropolitan Administration Act, B.E. 2518 (1975)
- Status: In force (amended)

The Bangkok Metropolitan Administration Act, B.E. 2528 (1985) (Thai: พระราชบัญญัติระเบียบบริหารราชการกรุงเทพมหานคร พ.ศ. 2528) is a 1985 Thai law providing for the governance of Bangkok. The law established the role of the Governor of Bangkok as a directly elected official, separate from the national government. It also devolved certain powers to the Governor of Bangkok and Bangkok Metropolitan Administration (BMA), and established other functions as subsidiary to Thailand's Ministry of Interior.

== Aftermath ==
Following the act, the first Gubernatorial Election for Bangkok was held in 1985. Independent candidate Chamlong Srimuang won the election with over 400,000 votes.

The BMA currently shares power with over 30 national agencies.

== Criticism ==
The Act has been criticized for limiting the powers of the Governor of Bangkok to those that directly impact residents of Bangkok, including flooding and traffic.

In 2025, incumbent Governor of Bangkok Chadchart Sittipunt outlined plans to amend the Bangkok Metropolitan Administration Act, and launched a website to solicit students' opinions on amending the Act.

In 2026, People's Party MPs within the National Assembly of Thailand have advocated for a reform of the Act, including drafting amendments to modernize Bangkok's administrative structure. The proposed Act would "decentralize authority and give residents more direct neighborhood control", including allowing districts to collect more local taxes, create clearly defined Bangkok and national agency jurisdictions, and allow residents to recall officials and propose ordinances. The proposal would also introduce elected district mayors, and restore the 12 member district councils that were suspended in the 2014 coup.

A 13 May 2026 opinion piece in the Bangkok Post by climate and inclusion policy specialist Thunpicha Greigarn criticized the Act in advance of the 2026 Bangkok Gubernatorial Election, writing, "Bills must pass through the Ministry of Interior. Traffic management is fragmented across 37 agencies. A governor can reduce harm at the edges -- and a good one does -- but the root causes require a transfer of power that only parliament can authorise."

Thunpicha added,

"Many of the real levers sit beyond the governor's reach: with the Department of Land Transport, with national energy policy, with a parliament that has little incentive to devolve power to Bangkok. Even declaring Bangkok a pollution control zone, a step that would simply unlock a dedicated budget for air quality work, required Chadchart Sittipunt to petition the central government. He asked. They stalled. The smog returned."
