= Rattakul =

Rattakul is a surname. Notable people with the surname include:

- Bhichai Rattakul (1926–2022), Thai politician
- Bhichit Rattakul (born 1946), Thai politician
