= Krisda Arunvongse na Ayudhya =

Thai politician, professor and architect

Captain Krisda Arunvongse na Ayudhya
- กฤษฎา อรุณวงษ์ ณ อยุธยา
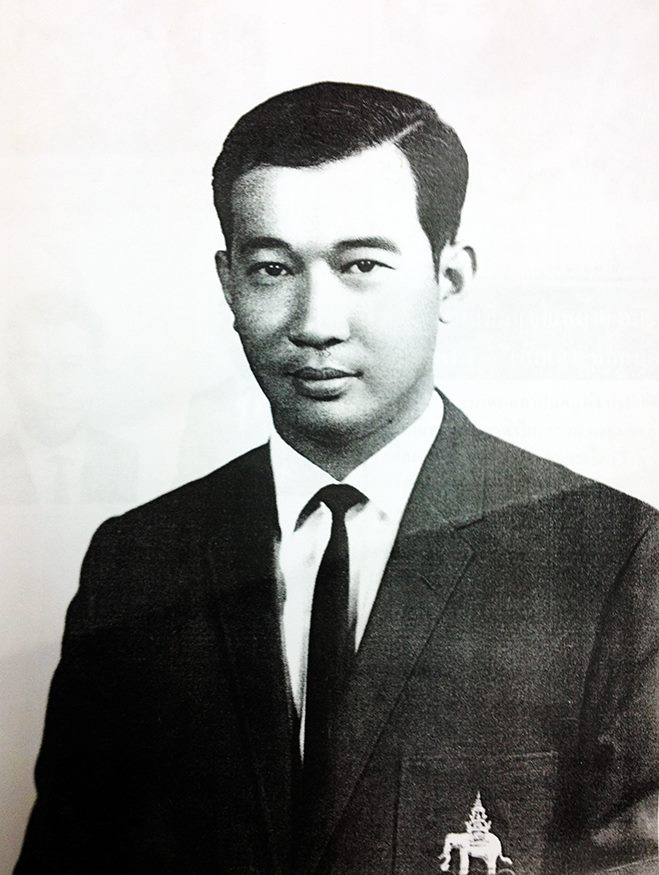
- Krisda before 1960s

11th Governor of Bangkok
- In office 19 April 1992 – 1 June 1996
- Preceded by: Chamlong Srimuang
- Succeeded by: Bhichit Rattakul

Personal details
- Born: 9 January 1932 Bangkok, Siam
- Died: 12 January 2010 (aged 78) Bangkok, Thailand
- Party: Independent
- Other political affiliations: Palang Dharma Party
- Education: Massachusetts Institute of Technology; École des Beaux-Arts
- Profession: Politician; professor; architect; army officer

Military service
- Allegiance: Thailand
- Branch/service: Royal Thai Army; Volunteer Defense Corps
- Rank: Captain; VDC Col.

Krisda Arunvongse na Ayudhya (Thai: กฤษฎา อรุณวงษ์ ณ อยุธยา, RTGS: Kritsada Arunwong na Ayutthaya; January 9, 1932 – January 12, 2010) was a Thai politician professor and architect. He served as the Governor of Bangkok from April 19, 1992, until April 18, 1996.

== Education ==
Krisda received both his bachelor's degree and his master's degree in architecture from Massachusetts Institute of Technology (M.I.T). The government of France awarded him a scholarship to study architecture for six months at the École des Beaux-Arts in 1960.

== Career ==
Krisda was employed in the Royal Thai Army's Public Works Department from 1957 to 1960. He held the Military rank of Captain. He competed at the 1960 Summer Olympics and the 1964 Summer Olympics as a sports shooter.

From 1960 until 1989, Krisda was a professor and lecturer of architecture at Chulalongkorn University. During his tenure at Chulalongkorn, he served as the fourth Dean of the Faculty of Architecture from 1974 until 1978.

Krisda founded the Casa Company, which designed several prominent buildings throughout Bangkok, including the headquarters on Thai Airways International located on Phahon Yothin Road.

He served as the Deputy Governor of Bangkok for public works from 1990 until 1992. Krisda was then elected as the Governor of Bangkok for four years from April 19, 1992, until April 18, 1996.

== Later life ==
He was honored as a National Artist of Thailand for his work in visual arts and architecture in 2007.

Krisda Arunvongse na Ayudhya died of coronary artery disease on January 12, 2010, at Siriraj Hospital, at the age of 78. His funeral was held at Wat Benjamabopitr.

== Academic rank ==
- Professor

Political offices
Preceded by Chamlong Srimuang	Governor of Bangkok; April 19, 1992 – April 18, 1996	Succeeded by Bhichit Rattakul
