= Mallika Boonmeetrakool Mahasook =

Thai politician

Mallika Boonmeetrakool Mahasuk
- มัลลิกา บุญมีตระกูล มหาสุข
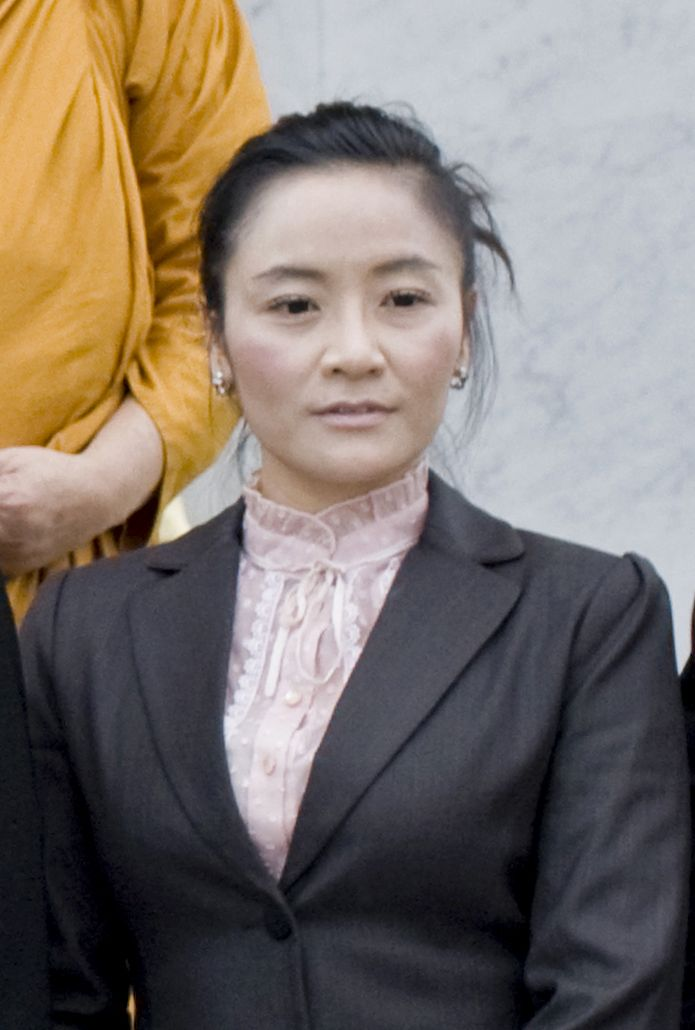
- Mallika in 2009

Member of the House of Representatives
- In office 27 September 2022 – 20 March 2023
- Constituency: Party-list

Advisor to the Minister of Commerce
- In office 13 August 2019 – 27 September 2022
- Minister: Jurin Laksanawisit

Personal details
- Born: Mallika Boonmeetrakool; 22 February 1973 (age 53) Chiang Muan, Chiang Rai (present-day Phayao), Thailand
- Party: Mahachon Party (2004–2007); Democrat Party (2007–2023); Independent (2026–present)
- Spouse: Nattapol Mahasuk (m. 2014)
- Parent(s): Boonmee Boonmeetrakool; Saisamorn Boonmeetrakool

Mallika Boonmeetrakool Mahasuk (Thai: มัลลิกา บุญมีตระกูล มหาสุข; born 22 February 1973) is a Thai politician and former journalist. She served as a party-list Member of the House of Representatives and was a deputy spokesperson and executive committee member for the Democrat Party.

== Early life and education ==
Mallika was born on 22 February 1973 in Chiang Muan, Chiang Rai (now Phayao), Thailand. She is of Tai Lue descent. She completed her secondary education at Phayao Pittayakhom School. She earned a Bachelor of Arts in Humanities from Ramkhamhaeng University, and both a Master's degree and a Ph.D. in Social Innovation from Rangsit University.

In her early years, she was a member of the Thailand national cycling team.

On 30 August 2014, Mallika married Nattapol Mahasuk in a royal-sponsored wedding ceremony presided over by Princess Maha Chakri Sirindhorn.

== Career ==
Mallika began her career in news media as a television host and news anchor for ITV. She left the network to enter politics, running as a candidate for the Mahachon Party in the 2005 general election, and later for the Democrat Party in the 2007 and 2011 elections for the Phayao constituency, though she was not elected.

Following the 2006 coup d'état, she was appointed to the National People's Assembly. She also served as an assistant secretary to various ministers, including Sukhumbhand Paribatra.

During her tenure as the Democrat Party's deputy spokesperson, Mallika campaigned actively against websites containing content deemed offensive to the Thai monarchy. She also hosted a political program on the Blue Sky Channel and served as a spokesperson on the protest stages during the People's Democratic Reform Committee (PDRC) demonstrations.

In the 2019 general election, she ran as the Democrat Party's 30th party-list candidate. Although she did not initially win a seat, she was appointed as an advisor to Minister of Commerce Jurin Laksanawisit. On 27 September 2022, following the resignation of Chaiyos Jiramethakorn, Mallika was elevated to the House of Representatives as a party-list MP, subsequently resigning from her advisory role.

She ran again in the 2023 general election as the 19th party-list candidate for the Democrat Party but was not elected, as the party secured only three party-list seats. She officially resigned from the Democrat Party on 21 September 2023. Following her resignation, she took a break from politics and worked as an online content creator and live streamer.

On 23 February 2026, Mallika announced her candidacy for the upcoming 2026 Bangkok gubernatorial election as an independent. She advocated the use of AI to help generate solutions and address problems facing Bangkok. In the election, she came in second with 304,494 votes, representing 13.45% of the total vote, a result that was widely regarded as exceeding expectations.

== Royal decorations ==
- 2025 – Knight Grand Cross (First Class) of the Order of the Crown of Thailand
- 2010 – Knight Commander (Second Class) of the Order of the White Elephant
