= Thammanoon Thien-ngern =

Thai politician (1913–1989)

- ธรรมนูญ เทียนเงิน
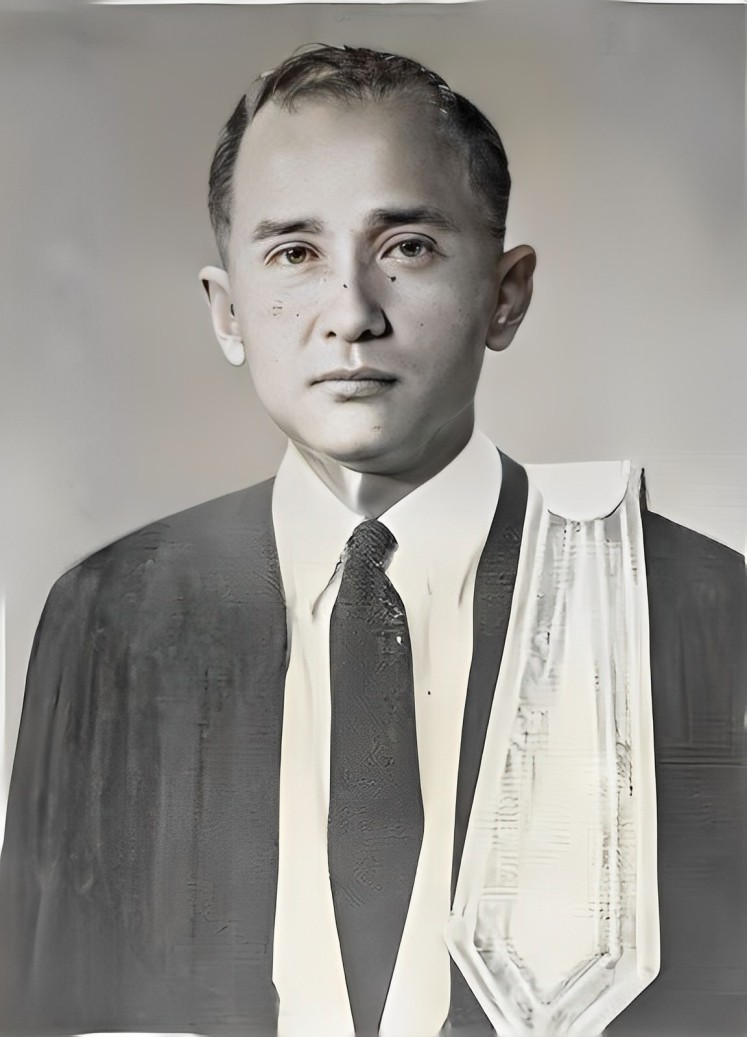
- Thammanoon before 1959

5th Governor of Bangkok
- In office 10 August 1975 – 29 April 1977
- Preceded by: Sai Hutacharoen
- Succeeded by: Chalor Thammasiri

Secretary-General of the Democrat party
- In office 26 September 1970 – 6 October 1975

Deputy Minister of the Interior
- In office 15 February – 13 March 1975
- Prime Minister: Seni Pramoj

Personal details
- Born: 28 June 1913 Phan Thong district, Chonburi province, Siam
- Died: February 6, 1989 (aged 75)
- Party: Democrat

Thammanoon Thien-ngern (Thai: ธรรมนูญ เทียนเงิน; 28 June 1913 – 6 February 1989) was a Thai politician who served as the 5th appointed and 1st elected governor of Bangkok from 1975 to 1977. His governorship, which was one year and 262 days, was the shortest time of any elected governor. He was the uncle of the 25th Prime-minister of Thailand, Samak Sundaravej.

== Early life and education ==
Thammanoon Thien-ngern was born on 28 June 1913 in Phan Thong district, Chonburi province, Siam and is of Chinese descent. Thammanoon completed his secondary education at Debsirin School in Bangkok in 1931. However, Thammanoon was arrested in 1932 and sent to Mae Hong Son province until he returned to Bangkok in 1937. When he was back in Bangkok, he attended Thammasat University and graduated in 1942.

== Political career ==
In the 1946 general election, Thammanoon was elected as a Member of Parliament to the House of Representatives for Chonburi province. He was later elected again as an MP for Chonburi province in 1957. Thammanoon moved to Phra Nakhon Si Ayutthaya where he was elected as an MP in 1969 for the Democrat party. He had only served for two years when in November 1971, Prime-minister Thanom Kittikachorn staged a coup against the government, closing the House of Representatives.

From 26 September 1970 to 6 October 1975, he served as the Secretary-General of the Democrat party. He was also the Deputy Minister of the Interior from 15 February to 13 March 1975.

== Governor of Bangkok ==
Originally, the Governor of Bangkok was appointed by the government like the provinces. However, the Bangkok Metropolitan Government Regulation Act B.E. 2518 (1975) promulgation on 20 February 1975 and made the governorship an electable role. The act also set forth the role and powers of the governor, and the process they were elected. The 1975 Bangkok gubernatorial election was held on 10 August 1975 and was contested by five candidates including Thammanoon of the Democrat party. However, the Democrat party originally planned to run Surat Osanukroh as its candidate. Surat's nomination was opposed by his nephew and head of the party's right-wing faction, Samak Sundaravej. He argued that this was an opportunity to save Thammanoon's reputation following the 1975 general election. Samak's opposition to Surat later caused Surat to withdrawal and the party to choose Thammanoon. The election only saw a 13.86% turnout, with Thammanoon winning with 99,247 votes.

Thammanoon would never serve the full 4-year term. Following the 6 October 1976 massacre, conflict began to rise between Thammanoon and Deputy Governor of Bangkok Mongkol Simaroj, who resigned in protest against Thammanoon. His resignation was followed by two other Deputy Governors. Conflicts between Thammanoon and the Bangkok Metropolitan Administration led to his removal by Prime-minister Thanin Kraivichien on 29 April 1977. The next governors were subsequently appointed until an election was held in 1985.
