= 2026 Bangkok gubernatorial election =

- 28 June 2026
- Registered: 4,428,644
- Turnout: 52.79% (▼7.94pp)
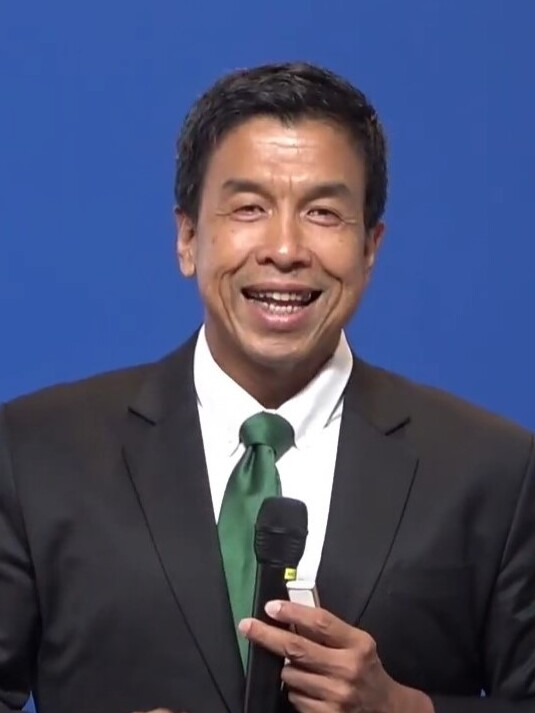

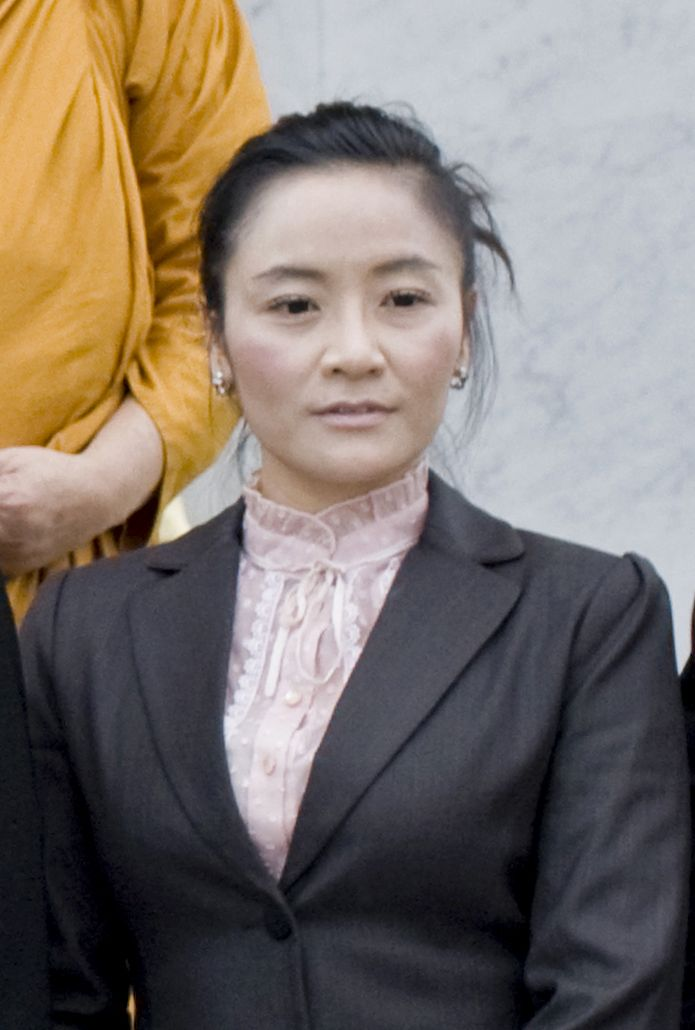

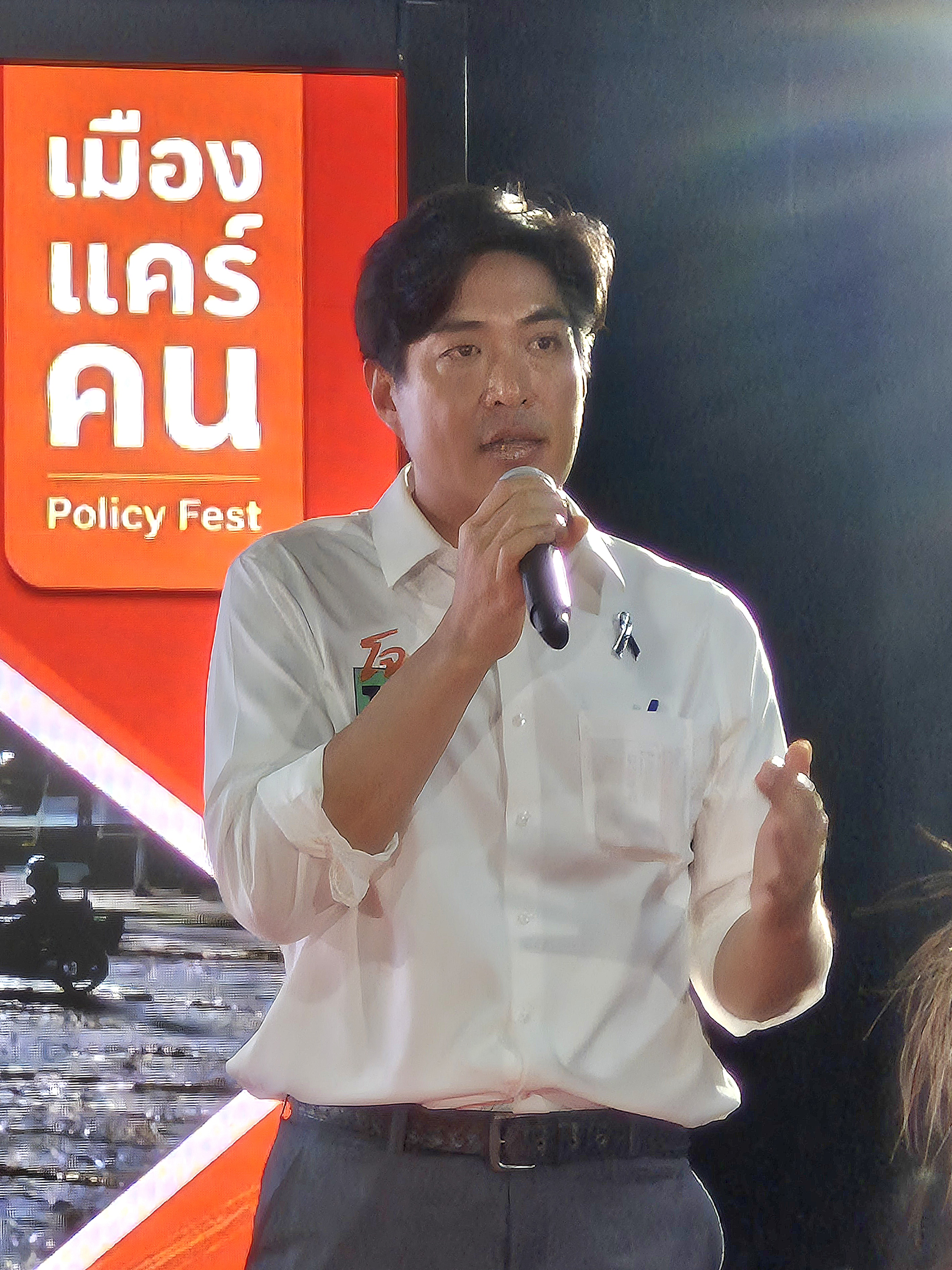
Candidate	Chadchart Sittipunt	Mallika Boonmeetrakool Mahasook	Chaiwat Sathawornwichit
Party	Independent	Friends of Mallika	People's
Popular vote	1,537,784	304,494	188,144
Percentage	66.40%	13.15%	8.12%
- Gubernatorial election results map. Green denotes districts won by Chadchart.
Governor before election
Chadchart Sittipunt
Independent
Elected Governor
Chadchart Sittipunt
Independent

The 2026 Bangkok gubernatorial election was held on 28 June 2026. It was the twelfth election for the governorship of Bangkok. The election was held concurrently with the 2026 Bangkok Metropolitan Council election and local elections in Pattaya.

The election followed the resignation of Chadchart Sittipunt, who was elected as an independent candidate in the 2022 Bangkok gubernatorial election. Chadchart resigned on 18 May 2026 and sought a second term. The People's Party, which won all 33 Bangkok constituency seats in the 2026 Thai general election, nominated Chaiwat Sathawornwichit as its candidate. The election resulted in a landslide victory by Chadchart, surpassing his own record in the 2022 election.

== Background ==
Chadchart Sittipunt took office in 2022 after winning more than 1.3 million votes as an independent candidate. His four-year term was originally due to end in May 2026. On 10 April 2026, the Election Commission of Thailand set 28 June 2026 as the polling date for the Bangkok gubernatorial election, the Bangkok Metropolitan Council election and the Pattaya local elections.

The election took place a few months after the 2026 Thai general election, in which the Bhumjaithai Party won the largest number of seats and later formed a coalition government with the Pheu Thai Party. In Bangkok, the People's Party won all 33 constituency seats, giving the party a strong parliamentary base in the capital ahead of the gubernatorial election.

The People's Party nominated Chaiwat Sathawornwichit, while the Democrat Party nominated Anucha Burapachaisri. Bhumjaithai and Pheu Thai did not field gubernatorial candidates.

== Candidates ==
Candidate registration was held from 28 May to 1 June 2026. At the close of registration, the Bangkok Metropolitan Administration reported 18 candidates for governor and 258 candidates for the 50 seats of the Bangkok Metropolitan Council.

Number	Candidate		Notes
1	Independent	M.L. Kornkasiwat Kasemsri	Deputy leader of the Palang Pracharath Party
2	Independent	Samai Lalerd	
3	Independent	Pongsak Puapornpong	
4	Independent	Prateep Watcharachokkasem	Member of the Bangkok Metropolitan Council (1985–1989)
5	Democrat Party	Anucha Burapachaisri	MP (2023–2025); Spokesperson for the Prime Minister's Office (2020–2023)
6	Independent	Pisan Kittiyaowaman	
7	Bangkok Can Fly Group	Pasapong Chaiviriyavanich	
8	Bangkok Leaders Group	Veerapoj Lueprasitsakul	Deputy leader of the Sang Chart Party
9	Independent	Chadchart Sittipunt	Governor of Bangkok (2022–2026); Minister of Transport (2012–2014)
10	People's Party	Chaiwat Sathawornwichit	MP (2023–2026); Deputy leader of the People's Party
11	Independent	Prayoon Kongyot	Deputy director of the Bangkok Fire and Rescue Department
12	Economic Party	Chanthep Sesawech	Police lieutenant general Secretary-general of the Thai Pakdee Party (2022–2023)
13	Independent	Komsan Panwichatikul	Member of the Bangkok Metropolitan Council (2010–2014)
14	Friends of Mallika Group	Mallika Boonmeetrakool Mahasook	MP (2022–2023)
15	Bangkok Smile Group	Olan Tangtratrakul	
16	Independent	Srirat Changphet	
17	Independent	Lallana Mongkolhatsadin	
18	Independent	Somchai Charoenworakiat	

== Campaign ==
On 28 May 2026, Chadchart launched his campaign platform at Stadium One, presenting more than 250 policies under the slogan "a city of opportunity and hope for everyone". His campaign grouped its proposals into four broad areas: quality of life, livability, economic opportunity and administrative efficiency.

Chaiwat campaigned on the People's Party platform of making Bangkok easier to live in, with proposals covering family welfare, small businesses, transport links and public services. The party also announced that it would not install gubernatorial campaign posters on roads or utility poles, citing safety, waste and obstruction concerns, while continuing to use posters for its council candidates within legal limits.

Anucha launched his campaign for the Democrat Party with proposals focused on transport, cleanliness, living standards, incomes and transparency in city administration. Mallika campaigned on the use of artificial intelligence in city administration and proposed reviving district councils in Bangkok.

== Endorsements and campaign support ==
Chadchart Sittipunt
- Chakkapan Phewngam, Deputy Governor of Bangkok (2022–2026)
- Sanon Wangsrangboon, Deputy Governor of Bangkok (2022–2026)
- Tavida Kamolvej, Deputy Governor of Bangkok (2022–2026)
- Wisanu Subsompon, Deputy Governor of Bangkok (2022–2026)
Chaiwat Sathawornwichit
- Bhichit Rattakul, Governor of Bangkok (1996–2000)
- Natthaphong Ruengpanyawut, Leader of the Opposition (2024–2025, 2026–present), Leader of the People's Party and MP (2019–present)
- Sirikanya Tansakun, deputy leader of the People's Party and MP (2019–present)
- Rukchanok Srinork, MP (2023–present)
- Wiroj Lakkhanaadisorn, MP (2019–2023) and 2022 Bangkok gubernatorial candidate
- Suraphol Nitikraipot, rector of Thammasat University (2004–2010)
Anucha Burapachaisri
- Abhisit Vejjajiva, Prime Minister (2008–2011)
- Apirak Kosayodhin, Governor of Bangkok (2004–2008)
- Anchalee Paireerak, journalist and activist
Chanthep Sesawech
- Chris Potranandana, chairperson of the Economic Party and MP (2026–present)
Pasapong Chaiviriyavanich
- Mongkolkit Suksintharanon, MP (2019–2023)
Kornkasiwat Kasemsri
- Thirachai Phuvanatnaranubala, Minister of Finance (2011–2012)
- Sondhi Limthongkul, media proprietor and activist

== Opinion polls ==
Fieldwork date	Polling firm	Sample size	Chadchart	Chaiwat	Mallika	Anucha	Kornkasiwat	Chanthep	Komsan	Others	Undecided	Lead
16–19 June	Suan Dusit	2,562	61.09%	10.93%	9.84%	4.64%	1.56%	—	—	2.96%	8.98%	50.16%
15–17 June	NIDA	2,000	72.35%	8.80%	9.60%	3.10%	1.35%	—	—	2.10%	2.70%	62.75%
9–12 June	Suan Dusit	2,029	60.08%	13.17%	7.39%	3.89%	1.09%	—	1.28%	1.03%	12.07%	46.91%
5–7 June	NBU	2,391	69.10%	3.60%	10.00%	4.00%	1.10%	1.40%	—	—	—	59.10%
4–7 June	KPI	1,600	43.50%	12.00%	6.90%	6.10%	3.90%	—	—	13.90%	13.70%	31.50%
2–4 June	NIDA	2,000	67.30%	8.20%	7.30%	3.10%	1.55%	—	—	2.35%	10.20%	59.10%
25–29 May	IFD	2,237	35.99%	13.77%	6.84%	8.49%	3.44%	4.07%	2.86%	2.19%	20.16%	22.22%
22–25 May	KPI	1,600	31.50%	13.10%	7.50%	4.90%	6.20%	6.60%	6.10%	—	24.10%	18.40%
21–23 May	NBU	2,297	69.00%	8.10%	4.60%	—	—	1.40%	—	2.90%	—	60.90%
19–22 May	Suan Dusit	1,179	57.68%	17.90%	2.70%	1.87%	1.53%	—	4.75%	—	13.57%	39.78%
6–8 May	Suan Dusit	1,074	56.70%	18.90%	5.78%	—	1.30%	—	3.07%	1.12%	13.13%	37.80%

== Results ==
Candidate	Party	Votes	%
Chadchart Sittipunt	Independent	1,537,784	66.40
Mallika Boonmeetrakool Mahasook	Friends of Mallika Group	304,494	13.15
Chaiwat Sathawornwichit	People's Party	188,144	8.12
Anucha Burapachaisri	Democrat Party	106,739	4.61
M.L. Kornkasiwat Kasemsri	Independent	47,728	2.06
Samai Lalerd	Independent	19,695	0.85
Prateep Watcharachokkasem	Independent	14,722	0.64
Pongsak Puapornpong	Independent	12,295	0.53
Chanthep Sesawech	Economic Party	8,079	0.35
Pisan Kittiyaowaman	Independent	4,412	0.19
Veerapoj Lueprasitsakul	Bangkok Leaders Group	4,232	0.18
Komsan Panwichatikul	Independent	3,689	0.16
Pasapong Chaiviriyavanich	Bangkok Can Fly Group	3,641	0.16
Prayoon Kongyot	Independent	2,223	0.10
Olan Tangtratrakul	Bangkok Smile Group	1,846	0.08
Srirat Changphet	Independent	1,617	0.07
Somchai Charoenworakiat	Independent	1,298	0.06
Lallana Mongkolhatsadin	Independent	970	0.04
None of the above		52,470	2.27
Total		2,316,078	100.00
Valid votes		2,316,078	99.06
Invalid/blank votes		22,020	0.94
Total votes		2,338,098	100.00
Registered voters/turnout		4,428,644	52.79

== See also ==
- 2026 Bangkok Metropolitan Council election
- Governor of Bangkok
