= Siam City Bank =

Former Thai bank

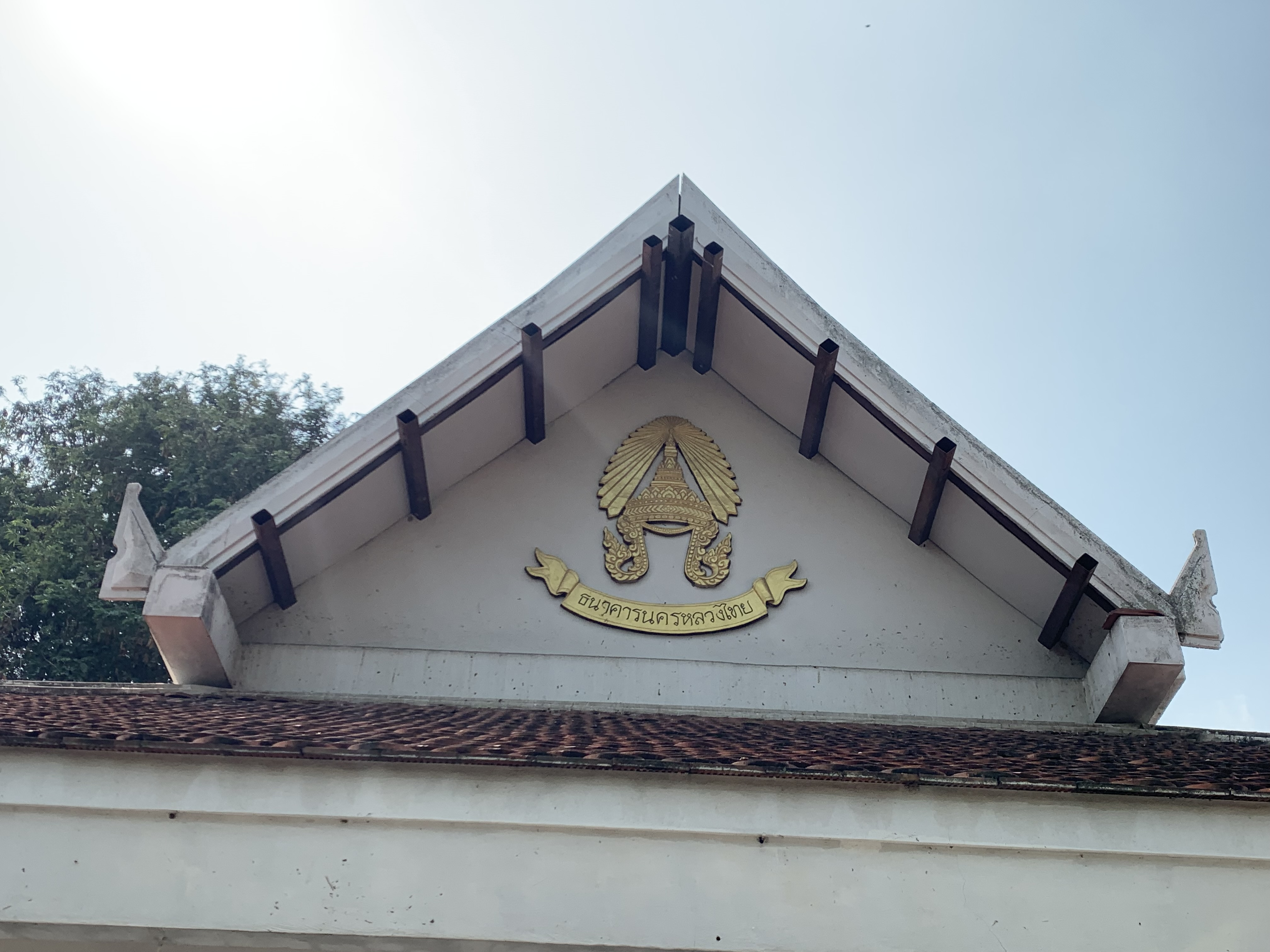
building in Wat Nakhon Luang decorated with the logo of Siam City Bank (Nakhon Luang Thai Bank)

Siam City Bank (Thai: ธนาคารนครหลวงไทย, RTGS: Thanakhan Nakhon Luang Thai) was a Thai bank that operated from 1941 to 2010. The bank was founded by the Nirandorn family, but changed hands many times, and by the 1990s its largest shareholders were the Srifuengfung and Mahadamrongkul families. The bank suffered badly from the 1997 Asian financial crisis, prompting the Bank of Thailand to intervene. The bank was bailed out and taken over by the state-owned Financial Institutions Development Fund (FIDF). It underwent a merger with the Bangkok Metropolitan Bank in 2002. In 2010, the FIDF sold its controlling stake in the bank to Thanachart Bank (then owned by the Bank of Nova Scotia), into which it was merged.
