= Santi Asoke =

Thai Theravada Buddhist sect (1975-)

The Santi Asoke (Thai: สันติอโศก "Peaceful Ashoka") is an ascetic sect of Theravada Buddhism established by former television entertainer and songwriter Phra Bodhirak. Bodhirak declared independence from mainstream Thai Buddhism in 1975. He had originally ordained within a monastery recognized by the sangha, but left to form a new sect which aimed to reform the Thai Forest Tradition. Santi Asoke members are strict vegetarians and live an ascetic life. They desire to help people attain "peace without suffering" and lead society back to the basics of Buddhism, devoid of superstition. They also take part in social welfare activities, including offering free meals to the poor.

The Santi Asoke has been described as "a radical sectarian movement" that "reflects the forest tradition's ideals of simplicity" and focuses on lay practice and political and religious reform.

== History ==
Phra Bodhirak was born Mongkhon Rakphong in 1934 in northeastern Thailand. He was a popular television entertainer who turned to Buddhism at age 36. In 1970, he was ordained as a Buddhist bhikkhu (monk) within the Dhammayuttika Nikaya tradition, and took the monastic name Bodhirak. He was a strict vegetarian and denounced other monks for eating meat and smoking.

Bodhirak developed a large following in and around Bangkok, founding Dan Ashoka (lit. 'Ashoka's Land') 30 miles from the city. As a result of his unorthodox activities, Bodhirak was forced to leave the Dhammayuttika community, instead joining the Maha Nikaya at Wat Nong Krathum (วัดหนองกระทุ่ม), Nakhon Pathom Province in 1973. After he was expelled by this group, too, he and his followers declared their secession from the mainstream Thai sangha.

Bodhirak subsequently established four monasteries: (1) Santi Asoke Monastery at Khet Bang Kapi, Bangkok; (2) Si Asok Monastery at Kantharalak District, Sisaket Province; (3) Sali Asok Monastery at Phaisali District, Nakhon Sawan Province; and (4) Phathomma Asok Monastery at Mueang Nakhon Pathom District, Nakhon Pathom Province. The monasteries consist of temples, pavilions and parsonages as on a par with wats.

In 1989, after Bodhirak declared himself a partially enlightened person (Pali: Sakadagami; lit. 'once-returner'), he was formally excommunicated from the mainstream Thai sangha.

== Practices ==
Bodhirak established Santi Asoke as a revival of the forest monk tradition. The movement advocates a strict vegetarian diet, consuming only one meal a day, and abstaining from alcohol and sex.

The Santi Asoke movement also rejects the magic and superstition of Thai Buddhism. Bodhirak has been highly critical of monks within the sangha and took his teachings to lay Buddhists where he denounced other monks at monasteries for eating meat, consuming cigarettes and engaging in supernatural rituals. He denied membership to the mainstream sangha upon establishing his own centre in Nakhon Pathom.

According to British scholar Peter Harvey, Santi Asoke is organised along "egalitarian" and "democratic" lines. It runs a number of social projects, including second-hand stores, farmers markets, and a restaurant providing free meals.

== See also ==
- People's Alliance for Democracy
- Palang Dharma Party
