= Chamnan Yaovabun =

Thai politician and diplomat (1914–2015)

Chamnan Yaovabun ThCh MPCh MWM
- ชำนาญ ยุวบูรณ์ (Thai)
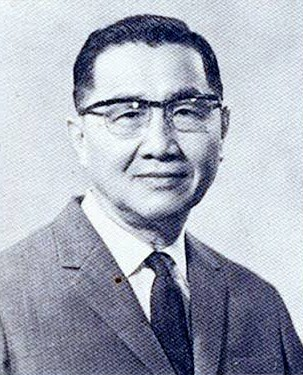

1st Governor of Bangkok
- In office 1 January 1973 – 22 October 1973
- Preceded by: Position established
- Succeeded by: At Visutyothaphiban

Personal details
- Born: Chamnan Yaovabun; 20 October 1914 Ang Thong , Siam
- Died: 7 January 2015 (aged 100) Bangkok, Thailand

Chamnan Yaovabun (Thai: ชำนาญ ยุวบูรณ์; 20 October 1914 – 1 July 2015) was a Thai politician and diplomat.

== Life and career ==
Yaovabun was born 20 October 1914 in Ang Thong Province. He was the first person to earn a political science doctorate from Chulalongkorn University.

From 30 December 1968 – 31 December 1972, he served as the Thai Ambassador to Argentina. From 14 May 1970 to 31 December 1972, he served as the Thai Ambassador to Chile. From May 27, 1970 –December 31, 1972, he served as the ambassador of Thailand to Bolivia, and from May 27, 1970 –December 31, 1972, he served as the Thai ambassador to Paraguay, all positions during that period held residency in Buenos Aires.

He was the Inaugural Governor of Bangkok, being appointed on 1 January 1973 and holding the position for 294 days until 22 October 1973.

He was awarded a number of insignia, including the Insignia of the Order of the Crown 2nd Floor, Tutiyajun Jomklao.

He died in Bangkok on 1 July 2015, aged 100.

== Royal decorations ==
=== Thailand ===
- 1967 − Knight Grand Cordon of the Most Exalted Order of the White Elephant
- 1966 − Knight Grand Cordon of the Most Noble Order of the Crown of Thailand
- 1965 − Knight Commander of the Most Illustrious Order of Chula Chom Klao
- 1970 − Freemen Safeguarding Medal (Second Class, Second Category)
- 1958 − Border Service Medal
- 1959 − Chakrabarti Mala Medal
- 1967 − Boy Scout Citation Medal of Vajira, First Class
- 1956 − King Bhumibol Adulyadej's Royal Cypher Medal, Third Class
- 1968 − King Bhumibol Adulyadej's Court Medal, Gold Class
- 1950 − King Rama IX Coronation Medal
- 1981 − Red Cross Medal of Appreciation, First Class

=== Foreign honours ===
- Grand Cross of the Order of the Liberator General San Martín
- Grand Cross of the Order of Sikatuna
- Grand Decoration of Honour in Silver of the Decoration of Honour for Services to the Republic of Austria with Sash
- Order of Service Merit, 1st Class
- Grand Officer of the Order of Orange-Nassau
- Grand Officer of the Order of the Million Elephants and the White Parasol
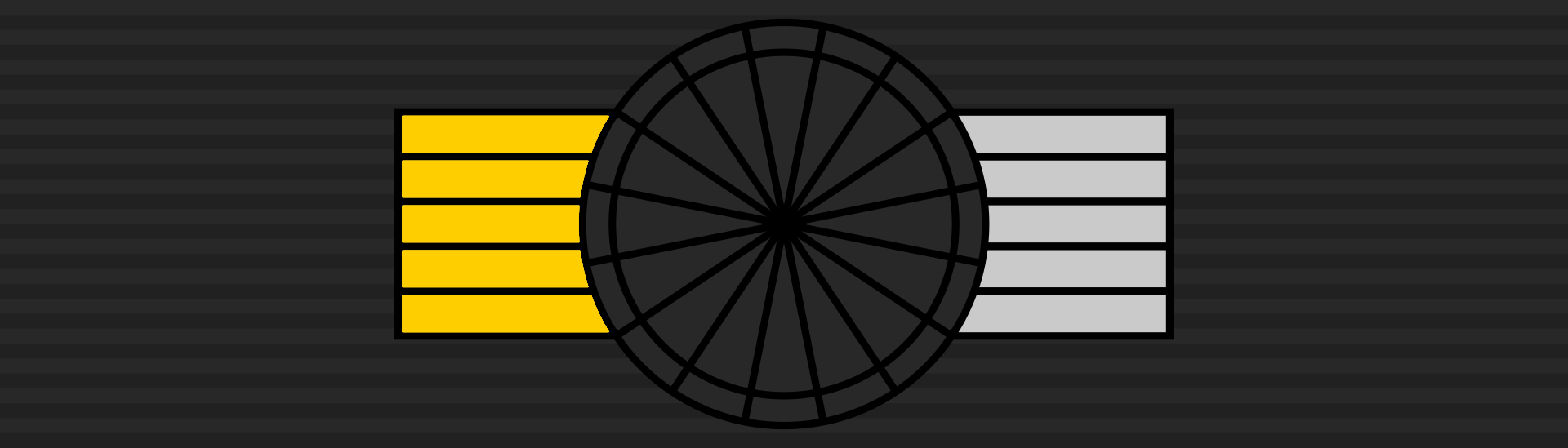
- Grand Officer of the Order of the Polar Star
- Grand Commander of the Order of George I
- Knight Commander of the Order of Merit of the Federal Republic of Germany
- Commander of the Order of St. Olav with Star
- Commander of the Order of the Dannebrog
- Order of Brilliant Star, 3rd Class
- Companion of the Order of the Defender of the Realm
