= Chana Rungsaeng =

Thai politician (1931–2026)

- ชนะ รุ่งแสง

Member of the House of Representatives of Thailand
- In office 12 January 1976 – 6 October 1976

Personal details
- Born: 14 September 1931 Phra Khanong district, Siam
- Died: 5 April 2026 (aged 94) Bangkok, Thailand
- Party: Democrat
- Occupation: Businessman

Chana Rungsaeng (Thai: ชนะ รุ่งแสง; 15 September 1931 – 5 April 2026) was a Thai politician. A member of the Democrat Party, he served in the House of Representatives from January to October 1976.

Rungsaeng died in Bangkok on 5 April 2026, at the age of 94.
