= Governor of Bangkok =

Head of government of Bangkok

- ผู้ว่าราชการกรุงเทพมหานคร
- Seal of the Bangkok Metropolitan Administration

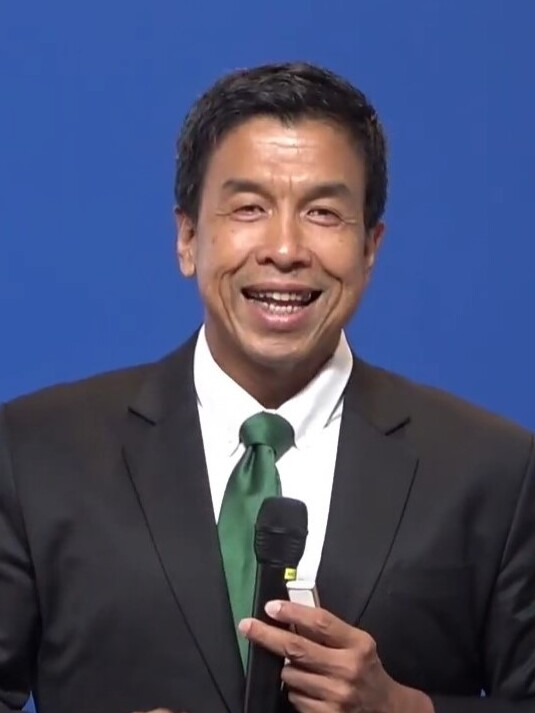
- Incumbent; Chadchart Sittipunt since 22 May 2022
- Bangkok Metropolitan Administration
- Style: Governor (informal); The Honourable (formal); His Excellency (diplomatic)
- Type: Head of government
- Reports to: Minister of Interior
- Seat: Bangkok City Hall
- Appointer: Direct election (Note: Since 1975, sometimes are appointed by the Ministry of Interior or the military junta.)
- Term length: Four years, renewable once consecutively
- Constituting instrument: Bangkok Metropolitan Administration Act
- Formation: 1 January 1973; 53 years ago
- First holder: Chamnan Yaovabun
- Deputy: Deputy Governor of Bangkok
- Salary: ฿113,560 per month ($3,399 USD)
- Website: www.bangkok.go.th

The governor of Bangkok (Thai: ผู้ว่าราชการกรุงเทพมหานคร, RTGS: phu wa ratchakan krung thep maha nakhon) is the head of the local government of Bangkok. The governor is also the chief executive of the Bangkok Metropolitan Administration (BMA). The governor is elected to a renewable term of four years, currently it is one of the two directly elected executive offices in the kingdom. The office is comparable to that of a city mayor.

From 2016 to 2022 Pol Gen Aswin Kwanmuang acted as Governor of Bangkok. He was appointed by Prime Minister Prayut Chan-o-cha using Section 44 of the interim charter to replace Sukhumbhand Paribatra. The reason given for his ouster was "...because he was involved in many legal cases."

The current incumbent is Chadchart Sittipunt. He was elected in a landslide victory in the 2022 Bangkok gubernatorial election, receiving 52.65 % (1.38 Million) of all votes cast, marking a new record-high, and winning in all 50 districts of Bangkok.

== Powers and roles ==
The powers and role of the office of Governor of Bangkok in accordance with the Bangkok Metropolitan Administration Act, BE 2528 (1985) (Thai: พระราชบัญญัติระเบียบบริหารราชการกรุงเทพมหานคร พ.ศ. 2528) are as follows:

- Formulate and implement policies for the Bangkok Metropolitan Area.
- Head the Bangkok Metropolitan Administration.
- Appoint and remove deputy governors, advisors, board members, city officials, and public servants.
- Coordinate and carry out the orders of the Cabinet of Thailand, the Prime Minister of Thailand, and the Ministry of Interior.
- Oversee the smooth running of the various agencies and services of the city.
- The governor is also invested with the same powers as any other governor of a province of Thailand and any other mayor.
- The power to draw up legislation and bills for the city, to be considered in the Bangkok Metropolitan Council.

== History ==
Since 1973, the city was administered by a single executive appointed by the cabinet from city civil servants. However soon, it was determined that the executive office should a popularly elected office instead. The passage of the Bangkok Metropolis Administrative Organisation Act, BE 2518 (1975) (Thai: พระราชบัญญัติระเบียบบริหารราชการกรุงเทพมหานคร พ.ศ. 2518), created the Bangkok Metropolis to replace Bangkok Province and created an elected governor with a four-year term.

The first election for the office was held on the 10 August 1975. Thammanoon Thien-ngern was elected as the first Governor of Bangkok. Conflicts between the governor and the Bangkok Metropolitan Council, however, became so fierce that Thanin Kraivichien, the Prime Minister of Thailand removed him and reinstated the appointment system. Elections resumed with the passing of the Bangkok Metropolitan Administration Act, BE 2528 (1985). Elections were held on 14 November 1985.

== List of governors ==
| No. | Portrait | Name (Birth–Death) | Term of office | | | Party | Election |
| No. | Portrait | Name (Birth–Death) | Took office | Left office | Time in office | Party | Election |
|---|---|---|---|---|---|---|---|
| 1 | | Chamnan Yaovabun ชำนาญ ยุวบูรณ์ (1914–2015) | 1 January 1973 | 22 October 1973 | 294 days | Independent | Appointed |
| 2 | | At Visutyothaphiban อรรถ วิสูตรโยธาภิบาล (1915–2004) | 1 November 1973 | 4 June 1974 | 215 days | Independent | Appointed |
| 3 | | Siri Santabutra ศิริ สันติบุตร (1912–2001) | 5 June 1974 | 9 March 1975 | 278 days | Independent | Appointed |
| 4 | | Sai Hutachareon สาย หุตะเจริญ | 5 May 1975 | 9 August 1975 | 96 days | Independent | Appointed |
| 5 | | Thammanoon Thien-ngern ธรรมนูญ เทียนเงิน (1913–1989) | 10 August 1975 | 29 April 1977 | 1 year, 253 days | Democrat | 1975 |
| 6 | | Chalor Thammasiri ชลอ ธรรมศิริ (1927–2021) | 29 April 1977 | 14 May 1979 | 2 years, 15 days | Independent | Appointed |
| 7 | | Chaowat Sudlapa เชาวน์วัศ สุดลาภา (1933–2001) | 4 July 1979 | 16 April 1981 | 1 year, 286 days | Independent | Appointed |
| 8 | | Thiem Mokaranont เทียม มกรานนท์ | 28 April 1981 | 1 November 1984 | 3 years, 187 days | Independent | Appointed |
| 9 | | Asa Meksavan อาษา เมฆสวรรค์ (1925–2025) | 6 November 1984 | 13 November 1985 | 1 year, 8 days | Independent | Appointed |
| 10 | | Chamlong Srimuang จำลอง ศรีเมือง (born 1935) | 14 November 1985 | 22 January 1992 | 6 years, 69 days | Independent (Note: On behalf of the Ruam Palang Group in 1985 election.) (until 1988) | 1985 |
| 10 | | Chamlong Srimuang จำลอง ศรีเมือง (born 1935) | 14 November 1985 | 22 January 1992 | 6 years, 69 days | Palang Dharma (from 1988) | 1990 |
| 11 | | Krisda Arunvongse na Ayudhya กฤษฎา อรุณวงษ์ ณ อยุธยา (1932–2010) | 19 April 1992 | 18 April 1996 | 3 years, 365 days | Palang Dharma | 1992 |
| 12 | | Bhichit Rattakul พิจิตต รัตตกุล (born 1946) | 2 June 1996 | 11 May 2000 | 3 years, 344 days | Independent (Note: On behalf of the Mot Ngan Group.) | 1996 |
| 13 | | Samak Sundaravej สมัคร สุนทรเวช (1935–2009) | 23 July 2000 | 6 July 2004 | 3 years, 319 days | Thai Citizen (until 2001) | 2000 |
| 13 | | Samak Sundaravej สมัคร สุนทรเวช (1935–2009) | 23 July 2000 | 6 July 2004 | 3 years, 319 days | Independent (from 2001) | 2000 |
| 14 | | Apirak Kosayodhin อภิรักษ์ โกษะโยธิน (born 1961) | 29 August 2004 | 19 November 2008 | 4 years, 82 days | Democrat | 2004 |
| 14 | | Apirak Kosayodhin อภิรักษ์ โกษะโยธิน (born 1961) | 29 August 2004 | 19 November 2008 | 4 years, 82 days | Democrat | 2008 |
| 15 | | Mom Rajawongse; Sukhumbhand Paribatra หม่อมราชวงศ์สุขุมพันธุ์ บริพัตร (born 1952) | 11 January 2009 | 18 October 2016 | 7 years, 281 days | Democrat | 2009 |
| 15 | | Mom Rajawongse; Sukhumbhand Paribatra หม่อมราชวงศ์สุขุมพันธุ์ บริพัตร (born 1952) | 11 January 2009 | 18 October 2016 | 7 years, 281 days | Democrat | 2013 |
| 16 | | Aswin Kwanmuang อัศวิน ขวัญเมือง (born 1951) | 18 October 2016 | 24 March 2022 | 5 years, 157 days | Independent | Appointed by NCPO |
| 17 | | Chadchart Sittipunt ชัชชาติ สิทธิพันธุ์ (born 1966) | 22 May 2022 | Incumbent | 4 years, 138 days | Independent | 2022 |
| 17 | | Chadchart Sittipunt ชัชชาติ สิทธิพันธุ์ (born 1966) | 22 May 2022 | Incumbent | 4 years, 138 days | Independent | 2026 |

- Unless otherwise indicated, they were elected.
