= Palang Dharma Party =

Palang Dharma Party พรรคพลังธรรม Power of Dharma Party
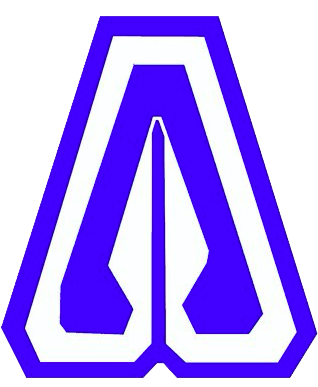
- Leader: Chamlong Srimuang (1988–1992); Thaksin Shinawatra (1995–1996)
- Founded: 9 June 1988
- Dissolved: 19 October 2007
- Succeeded by: New Palangdharma Party
- Ideology: Political Buddhism; Anti-corruption; Reformism; Green politics
- Political position: Centre to centre-left

Website
- www.palangdharma.org (archived)

The Palang Dharma Party (Thai: พรรคพลังธรรม, RTGS: Phak Phalang Tham; translated as "power of Dharma", or "moral force", PDP for short) was a Buddhist-inspired political party in Thailand founded by Chamlong Srimuang in 1988, associated with the Santi Asoke sect of Buddhism. The Thai word tham can be used to refer both to "morality", and "dharma", the teachings of Buddhism. Phak Phalang Tham was a political party, not to be confused with its precursor, Ruam Phalang ("collective force"), the campaign group that backed Chamlong Srimuang in the 1985 Bangkok gubernatorial election. To some extent, the PDP evolved into a political party from Ruam Phalang. The latter group was largely made up of Santi Asoke devotees, former Young Turks, and other political activists and community leaders. Many of the PDP's early members were drawn from the ranks of Ruam Phalang.

== Foundation and overview ==
The Palang Dharma Party was founded by Chamlong Srimuang in May 1988. A retired major general and former governor of Bangkok, Chamlong was a devout Buddhist with strong ties to the Santi Asoke sect; he is known for his current vows of chastity, his vegetarianism and his strict adherence to the Eight Precepts of Buddhism. Although Chamlong won the 1985 election for Bangkok governor as an independent backed by Ruam Phalang, in the following years Chamlong's political future seemed to be increasingly compromised by his lack of backing by a formal political party. Ahead of the 1988 general election, he founded the Palang Dharma Party, although only after gaining the approval of an initially reluctant Phra Photirak, the founder and leader of the Santi Asoke Buddhist sect. As the election day approached, Santi Asoke members, including Photirak, provided out massive support for the new political party.

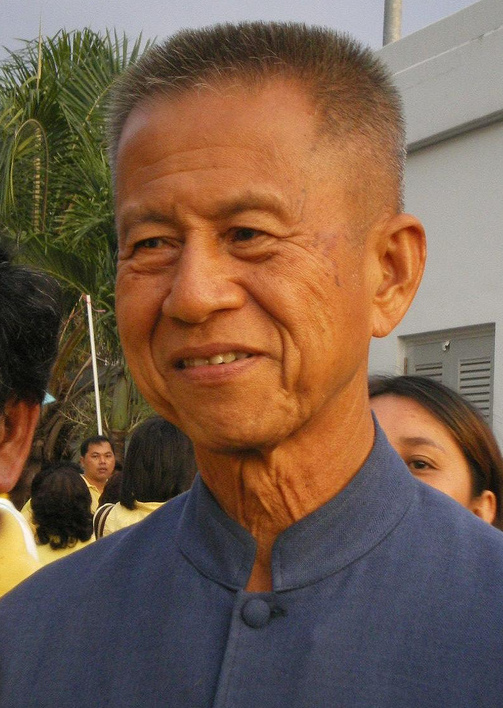
Chamlong Srimuang, party founder, leader 1988–1992

Chamlong founded the party in an attempt to "purify" Thai politics, as rampant corruption was often used to justify military coups d'état. With the Palang Dharma Party, a new type of politics was introduced to Thailand. The party's program was based on Buddhist principles. However the popularity of its leader contributed more to the party's success than its political platform. Palang Dharma was particularly popular with the urban middle-class in the Bangkok region. There it won 49 out of 55 seats in the 1990 elections for the Bangkok City Council and 32 out of 35 seats in the 1992 parliamentary election. Palang Dharma became a major force in Thai politics during the early-1990s. Its leader Chamlong was a key figure in the 1992 middle class protests against the military rule of Prime Minister Suchinda Kraprayoon, commonly known as the Black May, that led to the resignation of Suchinda.

== Platform policy and principles ==
In June 1988, the Palang Dharma Party released a brief "platform policy" document, submitted to the Interior Ministry as part of the required party registration procedures. The majority of the party's policies, presented under five headings in eighteen numbered points, were relatively general in nature; they included "improving the quality of the bureaucracy, fighting corruption, decentralizing power, spreading wealth to the countryside, supporting increased employment, and creating a better military".

According to Southeast Asian politics specialist Duncan McCargo, there were definite advantages to the "vagueness" of this document. Firstly, the policy program revealed nothing about the wide range of conflicting views that existed within the political party, even upon its founding; that is, certain members' preferences for European-style democratic elements, the "village socialism" favored by Santi Asoke devotees, or the "ethical capitalism" supported by the more successful business-minded members. Furthermore, the lack of clearly delineated and specific policy promises in the Palang Dharma's publications gave elected party members the freedom to make policies as they saw fit down the road.

More significant than the Palang Dharma Party's policies themselves, however, was its Buddhist-inspired ideology of "virtuous politics". The Palang Dharma Pledge, which could be found in Palang Dharma's policy booklet, outlined four objectives: to act only "in accordance with morality", to refrain from vote-buying, not to lie, and not to aspire to political office. According to Chamlong, the purpose of the party was not to serve its members' personal desires to further their political careers, but rather to set an example "which might inspire the formation of other parties with similar principles, leading to a radical change in Thai political culture". Specifically, in terms of social policies, Palang Dharma hoped to encourage people "to lead clean, diligent, frugal, honest, and self-sacrificing daily lives".

In the end, however, beyond the seemingly unifying umbrella cause of "morality" and anti-corruption taken up by the Palang Dharma Party, what ultimately appears to have held the party together, at least for a time, was the tenuous leadership and popularity of Chamlong himself.

== Factions ==
Throughout its existence, the party suffered from the division between the Santi Asoke members like Chamlong who intransigently insisted on their principles and rejected compromise (the so-called "temple" faction), and its pragmatic faction of secular politicians who wanted to advance their careers and the party's influence. The "temple faction", or "believers", fundamentally rejected the role of money in Thai politics, but advocated self-sacrifice, hard work, sincerity and morality, even if this should mean to confine the role of the party to one of a minor, uninfluential, oppositional party. The secular faction, or "careerists", on the other hand were convinced that, in order to lead the country's development in the right direction, the party had to expand, to invite capable professionals and business people, to forge alliances and to join the government. The "temple faction" deemed the pragmatists to be opportunistic and suspected them of capitalising on the good reputation of the party and its founder. The "careerists" again considered the "believers" naive, out of touch with reality and unelectable if standing alone.

Party leader Chamlong was able to use this factionalism to his benefit. He played off the factions against each other to defend and stabilize his own top position. He presented convincing, reasonable professionals as the party's figureheads, while the "temple faction" embodied the party's conscience and sought to tame some representatives' ambitions. Chamlong impinged upon the party's leadership elections, and threatened to resign when he felt his authority challenged.

== Role of Santi Asoke in the 1988 General Election ==
The July 1988 general election marked the first time members of the Palang Dharma Party would run for elective office since the party's creation only two months prior. Although hesitant at first to endorse the creation of the Palang Dharma Party publicly, as the election approached, Santi Asoke members, including the Buddhist sect's founder, Phra Phothirak, showed their support for the party in a number of ways. For one, in order be recognized as an official party, the PDP was obligated to meet the Interior Ministry's party registration standards, including presenting evidence of having reached the legally required minimum of five thousand members belonging to various parts of the country. Such a requirement would have proven difficult, had it not been for the remarkable breadth of Santi Asoke's network of adherents; the required number of signatures was quickly acquired within days, ultimately totaling 10,310 names at the time of submission.

In addition, the Palang Dharma Party chose to vie for over 300 parliamentary seats, a greater number than any other party at the time. Close to half of the PDP candidates selected to run were Santi Asoke followers. Unlike those who belonged to Ruam Phalang in 1985, the newly created PDP's members in 1988 were not simply campaigning on behalf of Chamlong; that is, a single charismatic personality. Rather, they themselves were candidates in the running. Chamlong had won the public over in the 1985 Bangkok gubernatorial election with his memorable and impressive ascetic Buddhist lifestyle, convincing voters of his sincerity, integrity, and modesty. Constituents admired the ethics of the former major general who, as a successful individual and well-known public figure, had given up his worldly possessions in order to live in a way that won over the urban poor. In comparison, these new Palang Dharma candidates who presented themselves in "peasant garb", promoted chastity and vegetarianism, and denounced materialistic temptations were initially perceived by some of the electorate as "oddities, people out of sympathy with ordinary needs and popular opinion" who had left behind "normal" Thai society in their moral quest for purity. In addition, the fact that Chamlong himself refrained from running for a seat in the 1988 election did nothing to improve the public's early impressions of the fledgling political party. Lastly, prior to the election, a number of prominent "moral" figures, including Police Colonel Seri Temiyavej, withdrew their potential candidacies, further weakening the PDP's party base.

Nevertheless, Chamlong's popularity and the large number of candidates put forth by the Palang Dharma Party appeared to endanger the positions of already-established political parties in the Thai Parliament. For the Prachakorn Thai Party leader Samak Sundaravej in particular, the rise of the PDP posed a direct threat to Samak's prime ministerial aspirations. Thus as part of their election strategy, Samak and his Prachakorn Thai Party attempted to discredit the burgeoning PDP by linking it heavily to Santi Asoke throughout their 1988 campaign. The Prachakorn Thai Party was well equipped to pursue such a tactic, given the strong, cohesive internal dynamics of the party's experienced campaign team. Their cause resonated with the Parian Tham Association, a conservative Buddhist organization which denounced Santi Asoke's "illegality" (due to its claim that it was not under the jurisdiction of sangha authority) and the sect's ties to the Palang Dharma Party. In June 1988, a Prachakorn Thai Party member admitted that his party had aided the organization in printing and distributing around 50,000 leaflets which condemned the PDP throughout Bangkok.

Unfortunately, the fact Santi Asoke had made no secret of its affiliation with the Palang Dharma Party proved to be the latter's undoing in the 1988 election campaign. Political opponents exploited this connection, pointing to "slip-ups" such as that of Dokya, the Santi Asoke magazine, which had labeled the emerging PDP as a "golden dream" and had quoted Phothirak as having said "religion and politics were one and the same". By this point, what had begun as a campaign strategy to discredit Chamlong and his PDP had escalated into a full-scale inquisition of the Santi Asoke sect, as orthodox sangha members became involved. Phra Sophon Ganabhorn, the assistant abbot of Wat Bowonniwet, the most prestigious royal temple in Bangkok, denounced Santi Asoke as a potential "threat to the stability of Buddhism in Thailand". The abbot went on to claim that "As a top administrator who could become prime minister in the future, [Chamlong] should not support Santi Asoke, which has introduced a dangerous cult that could be dangerous to national security". Underlying this criticism is the implication that having Palang Dharma Party members in parliament would seem to legitimize Santi Asoke, and by extension appear to allow for the creation of a new Thai Buddhist order which would disrupt religious and political stability within the nation.

Ultimately, while the Palang Dharma Party's founder Chamrong Srimuang was successful in winning Bangkok governorship in 1985 on his anti-corruption and Buddhist principles-inspired platform, the PDP was not as fortunate in its 1988 general election results. Of 357 total seats in Parliament, the PDP won only 14; that is, 3.9 percent of the available seats. Testifying to the effects of the harmful press against Santi Asoke, of the few newly elected PDP members of parliament, only one was a Santi Asoke follower. The other thirteen MPs were elected on the basis of other, more "traditional" reasons: they had previous parliamentary experience, they held high positions in the military, they were medical doctors or had a PhD, etc.

In the following years the Palang Dharma Party would grow in popularity, especially within Bangkok, due in great part to the continued popularity of its founder. The PDP would go on to win admirable victories in both the March and September 1992 general elections (41 and 47 seats, respectively), as well as a reasonably healthy number of seats in the July 1995 election (23 seats).

== Government participation ==
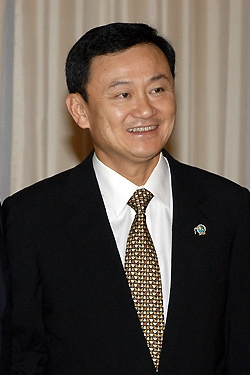
Thaksin Shinwatra, party leader 1995–1996

After 1992, Chamlong passed on the chairmanship to business tycoon and former Social Action Party politician Boonchu Rojanastien, but remained the party's de facto leader until 1995. After the parliamentary election in September 1992, Phalang Dharma joined a Democrat-led government coalition under Chuan Leekpai, but retired from it in 1995, depriving Chuan of his parliamentary majority and forcing him to resign. This led to several members leaving the party and the leadership was handed over to Prime Minister-to-be Thaksin Shinawatra, an exponent of the pragmatist faction.

== Role of Thaksin Shinawatra ==
Already a successful businessman at the time, Thaksin Shinawatra joined the Palang Dharma Party in November 1994, taking the post of a Cabinet foreign minister, marking his political debut. Thaksin identified with the "pragmatist" faction of the Palang Dharma Party, as opposed to the "temple" faction largely formed by Santi Asoke devotees such as PDP founder Chamlong Srimuang. Indeed, at the time of his entry to the party, Thaksin's career could have been described as "single-mindedly dedicated to the pursuit of wealth", standing in stark opposition to that of "temple" faction party members who practiced lifestyles of thrift and moderation. Despite their apparent differences with Chamlong's religious principles, Thaksin as well as other wealthy "new-generation Bangkok businessmen" were reputedly drawn to the PDP due to its anti-corruption agenda and its promotion of "new-style" politics.

Thaksin's joining the Palang Dharma Party exacerbated existing conflict within the party. Specifically, a great number of PDP members objected to his holding the post of foreign minister, criticizing the appointment of "outsiders" such as new-generation businessmen to cabinet positions. Furthermore, after Chamlong relinquished party leadership to Thaksin in 1995, under the soon-to-be prime minister's leadership, the PDP moved in a direction increasingly distant from its founding Buddhist-inspired principles, thus further widening the divide between divergent party factions. Thaksin himself, as the face of the Phalang Dharma Party, served to further diminish the party's reputation with the public. Specifically, according to British writer Chris Baker and Thai economist Pasuk Phongpaichit, whereas Chamlong had steered the PDP in the direction of "cleaner and more principled politics", "...in the public mind, Thaksin was a concession hunter associated with some of the most flagrant 'money politicians'... and with the corrupt and discredited 1991-2 coup junta."

On the subject of the PDP's eventual collapse in 1996 whilst under the leadership of Thaksin, Southeast Asian politics specialist Duncan McCargo writes, "In effect, Thaksin had—in the space of twelve months—destroyed the bulk of the political 'credit' built up by Chamlong and the Phalang Tham over eleven years of hard work in the capital. Phalang Tham had become part of the problem with Thai politics, rather than part of the solution."

== Decline ==
Under Thaksin the party moved away from religious policies and joined the coalition government of Banharn Silpa-archa, in which Thaksin served as deputy prime minister. From that time on, the party declined. By 1996, the Palang Dharma Party had fallen into near-total collapse due to factional conflicts within the party. The final decisive blow was struck in the November 1996 election, in which the PDP managed to procure only a single parliamentary seat, a devastating result compared to its respectable 23 seats won in the last election of July 1995. Almost immediately following the PDP's sobering electoral defeat, party leader Thaksin resigned from his top position. He cited the Democrats' landslide victory as an indicator of voters' demands from the new government: "a prime minister and a good economic team" in the face of economic hard times, a package neatly offered by the Democrats' "cure for economy" campaign pledge. Thaksin went on to say, "What we [the PDP] have done [through Parliament in the past] has been rejected by society. We offered the best we could. We have never done anything bad." That is, in terms of the latter remark, Palang Dharma had supposedly "always gone by the ethics, never bought votes and none of its ministers have ever been cited for corruption".

Following his resignation, Thaksin expressed his belief that the PDP would remain struggling for continued existence and growth due to "its own limitations caused by its strict adherence to principles". Specifically, while the former party leader professed having great respect for the underlying ideology of the PDP, he believed it nevertheless failed to "adjust its thinking to keep up with the modern world", having found the party to be "too innocent", "disorganized", and "backward looking" in his time at the PDP's helm.

Chamlong ran again for governor of Bangkok in 1996, but lost and left politics. Despite the political ground lost by the PDP in 1996 and in the following years, Buddhist criticism of the political establishment, as represented by Palang Dharma, and Chamlong's campaign for "clean politics" can be seen as one of the factors that led to the 1998 constitutional change.

On 14 July 1998, Thaksin launched the Thai Rak Thai Party, which was joined by many former Phalang Dharma leaders.

== Leader ==
- Maj. Gen Chamlong Srimuang (1988–1992)
- Admiral Siri Sirirangsi (1992)
- Boonchu Rojanastien (1992–1995)
- Thaksin Shinawatra (1995–1996)
- Chaiwat Sinsuwong (1996–1998)

== See also ==
- Chamlong Srimuang
- Boonchu Rojanastien
- Thaksin Shinawatra
- Sudarat Keyuraphan
- Santi Asoke
- New Palangdharma Party
