= Volunteer Defense Corps (Thailand) =

Thai paramilitary force

- กองอาสารักษาดินแดน
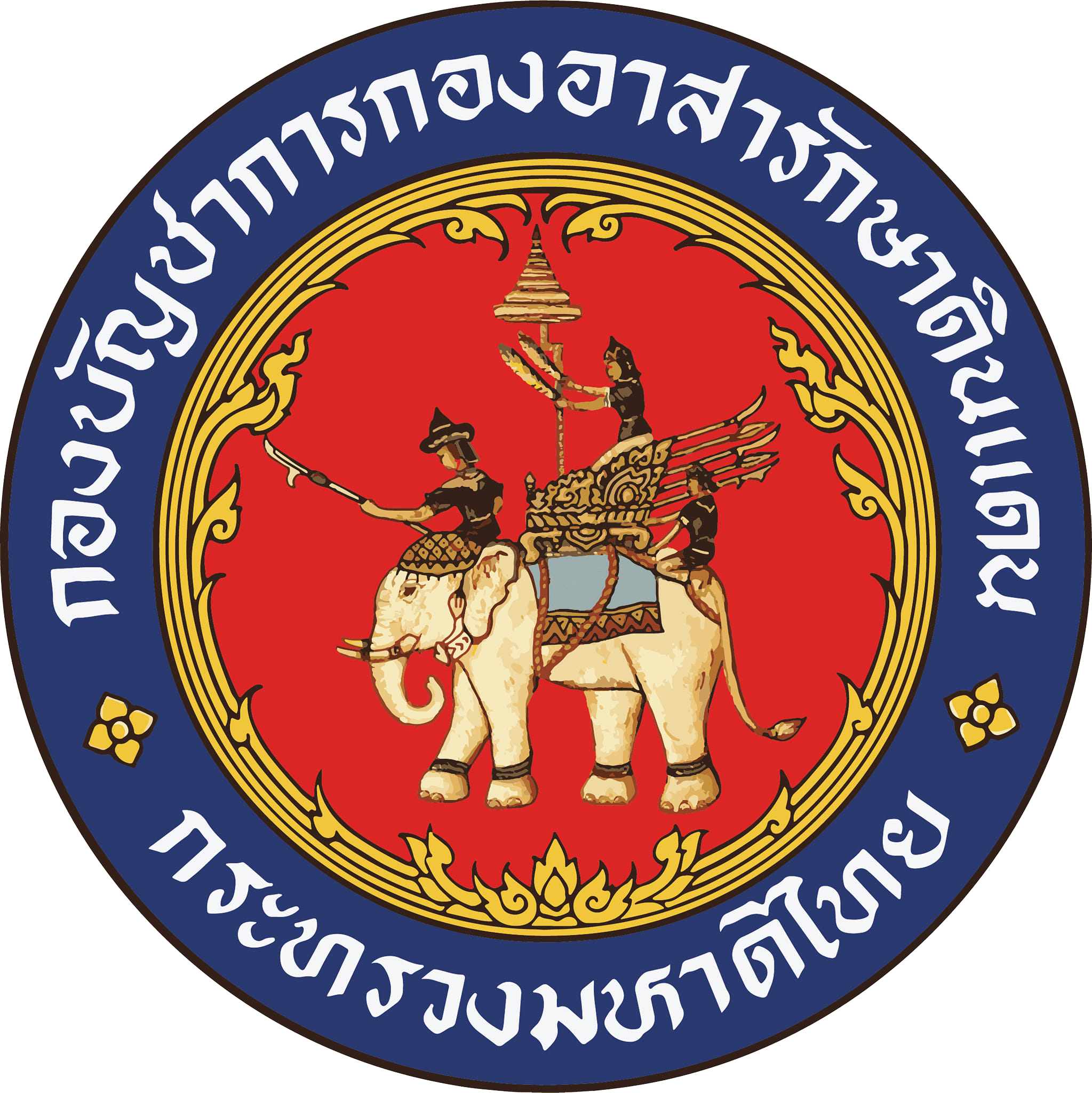
- Emblem of the Volunteer Defense Corps
- Founded: 10 February 1954
- Country: Thailand
- Type: Paramilitary
- Role: Close-quarters combat Counterinsurgency; Crowd control Executive protection Force protection Humanitarian aid HUMINT; Internal security Jungle warfare Law enforcement Patrolling; Psychological warfare Raiding; Reconnaissance; Tactical emergency medical services Urban warfare
- Part of: Department of Provincial Administration, Ministry of Interior
- Garrison/HQ: Bangkok, Thailand
- Engagements: Communist insurgency in Thailand; South Thailand Insurgency

Commanders
- Minister of Interior: VDC General Anutin Charnvirakul

The Volunteer Defense Corps (Thai: กองอาสารักษาดินแดน; abbreviated VDC) is a paramilitary under the authority of the Department of Provincial Administration (DOPA), Ministry of Interior. It was founded in 1954 to provide extra military support to the Royal Thai Armed Forces and to protect local civilians living near Thailand's borders.

== History ==
The Volunteer Defense Corps (colloquially called Or Sor in Thailand) was formally established on 10 February 1954 by the Thai Border Patrol Police (BPP) in response to complaints by civilians of banditry and harassment by insurgent and separatist organizations. Originally, the VDC's purpose was to protect civilians from insurgents who had crossed into Thai border provinces from neighboring Cambodia, Laos and Malaysia. VDC members were trained by the BPP and sent to protect civilians and farms from extortion and attacks by insurgents.

In 1974, the VDC was expanded by the Internal Security Operations Command (ISOC) to urban areas to fight communist insurgents. In the late-1980s, VDC strength was estimated at 33,000, down from a peak of about 52,000 in 1980. Part of the decrease in numbers was due to the formation of the Thahan Phran, a paramilitary unit formed to counter communist insurgents, which absorbed some units of the VDC.

Since 2004, the VDC has had a major role in fighting the South Thailand insurgency.

== Volunteer Defense Corps ranks ==
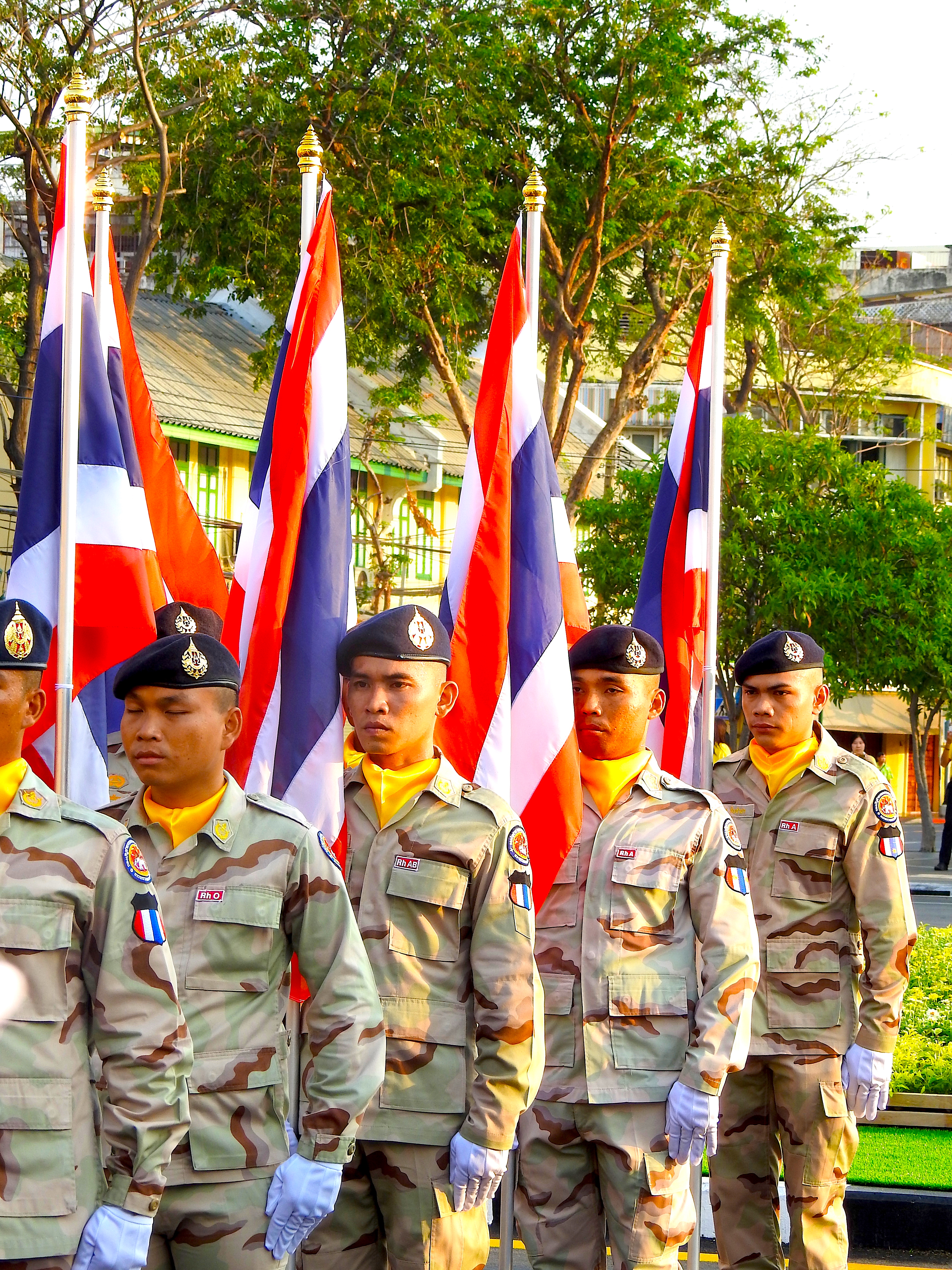
Thai Volunteer Defense Corps uniform

Officers

Rank group	General / flag officers	Senior officers			Junior officers
Volunteer Defense Corps
Volunteer Defense Corps	นายกองใหญ่ Nāyk xng h̄ıỵ̀	นายกองเอก; Nāyk xng xek	นายกองโท; Nāyk xng tho	นายกองตรี Nāyk xng trī	นายหมวดเอก; Nāy h̄mwd xek	นายหมวดโท; Nāy h̄mwd tho	นายหมวดตรี Nāy h̄mwd trī
Volunteer Defense Corps	VDC General	VDC Colonel	VDC Lieutenant Colonel	VDC Major	VDC Captain	VDC First Lieutenant	VDC Second Lieutenant

Enlisted

Rank group	Senior NCOs		Junior NCOs		Enlisted
Volunteer Defense Corps
Volunteer Defense Corps	นายหมู่ใหญ่ Nāy h̄mū̀ h̄ıỵ̀	นายหมู่เอก; Nāy h̄mū̀ xek	นายหมู่โท; Nāy h̄mū̀ tho	นายหมู่ตรี Nāy h̄mū̀ trī	สมาชิกเอก; S̄māchik xek	สมาชิกโท; S̄māchik tho	สมาชิกตรี S̄māchik trī	สมาชิก; S̄māchik
Volunteer Defense Corps	VDC Sergeant major	VDC Sergeant	VDC Corporal	VDC Lance corporal	VDC Member 1st class	VDC Member 2nd class	VDC Member 3rd class	VDC Member

== Flags ==
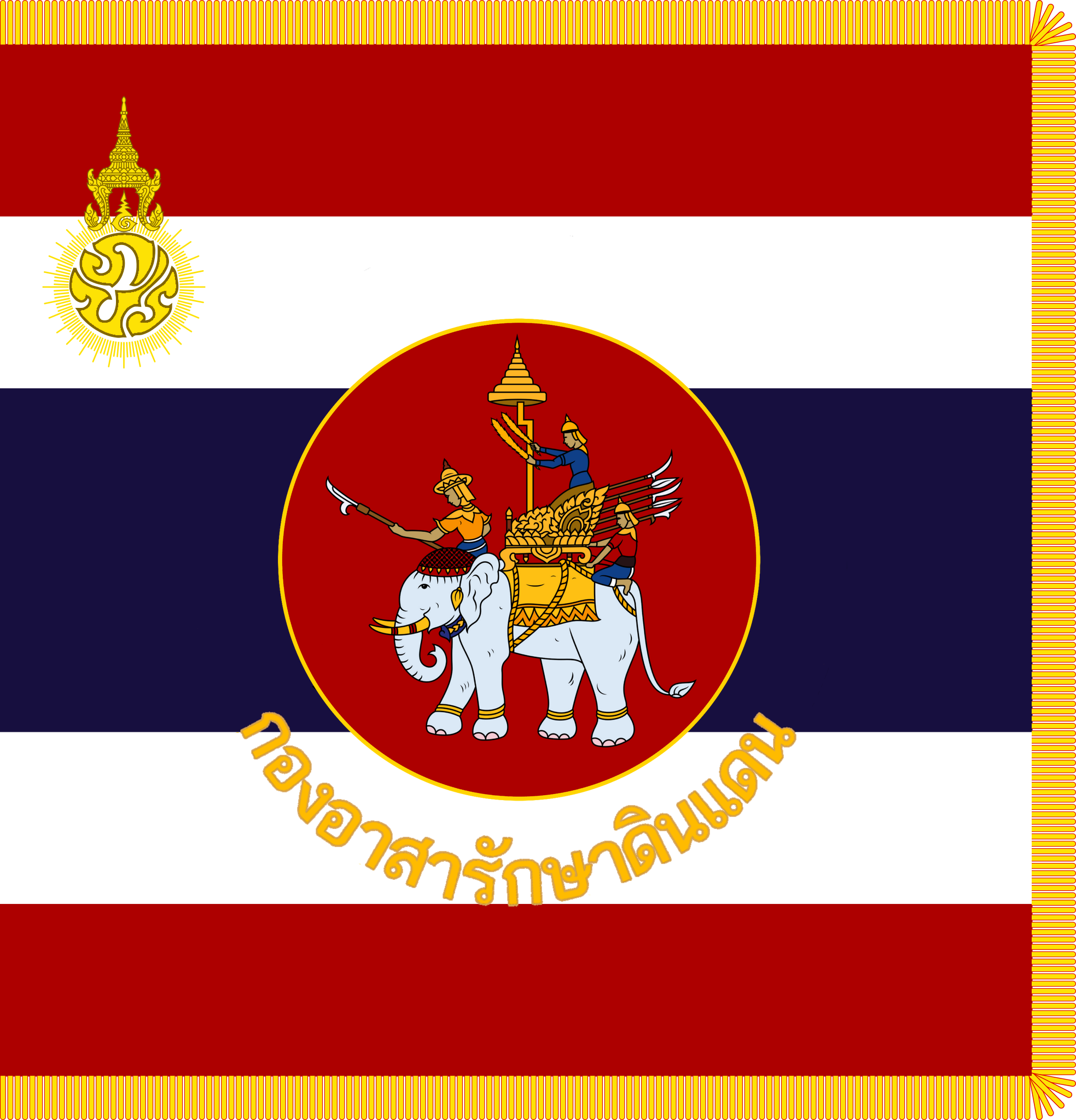
Royal standard of the VDC

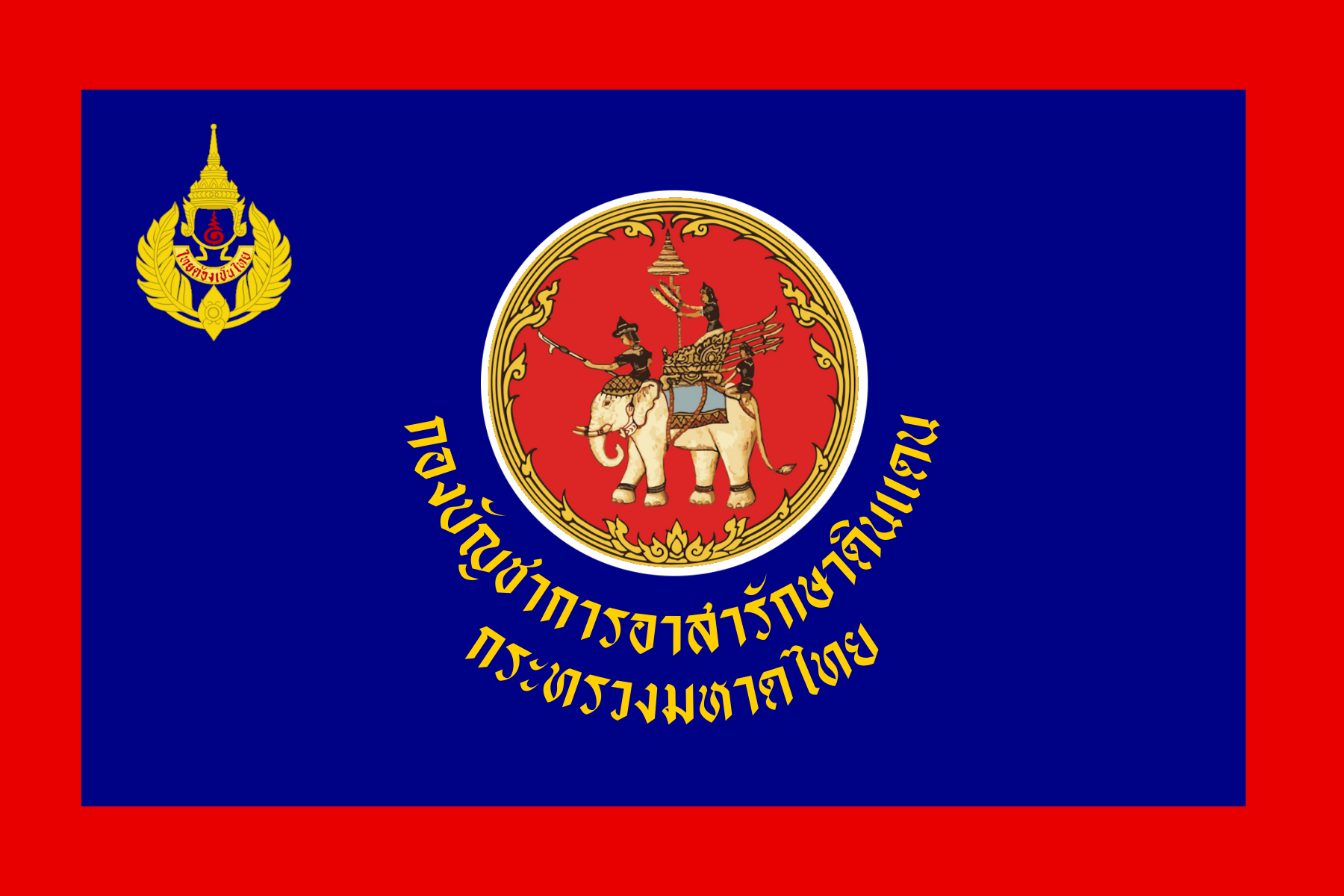
Flag of the VDC

== See also ==
- Militia (China)
