= Bhichit Rattakul =

Thai politician (born 1946)

- พิจิตต รัตตกุล
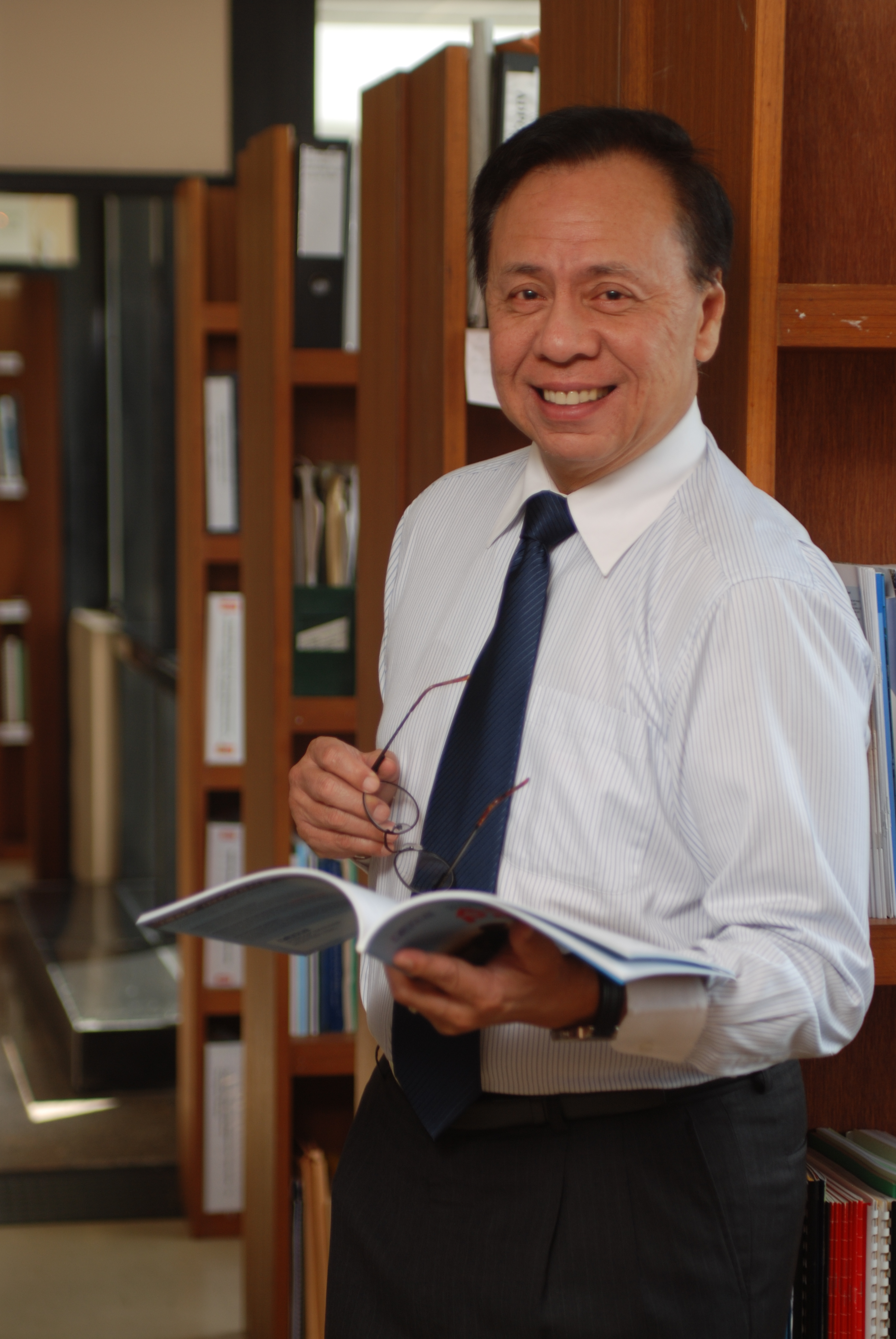

12th Governor of Bangkok
- In office 3 June 1996 – 22 July 2000
- Preceded by: Krisda Arunvongse na Ayudhya
- Succeeded by: Samak Sundaravej

Personal details
- Born: 30 August 1946 (age 80) Bangkok, Thailand
- Party: Independent
- Parent: Bhichai Rattakul (father)
- Education: Brigham Young University
- Occupation: Politician

Bhichit Rattakul (Thai: พิจิตต รัตตกุล, RTGS: Phichit Rattakun, born August 30, 1946) is a Thai politician who served as the governor of Bangkok from 1996 to 2000 and the deputy minister for Science, Technology, and Energy from 1986 to 1988. He is the son of former foreign minister and deputy prime minister Bhichai Rattakul and is of Thai Chinese descent.

== Early life and educations ==
Bhichit earned a Ph.D. in Chemical Engineering from Brigham Young University in 1976 and was instrumental in the September 2000 Thailand visit of LDS Church president Gordon B. Hinckley. As of May 2008, Bhichit serves as Director of the Asian Disaster Preparedness Center, which is run under the auspices of the United Nations.

== Honours ==
- Knight grand Cross in the Order of the White Elephant.
- Knight grand Cross in the Order of the Crown of Thailand.
- Knight grand Commander in the Order of Chula Chom Klao.
- Knight grand Cross by the Emperor of Japan.

Political offices
Preceded by Kritsada Arunwong na Ayutthaya	Governor of Bangkok; 1996–2000	Succeeded by Samak Sundaravej
