= 2023 Rayong 3rd district by-election =

By-election in Rayong's 3rd constituency

2023 by-election in Rayong's 3rd constituency
- 10 September 2023

Rayong's 3rd constituency
- Registered: 122,582
- Turnout: 56.52% ▼21.35 pp
	First party	Second party	Third party
	MFP	DEM	NBLP
Candidate	Phongsathorn Sornphetnarin	Banyat Chetanachan	Ruangchai Sombatphoothon
Party	Move Forward	Democrat	Nation Building Labour Party
Popular vote	39,296	26,376	881
Percentage	59.04%	39.63%	1.32%
Swing	▲26.59 pp	▲23.24 pp	New
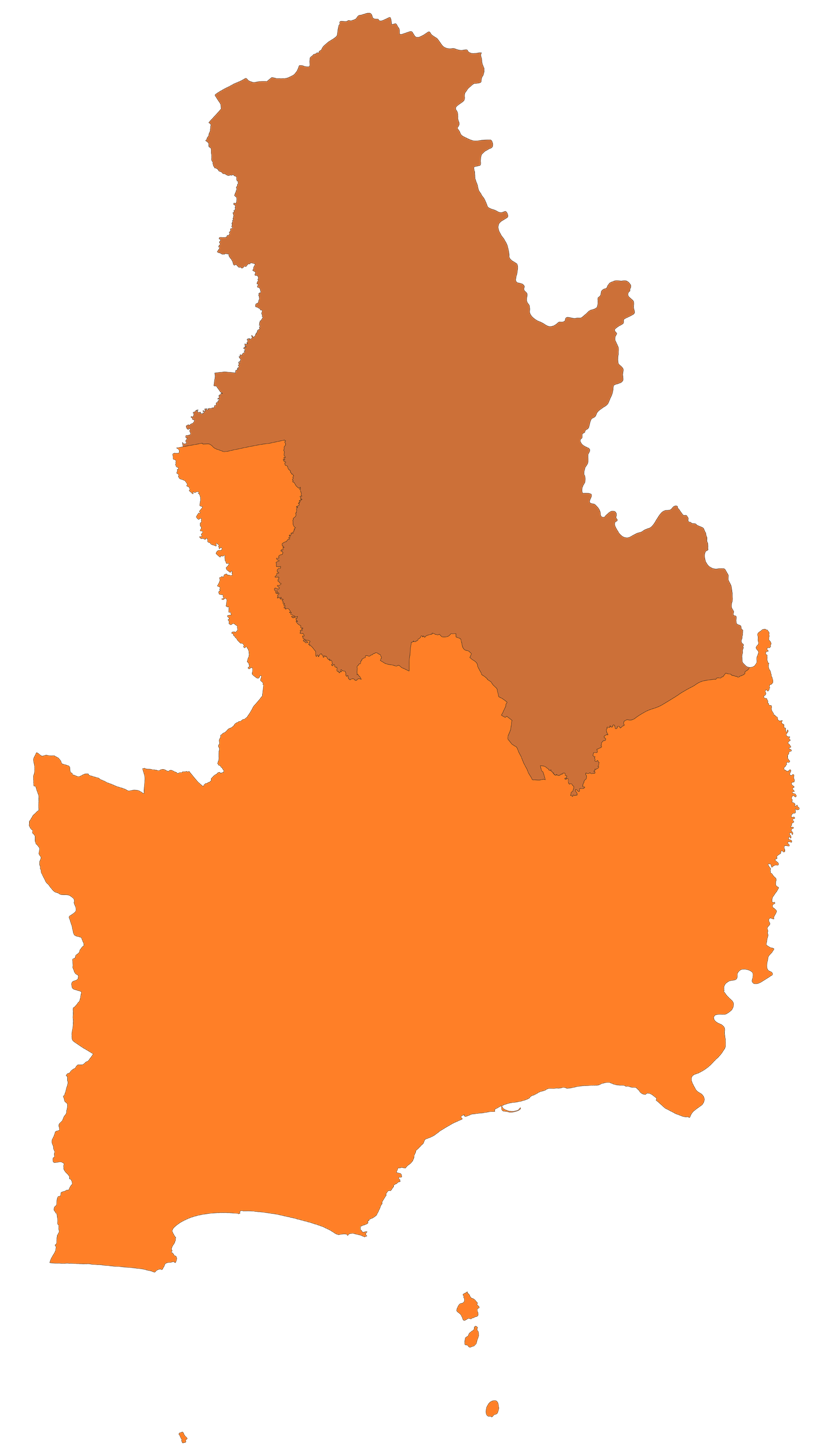
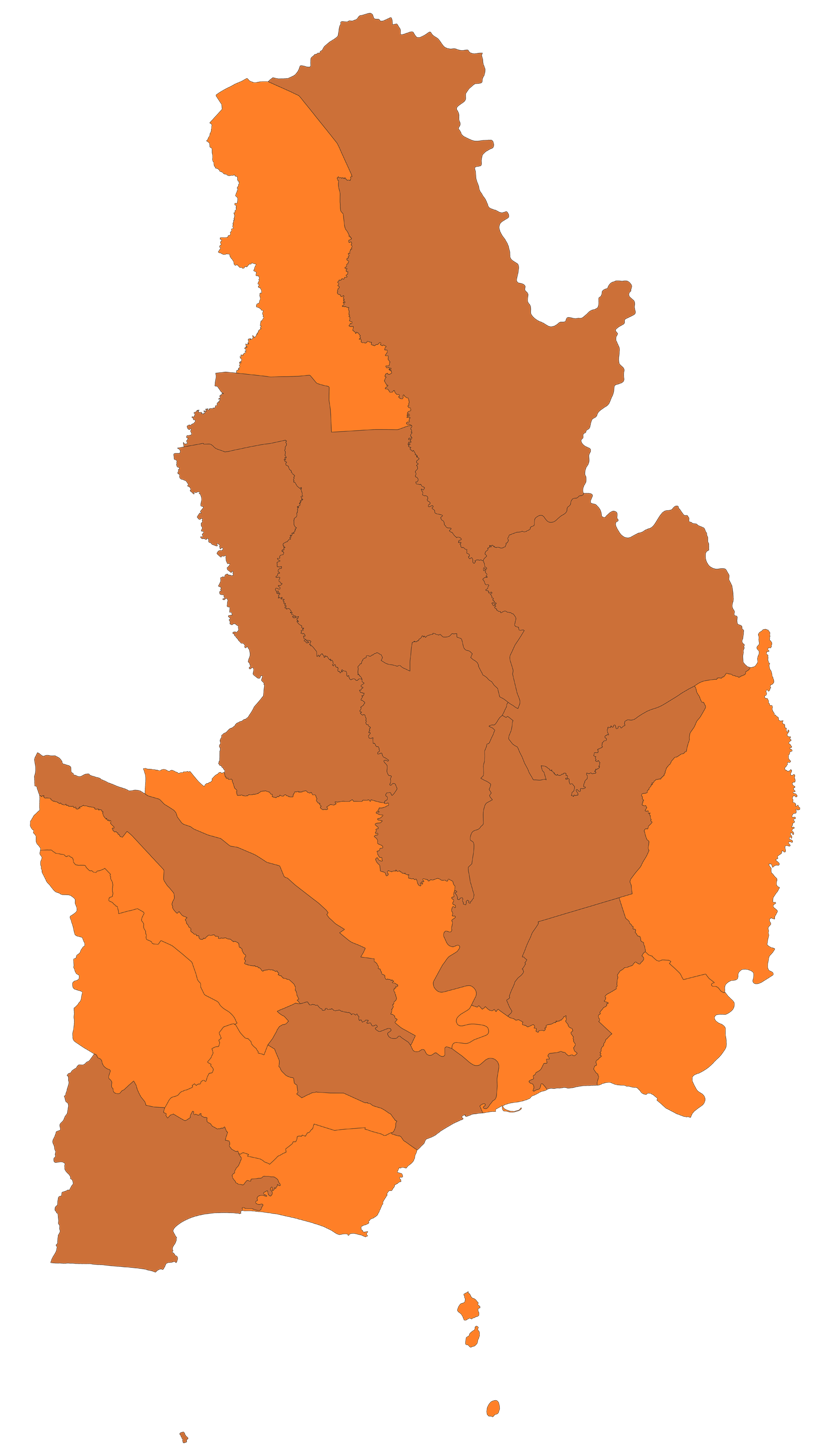
- Phongsathorn: 50-60% 60-70%
MP before election
Nakhonchai Khunnarong
Move Forward
Elected MP
Phongsathorn Sornpetchnarin
Move Forward

The 2023 Rayong 3rd district by-election was a by-election held on 10 September to elect the next member of the Thai House of Representatives in Rayong's 3rd district. The by-election was held as a result of the resignation of Move Forward MP, Nakornchai Khunnarong, on 3 August after it was discovered Nakornchai had a criminal record.

On 20 August 2023, the Thai Electoral Commission (EC) announced the date of the by-election to be 10 September. The EC also announced that any candidates hoping to run in the election would have to register in August 15 to 19. By the end of the deadline, three candidates registered, representing the Move Forward, Democrat and the Nation Building Labour.

Move Forward was expected to win in a landslide, with party leader Pita Limjaroenrat calling on voters to deliver its candidate a landslide. The election was the first election in Thailand since the general elections. Phongsathorn Sornpetchnarin, the candidate of the Move Forward Party, won the seat with a large margin, beating the Democrat candidate by just under 20 percent.

2023 general election results in Rayong province. The 3rd district is shown in the province's east.

== Background ==
Prior to the 2023 Thai general election, the Rayong's 3rd district was represented by the Democrat MP Bunyat Chetanachan. Following the 2023 election, Move Forward candidate Nakornchai Khunnarong won the seat from the Democrats, gaining 29,034 votes or 30.4% of the total vote.

On 26 July 2023, Thai Liberal Party MP Sereepisuth Temeeyaves revealed that Nakhonchai had previously been imprisoned in for a year and six months in 1999 due to a theft case. As Article 98 of the 2017 constitution prohibits those who have previously been imprisoned from running to be an MP, Nakhonchai could face a jail term of one to ten years and a fine of 20,000 to 200,000 baht.

Nakornchai resigned on 3 August.

As a by-election, there was no advance voting, or voting from outside the constituency, including overseas voting. Rayong 3rd district has 207 polling stations, with 178 of them in Klaeng district and 29 in Khao Chamao district. There is a total of 122,582 potential voters in both districts.

=== 2023 general election results ===
2023: Rayong's 3rd constituency
Party	Candidate	Votes	%
Move Forward	Nakhonchai Khunnarong	29,034	32.45
Palang Pracharath	Payap Phongsai	21,726	24.28
Democrat	Banyat Chetanachan	14,668	16.39
Pheu Thai	Chainarong Santasanachok	11,647	13.01
Chart Pattana	Paloch Krisanaracha	3,772	4.21
United Thai Nation	Boonsanong Hiranrak	3,608	4.03
Thai Liberal	Mokhuat Lekpet	2,755	3.07
Bhumjaithai	Yossapon Onta	1,004	1.12
Pakdee	Thruesadi Thanaboribun	606	0.67
Thai Sang Thai	Wutthi Prasingchob	492	0.54
Klong Thai Party	Mochot Ubonprasert	158	0.17
Total votes		89,470	100.00%
Turnout		95,520	77.87
Move Forward win (new boundaries)			

== Candidates ==
Ballot Number	Party	Candidate
1	Move Forward	Phongsathorn Sornpetchnarin
2	Democrat	Banyat Chetanachan
3	Nation Building Labour Party	Ruangchai Sombatphoothon

On August 11, the EC announced that the by-election would be held on 10 September 2023, and that candidate applications would be open from 15–19 August. Registrations opened on 15 August at Klaeng district's community hall. Three candidates successfully registered for the by-election.

Phongsathorn Sornphetnarin, who had previously been a party-list candidate for the Move Forward Party during the general election, registered on 15 August for the Move Forward party. At 41 years-old, Pongsathorn has been an advocate against factory construction in the district which damages the environment, and previously served as the secretary of the Student Federation of Thailand.

Banyat Chetanachan, who had been the Democrat Party's candidate for the constituency in the general election, announced his intention to contest the by-election on 3 August. He registered on 16 August. He had previously served as an MP from Rayong for 16 years from 2007 to 2023, winning re-election in 2011 and 2019. It was also speculated that Satit Pitutecha, the deputy leader of the Democrat Party, would have been the party's candidate. The parties of the previous government agreed to consolidate behind the Democrat candidate to avoid vote splitting.

Ruangchai Sombatphoothon registered for the by-election on August 19 as the Nation Building Labour Party's candidate (also called Rang-ngan Sang Chart party). Ruangchai is a retired police officer who previously ran during the general election in Rayong 2nd district and came in eighth place out of the nine candidates who ran, winning 457 votes.

== Election ==
=== Campaign ===
On 25 August 2023, the three candidates agreed to not engage in corrupt practices during the campaign. Party leader and Move Forward candidate for the 2023 election, Pita Limjaroenrat, began campaigning for the first time since the May election. On 15 August, with Pongsathorn, they paraded from Kaeng district's community hall to the local market, rallying supporters along the way. Pita and Pongsathorn began campaigning together in Klaeng and Khao Chamao districts the same day.

On 26 August, Watanya Bunnag arrived in Klaeng district to promote the Democrat candidate Banyat Jettanachan. Watanya led a convoy of supporters from Klaeng Hospital to Sam Yan market. In Klaeng, Watanya also said that voters should consider the candidate over the party.

Phongsathorn Sornpetchnarin would come under criticism for his lack of personal income tax payments, although the EC said on September 4 that not paying income tax was not a disqualifying factor. In response, Phongsathorn submitted related documents to the EC. On 7 September, the EC confirmed Phongsathorn's qualifications.

On 8 September, Jurin Laksanawisit and Watanya Bunnag campaigned in Muang district along with Democrat MPs from other provinces. At the same time, Pita and the secretary-general of the Move Forward party, Chaitawat Tulathon, were campaigning in Klaeng district.

=== Aftermath ===
In the morning of 10 September, before voting started, the Governor of Rayong province, Triphop Wongtrairat, visited Polling Unit 9 in Klaeng district, which was later visited by Sermsak Karun, former Deputy Minister of Finance, who voted at the station. Voting was open from 8:00 a.m to 5:00 p.m.

At 7:00 p.m local time, unofficial results of the election were released with Move Forward as the victor. In response to his party's victory in the election, Pita said in Klaeng district that he would use the momentum gained by the victory to launch future campaigns.

== Results ==
2023: Rayong's 3rd constituency
Party	Candidate	Votes	%	±%
Move Forward	Phongsathorn Sornpetchnarin	39,296	59.04%	+26.59%
Democrat	Banyat Chetanachan	26,376	39.63%	+23.24%
Nation Building Labour Party	Ruangchai Sombatphoothon	881	1.32%	New
Total votes		66,553		
Turnout		69,284	56.52%	
Move Forward hold				
