= Watanya Bunnag =

Thai politician and businesswoman

Watanya Bunnag PM (GCCT)
- วทันยา บุนนาค

Personal details
- Born: 13 November 1984 (age 41) Thailand
- Party: independent
- Other political affiliations: Democrat (2022–2025) Palang Pracharath (2018–2022)
- Spouse: Shine Bunnag
- Children: 2, including Pojai, Popiang
- Education: Faculty of Liberal Arts, Thammasat University
- Occupation: Politician; businesswoman

Watanya "Dear" Bunnag (Thai: วทันยา บุนนาค, born 13 November 1984), also known as Madame Dear, is a Thai politician and businesswoman. She previously served as a party-list MP for the Palang Pracharath Party before joining the Democrat Party.

== Early life and education ==
Watanya (née Wongopasi) graduated from the Faculty of Liberal Arts, Thammasat University. While she was a student, she used to be a cheerleader in the Chula–Thammasat Traditional Football Match.

== Careers ==
=== Football and business ===
Watanya is widely known for being the manager of Thailand national under-21 football team and Thailand national under-23 football team.

In addition, she also used to be the president of the News Network Corporation PCL. (Spring News).

=== Political career ===
Politically, Watanya was a party-list MP for the Palang Pracharath Party from the general election in 2019. She was the leader of a group called "Constellation", which consisted of approximately six MPs in Bangkok. On August 16, 2022, she resigned from being an MP and a member of the Palang Pracharat Party.

Later, on September 22 of the same year, she ran to become a member of the Democrat Party. Watanya was also appointed as the head of the party's political innovation team in the Bangkok Metropolitan Region for the general election in 2023.

After the Democrat Party’s massive loss in the 2023 general election which prompted the resignation of the party’s leader, Jurin Laksanawisit, Wattanya ran for party leadership along with former prime minister Abhisit Vejjajiva, the party’s acting leader Chalermchai Sri-on, and Lt-Colonel Thita Rangsitpol Manitkul.

On 9 December 2023, the Democrat Party commenced a meeting to elect its new leader. However, under Democrat Party regulation No. 31, a candidate for the party leader’s post must have served as a Democrat member of Parliament and been a member of the party for a minimum of five years. Watanya meets neither of these two requirements.

An exception could be made for a candidate who gains approval from more than three-fourths of members attending the meeting. Watanya would have needed 196 out of 261 votes to meet the requirement. However, she garnered only 139, forcing her out of the race. After acknowledging her loss, Watanya immediately left the meeting with tears in her eyes. She told reporters that she was thankful for all the support and said the only way for revival of the party was to bring back its longstanding ideology.

Watanya said she would take some time to contemplate whether she would continue with the party or not, adding that she would not be taking up any positions within the party.

On 23 June 2025, she resigned from the Democrat Party after its new leadership, headed by Chalermchai Sri-on, resolved to join the coalition government led by the Pheu Thai Party, with Paetongtarn Shinawatra serving as Prime Minister. She stated that she could not accept the party's decision.

During the 2026 general election, although she had already resigned from the Democrat Party, the party later underwent a leadership change, with former party leader Abhisit Vejjajiva returning to head the party once again. At a Democrat Party campaign event held at Benchasiri Park, Watanya was seen beside the stage, where she offered words of encouragement and expressed her support for the party's candidates, albeit in an unofficial capacity.

On 2 July 2026, she was nominated by the Democrat Party to serve as a member of the parliamentary committee responsible for scrutinizing the Fiscal Year 2027 budget. She was appointed as an external representative outside the party's parliamentary quota. She expressed her gratitude to the Democrat Party for the nomination but stated that she had not yet made a final decision on when she would return to active politics.

== Family life ==
Watanya married (officially) to Shine Bunnag, The Nation CEO, in 2022, after 13 years of living together. The couple has two children.

== Royal decorations ==
- 2017 - Knight Commander (Second Class).
