= People's Agenda =

People's Agenda (Thai: วาระประชาชน; RTGS: Wara Prachachon) is a policy under the Democrat party that implements the concept of “policy for the people by the people”, which is consistent with the idea that “People must come first”. Thailand's Prime Minister announced that People's Agenda rested on three pillars: restoring investor's confidence, new investments to improve national competitiveness, and investments in people.

The policy aims to solve Thailand's four crises: Unity crisis, Cost of living and poverty, Competition crisis, and Moral crisis. Through the projects, it would increase employment and income, restructure public debt, improve and resolve problems related to living conditions, quality of life, and community environments. It would create economic security and social stability for senior citizens, as well as ensuring that everyone is provided with access to 15 years’ cost-free education, and lastly also promote stable economic growth.

The economy under People's Agenda must be “Quality Economy”; the growth must not be measured by just one year. Therefore, growth must be balanced with stability. Growth must be sustainable and just.

== ROAD to RECOVERY ==
=== 15 Years Free Education (เรียนฟรี 15 ปี) ===
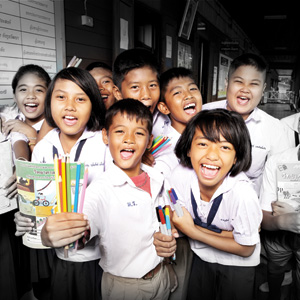
promotional picture of students in 15 years free education scheme

On the 12 of August 2009, 15 years free education policy was first initiated with the aim to lessen the financial burden of parents as well as stimulating the economy. The students who received free education program are ensured by the Education Ministry that each individual is provided a good standardized education.

The students who are covered by the program range from kindergarten to high school, including educations outside the education system. 11.8 million students have been registered and received this benefit as of 2009. Other than the education fee, the policy also covers expenses for books, utensils, uniform, school equipment, and extracurricular activities.

=== Old Age Pension (เบี้ยกตัญญู) ===
On April 9, 2009, the government initiated the old-age pension fund for old-age citizens who do not have a retirement program. Senior citizens at the age of 60 years and above who do not have any retirement benefits are eligible to receive 500 baht monthly. The policy is to increase senior citizen's contribution to society, right to dignity, and security. The aim is to reduce poverty of old-age citizens that is double that of the population as a whole. Social Pension Fund is considered an effective way to reduce poverty of senior citizens while at the same time making a contribution to stimulate the economy. As of 2009, over 5.8 Million senior citizens are registered and received the old-age pension fund nationwide.

=== Farmer’s Income Guarantee (ประกันรายได้เกษตรกร) ===
The program aims to guarantee the income of farmers. In the past, the government would buy rice crops directly from farmers at a price a lot higher than the market price and sell it at a lower price, creating compounding loss. The program has been revised and strategically changed. Instead of buying the crops, the government would agree with the farmers over a certain standard price. If the market price is lower than the agreed price, the government would subsidize the difference. Despite the critics about being a populist, the program is mainly beneficial to the poor and does not interfere with the market price which lets the economy run by itself and does not destroy the market mechanism.

The program now covers 3 different kinds of crops, which are rice, tapioca and maize, and in the future, sugarcane and some fruits. The program is expected to lower government expense to 30 billion baht when compared to the previous scheme that used up 70 billion baht of the government's budget. In addition, 3 million households would benefit from the new scheme, while the previous program impacted about 1 million households.

=== 2,000 Baht Check officially known as “Help-the-Nation” Check (เช็คช่วยชาติ) ===
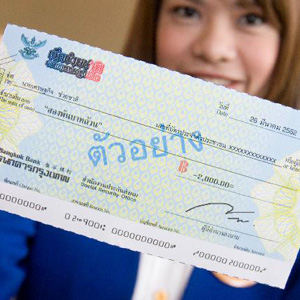
An example of 2,000 baht check given to low income people

The aim is to boost the purchasing power of low-income earners and encourage spendings. The checks are distributed to people with a monthly salary lower than 15,000 baht during March 26 to April 8, 2009. 10.5 Million government 2,000 baht checks were issued and distributed to over 10 million low-income earners throughout the country who had registered with the Social Security Fund.

The outcome of the policy is expected to boost the GDP by 0.2% and create 80,000 jobs. According to statistics, people who received the government check spend it on their daily expenses such as buying food, rent, and home appliances.

In addition, The Government has asked for help from the public sector to encourage spending by providing 10 to 20 percent discounts for consumers with the check.

=== Training for Unemployment “Ton Kla A-cheep” (ต้นกล้าอาชีพ) ===
The project's objective is to train and create jobs for 500,000 unemployed, soon to be unemployed and new graduates to reduce and prevent unemployment. Furthermore, it will promote independent occupation that will help drive the economy at grass root level. The 6.9 billion baht program was initiated on 13 January 2009 which is divided into two phases. The first phase was between April and September 2009, where 240,000 people received training. Followed by the second phase in the beginning of 2010, where the rest of 260,000 received training.

==== Trainings Provided ====
935 courses that are offered at this time are divided into 7 categories.

1. There were 118 courses in agriculture and processing.

2. Manufacturing sector offering a group of 319.

3. Services and Tourism of 298 courses.

4. Trade and economic sufficiency of 12 courses.

5. Computer and administration of 117 courses.

6. Transport and logistics of a course

7. The construction of 23 courses.

=== Informal Debt (หนี้นอกระบบ) ===
Aim to help loaners who are in debt to high-interest rate moneylenders, to shift their debts to formal financial institutions where interest rates are lower. Debt reduction cards to prevent people returning to informal debt. Currently, there are 1,195,481 debtors who have registered under the government's debt refinancing scheme accumulating 122.8 Billion baht worth of informal debt. Prime Minister Abhisit Vejjajiva officially launched the program on 19 November 2009. Thai Citizen from nationwide are then open to register during December 2009 and all applications would be processed from February to April 2010. After the application has been approved, six state-owned banks would settle down with the creditors on the debt. The maximum loan that a debtor can loan is 200,000 baht with a maximum of 10 year installment plan. Through the program, the government has reduced informal interest from informal debt up to 3 billion baht monthly.

== "People's Agenda" outside Thailand ==
- "People's Agenda" in the Philippines is a political agenda of the Bagong Alyansang Makabayan (New Patriotic Alliance)
- "Kansas People's Agenda 2017" is a group organizing to get 1,000 people to lobby their legislators in Topeka on January 11, 2017, for a typical liberal agenda. See also People's agenda on Wikiversity.
- "Coalition for the People's Agenda" is a justice advocacy organization organized in part by Joseph Lowery.
