= Banyat Bantadtan =

Thai politician (born 1942)

- บัญญัติ บรรทัดฐาน
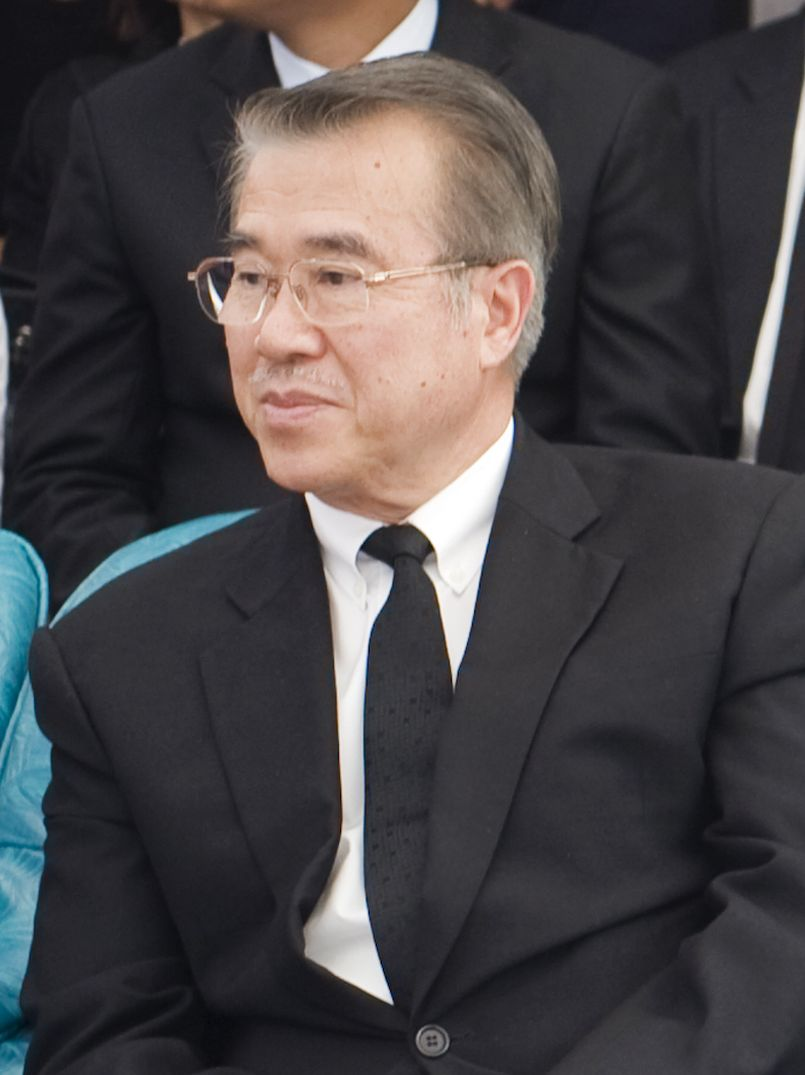
- Banyat Bantadtan in 2010

Leader of the Opposition
- In office 23 May 2003 – 5 January 2005
- Prime Minister: Thaksin Shinawatra
- Preceded by: Chuan Leekpai
- Succeeded by: Abhisit Vejjajiva

Leader of the Democrat Party
- In office 20 April 2003 – 4 March 2005
- Preceded by: Chuan Leekpai
- Succeeded by: Abhisit Vejjajiva

Deputy Prime Minister of Thailand
- In office 11 April 2000 – 9 November 2000
- Prime Minister: Chuan Leekpai

Minister of Interior
- In office 11 April 2000 – 9 November 2000
- Prime Minister: Chuan Leekpai
- Preceded by: Sanan Kachornprasart
- Succeeded by: Purachai Piamsomboon

Minister of Science and Technology
- In office 11 August 1986 – 3 August 1989
- Prime Minister: Prem Tinsulanonda
- Preceded by: Lek Nana
- Succeeded by: Prachuap Chaiyasan

Minister to the Office of the Prime Minister
- In office 7 May 1983 – 5 August 1986
- Prime Minister: Prem Tinsulanonda

Personal details
- Born: 15 May 1942 (age 84) Kanchanadit, Surat Thani, Thailand
- Party: Democrat
- Spouses: Somnuk Boonchu (Div.); Jittima Sangkasap
- Education: Thammasat University
- Profession: Politician

Banyat Bantadtan (林書清) (Thai: บัญญัติ บรรทัดฐาน; RTGS: Banyat Banthatthan, born 15 May 1942) is a Thai politician. From 2003 to 2005, he was the chairman of the Democrat Party and Leader of the Opposition against Prime Minister Thaksin Shinawatra.

== Life and career ==
Banyat Bantadtan was born in Kanchanadit, Surat Thani Province. A lawyer by training, he holds a Bachelor of Laws from the Faculty of Law, Thammasat University. In 1970, he became a lecturer for the Office of Accelerated Rural Development (ARD). In 1975, he was elected Member of Parliament for the first time. He was consistently re-elected in all subsequent elections until 2007.

Banyat was spokesman of the Democrat Party from 1979 to 1980. He was a cabinet member in the governments of General Prem Tinsulanonda, as deputy interior minister from 1980 to 1983, Minister in the Office of Prime Minister from 1983 to 1986, and as Minister of Science from 1986 to 1988. Under his fellow party member Prime Minister Chuan Leekpai, Banyat was Deputy Prime Minister from 1992 to 1995 and again in 2000, when he additionally led the Ministry of Interior.

== Democrat Party career ==
In 2003, he succeeded Chuan as chairman of the Democrat Party and became official Leader of the Opposition. He stepped back after the electoral setback in 2005. The Thai Rak Thai Party of Prime Minister Thaksin Shinawatra had won the election by a landslide. The party chose Abhisit Vejjajiva as his successor.

== Personal life ==
Banyat was married to Somnuk Boonchu and they had one child, then were divorced. After the divorce he married Jittima Sangkasap (Thai: จิตติมา สังขะทรัพย์) ex-wife of Pongpol Adireksarn. They have two children.

== Honours ==
- 1982 - Knight Grand Cordon (Special Class) of the Most Noble Order of the Crown of Thailand
- 1983 - Knight Grand Cordon (Special Class) of the Most Exalted Order of the White Elephant
