= 2005 Thai general election =

- 6 February 2005

All 500 seats in the House of Representatives 251 seats needed for a majority
- Registered: 44,572,101
- Turnout: 72.56% (▲3.13pp)
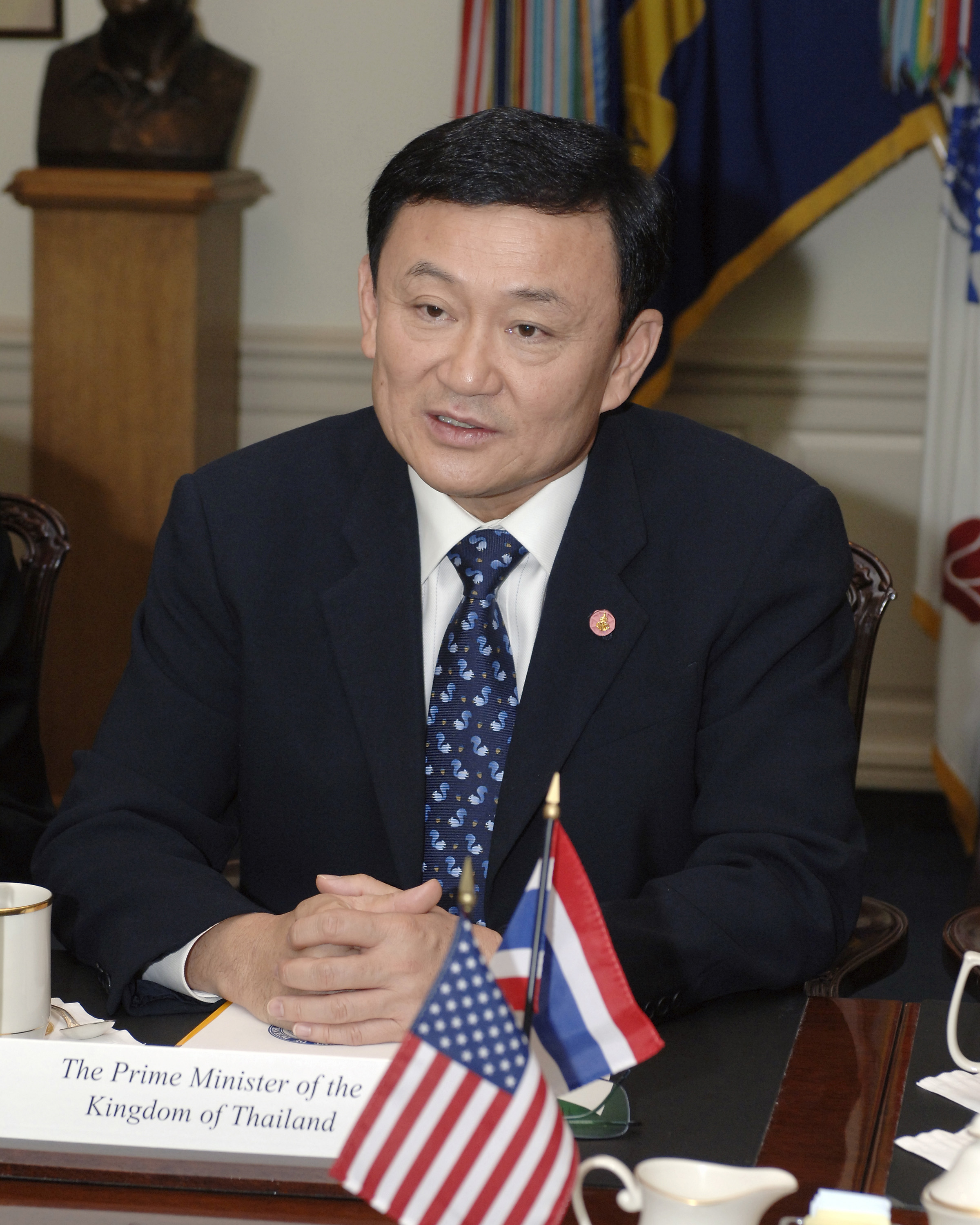

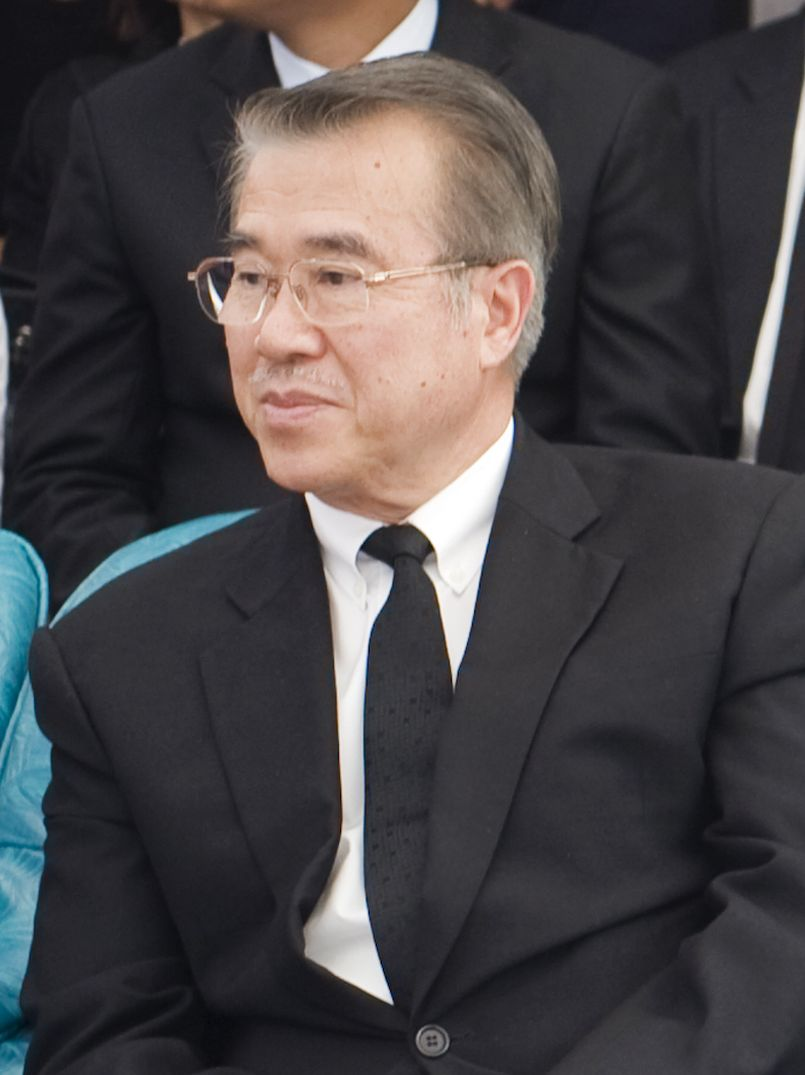

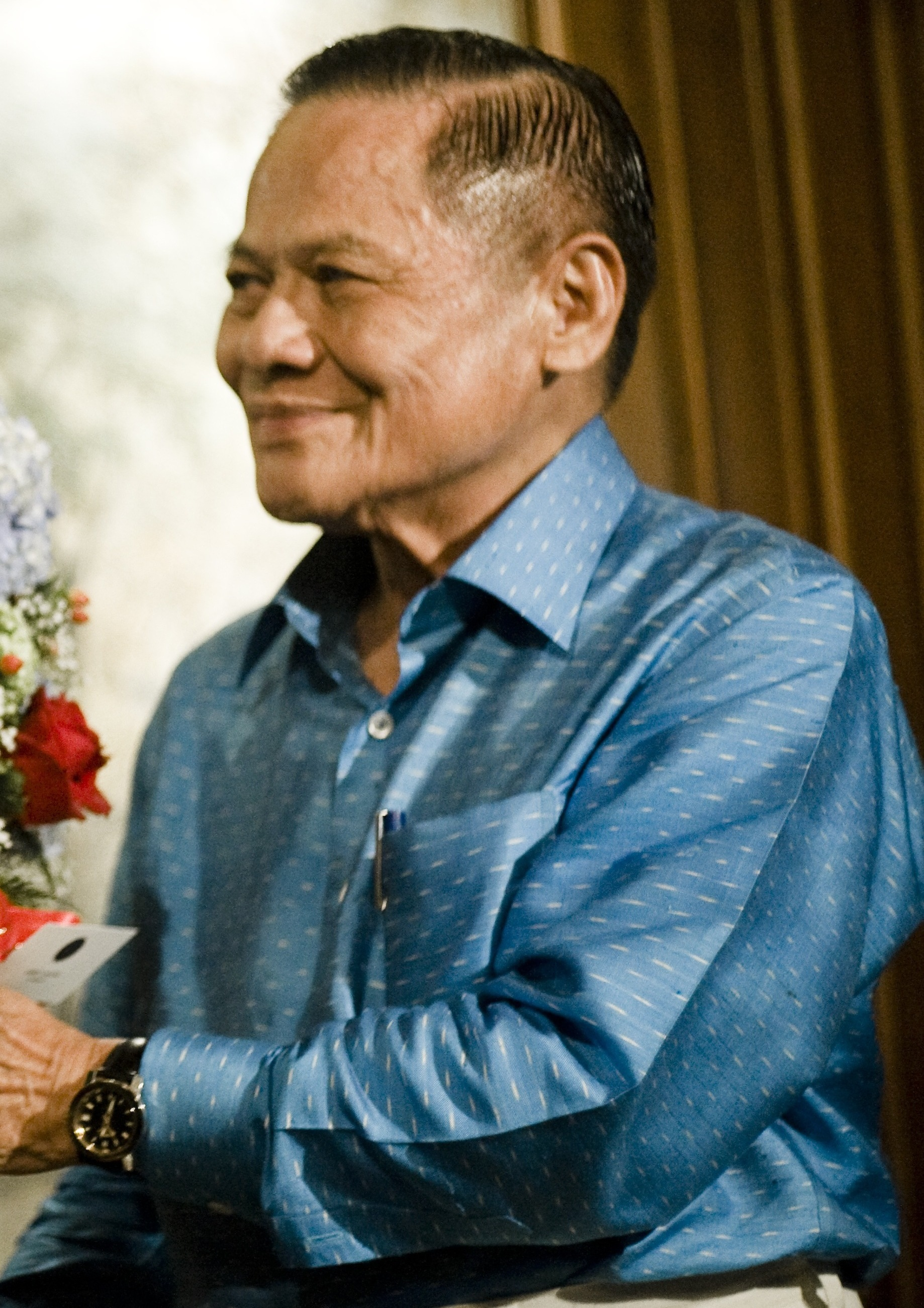

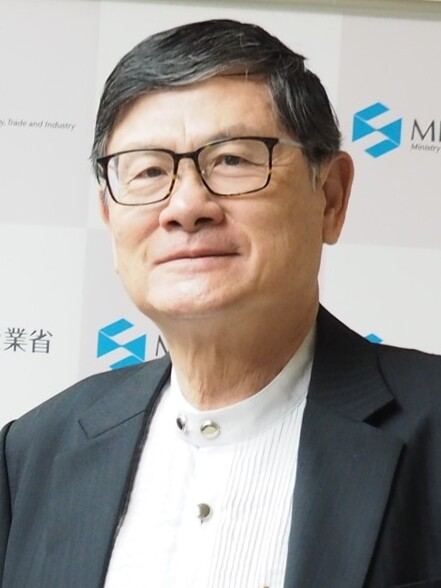
	First party	Second party
Leader	Thaksin Shinawatra	Banyat Bantadtan
Party	Thai Rak Thai	Democrat
Last election	248 seats	128 seats
Seats won	377	96
Seat change	▲128	▼31
Constituency vote	16,523,344	7,401,631
% and swing	54.35% (▲18.67pp)	24.35% (▼0.19pp)
Party-list vote	18,993,073	7,210,742
% and swing	60.48% (▲20.57pp)	22.96% (▼2.90pp)
	Third party	Fourth party
Leader	Banharn Silpa-archa	Anek Laothamatas
Party	Chart Thai	Mahachon
Last election	41 seats	2 seats
Seats won	25	2
Seat change	▼16	Steady
Constituency vote	3,119,473	2,223,399
% and swing	10.26% (▲2.01pp)	7.31% (▲4.17pp)
Party-list vote	2,061,559	1,346,631
% and swing	6.56% (▲1.33pp)	4.29% (▲3.05pp)
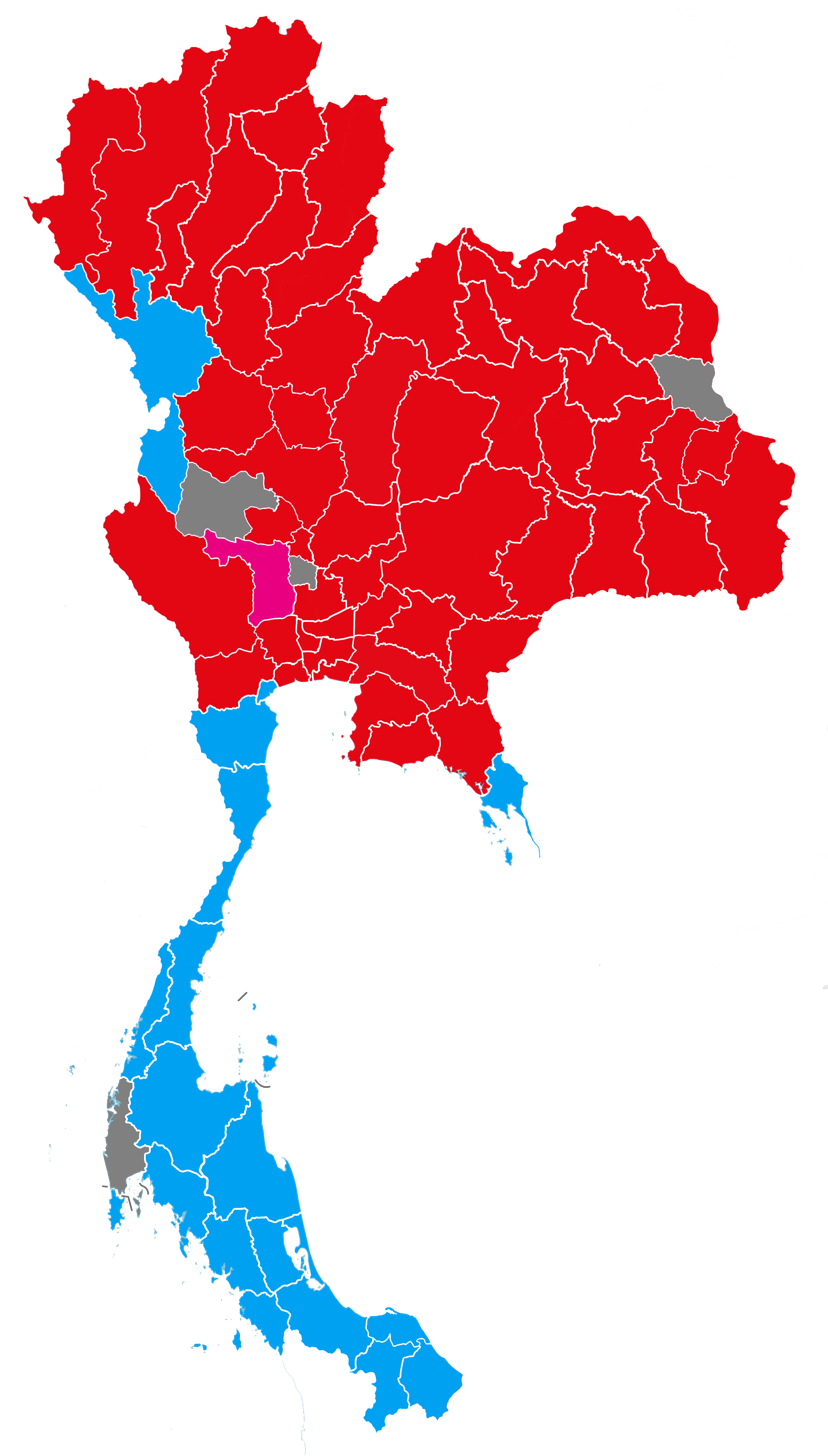
- Parties that won a majority of the seats in each province: Thai Rak Thai; Democrat; Chart Thai; No majority
Prime Minister before election
Thaksin Shinawatra
Thai Rak Thai
Prime Minister-designate
Thaksin Shinawatra
Thai Rak Thai

General elections were held in Thailand on 6 February 2005. The result was a landslide victory for the Thai Rak Thai party of Prime Minister Thaksin Shinawatra, which won 377 of the 500 seats in the House of Representatives, with its former coalition partner, the Chart Thai Party taking 25 seats. The opposition Democrat Party of Thailand won only 96 seats and the newly formed Mahachon Party took two seats.

== Background ==
Following the 2001 general elections, the New Aspiration Party merged into Thai Rak Thai, although it was later re-established by Chingchai Mongkoltham. The National Development Party (Thailand) and Seritham Party also merged with Thai Rak Thai Party.

== Electoral system ==
At the time of the elections the House of Representatives consisted of 400 members elected from single-member constituencies and 100 members elected from national party lists on a proportional basis.

== Campaign ==
=== Democrat Party ===
Democrat Party poster highlighting the "201" campaign

The Democrat Party led by Banyat Bantadtan did not seriously expect to defeat the coalition of the other two parties, but hoped to win 200 seats, which would have been a gain of 70 seats. However, intra-party conflicts between Banyat's southern faction and the Bangkok faction led by Abhisit Vejjajiva made this goal appear even less realistic. The Democrats also developed a populist agenda, promising more jobs, free education and health care, and combating crime and corruption. However, the party refused to give details of their policies.

The TRT's landslide victory cast doubt over the future of both party leaders, and Banyat resigned as Democrat Party leader immediately after the election. Abhisit Vejjajiva, Banyat's successor, said: "It will take a long time to revive the party because we need to look four years ahead and consider how to stay in the hearts of the people."

=== Thai Rak Thai ===
The Thai Rak Thai party was seeking to win an absolute majority in its own right, something no political party had ever achieved in Thailand at a genuinely free election. A coalition of other parties and civil society groups was formed to prevent this, arguing that Thaksin already had too much power and that giving him an absolute parliamentary majority would encourage what they alleged were his authoritarian tendencies. Prominent academic Kasem Sirisamphan, for example, accused Thaksin of running a "parliamentary dictatorship" and said that "people do not want a billionaire prime minister to further dominate the country and its politics."

Thaksin's party replied that it had provided Thailand with a stable, competent and corruption-free government, although critics said that corruption has actually increased under Thaksin's watch. Party spokesperson Suranand Vejjajiva said that Thais Love Thais was "the first party which could translate its populist policies into action. Its achievements and Mr Thaksin's vision give the party a clear edge and it will win an absolute majority," he said.

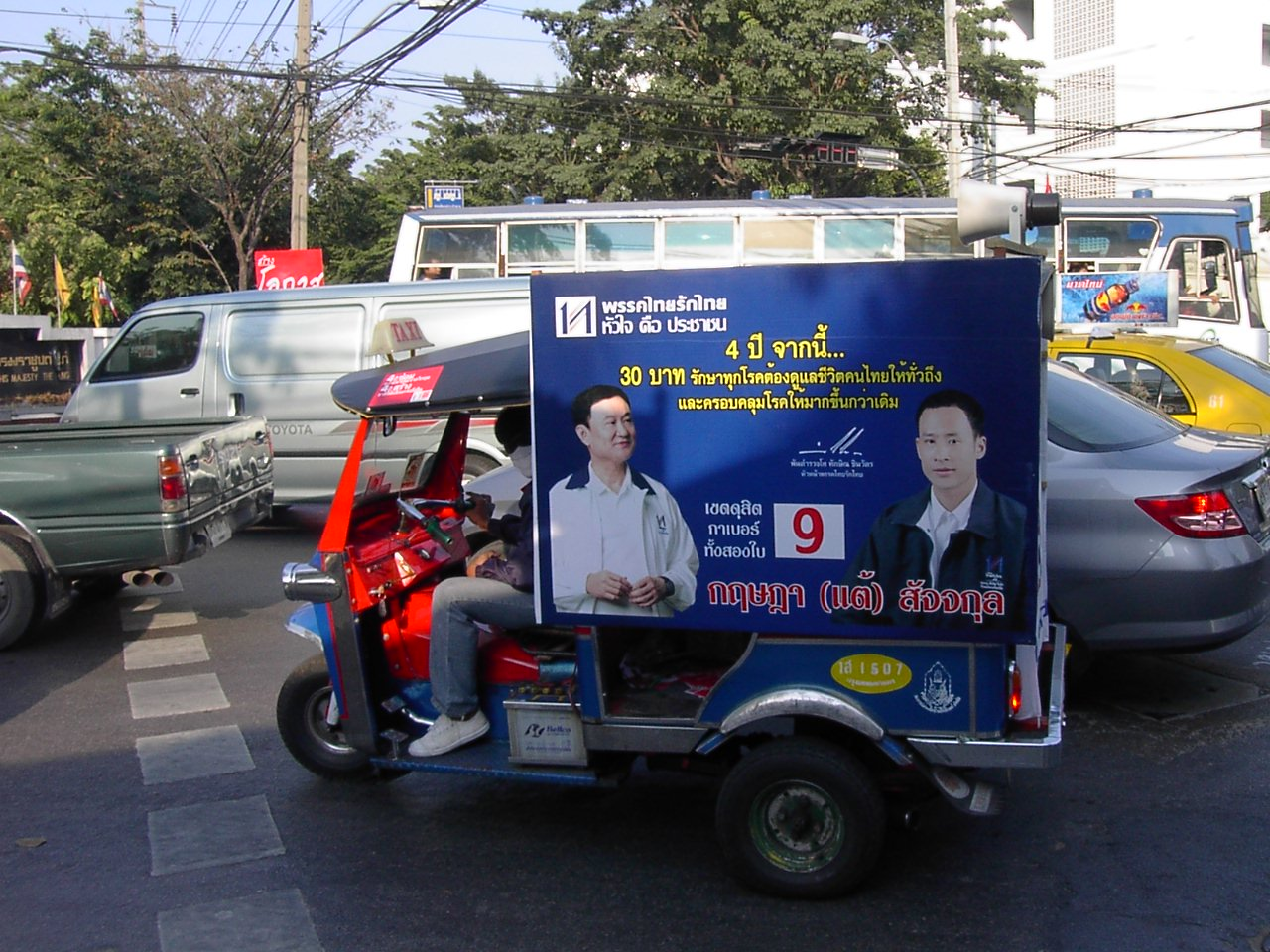
Promotion for Thaksin Shinawatra and his party on a Bangkok tuk-tuk (taxi)

Thai politics tend to be regionally based. Thai Rak Thai is strongest in the north-east region (Isan), the poorest and most populated part of the country, where Thaksin's populist policies are most popular. TRT is also dominant in the north, since Thaksin was born in Chiang Mai and has directed much government spending to his home region. Thai Rak Thai is strong in the Chao Phraya valley as well, although the region has historically been a stronghold of Chart Thai, which still dominates in some of the central provinces. Voters in Bangkok, the wealthiest part of the country, are less predictable, but steady economic growth, goal-oriented campaign agendas like "Healthy Bangkok" and "10 new MRT lines across the capital", and the publicity Thaksin received after the 2004 Indian Ocean earthquake was enough to swing the allegiance of the capital's middle-class to TRT. The Democrats are strongest in the south, but are popular among liberal-minded voters in Bangkok.

During 2004 most observers suggested that Thaksin's popularity had declined since its peak in 2003, and that he was unlikely to achieve an absolute majority for his own party. The deaths of Muslim protesters in southern Thailand and the bird flu outbreak were seen as issues which the Thaksin government had handled poorly.

=== Tsunami effects ===
These calculations were upset by the disaster of the 2004 Indian Ocean earthquake, which devastated six southern coastal provinces. The tsunami and its aftermath drove the election campaign to a large extent out of the media, and also produced a strong sense of national solidarity, from both of which an incumbent government could be expected to benefit. Most commentators praised the Thaksin government's response to the disaster. Political commentator Veera Prateepchaikul, who identified himself as an opponent of Thaksin, wrote in the Bangkok Post on 10 January: "Mr Thaksin deserves credit for his quick response to the disaster, his decisive leadership and his skills in crisis management."

Veera also pointed out that the provinces directly affected by the tsunami were part of the Democrat Party's southern stronghold, and that Thaksin's high profile, particularly on state television, in delivering aid to the area might improve his party's chances of winning more seats in the south. "The Democrats might cry foul that Mr Thaksin is using the state media for campaign purposes," Veera wrote, "but the people may think otherwise." Only a miracle, he wrote, could turn the "tsunami tide which is now clearly in favour of Mr Thaksin." In the event the Democrats retained their dominance in southern Thailand, winning 50 of the 52 southern seats for which figures are available.

== Pre-election predictions ==
Given such increased expectations, a failure by Thai Rak Thai to win 250 seats would have been seen as a considerable setback for Thaksin. The Bangkok newspaper The Nation published predictions by its reporters on 8 January, predicting that of the 400 constituency seats, Thai Rak Thai would win 233, the Democrats 94, Chart Thai 47 and Great People 26. If the parties achieved similar results in the 100 proportionate seats, this would have given Thais Love Thais about 290 seats overall and the Democrats about 120 seats. This proved to be a considerable underestimate of the scale of Thaksin's victory.

== Results ==
Thaksin's party dominated most of Thailand's regions. In Bangkok it won 32 seats to the Democrats' four and Chart Thai's one. In the Central region it won 79 seats to 10 for Chart Thai and eight for the Democrats. In the North, it won 71 seats to the Democrats' five. In the North-East (Isan) region, it won a massive 126 seats, to the Chart Thai's six, with two each going to the Democrats' and the Mahachon Party. Only in the South was the landslide resisted. Democrats won 52 seats in their traditional stronghold, while Chart Thai and Thai Rak Thai won only one seat each. Of the 100 seats elected by proportional representation, Thais Love Thais won 67, to the Democrats' 26 and Chart Thai's seven.

Thaksin said he would now form a one-party administration, ending his uneasy coalition with Chart Thai. The Bangkok newspaper The Nation said that Thaksin "has apparently won the strongest popular re-endorsement in Thai political history and is set to be the most powerful prime minister ever elected to lead the Kingdom." Thaksin is the first democratically elected Prime Minister of Thailand to complete a full four-year term in office and the first to win an absolute majority in the House in a relatively free election.

The day after the election, Thaksin said he would "work harder and faster to implement policies and resolve the country's problems." He said the government would "quickly boost Thailand's competitiveness in the international market, and would also look into improving religious affairs issues." This was taken as a reference to the situation in the south of the country, which has a large Muslim population, where there has been a history of unrest and disturbances, and where Thaksin's party won only one seat. The Nation newspaper reported: "Many voters [in the south] said they had lost faith in Thaksin, who has refused to apologise for incidents such as the deaths of 78 Muslims in October who were held in military custody after being arrested for protesting in the village of Tak Bai."

Party	Party-list			Constituency			Total seats	+/–
Party	Votes	%	Seats	Votes	%	Seats	Total seats	+/–
Thai Rak Thai Party	18,993,073	60.48	67	16,523,344	54.35	310	377	+129
Democrat Party	7,210,742	22.96	26	7,401,631	24.35	70	96	–32
Thai Nation Party	2,061,559	6.56	7	3,119,473	10.26	18	25	–16
Mahachon Party	1,346,631	4.29	0	2,223,399	7.31	2	2	0
Farmer Power Party	298,517	0.95	0	1,022	0.00	0	0	0
Debt Relief Party	293,487	0.93	0	166,651	0.55	0	0	New
Labour Party	162,225	0.52	0	1,245	0.00	0	0	0
National Democratic Party	100,203	0.32	0	9,952	0.03	0	0	0
New Aspiration Party	88,951	0.28	0	133,935	0.44	0	0	–36
Phaendin Thai	82,608	0.26	0	2,247	0.01	0	0	New
National Development Party	72,690	0.23	0	176	0.00	0	0	0
Prachachon Thai	61,540	0.20	0	29,550	0.10	0	0	New
Social Action Party	58,721	0.19	0	22,144	0.07	0	0	–1
Thai Help Thai	50,127	0.16	0	618	0.00	0	0	New
Thai Citizen Party	38,324	0.12	0	7,023	0.02	0	0	0
Thai Natural Party	37,916	0.12	0	2,694	0.01	0	0	New
People's Power Party	26,855	0.09	0				–	0
Rak Thin Thai	26,585	0.08	0	2,538	0.01	0	0	New
Kasikorn Thai Party	24,232	0.08	0	6,703	0.02	0	0	New
Third Choice Party	13,237	0.04	0	900	0.00	0	0	New
Krit Thai Kong Party				2,471	0.01	0	0	New
Blank votes	357,515	1.14	–	741,276	2.44	–	–	–
Total	31,405,738	100.00	100	30,398,992	100.00	400	500	0
Valid votes	31,405,738	97.11		30,398,992	94.01			
Invalid votes	935,586	2.89		1,938,590	5.99			
Total votes	32,341,324	100.00		32,337,582	100.00			
Registered voters/turnout	44,572,101	72.56		44,572,101	72.55			
Source: Election Commission

=== By province ===
Province	Total seats	Seats won			
Province	Total seats	Thai Rak Thai	Democrat	Thai Nation	Mahachon
Amnat Charoen	2	2			
Ang Thong	2	1		1	
Bangkok	37	32	4	1	
Buriram	10	10			
Chachoengsao	4	4			
Chai Nat	2	2			
Chaiyaphum	7	7			
Chanthaburi	3	3			
Chiang Mai	10	10			
Chiang Rai	8	8			
Chonburi	7	7			
Chumphon	3		3		
Kalasin	6	6			
Kamphaeng Phet	5	5			
Kanchanaburi	5	5			
Khon Kaen	11	11			
Krabi	2		2		
Lampang	5	5			
Lamphun	3	3			
Loei	4	4			
Lopburi	5	5			
Mae Hong Son	2	2			
Maha Sarakham	6	6			
Mukdahan	2	1		1	
Nakhon Nayok	2	2			
Nakhon Pathom	5	4		1	
Nakhon Phanom	5	5			
Nakhon Ratchasima	16	15			1
Nakhon Sawan	7	7			
Nakhon Si Thammarat	10		10		
Nan	3	3			
Narathiwat	4		3	1	
Nong Bua Lamphu	3	3			
Nong Khai	6	6			
Nonthaburi	6	6			
Pathum Thani	5	4		1	
Pattani	4		4		
Phang Nga	2	1	1		
Phatthalung	3		3		
Phayao	3	3			
Phetchabun	7	7			
Phetchaburi	3	1	2		
Phichit	4	3	1		
Phitsanulok	6	4	2		
Phra Nakhon Si Ayutthaya	5	5			
Phrae	3	3			
Phuket	2		2		
Prachinburi	3	3			
Prachuap Khiri Khan	3		3		
Ranong	1		1		
Ratchaburi	5	5			
Rayong	4	4			
Roi Et	8	6		2	
Sa Kaeo	3	3			
Sakon Nakhon	7	7			
Samut Prakan	7	7			
Samut Sakhon	3	3			
Samut Songkhram	1		1		
Saraburi	4	4			
Satun	2		2		
Sing Buri	1	1			
Sisaket	9	8		1	
Songkhla	8		8		
Sukhothai	4	4			
Suphan Buri	6			6	
Surat Thani	6		6		
Surin	9	8		1	
Tak	3	1	2		
Trang	4		4		
Trat	1		1		
Ubon Ratchathani	11	7	2	1	1
Udon Thani	10	10			
Uthai Thani	2	1		1	
Uttaradit	3	3			
Yala	3		3		
Yasothon	4	4			
Partylist	100	67	26	7	
Total	500	377	96	25	2

== Literature ==
- Chambers, Paul (2006), "Consolidation of Thaksinocracy and Crisis of Democracy: Thailand's 2005 General Election", Between Consolidation and Crisis: Elections and Democracy in Five Nations in Southeast Asia, Berlin: Lit, pp. 277–328
