= Charoen Khanthawong =

Thai politician (1933–2022)

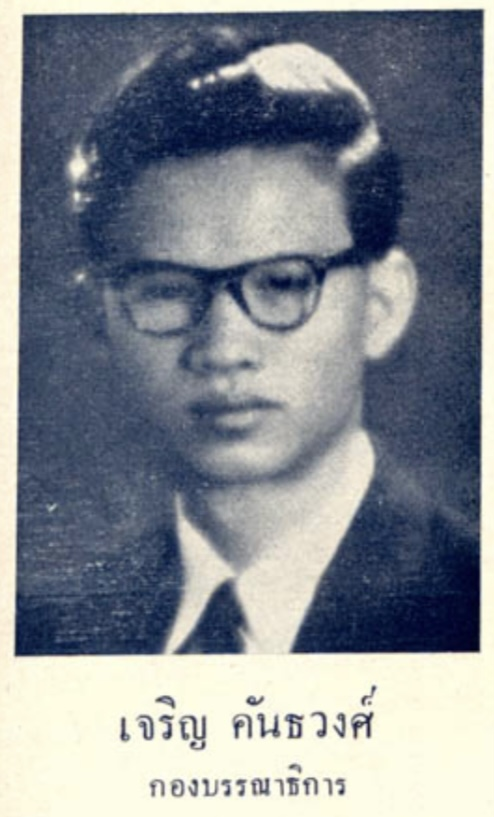

Minister of Science and Technology
- In office 22 November 1990 – 9 December 1990
- Preceded by: Prachuab Chaiyasan
- Succeeded by: Anuwat Wattanapongsiri

Member of the House of Representatives of Thailand
- In office 1975–2014

Personal details
- Born: 21 April 1933; Ko Kha district, Thailand
- Died: 4 May 2022 (aged 89)
- Political party: Democrat Party
- Education: Assumption College; Chulalongkorn University

Charoen Khanthawong (Thai: เจริญ คันธวงศ์; 21 April 1933 – 4 May 2022) was a Thai politician. A member of the Democrat Party, he served in the House of Representatives from 1975 to 2014. He died on 4 May 2022 at the age of 89.
