= Progressive Party (Thailand) =

Defunct royalist political party in Thailand

Progressive Party พรรคก้าวหน้า
- Founder: Kukrit Pramoj
- Founded: 22 March 1945
- Dissolved: 6 April 1946
- Merged into: Democrat Party
- Headquarters: Bangkok, Thailand
- Ideology: Royalism; Liberalism

The Progressive Party or Progress Party (Thai: พรรคก้าวหน้า; RTGS: Phak Kao Na) was the first political party (in the modern sense) in Thailand. It was formed by royalists and was active from 1945 to 1946 before it merged into the Democrat Party.

== History ==
The Progressive Party was founded in 1945 by Kukrit Pramoj along with Suwitt Pansed, Sor Sethabud, Boontheng Thongsawat. The founders were opposed to the Khana Ratsadon ("People's Party") that had ruled the country since the Siamese revolution of 1932. Many royalist intellectuals, former political prisoners and veterans of the 1933 Boworadet rebellion joined the party. In 1946, the Progressive Party merged into the Democrat Party.

== See also ==
- List of political parties in Thailand
