= Abhisit Vejjajiva =

Prime Minister of Thailand from 2008 to 2011

Abhisit Vejjajiva MPCh MWM
- อภิสิทธิ์ เวชชาชีวะ
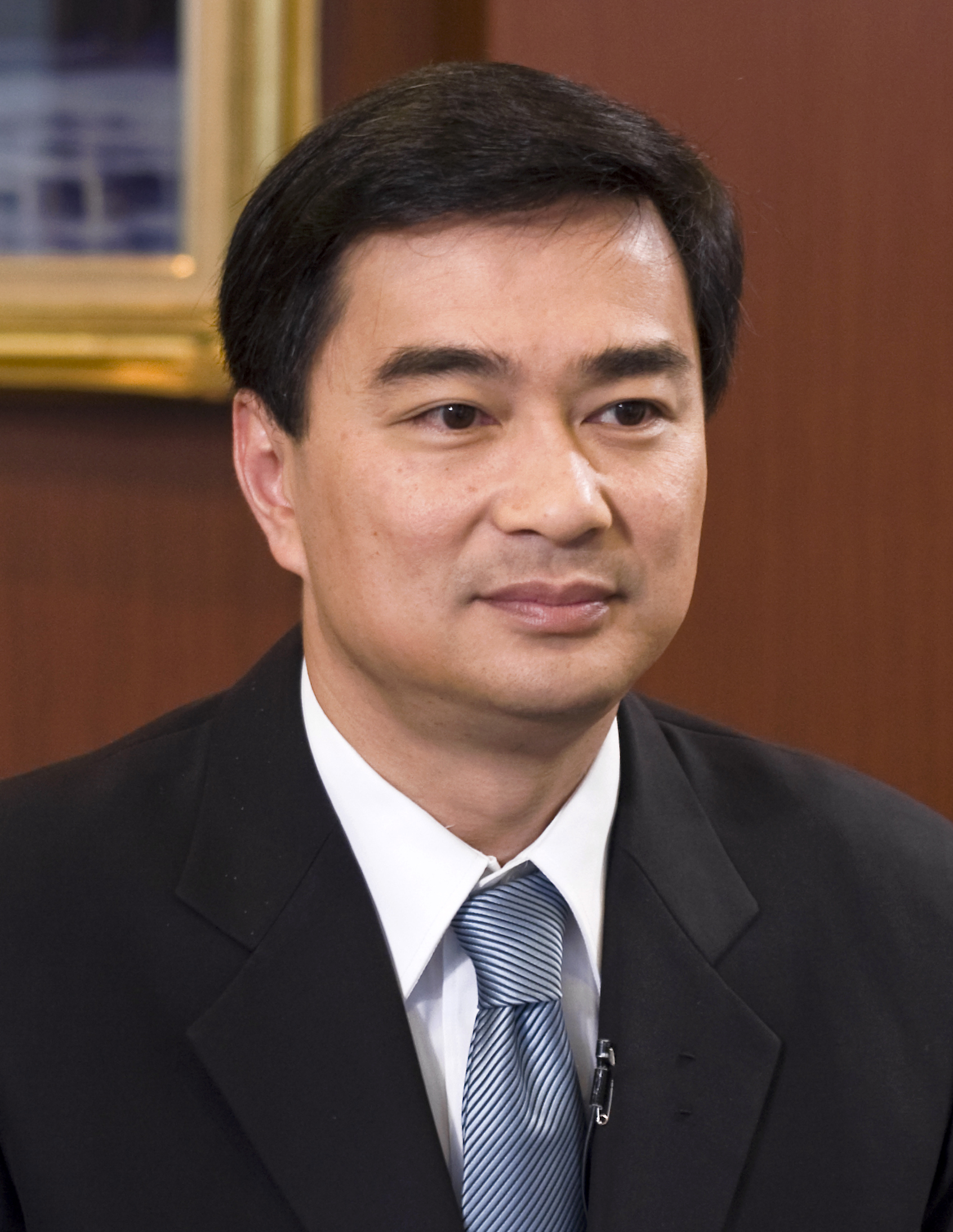
- Abhisit in 2010

27th Prime Minister of Thailand
- In office 17 December 2008 – 5 August 2011
- Monarch: Bhumibol Adulyadej
- Deputy: See list: Kobsak Sabhavasu; Trairong Suwankiri; Suthep Thaugsuban; Sanan Kachornprasart
- Preceded by: Somchai Wongsawat; Chavarat Charnvirakul (acting)
- Succeeded by: Yingluck Shinawatra

Minister to the Office of the Prime Minister
- In office 14 November 1997 – 17 February 2001
- Prime Minister: Chuan Leekpai
- Preceded by: Phusana Preemanoj; Sampan Lertnuwat; Phitak Intarawitayanan
- Succeeded by: Chaturon Chaisang; Somsak Thepsuthin; Krasae Chanawongse

Leader of the Opposition
- In office 16 September 2011 – 8 December 2013
- Prime Minister: Yingluck Shinawatra
- Preceded by: Himself (2008)
- Succeeded by: Sompong Amornwiwat (2019)
- In office 23 April 2005 – 17 December 2008
- Prime Minister: Thaksin Shinawatra; Samak Sundaravej; Somchai Wongsawat
- Preceded by: Banyat Bantadtan
- Succeeded by: Himself (2011)

Leader of the Democrat Party
- Incumbent
- Assumed office 18 October 2025
- Preceded by: Chalermchai Sri-on; Pramual Pongthavaradet (acting)
- In office 6 March 2005 – 24 March 2019
- Preceded by: Banyat Bantadtan
- Succeeded by: Jurin Laksanawisit

Member of the House of Representatives
- Incumbent
- Assumed office 8 February 2026
- Constituency: Party-list
- In office 6 January 2001 – 5 June 2019
- Constituency: Party-list (2001–2006; 2011–2019); Party-list area 6 (2007–2011)
- In office 22 March 1992 – 9 November 2000
- Preceded by: Bhichai Rattakul
- Succeeded by: Charoen Khanthawong
- Constituency: Bangkok 5th District (1992–1996); Bangkok 6th District (1996–2000)

Personal details
- Born: Mark Abhisit Vejjajiva; 3 August 1964 (age 62) Newcastle upon Tyne, England, United Kingdom
- Citizenship: United Kingdom; Thailand
- Party: Democrat (1992–2023; since 2025)
- Spouse: Pimpen Vejjajiva
- Children: 2
- Education: St John's College, Oxford; Ramkhamhaeng University

Abhisit Vejjajiva MPCh MWM (Thai: อภิสิทธิ์ เวชชาชีวะ, RTGS: Aphisit Wetchachiwa, Thai pronunciation: [ʔà.pʰí.sìt wêːt.tɕʰāː.tɕʰīː.wáʔ]; born 3 August 1964) is a Thai politician who was the 27th prime minister of Thailand from 2008 to 2011. He was the leader of the Democrat Party from 2005 until he resigned following the party's weak performance in the 2019 election. He returned as leader of the party once again in October 2025, following party elections. As leader of the second largest party in the House of Representatives, he was also leader of the opposition – a position he held from 2005 to 2008 and again after his premiership until his party's en masse resignation from the House on 8 December 2013.

Born in England to Thai Chinese father, prof. Atthasit, and Siamese mother, Sodsai, Abhisit also holds British citizenship. He attended Eton College and earned bachelor's and master's degrees from the University of Oxford. After his graduation he taught as an economics lecturer at Chulachomklao Royal Military Academy and Thammasat University. Abhisit was elected to the Thai House of Representatives at the age of 27 and served as minister to the Office of the Prime Minister under Chuan Leekpai from 1997 to 2001. He narrowly lost the 2003 Democrat Party leadership election, but unopposedly became the party's chairman two years later following the Democrats' defeat in the 2005 general election.

Abhisit was appointed prime minister of Thailand on 17 December 2008, after the Constitutional Court of Thailand removed Prime Minister Somchai Wongsawat from office. At age 44, he was the country's youngest prime minister in more than 60 years.

Abhisit became premier during the Great Recession and rising domestic political tensions. As prime minister, he promoted a "People's Agenda", which focused primarily on policies affecting the living conditions of Thailand's rural and working class citizens. He administered two economic stimulus packages: a US$40 billion, three-year infrastructure improvement plan, and a more than US$3 billion program of cash subsidies and handouts. By 2010, the stock market and the value of the baht had rebounded to their highest levels since the 1997 Asian financial crisis. Human Rights Watch called Vejjajiva "the most prolific censor in recent Thai history" and Freedom House downgraded Thailand's rating of media freedom to "not free". Abhisit also advocated for stronger anti-corruption measures, although several members of his Cabinet resigned due to corruption scandals and parts of his economic stimulus packages were criticised for instances of alleged corruption.

Abhisit's government faced major protests in April 2009 and April–May 2010. The military's crackdowns on protesters left at least 91 dead. Abhisit launched a reconciliation plan to investigate the crackdown, but the work of the investigation commission was hampered by military and government agencies. The Thai Army clashed with Cambodian troops numerous times from 2009 to 2010 in the bloodiest fighting in over two decades. The South Thailand insurgency escalated during Abhisit's government, and reports of torture and human rights violations increased.

Having resigned the party leadership after the defeat the Democrats suffered in the parliamentary elections of 2011, Abhisit was re-elected as leader at a party assembly.

In 2018, the Democrats held a contest for party leader in preparation for the upcoming election. Abhisit was re-elected party leader, beating former PDRC leader, Warong Dechgitvigrom, by approximately 10,000 votes. However, after a poor showing in the 2019 election, Abhisit resigned as party leader.

== Early life and family ==
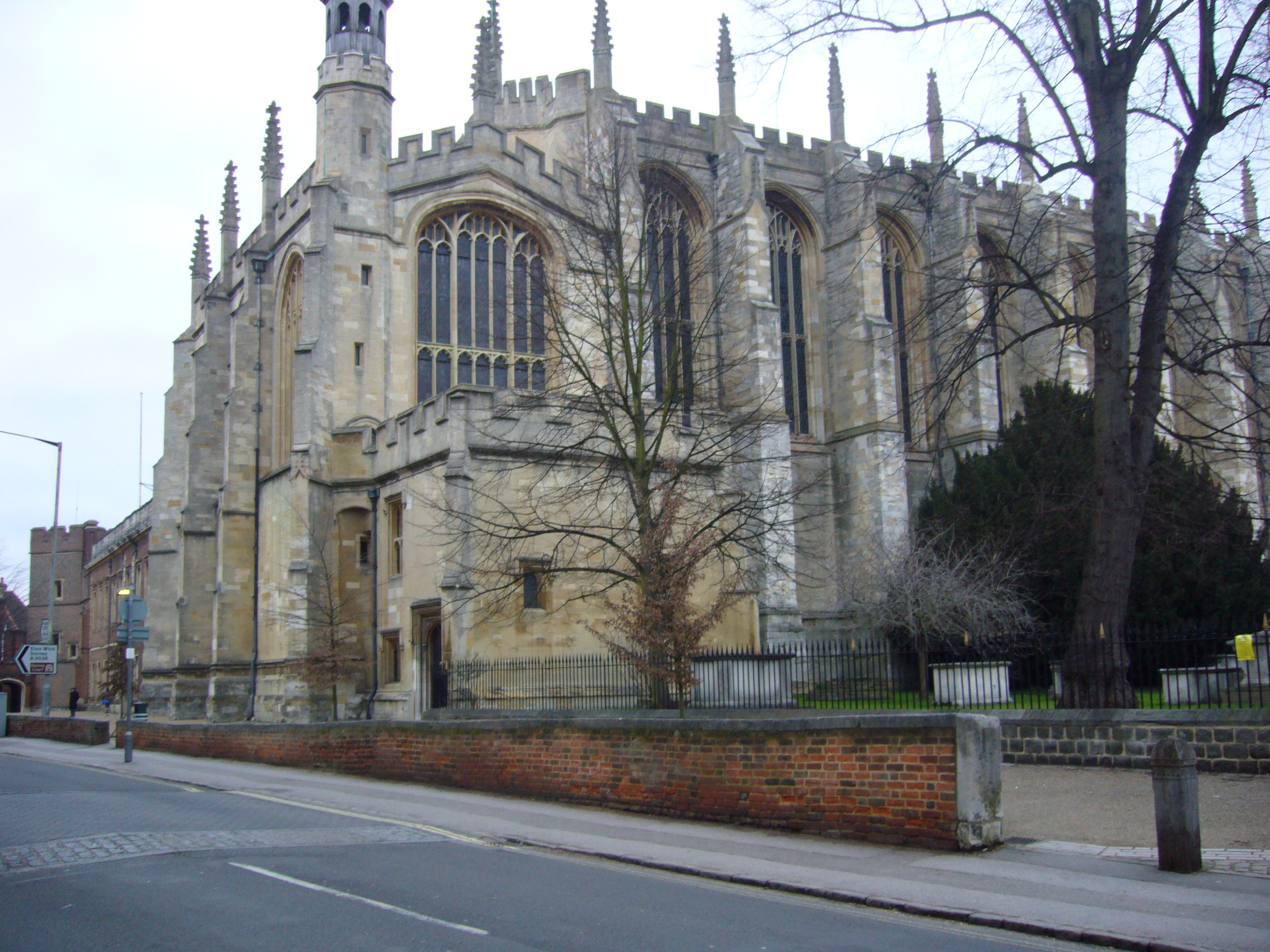
Eton College

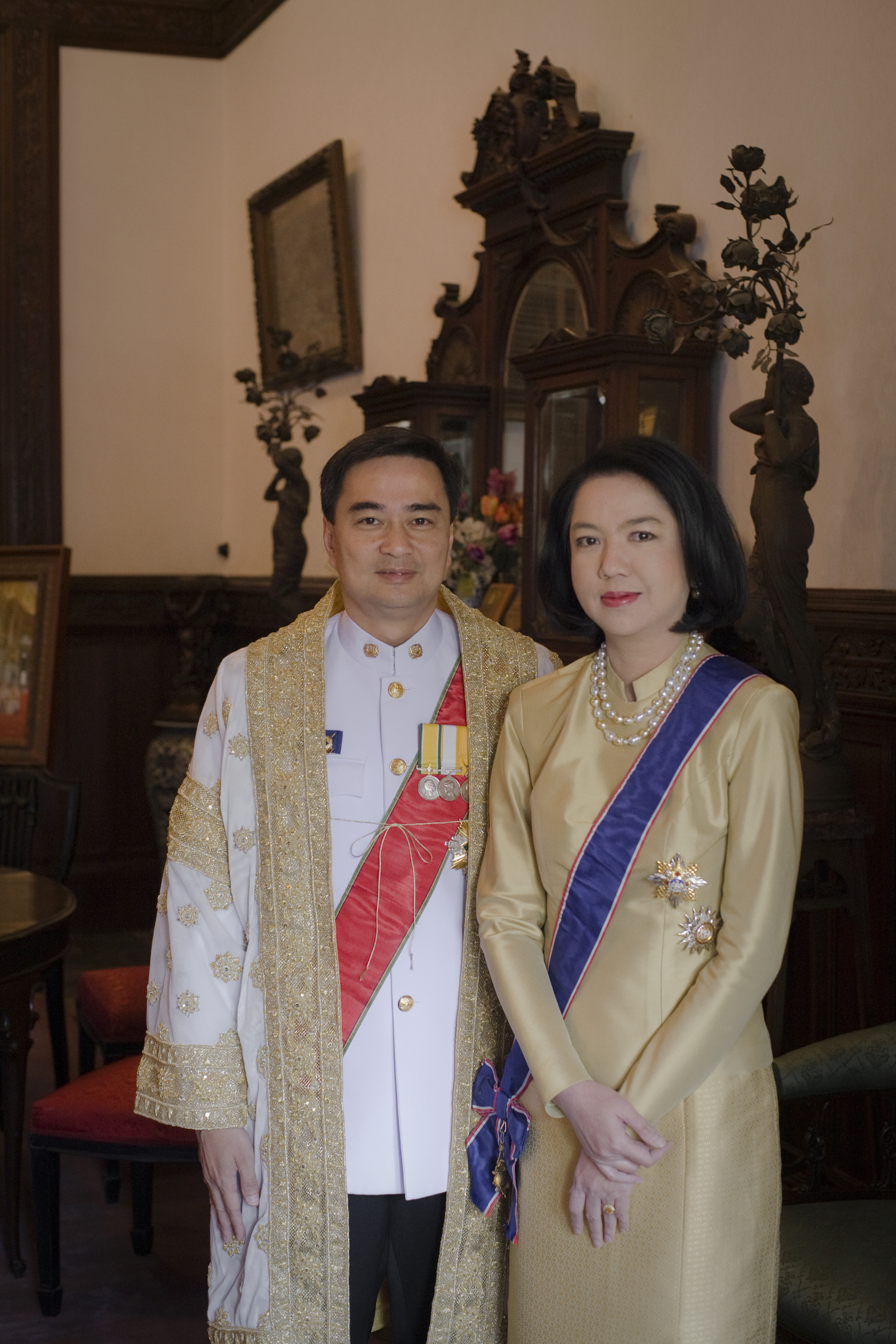
Abhisit Vejjajiva, wearing prime ministerial attire, including the golden brocaded Senamat gown (ครุยเสนามาตย์), and his wife, Dr Pimpen, wearing a Thai silk dress

Mark Abhisit Vejjajiva was born to ethnic Chinese parents in Princess Mary Maternity Hospital, Newcastle upon Tyne, England, United Kingdom. He attended Chulalongkorn University Demonstration School as a child. He studied in England from the age of eleven, where he attended prep school at Scaitcliffe and then Eton College. Abhisit earned a first-class honours bachelor's degree in philosophy, politics and economics (PPE), and a master's degree in economics from St John's College, Oxford. While studying in England, he went to Thailand several times, including a gap year trip in 1983 with classmate and future UK Prime Minister Boris Johnson to the hill resort city of Chiang Mai and the tourist island of Phuket.

After moving to Thailand, he received a bachelor's degree in law from Thailand's Ramkhamhaeng University, and taught at Chulachomklao Royal Military Academy and Thammasat University Faculty of Economics. He is fluent in both his mother tongue and English also having both dual Thai and British citizenship. His dual citizenship became a topic for the Thai parliamentary debates in early-2011. He is of Chinese descent and a seventh generation overseas Hakka with ancestry in China's Guangdong province, but his family's domicile of origin is in Chanthaburi province which is located in the country's eastern side near to the border with Cambodia, since his father is a sixth-generation local-born Chinese.

Abhisit is married to Pimpen Sakuntabhai, his classmate at the Chulalongkorn University Demonstration elementary school, who is a former dentist and is now a lecturer at the Department of Mathematics at Chulalongkorn University. They have two children: Prang Vejjajiva (daughter) and Pannasit Vejjajiva (son). Pannasit has had autism since birth. After his majority, the Central Juvenile and Family Court adjudged him quasi-incompetent and placed him under the guardianship of Abhisit, his father, as from 3 September 2012.

Abhisit also has two sisters: child psychiatrist Alisa Wacharasindhu and author Ngarmpun Vejjajiva. One of Abhisit's first cousins, Suranand Vejjajiva was a cabinet minister under Thaksin's Thai Rak Thai party and served as the Prime Minister's Secretary General under Yingluck Shinawatra. Suranand's father, Nissai Vejjajiva served as the ambassador to various countries between the 1960s to 1980s and is the older brother of Abhisit's father, Athasit.

== Background ==
Abhisit's ethnic Chinese ancestors were surnamed Yuan (袁) and arrived in Thailand from China via Vietnam, and were settled in the province of Chanthaburi after arriving in the kingdom. The family name Vejjajiva was granted by King Rama VI to Abhisit's grandfather Dr. Long (หลง), together with Long's father Jinsang (จิ๊นแสง), grandfather Peng (เป๋ง) and great-grandfather Go (ก่อ), while Dr. Long was serving as an Army Medical Department sub-lieutenant. (รองอำมาตย์ตรี)

Abhisit has a nephew, Parit Wacharasindhu, who is the incumbent spokesperson of the People's Party, a progressive party in Thailand.

The Vejjajiva family came to prominence when Dr. Long, then styled Phra Bamrad Naradura, rose to public health minister and founded the Bamrad Naradura Hospital in Nonthaburi. The family name means "medical profession".

Abhisit's father, Athasit (อรรถสิทธิ์) Vejjajiva, is a former president of Mahidol University and a member of the Royal Institute of Thailand. After the National Peace Keeping Council seized power in a military coup in 1991, the military junta appointed Abhisit's father Deputy Minister of Public Health.

== Early political career ==
=== Entry into politics ===
Abhisit began his political career in the 1992 general elections that followed the coup, becoming a Bangkok MP for the Democrat Party. He was re-elected to the same seat in the 1995 and 1996 general elections. In the elections of 2001 and 2005, he returned to parliament as a Party List MP for the Democrat Party. He has served as Democrat Party spokesman, Government spokesman, Prime Minister's Deputy-Secretary General for Political Affairs, Chairman of the House Education Affairs Committee, and Minister to the Prime Minister's Office.

=== Education Reform ===
During his administration as Minister to the Prime Minister's Office, he was responsible for the national education act of 1999.

=== Democrat Party leader ===
Abhisit was first nominated for the position of Democrat Party leader in 2003, following the resignation of then-party leader and former-Prime Minister Chuan Leekpai. However, he lost the bid in a close election with seasoned politician Banyat Bantadtan. Two years later, Banyat led the Democrat Party to an overwhelming defeat in the 2005 general elections. Banyat resigned following the elections and Abhisit was named the new party leader.

==== 2006 elections ====
In February 2006, then-Prime Minister Thaksin Shinawatra dissolved the House of Representatives and called for new elections in April. In response, Abhisit announced that the Democrats and other opposition parties would boycott the elections. They claimed the elections lacked legitimacy, and were an attempt by Thaksin to divert public attention from his tax free sales of the Shin Corporation to Temasek Holdings.

Thaksin's Thai Rak Thai Party won an overwhelming majority in the virtually uncontested April 2006 election. However, the elections also left 38 seats vacant in the House of Representatives, because some Thai Rak Thai candidates were unable to garner the constitutionally required minimum of 20% of the vote to hold office. In the ensuing political crisis, Thaksin announced he would step down as Prime Minister, and the Constitutional Court ultimately invalidated the election results.

The Thai Rak Thai party charged the Democrats with bribing other small political parties into boycotting the April 2006 elections. An 11-member fact-finding panel headed by Deputy Attorney-General Chaikasem Nitisiri voted unanimously in June 2006 to recommend dissolving the Democrat Party, as well as Thai Rak Thai and three other parties, based on evidence that the Democrats bribed other opposition parties into boycotting the elections. In February 2007, candidates from the Progressive Democratic Party testified before the Constitution Tribunal that they were duped into registering for candidacy in the April elections. Three witnesses testified that Democrat leaders Thaworn Senniam, Wirat Kalayasiri, and Jua Ratchasi encouraged protesters to disrupt the registration of candidates during the by-elections after the April 2006 election. Prosecutors contended that the party tried to disqualify the election results and force continuous rounds of by-elections. The defence claimed that the witnesses were hired by the Thai Rak Thai party to discredit the Democrats. Ultimately, the Constitutional Court of Thailand acquitted Abhisit and the Democrats of bribery, and instead banned Thaksin's Thai Rak Thai party for the same charges.

==== 2006 military coup ====
On 19 September 2006, only weeks before the scheduled elections, the military seized power in the 2006 Thailand coup. Abhisit voiced his disapproval of the coup just hours before all political activities were banned:

We cannot and do not support any kind of extra-constitutional change, but it is done. The country has to move forward and the best way forward is for the coup leaders to quickly return power to the people and carry out the reforms they promised. They have to prove themselves. I urge them to lift all restrictions as soon as possible. There is no need to write a brand new constitution. They could make changes to the 1997 constitution and if that's the case, there is no reason to take a year. Six months is a good time.

Abhisit and the Democrats supported the military junta's 2007 draft constitution on the grounds that rejecting it would give more power to the junta. Abhisit said the Democrat Party considered the new constitution similar to the 1997 constitution, but with improvements as well as faults. "If we wanted to please the Council for National Security we would reject the draft so it could pick a charter of its own choosing. If we reject the draft, it will be like handing out power to the Council. We have come up with this stand because we care about national interest and want democracy to be restored soon", he said. Abhisit said he would seek to amend the Constitution if he was named prime minister.

==== 2007 elections ====
The Democrat Party remained in the opposition after the December 2007 parliamentary election. In a parliamentary vote to select a new prime minister on 28 January 2008, Samak Sundaravej of the People's Power Party defeated Abhisit by a vote of 310 to 163. On 9 September 2008, Samak was removed from the post by the Constitutional Court for receiving payment as the host of a TV cooking program.

In the crisis that followed, some Democrat Party members became leaders of the People's Alliance for Democracy, which organised a six-month-long demonstration and seized Government House, Don Muang Airport, and Suvarnabhumi Airport. Abhisit voiced displeasure at the sieges, but did not stop his deputies from their leadership of the PAD. The sieges ended after the Constitutional Court banned the People's Power Party. Army commander and co-leader of the 2006 coup, General Anupong Paochinda, allegedly coerced several PPP MPs from the Friends of Newin Group to defect to the Democrat Party, allowing Abhisit to be elected Prime Minister.

Upon becoming Premiere, Abhisit promised to enforce the rule of law and prosecute the 21 People's Alliance for Democracy leaders who were responsible for seizing Don Muang and Suvarnabhumi Airport. As of February 2010, arrest warrants still had not been issued for the airport seizures. On 24 February 2010, government prosecutors deferred a decision for the eighth time to decide whether to indict the nine leaders of the PAD over the 7-month long seizure of the Government House. However, as the PAD leaders did not voluntarily come to testify, the judge could not make the decision and the process was thereby delayed.

== Rise to premiership ==
When Thaksin called for new elections in April 2006, Abhisit said he was "prepared to become a prime minister who adheres to the principles of good governance and ethics, not authoritarianism." On 29 April Abhisit announced his candidacy for prime minister at the Democrat Party annual convention. He promised a "People's Agenda", with education as the main focus. He used the campaign slogan "Putting People First". He also vowed not to privatise basic utilities such as water and electricity, and to nationalise state enterprises that Thaksin had privatised. Regarding core elements of the so-called "Thaksinomics", Abhisit promised "the benefits from certain populist policies, such as the 30-baht healthcare scheme, the Village Fund and the SML (Small Medium Large) scheme, will not be revoked but instead improved." He later urged that Thaksin's popular 30-baht health care scheme should be replaced with a system where access to medical services was totally free. Abhisit stated that all future Democrat MPs would have to declare their assets and any involvement in private companies. (By law, only members of the cabinet needed to declare their assets.)

Abhisit raised more than 200 million baht at the Democrat Party's 60th anniversary dinner. He outlined several energy policies, including increasing dividend payments from state-owned oil company PTT and using the funds to repay oil fund debts, and having state-owned electric utility EGAT absorb part of the rising fuel prices. Abhisit later outlined plans to reduce retail petrol prices by eliminating the 2.50 baht/litre tax used to maintain the government's oil fund.

On 13 July 2006, Abhisit promised to deal with escalating violence in the South by putting problems in the southern provinces on the public agenda.

Abhisit also promised many populist policies including providing free education, textbooks, milk, and supplemental foods for nursery school students, and increasing the minimum wage.

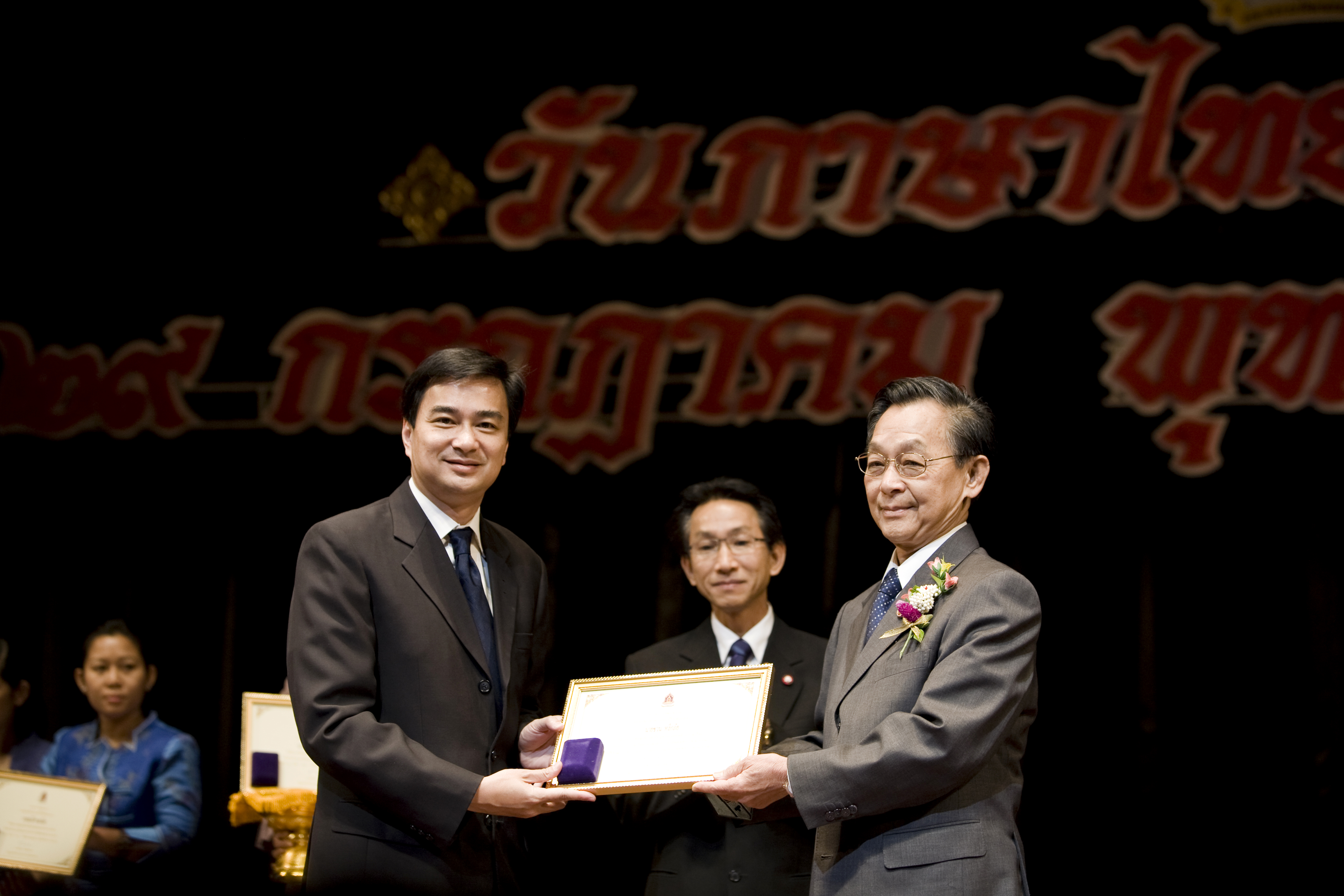
Abhisit with his political mentor Chuan Leekpai

Following the Constitutional Court of Thailand's removal of Prime Minister Samak Sundaravej in 2008 for vested interests by taking a salary from a cooking show while being prime minister, Abhisit lost the National Assembly vote for prime minister by 163 votes to 298 for Somchai Wongsawat, ex-PM Thaksin Shinawatra's brother-in-law. On 2 December 2008, the Constitutional Court banned the three government parties for electoral fraud, including the PPP, thus dissolving the governing coalition and paving the way for a Democrat-Party-led government. The court also removed Somchai from office and banned him from politics for five years due to his involvement in the scandal as one of PPP's executive board members. He was succeeded by a deputy.

After Somchai was removed and the PPP dissolved, the MPs of the parties which had been in coalition with the PPP forged a new coalition with the Democrat Party, which had been in opposition until then. Most of the defectors were MPs from the Friends of Newin faction of the PPP, as well as the Bhumjaithai Party, the Puea Pandin Party, the Chartthaipattana Party, and the Rum Chart Pattana Party. The defection of the powerful Friends of Newin Group came about due to the alleged coercion by Army Commander General Anupong Paochinda, a move that Senator Khamnoon Sitthisamarn called an "Anupong-style coup". The Democrat-led coalition was able to endorse Abhisit as Prime Minister. Abhisit became Prime Minister after winning a vote in parliament on 15 December 2008.

== Prime Minister of Thailand (2008–2011) ==
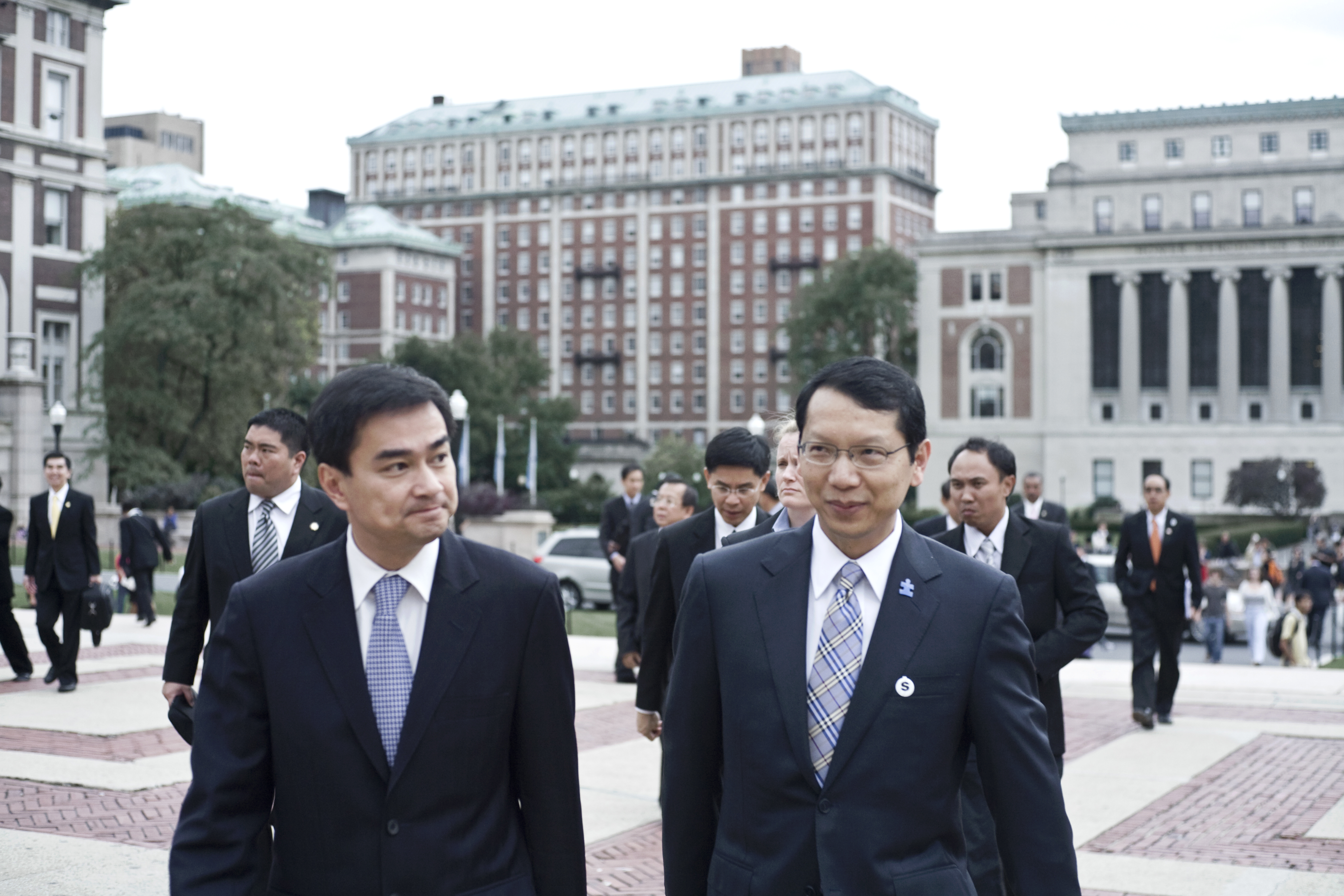
Abhisit at Columbia University after a meeting of the United Nations General Assembly, September 2009

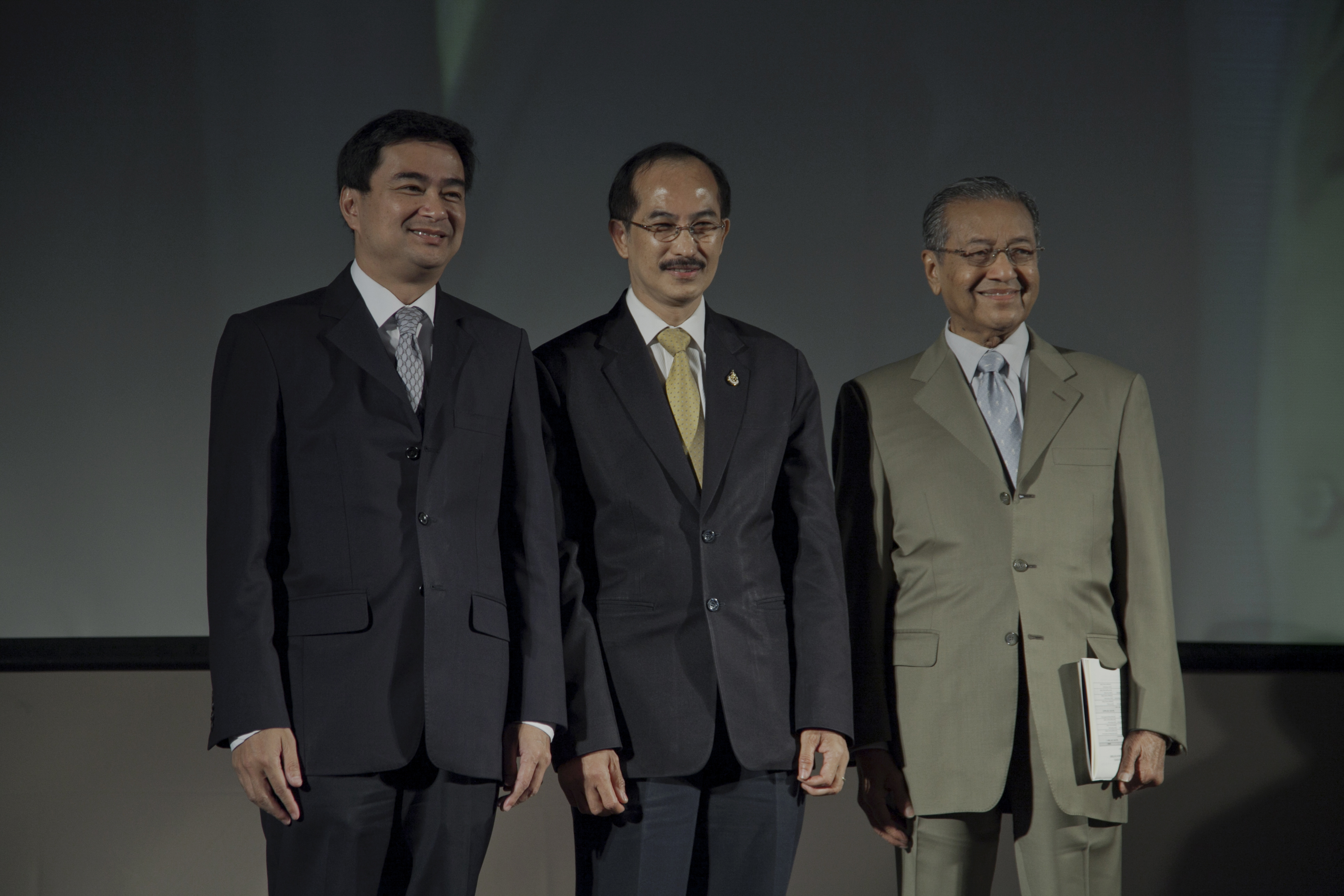
Abhisit and Malaysia's former premier Mahathir Mohamad, 7 September 2012

Abhisit was formally endorsed by King Bhumibol Adulyadej as Prime Minister on 17 December 2008. Key appointments in Abhisit's government included PAD leader Kasit Piromya as Foreign Minister, construction tycoon Chaovarat Chanweerakul as Interior Minister, and investment banker and former Abhisit classmate Korn Chatikavanij as Finance Minister. Massage parlor tycoon Pornthiva Nakasai was appointed Deputy Commerce Minister.

Abhisit's government saw unemployment increase by 63 percent. Thailand's government budget went into deficit for the first time since 2003. By 2010, the government's debt had bloomed and reached 4.8% of GDP, the largest budget deficit since the government of Chuan Leekpai. This was likely due to the decades of tense political situation in the country. To help the people, Abhisit subsidised the price of diesel, LPG cooking gas, and household electricity. Public bus and train journeys were provided for free.

Abhisit's information and communications technology (ICT) policy included increased censorship of Internet sites the government considered deemed offensive to the monarchy, cancellation of 3G 2.1 gigahertz spectrum licence auctions, and larger budgets for government-owned TOT.

== Post-premiership (2011–present) ==
Following the resignation of Chalermchai Sri-on as Democrat Party leader, Abhisit was reinstated as leader of the Democrat Party on 18 October 2025, winning 96% of votes in a party election.

== Wealth ==
Upon his appointment as prime minister in 2008, Abhisit officially declared personal assets worth 51.8 million baht (nearly US$2 million). This had increased to 54.4 million upon leaving office. Given that Abhisit has never worked in the private sector, the vast majority of his wealth was either inherited or given to him.

== Criticism ==
In his political career, Abhisit has been accused of hypocrisy. Prior to Abhisit's planned speech at St John's College on 14 March 2009, Lee Jones, a researcher on international relations at Oxford University, sent a letter to the dean of St John's College, attacking Abhisit and his administration as "democratic hypocrites". Part of the letter read "Although it is understandable given his education at St John's, I do not believe it is appropriate to ask someone like him to address the Oxford community on the subject of 'democracy'. As you may be aware, the Abhisit administration has only come to power in Thailand following a period of naked manipulation of Thai politics by cynical political elites, including the leadership of Abhisit's own 'Democrat' Party." Jones later clarified on his website that he had not intended to publicly attack the Thai PM and the event.

Abhisit refused to resign as prime minister after a clash between government troops and anti-government protesters on 10 April 2010 had claimed the lives of at least 23 people and injured hundreds more.

== Honours ==
=== Royal decorations ===
Abhisit has received the following royal decorations in the Honours System of Thailand:

- 1999 – Knight Grand Cordon (Special Class) of the Most Exalted Order of the White Elephant
- 1998 – Knight Grand Cordon (Special Class) of the Most Noble Order of the Crown of Thailand
- 2009 – Boy Scout Citation Medal (First Class)

=== Military rank ===
- Sub Lieutenant of The Royal Thai Army

=== Volunteer Defense Corps of Thailand rank ===
- Volunteer Defense Corps General

== See also ==
- Democrat Party (Thailand)

== Notes ==
Political offices
Vacant Title last held by Montri Jenwitkan	Government spokesperson 1992–1994	Succeeded by Akaphol Sornsuchat
Vacant Title last held by Pokin Palakul; Rakkiat Sukthana; Samphan Lertnuwat; Phusana Preemanoch; Phithak Intharawithayanan	Minister to the Office of the Prime Minister of Thailand; 1997–2001 with Supatra Masdit; Sawit Photivihok; Jurin Laksanawisit; Somboon Rahong; Chaiya Sasomsap; Phithak Intharawithayanan; Paveena Hongsakula; Pinyo Niroj; Adisai Potharamik	Vacant Title next held by Chaturon Chaisang; Somsak Thepsuthin; Krasae Chanawongse
Vacant Title last held by Banyat Bantadtan	Leader of the Opposition of Thailand; 2005–2006	Vacant Title next held by himself
Vacant Title last held by himself	Leader of the Opposition of Thailand; 2008	Vacant Title next held by himself
Vacant Chaovarat Chanweerakul (Acting) Title last held by Somchai Wongsawat	Prime Minister of Thailand; 2008–2011	Succeeded by Yingluck Shinawatra
Vacant Title last held by himself	Leader of the Opposition of Thailand; 2011–2013	Vacant Title next held by Sompong Amornwiwat
Assembly seats
Preceded by Bhichai Rattakul; Praphan Hutasingh; Charoen Khanthawong	Members of the House of Representatives for Bangkok, 6 District; 1992–1995 with Praphan Hutasingh; Rerkdee Chat-Uthit; Charoen Khanthawong; Somkiat Chanthawanit	Succeeded by Bhichai Rattakul; Charoen Khanthawong; Suthin Nophaket
Preceded by Udomsil Srisangnam; Art-ong Jumsai Na Ayudhya; Charoen Khanthawong	Members of the House of Representatives for Bangkok, 5 District; 1995–2000 with Suthin Nophaket; Sutham Sangprathum; Tharin Nimmanhemin; Phiraphan Saliratthawiphak	Succeeded by Prachuap Ungphakorn
Diplomatic posts
Preceded by Lee Hsien Loong	Chairperson of ASEAN; 2009	Succeeded by Nguyễn Minh Triết
Party political offices
Preceded by Banyat Bantadtan	Leader of Democrat Party; 2005–2019	Succeeded by Jurin Laksanawisit
