= Jurin Laksanawisit =

Thai politician (born 1956)

Jurin Laksanawisit MPCh WMW
- จุรินทร์ ลักษณวิศิษฏ์
- Jurin in 2023

Deputy Prime Minister of Thailand
- In office 10 July 2019 – 1 September 2023
- Prime Minister: Prayut Chan-o-cha

Minister of Commerce
- In office 10 July 2019 – 1 September 2023
- Prime Minister: Prayut Chan-o-cha
- Preceded by: Sontirat Sontijirawong
- Succeeded by: Phumtham Wechayachai

Leader of the Democrat Party
- In office 15 May 2019 – 14 November 2023; Acting from 14 May 2023
- Preceded by: Abhisit Vejjajiva
- Succeeded by: Chalermchai Sri-on

Minister of Public Health
- In office 15 January 2010 – 8 August 2011
- Prime Minister: Abhisit Vejjajiva
- Preceded by: Witthaya Kaewparadai
- Succeeded by: Witthaya Buranasiri

Minister of Education
- In office 20 December 2008 – 15 January 2010
- Prime Minister: Abhisit Vejjajiva
- Preceded by: Srimuang Chareonsiri
- Succeeded by: Chinnaworn Boonyakiat

Minister to the Office of the Prime Minister
- In office 14 November 1997 – 6 January 2001
- Prime Minister: Chuan Leekpai
- Preceded by: Sampan Lertnuwat; Phusana Preemanoch; Pitak Intrawityanunt
- Succeeded by: Chaturon Chaisang; Somsak Thepsuthin; Krasae Chanawongse

Member of the House of Representatives
- In office 6 January 2001 – 12 December 2025
- Constituency: Party-list
- In office 27 July 1986 – 9 November 2000
- Preceded by: Borom Tanthian
- Succeeded by: Jurit Laksanawisit
- Constituency: Phang Nga 1st District

Personal details
- Born: 15 March 1956 (age 70) Thai Mueang, Thailand
- Party: Democrat
- Spouse: Orn-anong Laksanawisit
- Education: Thammasat University; National Institute of Development Administration
- Occupation: Politician

Jurin Laksanawisit (Chinese: 林明利, Thai: จุรินทร์ ลักษณวิศิษฏ์, RTGS: Churin Laksanawisit; born 15 March 1956) is a Thai Democrat Party politician. He was former Minister of Public Health and Minister of Education during Abhisit Vejjajiva premiership along with member of the House of Representatives for eleven times.

== Early life and family ==
Jurin was born in Thai Mueang District, Phang Nga Province in Thai Chinese family background (not Peranakans). He began to study at the elementary level from Sirirat Wittaya School and continuing education at secondary level at Suankularb Wittayalai School, then Bachelor's degree at Faculty of Political Science, Thammasat University and master's degree for Public Administration from National Institute of Development Administration.

== Political career ==
In the government of Abhisit Vejjajiva, he received the position of Minister of Education in the 59th Council of Ministers, which from the public opinion poll by ABAC Poll regarding the government's performance in the past year, it was found that his work was 15 years of free education, with a score of 7.28 points from the full score of 10 it is considered a satisfactory level of government.

From the case of resignation of Wittaya Kaewpharadai, Minister of Public Health make the Democratic Party Executive Committee resolved to allow him moved to a position Minister of Public Health instead the results of the public opinion survey in 2010 also found that he received the highest satisfaction rating from the Minister in the government with a score of 6.02 from the full score of 10.

In 2019, he was elected leader of the Democrat Party, succeeding Abhisit Vejjajiva, who resigned following the party's poor performance in the 2019 Thai general election. He had previously been the deputy leader of the Democrat Party since 2003 for 16 years.

Jurin resigned as party leader after the 2023 general election, in which the Democrats again did poorly.

== Personal life ==
When he was a student he was a writer in political cartoon using the pen name "UDDA" is the nickname that is often referred to today. In addition, he also a writer with a works of travel books in the Matichon Publishing Group, named "UDDA, holding a pen to travel" and was a former reporter for Matichon Newspaper.

== Royal decorations ==
Jurin has received the following royal decorations in the Honours System of Thailand:

- Knight Grand Cordon (Special Class) of The Most Noble Order of the Crown of Thailand
- Knight Grand Cordon (Special Class) of the Most Exalted Order of the White Elephant
