= Democrat Party (Thailand) =

Thai political party

Democrat Party พรรคประชาธิปัตย์
- Leader: Abhisit Vejjajiva
- Secretary-General: Chaiwut Bannawat
- Spokesperson: Pongsakorn Kwanmuang
- Founder: Khuang Aphaiwong
- Founded: 6 April 1946; 80 years ago
- Merger of: Democratic Party; Progressive Party
- Headquarters: 67 Setsiri 2 Rd. Phaya Thai, Phaya Thai, Bangkok
- Youth wing: Young Democrat
- Women's wing: Democratic Women
- Membership (2025): 65,182
- Ideology: Conservative liberalism; Classical liberalism; Constitutional monarchism; 1991–2003: Neoliberalism
- Political position: Centre-right
- International affiliation: Liberal International
- Continental affiliation: Council of Asian Liberals and Democrats
- Colours: Light blue
- Slogan: สจฺจํเว อมตา วาจา ('Truth is indeed the undying word' — proverb)
- Anthem: "ประชาธิปัตย์มาแล้ว" ('Democrats Are Here')
- House of Representatives: 21 / 500
- Bangkok Metropolitan Council: 8 / 50
- PAO Chief Executives (including party affiliates): 4 / 76

Website
- democrat.or.th

The Democrat Party (Thai: พรรคประชาธิปัตย์, RTGS: Phak Prachathipat [pʰák prà.t͡ɕʰāː.tʰí.pàt]) is a political party in Thailand. It is the oldest active political party in Thailand. It was founded in 1946 as a royalist party; it now upholds a conservative-liberal and pro-market position.

The Democrat Party made its best showings in parliament in 1948, 1976, and 1996. It has never won an outright parliamentary majority. Its electoral support bases are southern Thailand and Bangkok, although its strength in Bangkok has declined rapidly since the 2019 general election. Since 2004, Democrat candidates won three elections for the governorship of Bangkok. From 2005 to 2019 and since 2025, the Democrat Party has been led by Abhisit Vejjajiva, a former prime minister of Thailand.

== Names ==
The Thai name of the party, Prachathipat (ประชาธิปัตย์), is derived from the word prachathipatai (ประชาธิปไตย) which means 'democracy', 'democratic' or 'democrat'. The party said it wanted the term to mean the people in whom democracy is vested.

== History ==
Former logo of Democrat Party

=== Party founding ===
The Democrat Party was founded by Khuang Aphaiwong on 5 April 1946, but the party considers 6 April as the party's founding day, to coincide with Chakri Memorial Day, as a conservative and royalist party, following the January 1946 elections. Early members included royalists opposed to Pridi Phanomyong and former Seri Thai underground resistance members. The party competed against the parties affiliated with Pridi Phanomyong and the Progressive Party of brothers Seni and Kukrit Pramoj. In the January 1946 elections, the Pridi-led coalition had won a majority in parliament. However, Pridi declined the nomination as prime minister and the parliament appointed Khuang as premier. Khuang resigned in March 1946, after being defeated on a bill, and was replaced by Pridi. The smaller Progress Party later merged with the Democrat Party.

=== Accusation against Pridi Phanomyong ===
After the death of King Ananda Mahidol in 1946, the Democrat Party accused Pridi of having been the mastermind behind the king's death and spread this propaganda throughout the capital. Seni Pramoj's wife told the US chargé d'affaires that Pridi had the king assassinated, and Democrat Party members spread the same rumor to the British Embassy. A few days after the king's death, a Democrat MP yelled out, "Pridi killed the King!" in the middle of a crowded theater.

=== November 1947 coup and the 1949 Constitution ===
By the time of the elections of August 1946, the Democrat Party was backed by royalists like Prince Upalisarn Jubala, Srivisarn Vacha, Sridhamadibes, Borirak Vejjakarn, and Srisena Sombatsiri. Except for Prince Upalisarn Jubala, all of these figures would become Privy Councilors to King Bhumibol Adulyadej. Parties affiliated with Pridi continued to win a majority of seats in parliament. Pridi was appointed premier, but later conceded to Luang Thamrong Navasavat. A military coup led by Marshal Plaek Phibunsongkhram later overthrew the Thamrong government.

The palace persuaded Marshal Plaek to appoint Khuang Aphaiwong as figurehead civilian prime minister. In subsequent elections on 29 January 1948, the Democrats won a majority for the first time, and reappointed Khuang as premier. Khuang packed his cabinet with palace allies, much to the consternation of the military. The military later, claiming that they were supporters of constitutional monarchy, demanded that Khuang resign. Marshal Plaek replaced Khuang as prime minister.

Although having no representatives in the cabinet, the Democrats had key representatives in the constitution drafting committee. Headed by Seni Pramoj and dominated by royalists under the direction of Prince Rangsit and Prince Dhani, the 1949 Constitution elevated the throne to its most powerful position since the 1932 overthrow of the absolute monarchy. Among its features was a senate whose members were to be appointed directly by the king. The constitution triggered protests among much of the public. It was attacked as contrary to the purpose of the 1932 revolution. Critics were branded republicans and communists.

Subsequent elections saw military-backed parties winning the majority in the House; however the Senate was still dominated by Democrats and other royalists. As Marshal Plaek was still premier, tensions between the military and the Democrat/palace-alliance steadily increased. On 29 November 1951, the military and the police seized power, just as King Bhumibol's ship was returning to Thai waters. Although the military's 1952 constitution, which was similar to the 1932 Constitution, called for elections, the Democrats had been practically barred from government for the following 23 years for their anti-military stance, denying them chances to serve the people.

=== Sarit Thanarat's government ===
Sarit Thanarat seized power from Marshal Plaek in 1957. Unlike Marshal Plaek, Sarit deified the throne, thus removing any advantage that the Democrats, who had previously been dominated by royalists, may have had. The junta did not immediately abrogate the 1952 constitution, but instead appointed Pote Sarasin as figurehead civilian premier. Elections were held on 15 December 1957, resulting in the Democrats losing to military-backed parties. Sarit's ally, General Thanom Kittikachorn, was appointed premier. Sarit later went to the US to seek treatment for liver cirrhosis. Eight months later, he recovered, returned and led another coup while dissolving parliament, abrogating the constitution, and ruling by revolutionary council. For the next nine years, there were no elections in Thailand, and the Democrat Party was dormant.

=== Thanom Kittikachorn's rule through military power ===
Thanom Kittikachorn, who had succeeded Sarit after his death, was pressured to promulgate a democratic constitution on 20 June 1968, and hold elections in February 1969. Parties affiliated with Thanom won the election, and the Democrats joined the opposition due to their anti-dictatorship stance. Thanom, his son Narong, and his brother-in-law Praphas Charusathien became known as the "three tyrants". They later executed a coup against their own government on 17 November 1971, abrogating the constitution and running the kingdom through a National Executive Council. Beginning in 1972, popular demands for democratic freedoms began to grow. In response to the demands, the National Executive Council drafted a new charter in December 1972, which established a wholly appointed 299-member National Legislative Assembly.

=== Shift to an unstable civilian government ===
Opposition to the three tyrants culminated on 14 October 1973, when 400,000 persons protested at the Democracy Monument. A violent crackdown and subsequent intervention by the king led to the appointment of Privy Councilor Sanya Dhammasakdi as premier. The three tyrants left the kingdom. Sanya established a constitution drafting committee, consisting of Kukrit Pramoj (who by this time had established and defected to the Social Action Party) and many academics. The new constitution was promulgated on 7 October 1974.

Legislative elections were held in January 1975, resulting in none of the 22 parties coming close to winning a majority. The Democrats, led by Seni Pramoj, formed a coalition government in February 1975. Seni was appointed premier, but the coalition was unstable, and was replaced in less than a month by a Social Action Party-led coalition which appointed Social Action Party leader Kukrit Pramoj as premier.

=== Seni Pramoj and the 6 October 1976 massacre ===
The kingdom descended into political chaos, with anti-leftist groups growing increasingly violent. In January 1976, the military pressured Kukrit to dissolve parliament. Elections were scheduled on 14 April. The months leading up to the election were particularly eventful: The head of the Socialist Party was assassinated, the Red Gaur attempted to bomb the headquarters of the New Force Party (a leftist party), and the Chart Thai Party was established with the slogan "Right Kills Left". Seni Pramoj's Democrats won the most seats in the election, and formed an unstable coalition government.

Seni's government came under great pressure. A bill to extend elections to local levels was passed by parliament 149–19, but the king refused to sign the bill or return it to parliament, effectively vetoing it. As anti-leftist sentiments mounted, Praphas Charusathien returned shortly from exile and met the king. Students protesting Praphas' return were attacked by Red Gaur paramilitary units. On 19 September 1976, Thanom also returned from exile and was immediately ordained as a monk at Wat Bovornives. Massive protests erupted. The king and queen returned from a trip to the south and visited monk Thanom, leading Seni to resign from the premiership in protest. His resignation was refused by parliament, but initial attempts to reshuffle his cabinet were vetoed by the king. The political tension finally culminated in the 6 October 1976 massacre, when Village Scouts and Red Gaur joined with some military and police to massacre at least 46 students protesting at Thammasat University. That evening, the military seized power and installed hard-line royalist Tanin Kraivixien as premier.

The military coup to restore order was endorsed by the king, who declared it was "a manifestation of what the people clearly wanted." The new constitution did not express any obligation for the government to have a cabinet or elections, and gave the premier near-absolute powers.

=== The Democrat Party in the 1990s ===
The Democrat Party, being led by Bhichai Rattakul, became an outspoken opponent of military rule in Thai politics during the 1990s. The Democrat Party was the key member of the "People Power" movement in 1992.

==== Chuan Leekpai ====
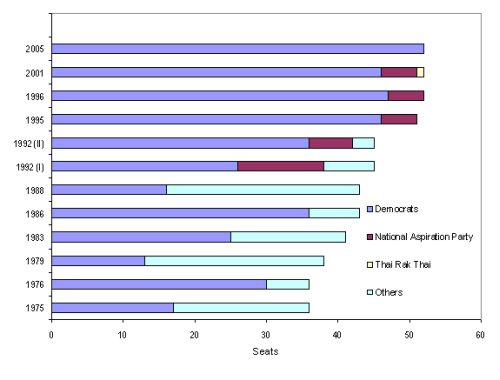
Election results in the south, 1975–2005

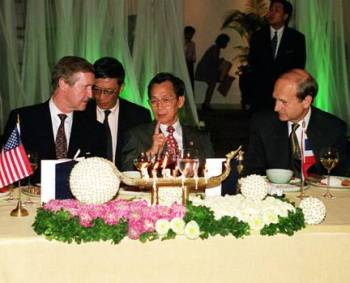
Prime Minister Chuan Leekpai hosts a dinner welcoming Secretary of Defense William S. Cohen

The party's voter base is traditionally concentrated in southern Thailand and in Bangkok, where the party relies on the support from the capital's aristocratic, meritocratic, and educated middle and upper classes. In the 1990s, under the leadership of Chuan Leekpai, a native of Trang Province, the Democrats quickly became the dominant party in southern Thailand. The influences of provincial politicians from the south into the party created considerable tension with the party's Bangkok establishment. Chuan's "Mr. Clean" image, however, made him personally popular with Democrat Party supporters throughout Thailand, and so the party managed to stay cohesive under his leadership. The first Chuan government (1992–1995) fell when members of the cabinet were implicated in profiting from the Sor Phor Kor 4-01 land project documents distributed in Phuket Province. Chuan was again premier from 1997 to 2001, in the midst of the 1997 Asian financial crisis and its aftermath. The party lost a landslide election victory to Thaksin Shinawatra's populist Thai Rak Thai (TRT) party, winning 128 seats compared to the TRT's 248 in the 2001 general election.

After the election in 2001, Thaksin Shinawatra the leader of Thai Rak Thai Party, became prime minister. New Aspiration Party has joined the government. Shortly thereafter. The New Aspiration Party was merged with the Thai Rak Thai Party. Mostly to join Thai Rak Thai party (the governing party) with Gen. Chavalit Yongchaiyudh except Lieutenant Colonel Thita Rangsitpol Manitkul, WRTA Member of the Parliament and Deputy Secretary of the party. Offset to the Democrat Party (Thailand) (Opposition Party) remains the only MPs moving from the opposition party government. During her tenure as a member of the House of Representatives.

=== The Democrat Party in the 2000s ===
==== Banyat Bantadtan ====
In 2003, Chuan retired from his position as party leader. Banyat Bantadtan, a southerner and a close aide to Chuan, succeeded him after a closely fought leadership contest with Abhisit Vejjajiva.

Democrat Party 2005 election poster highlighting the "201" campaign

Democrat Party's candidate Apirak Kosayothin won the 2004 Bangkok gubernatorial election; the TRT Party did not submit a candidate. The Democrat Party lost further ground to Thai Rak Thai in the 2005 general election. In the election campaign, the Democrats had a populist platform, promoting job creation, universal education and health care, and law and order against crime and corruption. The party aimed to gain 201 seats, enough to launch a vote of a no confidence debate against the premier. They won 96 of 500 seats and 18.3 percent of the popular vote. The party's leader, Banyat Bantadtan, resigned after the election.

On 6 March 2005, Abhisit Vejjajiva was elected new party leader. Upon succeeding the party's leadership from Banyat, Abhisit noted, "It will take a long time to revive the party because we need to look four years ahead and consider how to stay in the hearts of the people."

==== Abhisit Vejjajiva and the Thai Rak Thai government ====
The popularity of the populist Thai Rak Thai Party in Thai politics from 2001 to 2006 presented new challenges to the Democrat Party. The TRT championed populist policies with its focus on providing affordable and quality health care for all citizens, village-managed microcredit development funds, the government-sponsored One Tambon One Product program, and others. The populist policies earned the TRT enormous support from rural constituencies, unprecedented in Thailand's history.

Opposition to the TRT government rose in Bangkok after Thaksin's family announced their tax-free sale of their 49.6 percent stake in Shin Corp to Temasek for almost 73.3 billion baht on 23 January 2006. The People's Alliance for Democracy began a series of anti-government protests. Several Democrat Party leaders also joined the PAD, which accused Thaksin of disloyalty to the throne and asked King Bhumibol to appoint a replacement prime minister. Thaksin Shinawatra dissolved the House of Representatives on 24 February 2006 and called for an election. On 24 March 2006, Abhisit Vejjajiva publicly backed the People's Alliance for Democracy's call for a royally-appointed government. Bhumibol, in a speech on 26 April 2006, responded, "Asking for a royally-appointed prime minister is undemocratic. It is, pardon me, a mess. It is irrational".

Abhisit and his opposition parties allies boycotted the April 2006 elections, claiming it "diverted public attention" from Thaksin's corruption charges and his sale of Shin Corp. The boycott caused a constitutional crisis, prompting Thaksin to call another round of elections in October 2006, which the Democrats did not boycott. The army seized power on 19 September and cancelled the upcoming election.

==== 2006 coup and military government ====
Abhisit voiced displeasure at the 2006 coup that overthrew Thaksin, but otherwise did not protest it or the military junta that ruled Thailand for over a year. A fact-finding panel at the attorney-general's office found that the Democrat Party bribed other parties to boycott the April 2006 parliamentary election, which forced a constitutional crisis, and voted to dissolve the party. It also found that Thaksin's Thai Rak Thai party bribed other parties to contest the election. A junta tribunal acquitted Abhisit and the Democrats of the vote fraud charges, but convicted and banned the Thai Rak Thai party and its entire executive team.

Abhisit supported the junta's 2007 Constitution, calling it an improvement on the 1997 constitution. The military junta organized general elections for 23 December 2007.

Despite being banned from politics for five years, Thaksin Shinawatra was popular in his former support bases in the central, north, and northeastern regions and attempted to maintain an active role in Thai politics by supporting the People's Power Party, which had become the successor party of the banned TRT. Abhisit promoted populist policies in his party's campaign as the Democrat Party's platform in the 2007 parliamentary election. He claimed that while his platform was categorically considered to be populist, it sought to curb inflation while maintaining fiscal soundness, to apply the village-based microcredit development funds used in the Thaksin-led government, but do it as part of promoting royalist sufficiency economy policies in rural areas, and to strengthen the country's long-term competitiveness through universal education through high school.

In the junta-administered 2007 parliamentary election, the People's Power Party won the largest share of the vote and formed a six-party coalition government. The Democrats' populist platform was poorly received in the central, north, and northeastern regions. The Democrat Party became the opposition party as it was the second-largest party in the House of Representatives.

==== People's Alliance for Democracy and the 2008 political crisis ====
The People's Alliance for Democracy resurfaced to destabilize the People's Power government, after having gone dormant following the 2006 coup. Several Democrat Party leaders allied themselves with PAD in the subsequent 2008–2010 Thai political crisis. PAD organized extended street protests and later led a months-long seizure of Government House, the seat of Thai government. In November 2008, PAD supporters seized and occupied Don Muang Airport and Suvarnabhumi Airport.

PAD declared that the only person they would accept as premier was Abhisit of the Democrat Party. Abhisit disapproved of the sieges, but did not stop his deputies from their PAD involvement.

==== 2008–2011 coalition government ====
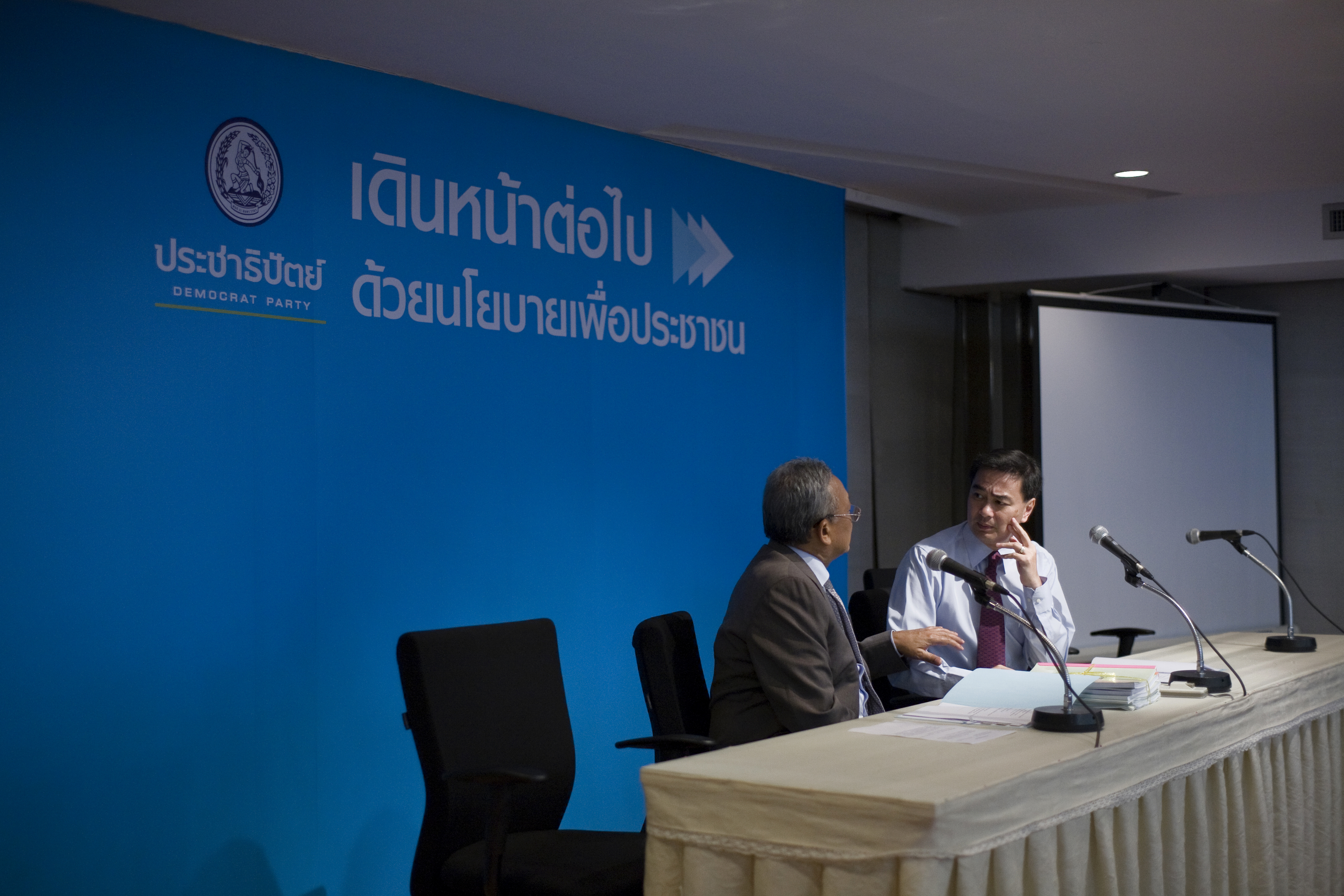
Abhisit Vejjajiva and Suthep Thaugsuban in Party Executive Committee Meeting in 2011

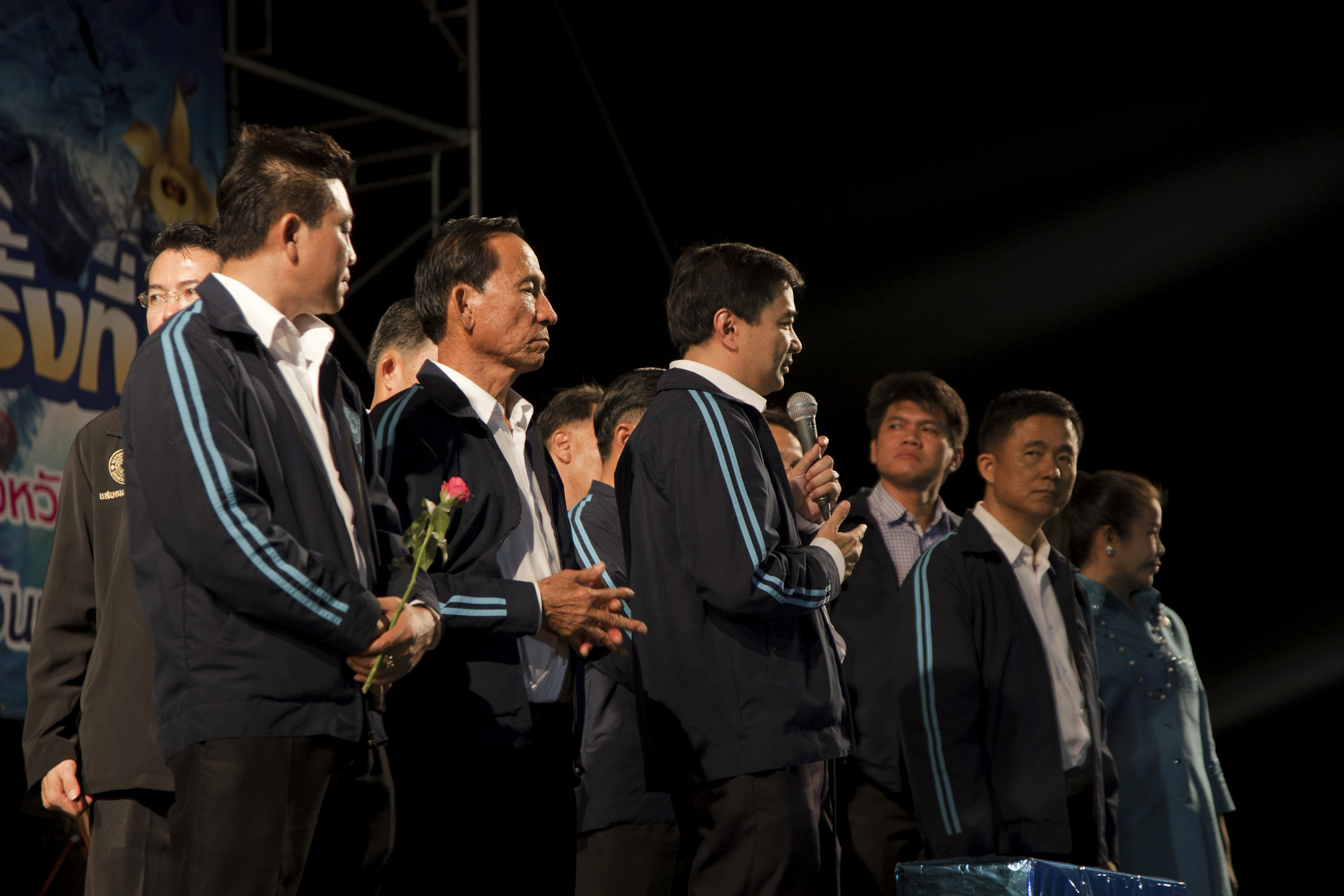
Democrat Party rally in Chonburi, 2012

Three leaders of the Democrat Party from 1991 to 2019 (From left to right: Banyat Bantadtan, Abhisit Vejjajiva and Chuan Leekpai)

The sieges ended when the constitutional court banned the People's Power Party and two of its coalition allies. During the critical period that followed the rulings, it is alleged that army commander and co-leader of the 2006 coup, General Anupong Paochinda, coerced former PPP MPs, mainly those of the Friends of Newin Group, to endorse a Democrat Party-led coalition, which secured enough parliamentary votes to allow Abhisit to be elected prime minister. These MPs, along with MPs of four other former PPP-coalition parties, crossed the aisle to endorse a Democrat-led coalition government. In a December 2008 parliamentary session, the Democrat-led coalition government was voted upon, with 235 to 198 votes in favor of Democrat Party leader and candidate for PM Abhisit Vejjajiva.

During Songkran (Thai New Year), anti-government UDD protesters disrupted the Fourth East Asia Summit. Violent protests then erupted in Bangkok, leading Abhisit to declare a state of emergency for three days, censoring the media, and using military force to end the protests.

Soon afterward, PAD leader Sondhi Limthongkul was the target of an unsuccessful assassination attempt. Both Sondhi's son and Thaksin claimed that factions within the Democrat government were behind the assassination. Abhisit's foreign minister counter-claimed that Thaksin was behind it.

==== 2011 general election ====
Abhisit dissolved parliament in early-2011 and scheduled general elections for 3 July 2011. Abhisit unveiled a slate of candidates highlighted by 30 celebrities and heirs of political families, including Chitpas Bhirombhakdi, heiress of the Singha Beer fortune and former staff member of Abhisit's secretariat office. Abhisit promised to increase the minimum wage by 25 percent if the Democrat Party won the election.

At the general election on 3 July 2011, the Democrats were only able to defend 159 seats in the House of Representatives, while rivaling Pheu Thai Party led by Yingluck Shinawatra won an outright majority. The next day, Abhisit stepped down as the party leader. However, on 6 August, he was re-elected as the leader of the Democrat Party with the support of 96 percent of those eligible to vote at the party's assembly—some 330 people including local branch leaders and MPs.

==== 2019 general election ====
In 2018, the Democrats held a contest for party leader in preparation for the upcoming election. Abhisit was re-elected party leader, beating former PDRC leader, Warong Dechgitvigrom, by approximately 10,000 votes.

Abhisit said that the Democrats would not form a government with Phalang Pracharat, the most prominent pro-junta party. Additionally, he said the Democrats would not support Prayut Chan-o-cha for Prime Minister. These statements were met with skepticism from both the junta and the media.

In April, Prayut responded by saying that he expected the Democrats to change their stance and work with the junta after the election. Additionally, many commentators predicted Democrats would form a government coalition with Phalang Pracharat.

The 2019 election proved to be a major upset to the party, which came in fourth place and won no seats in its traditional stronghold of Bangkok, leading to Abhisit resigning as party leader, having stated previously that he would do so if the party won fewer than 100 seats. Jurin Laksanawisit was elected to succeed him on 15 May. The Democrats then formed a pact with the Bhumjaithai Party, intending to use their combined 103 MPs as leverage for negotiations with other parties. At the first meeting of the new parliament, Democrat ex-prime minister Chuan was nominated speaker of the House of Representatives by PPRP deputy leader Nataphol Teepsuwan and was elected to that office. This move was seen by commentators as a signal that a deal had been reached and a coalition with the Phalang Pracharat party was imminent. The coalition was finally made official on 4 June, one day before the National Assembly was scheduled to vote for the prime minister, following a vote by party MPs and executives. Following this, Abhisit resigned as MP, stating that he could not break his previous stance on not supporting Phalang Pracharat.

==== 2022 sexual scandal ====
Prinn Panitchpakdi, deputy leader of the Democrat Party was accused of many sexual misconduct cases, including rape. Senior executives such as Kanok Wongtra-ngan and Mallika Boonmeetrakul Mahasuk left the party for a moral responsibility.

==== 2023 general election ====
The 2023 election proved another setback to the party, which slipped further down to sixth place with only 25 MPs, prompting the resignation of party leader Jurin. The Democrats once again won no seats in its traditional stronghold of Bangkok and received only 2.68% of the party-list vote in the capital. This is likely due to conservatives voting for the military-backed United Thai Nation while the educated middle class (once the Democrats’ core voter base) moved to the progressive Move Forward Party. Furthermore, the party lost ground in the historically Democrat southern provinces to other conservative parties.

During the 2nd prime ministership election, 16 out of 25 Democrat MPs voted for the Pheu Thai candidate Srettha Thavisin despite agreeing to abstain. This caused a divide between the “New Democrat” MPs (who are more open to working with Pheu Thai) and the “Old Guard” MPs (who still view Pheu Thai as their historical rival.)

On 9 December 2023, a meeting was held to choose the party's new leader with four candidates running for leadership — former prime minister Abhisit Vejjajiva, the party's acting leader Chalermchai Sri-on, former Democrat MP Lt-Colonel Thita Rangsitpol Manitkul former MP and businesswoman Watanya “Madame Dear” Bunnag. Before the actual leadership vote was held, Watanya was forced out of the race due to not meeting the requirements which led to her immediately leaving the meeting in tears. After a brief chat between Abhisit and Chalermchai, Abhisit announced his decision to withdraw his candidacy and leave the party altogether. The meeting resulted in Chalermchai Sri-on being elected as the Democrat Party's new leader.

Chalermchai Sri-on resigned as leader of the Democrat Party on 12 September 2025, citing health reasons. On 18 October, Abhisit Vejjajiva, former party leader and the 27th Prime Minister of Thailand was elected a day after he rejoined the party.

== Democrat Party Prime Ministers ==
Name	Portrait	Start Date	End Date	Election
Khuang Aphaiwong		1 August 1944	31 August 1945	1946, 1948
Khuang Aphaiwong		31 January 1946	24 March 1946	1946, 1948
Khuang Aphaiwong		10 November 1947	8 April 1948	1946, 1948
Seni Pramoj		17 September 1945	31 January 1946	1975, 1976
Seni Pramoj		15 February 1975	14 March 1975	1975, 1976
Seni Pramoj		20 April 1976	6 October 1976	1975, 1976
Chuan Leekpai		23 September 1992	13 July 1995	1992, 1995, 1996, 1997, 2001
Chuan Leekpai		9 November 1997	9 February 2001	1992, 1995, 1996, 1997, 2001
Abhisit Vejjajiva		17 December 2008	5 August 2011 (Note: Although the Democrats lost the election, Abhisit was selected as prime minister after the elected People's Power Party was banned by the Constitutional Court.)	2007, 2008, 2011, 2019

== Democrat Party Speaker ==
Name	Portrait	Start Date	End Date	Election
Kasem Boonsri		4 June 1946	10 May 1947	— (4th)
Kasem Boonsri		20 February 1948	14 June 1949	1948 (5th)
Uthai Pimjaichon		19 April 1976	6 October 1976	1976 (12nd)
Chuan Leekpai		4 August 1986	29 April 1988	1986 (15th)
Chuan Leekpai		28 May 2019	20 March 2023	2019 (25th)
Marut Bunnag		22 September 1992	19 May 1995	1992 (18th)
Bhichai Rattakul		30 June 2000	9 November 2000	— (20th)

== Election results ==
=== General elections ===
Election	Total seats won	Total votes	Share of votes	Seat change	Outcome of election	Election leader
1946 (Aug)	18 / 82				Opposition	Khuang Aphaiwong
1948	54 / 186			▲36 seats	Governing party (until 1948)	Khuang Aphaiwong
1948	54 / 186			▲36 seats	Opposition (after 1948)	Khuang Aphaiwong
1952	Boycotted					Khuang Aphaiwong
1957 (Feb)	31 / 283			▼23 seats	Opposition	Khuang Aphaiwong
1957 (Dec)	39 / 281			▲9 seats	Opposition	Khuang Aphaiwong
1969	57 / 219			▲18 seats	Opposition	Seni Pramoj
1975	72 / 269	3,176,398	17.2%	▲15 seats	Governing coalition (until 1975)	Seni Pramoj
1975	72 / 269	3,176,398	17.2%	▲15 seats	Opposition (after 1975)	Seni Pramoj
1976	114 / 279	4,745,990	25.3%	▲43 seats	Governing coalition	Seni Pramoj
1979	33 / 301	2,865,248	14.6%	▼81 seats	Opposition (until 1980)	Seni Pramoj
1979	33 / 301	2,865,248	14.6%	▼81 seats	Junior partner in governing coalition (after 1980)	Seni Pramoj
1983	56 / 324	4,144,414	15.6%	▲23 seats	Junior partner in governing coalition	Bhichai Rattakul
1986	100 / 347	8,477,701	22.5%	▲44 seats	Junior partner in governing coalition	Bhichai Rattakul
1988	48 / 357	4,456,077	19.3%	▼52 seats	Junior partner in governing coalition (until 1990)	Bhichai Rattakul
1988	48 / 357	4,456,077	19.3%	▼52 seats	Opposition (after 1990)	Bhichai Rattakul
1992 (Mar)	44 / 360	4,705,376	10.6%	▼4 seats	Opposition	Chuan Leekpai
1992 (Sep)	79 / 360	9,703,672	21.0%	▲35 seats	Governing coalition	Chuan Leekpai
1995	86 / 391	12,325,423	22.3%	▲7 seats	Opposition	Chuan Leekpai
1996	123 / 393	18,087,006	31.8%	▲37 seats	Opposition (until 1997)	Chuan Leekpai
1996	123 / 393	18,087,006	31.8%	▲37 seats	Governing coalition (after 1997)	Chuan Leekpai
2001	128 / 500	7,610,789	26.6%	▲5 seats	Opposition	Chuan Leekpai
2005	96 / 500	4,018,286	16.1%	▼32 seats	Opposition	Banyat Bantadtan
2006	Boycotted – nullified					Abhisit Vejjajiva
2007	165 / 480	14,084,265	39.63%	▲69 seats	Opposition (until 2008)	Abhisit Vejjajiva
2007	165 / 480	14,084,265	39.63%	▲69 seats	Governing coalition (after 2008)	Abhisit Vejjajiva
2011	159 / 500	11,433,762	35.15%	▼14 seats	Opposition	Abhisit Vejjajiva
2014	Election Nullified (Ruled as Unconstitutional)					Abhisit Vejjajiva
2019	53 / 500	3,947,726	11.11%	▼106 seats	Junior partner in governing coalition	Abhisit Vejjajiva
2023	25 / 500	925,349	2.29%	▼28 seats	Opposition (until 2024)	Jurin Laksanawisit
2023	25 / 500	925,349	2.29%	▼28 seats	Junior partner in governing coalition (after 2024)	Jurin Laksanawisit
2026	21 / 500	2,017,120	6.04%	▼4 seats	Opposition	Abhisit Vejjajiva

=== Bangkok Metropolitan Administration elections ===
==== Bangkok gubernatorial elections ====
Election	Candidate	Total votes	Share of votes	Outcome
1975	Thammanoon Thien-ngern	99,247	39.13%	Elected ✓
1985	Chana Rungsang	241,001	25.35%	Lost ✗
1990	Pravit Ruchirawong	60,947	5.50%	Lost ✗
1992	Bhichit Rattakul	305,740	40.39%	Lost ✗
1996	Supported Bhichit Rattakul	768,994	49.47%	Elected ✓
2000	Thawatchai Sajakul	247,650	11.17%	Lost ✗
2004	Apirak Kosayodhin	911,441	38.20%	Elected ✓
2008	Apirak Kosayodhin	991,018	45.93%	Elected ✓
2009	Sukhumbhand Paribatra	934,602	44.41%	Elected ✓
2013	Sukhumbhand Paribatra	1,256,349	47.75%	Elected ✓
2022	Suchatvee Suwansawat	254,723	9.60%	Lost ✗

==== Bangkok Metropolitan Council elections ====
Election	Total seats won	Total votes	Share of votes	Seat change
1985	35 / 54			▲35 seats
1990	1 / 57			▼34 seats
1994	8 / 55			▲7 seats
1998	22 / 60			▲14 seats
2002	30 / 61			▲8 seats
2006	34 / 57			▲4 seats
2010	45 / 61			▲10 seats
2022	9 / 50	348,852	15.06%	▼36 seats
2026	8 / 50	372,861	17.35%	▼1 seat

==== District Council elections ====
Election	Total seats won	Total votes	Share of votes	Seat change
2010	289 / 361			▲289 seats

== See also ==
- Khuang Aphaiwong
- Seni Pramoj
- Kukrit Pramoj
- Abhisit Vejjajiva
- List of political parties in Thailand
