= List of Thammasat University people =

The following is a list of notable alumni, non-graduates, lecturers, professors and administrators affiliated with the Thammasat University (TU).

== Heads of government ==
Alumni

- Tanin Kraivixien, LLB 1948 – Prime Minister of Thailand, 1976–1977
- Chuan Leekpai, LLB 1962 – Prime Minister of Thailand, 1992–1995; 1997–2001

Founder and professors

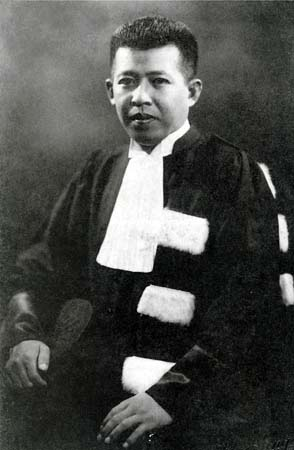
Pridi Banomyong, founder of Thammasat University and former Prime Minister of Thailand

- Pridi Banomyong – Prime Minister of Thailand, 1946; regent for Ananda Mahidol; Free Thai Movement founder; Khana Ratsadon civilian faction leader; professor of Law
- Sanya Dharmasakti – Prime Minister of Thailand, 1973–1975; former president of the Privy Council of Thailand; former president of the Supreme Court; professor of Law
- Major General Mom Rajawongse (M.R.) Kukrit Pramoj – Prime Minister of Thailand, 1975–1976; National Artist of Thailand 1985; author

== Academics ==
- Thongchai Winichakul, BA 1981 – professor in the History Department, University of Wisconsin–Madison; specialist in the intellectual and cultural history of Thailand

== Government and politics ==
- Kaewsan Atibodhi, LLB – politician; former senator for Bangkok; former vice rector of Thammasat University; former law lecturer at Thammasat University
- Chuwit Kamolvisit (born 1961) – Bachelor of Accounting, Master of Political Science; "massage parlor" owner, leader of Rak Thailand Party
- Puey Ungpakorn, 1937 – former governor of the (Central) Bank of Thailand; Magsaysay Award winner 1965; Free Thai member; professor

== Arts and media ==
=== Film, television and music ===
- Pathit Pisitkul – Bachelor of Business Administration; TV actor
- Aniporn Chalermburanawong – Bachelor of Social Studies; beauty queen, winner Miss Universe Thailand 2015, Top 10 at Miss Universe 2015
- Metawin Opas-iamkajorn – Bachelor of Economics; actor, model, singer

=== Authors and journalists ===
- Nitipoom Navaratna – MA 1991 – politician; columnist
- Thommayanti, also known as Wimon Chiamcharoen – diploma (Faculty of Commerce and Accountancy); novelist (National Artist of literature 2012)
- Suwat Woradilok – writer; National Artist of Thailand 1991; civil servant
- Kanok Ratwongsakul (B.A. Journalism and Mass Communication) – newsreader and Senior Vice President, Reporter Nation Broadcasting Corporation Pub Co., Ltd.

== Business and finance ==
- Boonchu Rojanastien (1921–2007) – Bachelor of Accounting, general manager of the Bangkok Bank; "economics tsar" of Thailand, Minister of Finance (1975–76); Deputy Prime Minister (1980–81; 1992–94); leader of Palang Dharma Party (1992–95)
