= 2004 Bangkok gubernatorial election =

← 2000	29 August 2004	2008 →
- Turnout: 62.5%
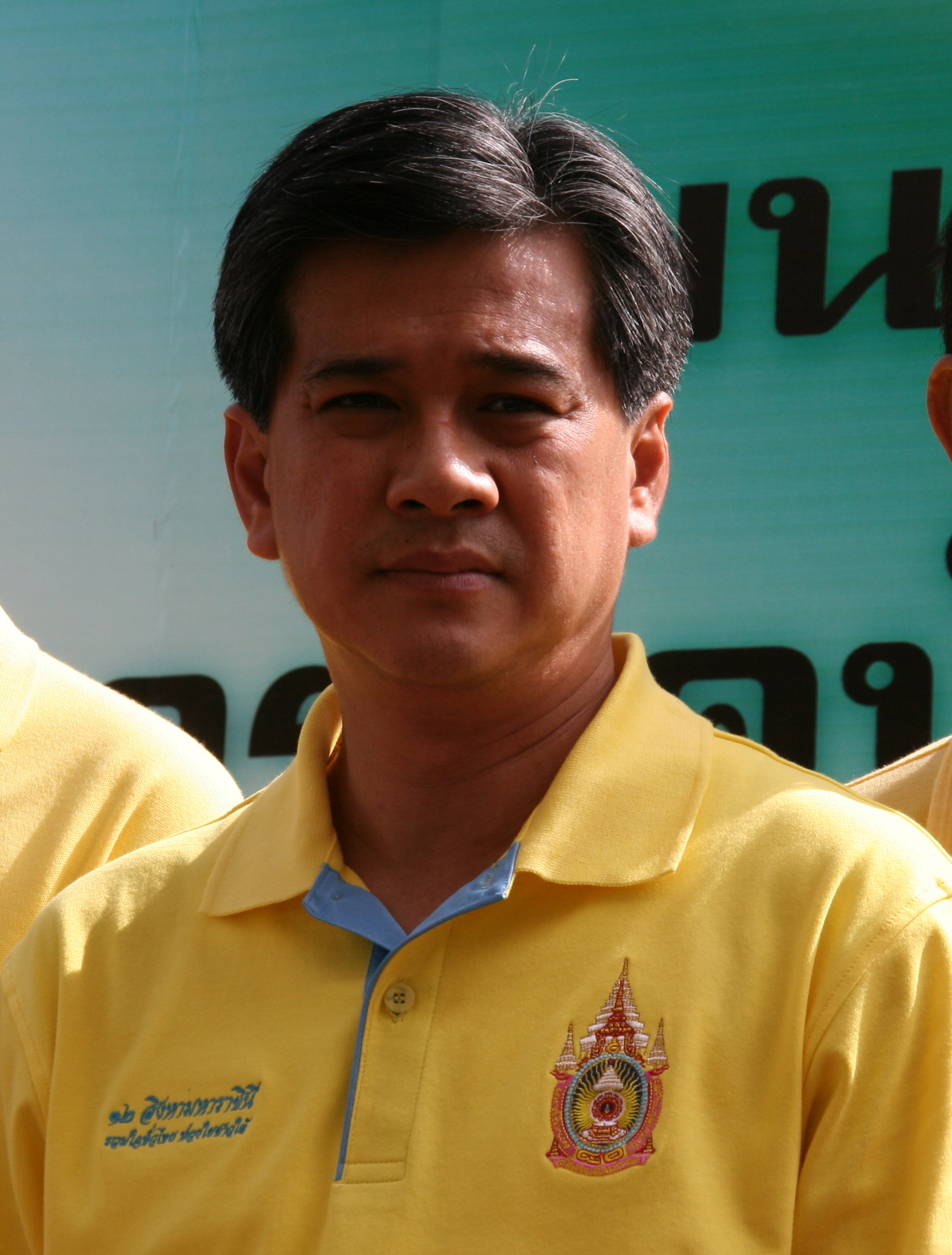

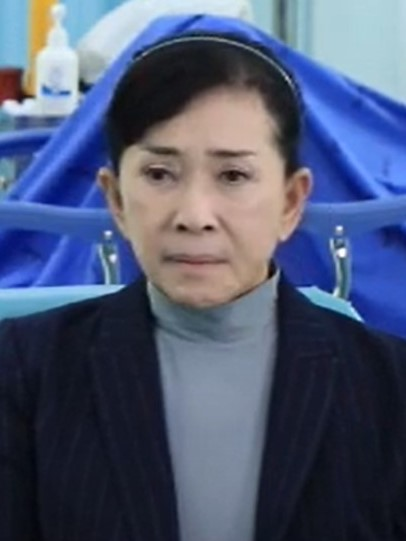

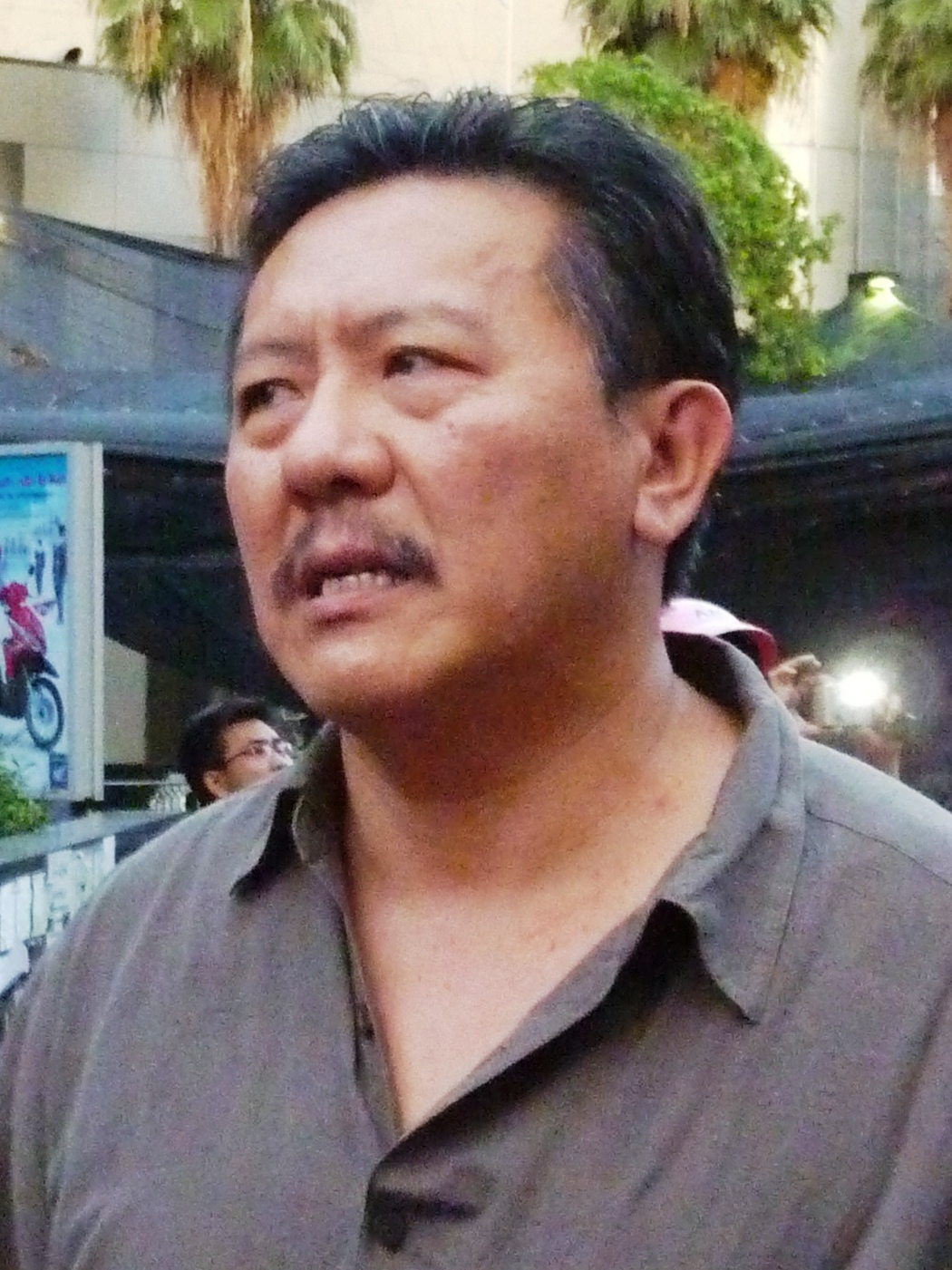

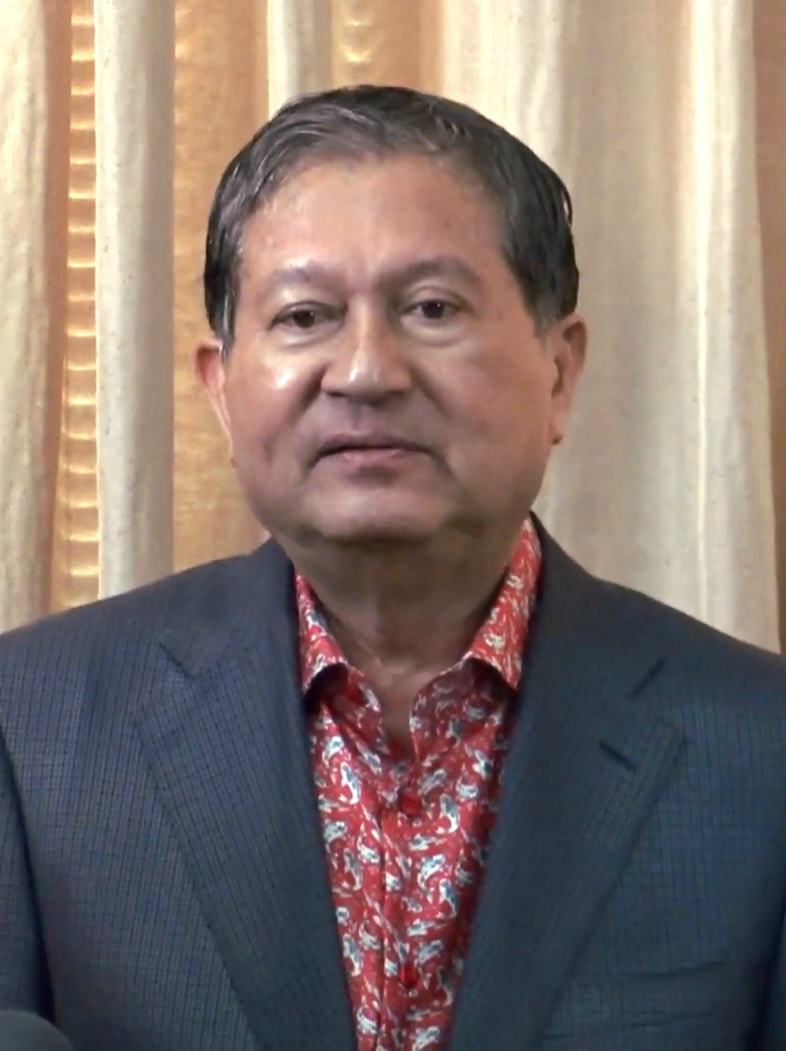
Candidate	Apirak Kosayothin	Paveena Hongsakul	Chuwit Kamolvisit
Party	Democrat	Independent (Note: Supported by Thai Rak Thai Party)	First Thai Nation
Popular vote	911,441	619,039	334,168
Percentage	36.86%	25.04%	13.52%
Candidate	Chalerm Yubamrung	Nitipoom Navaratna
Party	Mass Party	Independent
Popular vote	165,761	135,369
Percentage	6.70%	5.48%
- Gubernatorial election results map. Blue denotes districts won by Kosayothin, Red denotes those won by Hongsakul
Governor before election
Samak Sundaravej
Independent
Elected Governor
Apirak Kosayothin
Democrat

The seventh gubernatorial election for the city of Bangkok, Thailand was held on August 29, 2004, to determine the governor of Bangkok. The Democrat Party's candidate, Apirak Kosayodhin, won 36.86 percent of the vote. Of a total of 3,955,855 voters, 2,472,486 people voted, a turnout rate of 62.50 percent. Samak Sundaravej, the incumbent governor, did not seek to run for a second term and ran instead in the 2006 Thai Senate election.

From the first Bangkok gubernatorial election in 1975 until this time. There were exactly 100 candidates in total.

== Results ==
Candidate	Party	Votes	%
Apirak Kosayodhin	Democrat Party	911,441	36.86
Pavena Hongsakul	Independent (Supported by Thai Rak Thai Party)	619,039	25.04
Chuwit Kamolvisit	First Thai Nation Party	334,168	13.52
Chalerm Yubamrung	Mass Party	165,761	6.70
Nitipoom Navaratna	Independent	135,369	5.48
Bhichit Rattakul	Mot Ngan Group	101,220	4.09
Mana Mahasuveerachai	Independent	84,147	3.40
Karoon Chandrangsu	Independent	11,070	0.45
Wuthipong Priabjareeyawat	Independent	10,243	0.41
Kobsak Chutikul	Independent	3,196	0.13
Peerapong Thanompongphan	Khon Rak Krungthep Group	2,377	0.10
Metta Temchamnan	Metta Tham Group	1,965	0.08
Suchart Kerdphon	Independent	1,298	0.05
Waranchai Chokchana	Independent	1,087	0.04
Withaya Jungkobwattana	Independent	811	0.03
Sumet Tanthanasirikul	Krungthep Phatthana Group	709	0.03
Kittisak Thiravisit	Independent	572	0.02
Udom Wibulthepachat	Independent	478	0.02
Yawara Buntunak	Independent	387	0.02
Chokchai Laohachinbanchorn	Independent	381	0.02
Weerasak Upatham	Thai Citizen Party	239	0.01
Against all		26,763	1.08
Invalid/blank votes		59,765	–
Total		2,472,453	62.5
Registered voters/turnout		3,955,855	51.10
