= Wanasthana Sajakul =

Thai football manager and politician

Personal information
- Full name: Wanasthana Sajakul
- Date of birth: 9 February 1943 (age 83)
- Place of birth: Paluru, Su-ngai Padi, Narathiwat, Thailand

Managerial career
- Years: Team
- 1992–1994: Thailand U-20
- 1993–1995: Thailand B (Dream Team)
- 1996: Thailand
- 2006–2007: Chula-Sinthana FC
- ‡ National team caps and goals as of July 3, 2008

Wanasthana Sajakul, also known as Big Hoy (former name: Thawatchai Sajakul) is a Thai politician and former member of parliament, former manager for the Thailand national football team from 1993 to 1996, and manager of Thailand Premier League side Chula-Sinthana FC. He has led the side to the Thailand Division 1 League, Group B title in 2007 and the Thailand Division 2 League title in 2006.

== Early life & education ==
Born in Su-ngai Padi District, Narathiwat Province, in the lower southern part of Thailand. He graduated from Suankularb Wittayalai School and received a bachelor's degree in Civil Engineering from the Mapúa Institute of Technology (now Mapúa University), Philippines.

== Careers ==
Wanasthana (colloquially known as Big Hoy or Thawatchai) is widely recognized for serving as manager of the Thailand national football team during the 1990s, an era famously known as the "Dream Team." It was a period in which the national team enjoyed considerable success and inspired optimism that its achievements could be further built upon in the years to come. The team featured notable players such as Kiatisuk Senamuang, Natipong Sritong-In, Dusit Chalermsan, Thawatchai Damrong-Ongtrakul, Kovid Foythong, Surachai Jaturapattarapong, Pattanapong Sripramote and Tawan Sripan (now Totchtawan Sripan), with Chatchai Paholpat serving as head coach. His first major achievement was leading Thailand to the gold medal at the 1993 Southeast Asian Games in Singapore. Before that, he was a successful businessman.

In politics, he served as a Member of Parliament (MP) representing Bangkok's Constituency 1 (Dusit, Bang Sue, and Ratchathewi) under the Democrat Party after being elected in the 1996 general election, becoming the only Democrat Party candidate to win a seat in that constituency. In 2000, he ran for Governor of Bangkok as the Democrat Party's candidate, drawing ballot number 13. His principal opponents included Samak Sundaravej, a veteran national politician who had shifted from national politics to contest the local election, and Sudarat Keyuraphan, the candidate of the Thai Rak Thai Party. He finished third in the election and was not elected. Later that same year, he was elected President of the Amateur Boxing Association of Thailand (now Thailand Boxing Association).

He also served as a party-list Member of Parliament representing the Thai Rak Thai Party following the 2001 and 2005 general elections.

In the 2004 Bangkok gubernatorial election, he initially intended to run for governor once again. However, he withdrew before officially registering his candidacy, stating that internal opinion surveys showed no improvement in his level of public support. By that time, he had already spent more than one million baht on printing campaign brochures and promotional materials.

Afterwards, he became involved with several other political parties. He also founded his own political party, the Palang Khon Kila Party (Sport Party of Thailand), which contested the 2011 general election. However, the party failed to achieve electoral success.

== Personal life ==
In his personal life, Wanasthana was married to Supattra Sajakul, although the couple later divorced. They have two sons. Their elder son, Krisada Sajakul, is a politician like his father and has also served as the manager of the Thailand women's national futsal team. Their younger son, Teerapat Sajakul, is a well-known actor and radio DJ. In addition, he has a daughter born outside of marriage, Chonnasorn Sajakul, better known as Sorn, a former member of the K-pop girl group CLC.

== Honours ==
As manager

International

- 1993 SEA Games - Thailand
- 1994 King's Cup - Thailand B (Dream Team)
- 1995 SEA Games - Thailand
- 1996 Tiger Cup - Thailand
- 1997 SEA Games - Thailand

Club

- Thailand Division 1 League Champions : 2007 with Chula-Sinthana FC - Group B
- Thailand Division 2 League Champions: 2006 with Chula-Sinthana FC
