= Phan Thai Norasing =

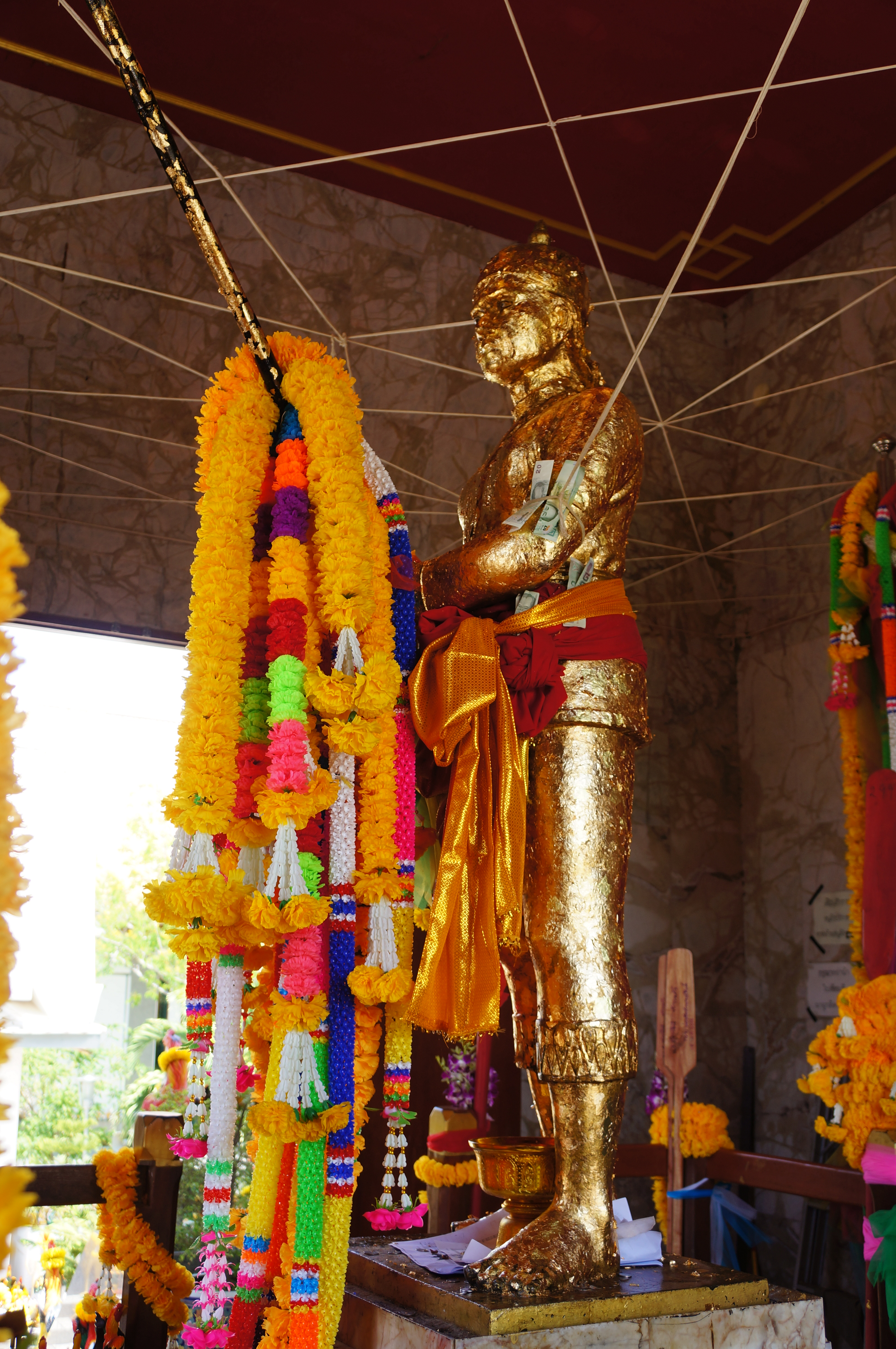
The real-size statue of Phan Thai Norasing

Phan Thai Norasing (Thai: พันท้ายนรสิงห์) is a legendary figure mentioned in some later editions of the royal chronicles of Ayutthaya. He is described as a coxswain of King Sanphet VIII's royal barge in the Ayutthaya period. According to the legend, Phan Thai Norasing served his duty as the coxswain until around 1704 when an accident happened during the king's fishing trip, causing damage to the royal barge. From this, he willingly accepted the penalty according to ancient Thai law, which was execution, despite being given a pardon. Although his existence cannot be fully confirmed, he remained as a famous symbol of honesty and integrity. There are many monuments dedicated to him in places related to his story, such as those presumed to be his execution spot. The story of Phan Thai Norasing has been adapted into various forms of media including films, TV series, and musicals, with possibly altered or extended plots but preserving the core of the story regarding honesty.

== Life ==
It cannot be fully confirmed whether Phan Thai Norasing actually existed or not. Based on the few available historic records, the original name of Phan Thai Norasing is "Sing" (Thai:สิงห์) and his birthplace is assumed to be what is now Pa Mok, Ang Thong. Also, he had a wife named "Sri Nuan". "Phan Thai", is the title for coxswain in Thai. Sing is said to have first met King Sanphet VIII (Phrachao Suea) when the king went on a trip in Ang Thong. During the trip, the king disguised himself as a civilian and met Sing in a boxing match. After that, Sing was summoned by Sanphet VIII and became coxswain, developing a close relationship to the king.

== Death ==
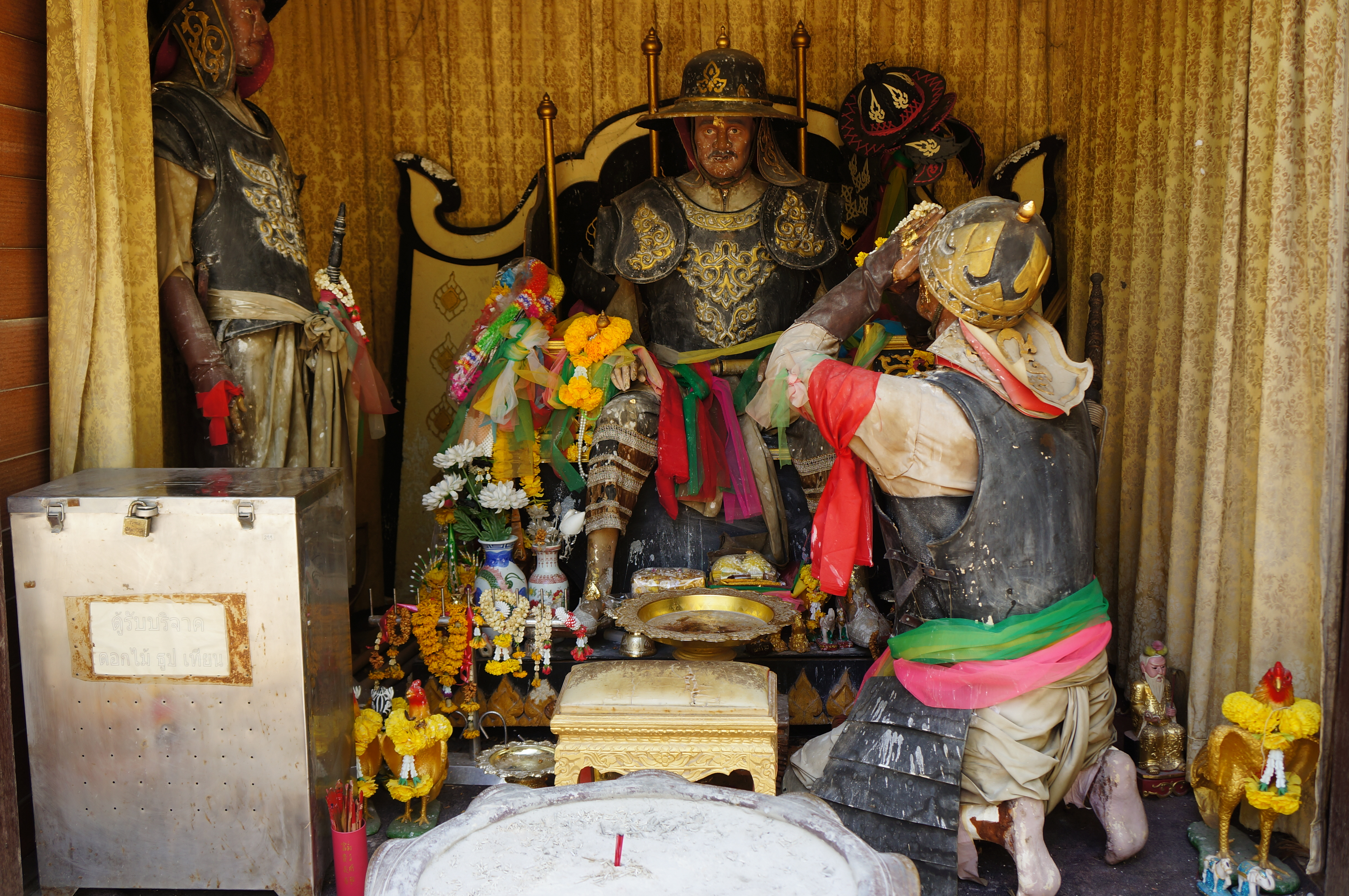
Statues in Phan Thai Norasing historical park presenting the scene when Pha Thai Norasing convinced King Sanphet VIII to order the execution for him

According to historical records, the execution of Phan Thai Norasing occurred in 1704 at Khok Kham Canal, Sakhonburi (Samut Sakhon today). At the time, Khok Kham Canal had a meandering course that made it hazardous to travel through. Some stories suggest that Phan Thai Norasing's choice to enter hazardous waters was in order to protect the king from assassins. Eventually, the royal barge hit a large tree, damaging the figurehead of the royal barge Ekkachai and causing it to fall off. Such damage carried the penalty of beheading according to ancient law. Sing was initially given a special pardon from Sanphet VIII, who considered it an accident, but Sing rejected it. King Sanphet then ordered the crew to create a clay statue representing Sing and beheaded it instead. However, Sing still insisted so the king had no choice but ordering his execution.

== Legacy ==
Because of his life story, he is worshipped and respected by later generation as well as becoming a model of honesty. From this, many shrines and statues were built to dedicate his heroic action. Locations of shrines are based on presumed execution points which are around Khok Kham Canal.

=== Phan Thai Norasing's shrine ===
This shrine is located at the mouth of Khok Kham Canal in Phanthai Norasing, Muang Samut Sakhon, Samut Sakorn. It is believed to be the location of Phan Thai Norasing's execution along with the original eye-level shrine containing the head of Phan Thai Norasing and the figurehead of the Ekkachai barge together. As time went by, this original shrine was damaged and destroyed by water. The new shrine was constructed by Prince Bhanubandhu Yugala during the filming of the 1950 movie. The new shrine is also at eye-level height and has six legs. Additionally, there is a statue of Phan Thai Norasing made of sandalwood.

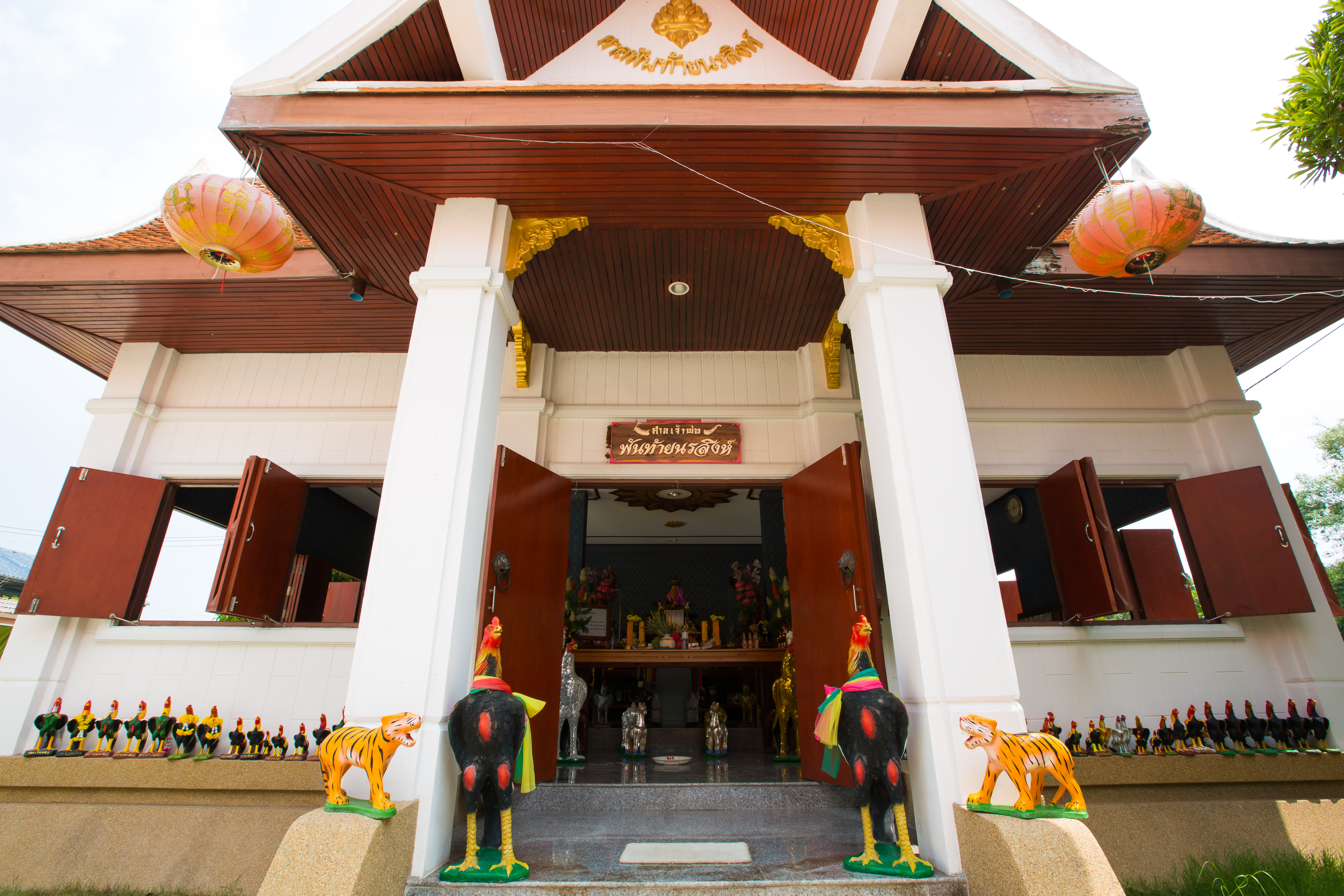
The front of Phan Thai Norasing's shrine (Khok Kham canal)

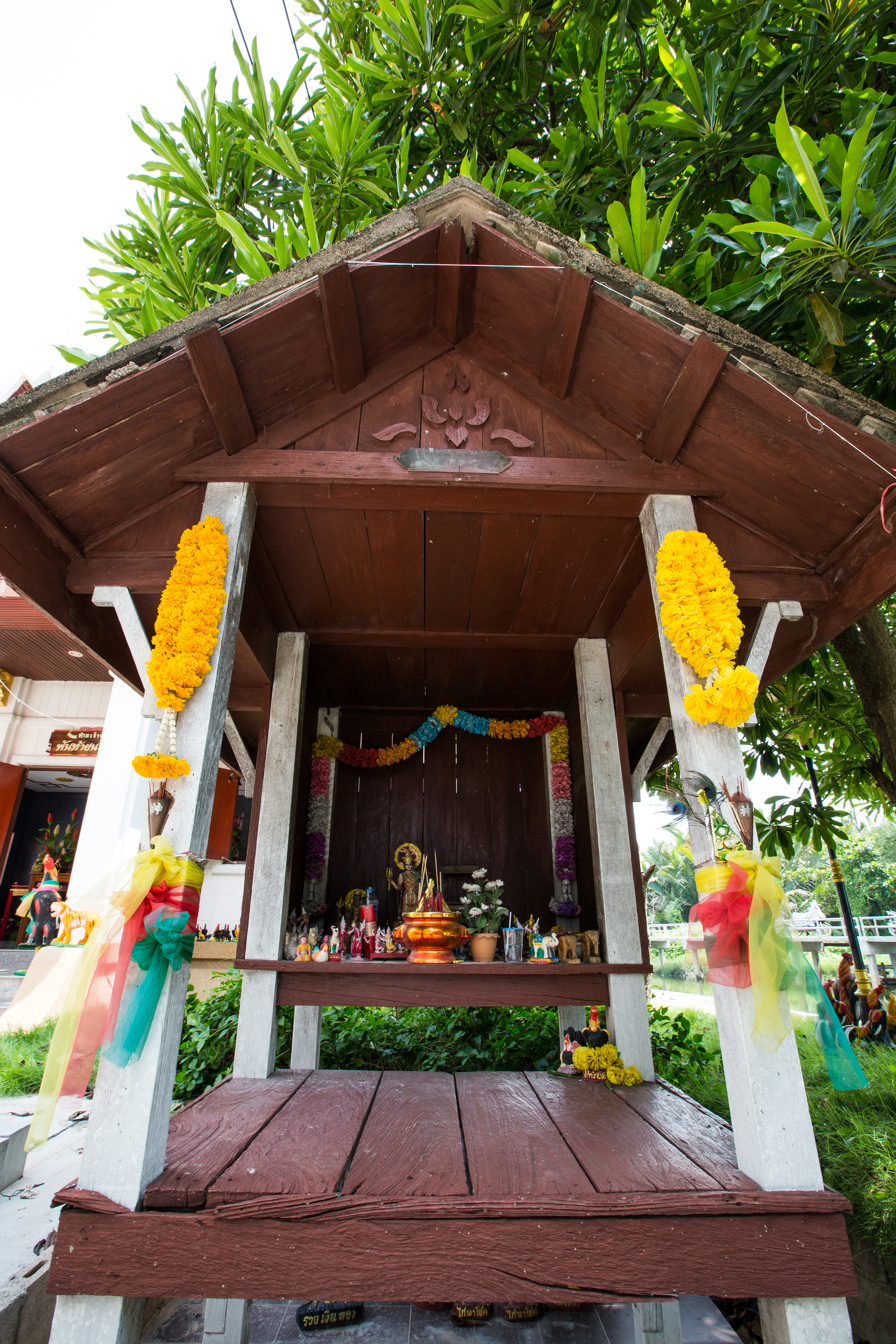
The eye-level height shrine believed to formerly contain the head of Phan Thai Norasing and the damaged figurehead of the barge

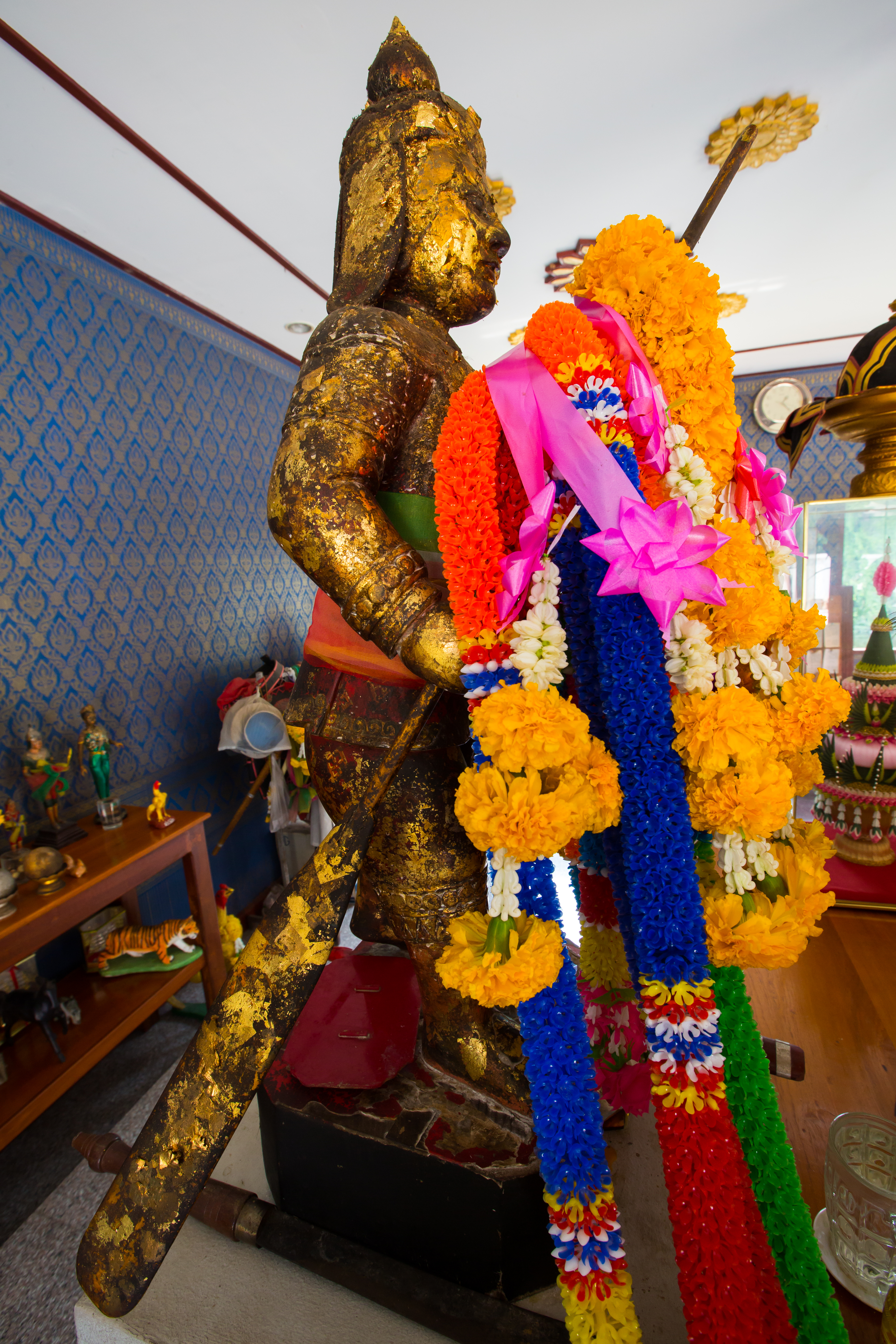
The sandalwood statue of Phan Thai Norasing in the shrine

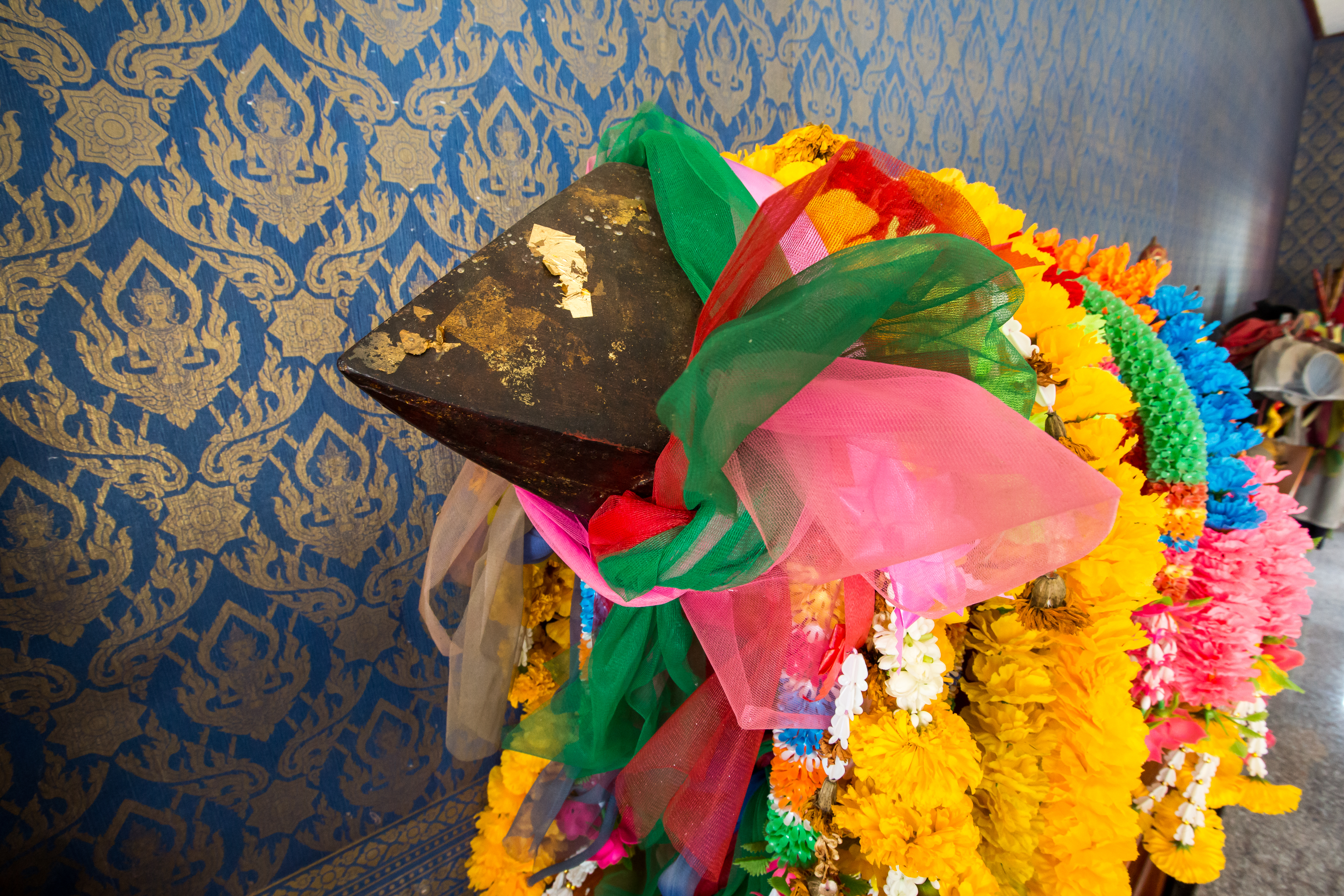
The damaged figurehead of Ekkachai royal barge

=== Phan Thai Norasing Historical Park ===
This historical park is located in Ban Phanthai, Phanthai Norasing, Muang Samut Sakorn, Samut Sakorn. It is also believed to be the original location of Phan Thai Norasing's execution due to the discovery of an 80 cm long damaged piece of wood believed to be the figurehead of the royal barge along with a stick by the Fine Arts Department and teachers of Suankularb Wittayalai School. Scientific examination suggested these woods date from in the same period as attributed to Phan Thai Norasing. The stick was hypothesized to be the scaffold for Phan Thai Norasing's execution. This place was registered as a national historic site by the Fine Arts Department published in Government Gazette Volume 53, page 1533 on 27 September 1936. and a new shrine was reconstructed by the Fine Arts Department on 4 January 1995. A life-size statue showing Phan Thai Norasing steering a barge in the shrine was added in 1976. The shrine is a place of worship for people seeking fortune and wishes. As records state that Phan Thai Norasing loved Thai boxing and cock fighting, people commonly offer cock statuettes, boxing gloves and paddles. There is also a 300-year-old barge presumed to be a ruin from a royal procession or an army dispatch. The dimensions of this barge are 19.47 meters by length, 2.09 meters by width, 1 meters by height, with 7.5-centimeter-thick gunnels

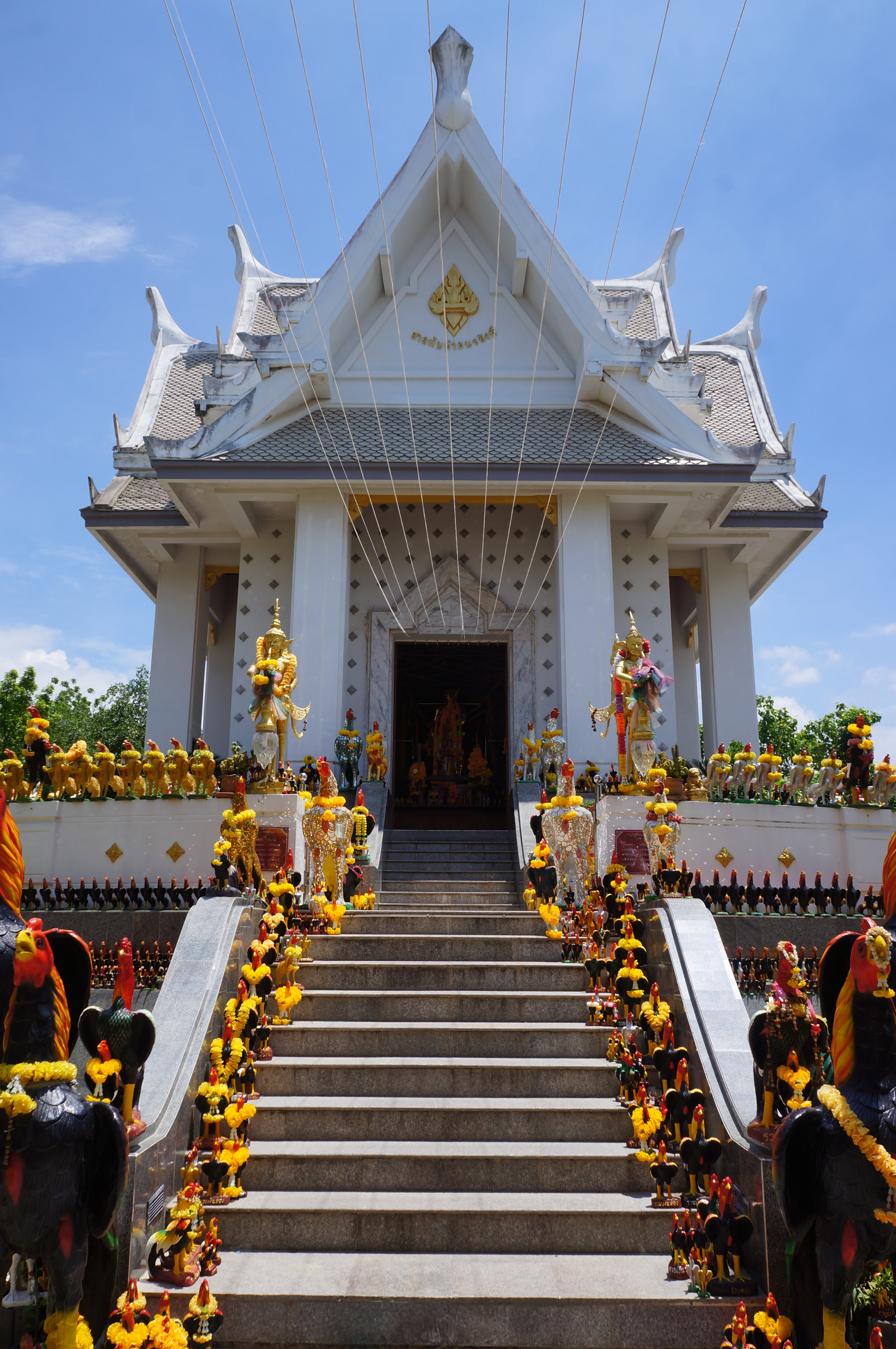
The main shrine of Phan Thai Norasing historical park containing the real-size statue of him

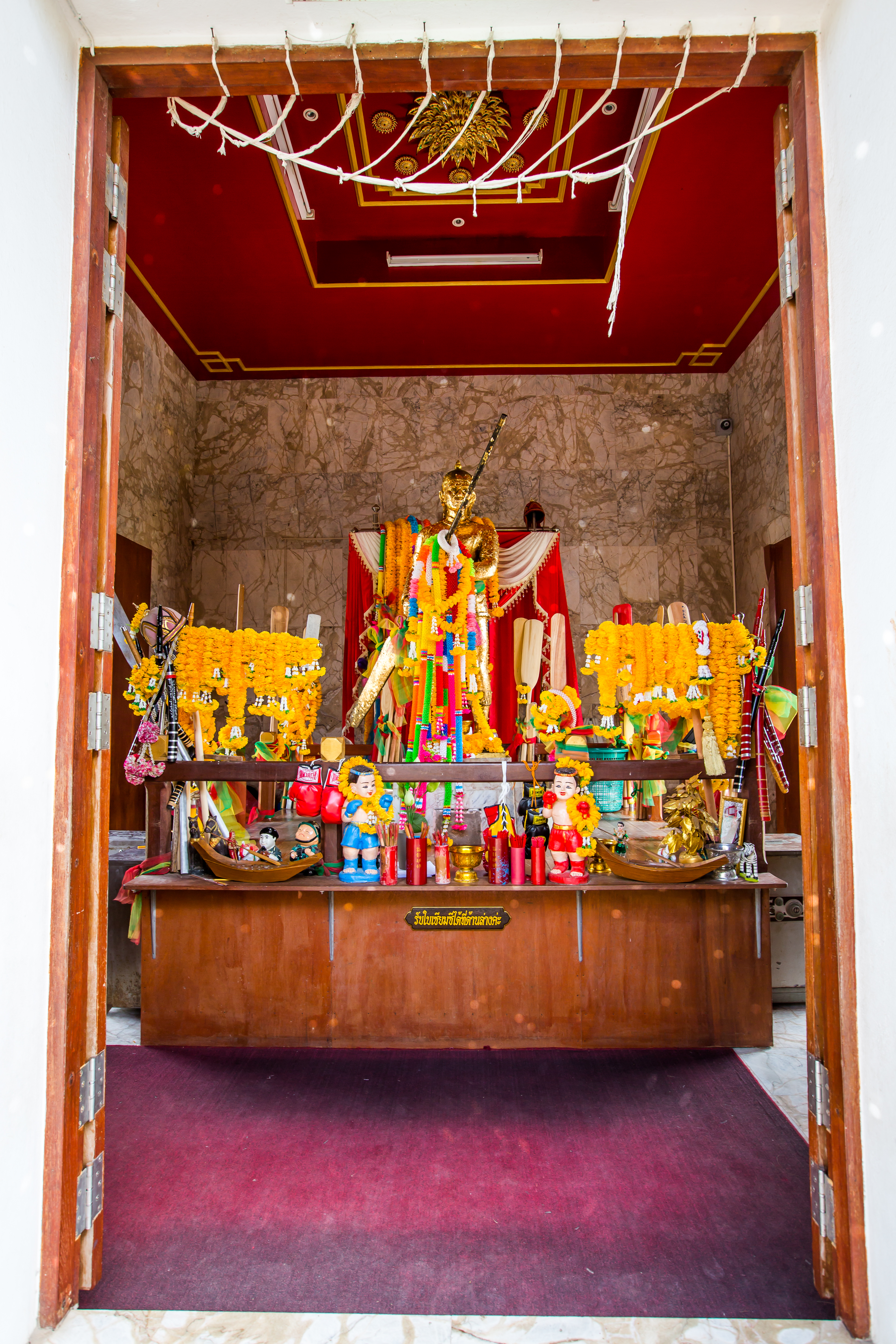
The inside of Phan Thai Norasing's shrine containing the real-size statue of him

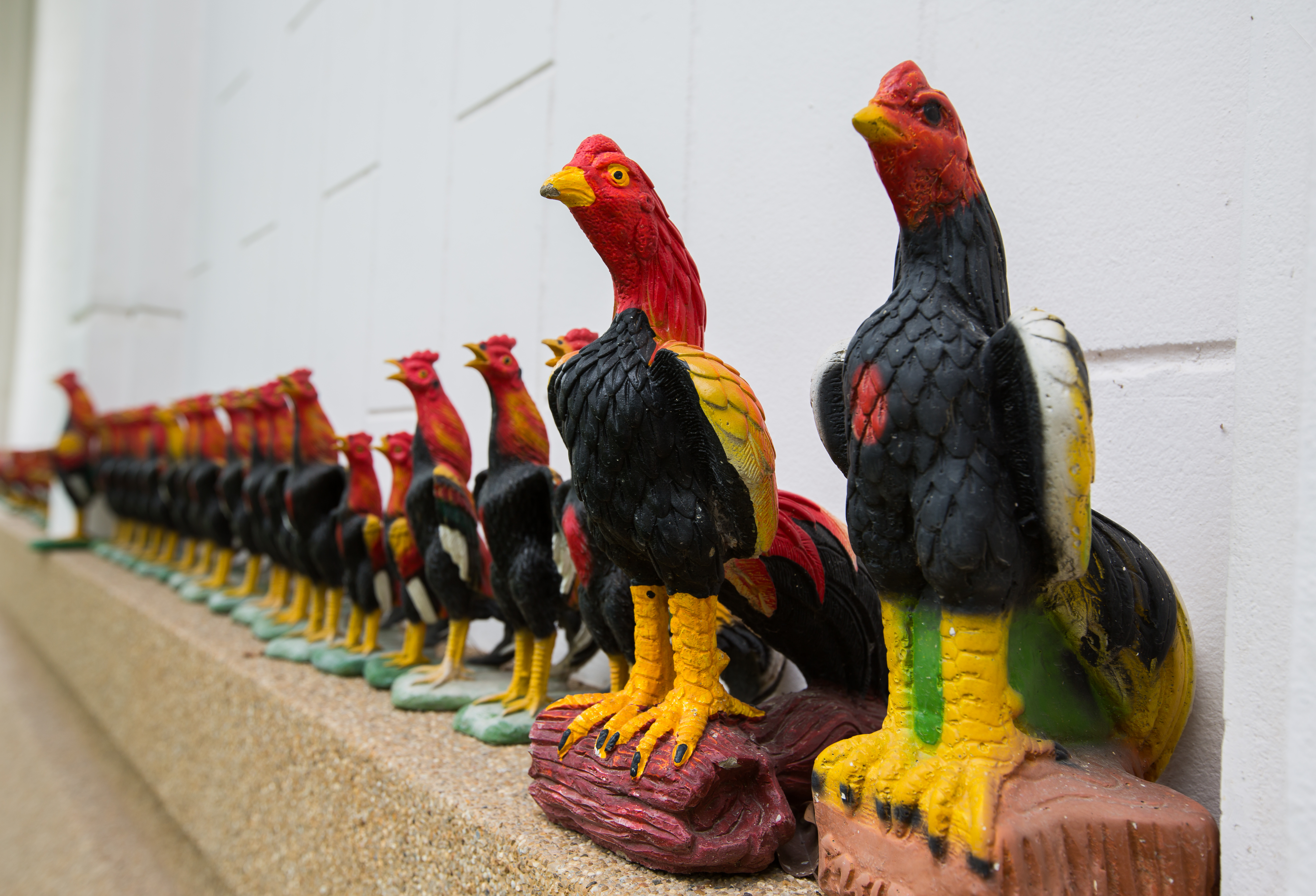
Cock statuettes offered to Phan Thai Norasing

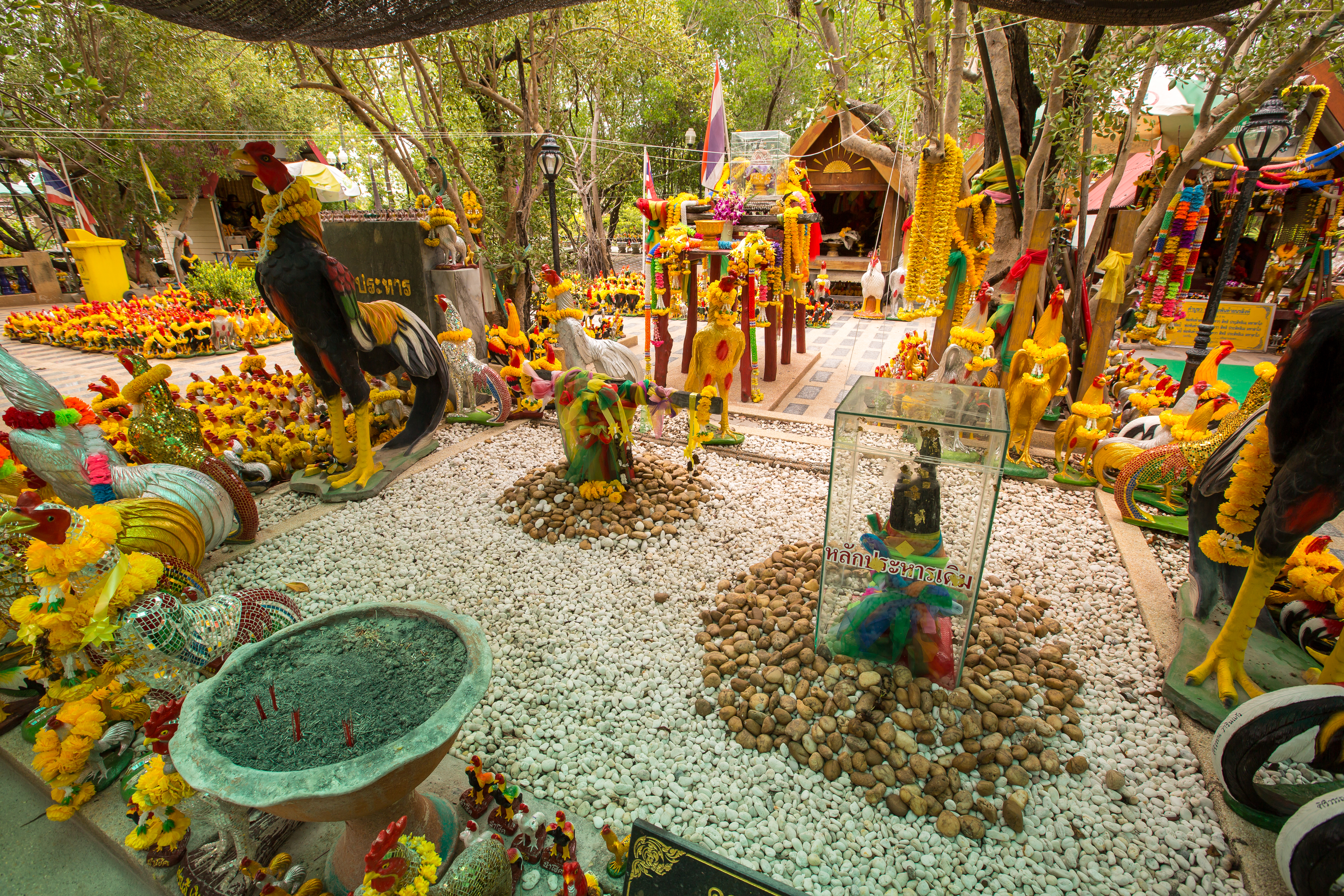
The place believed to be the execution spot of Phan Thai Norasing

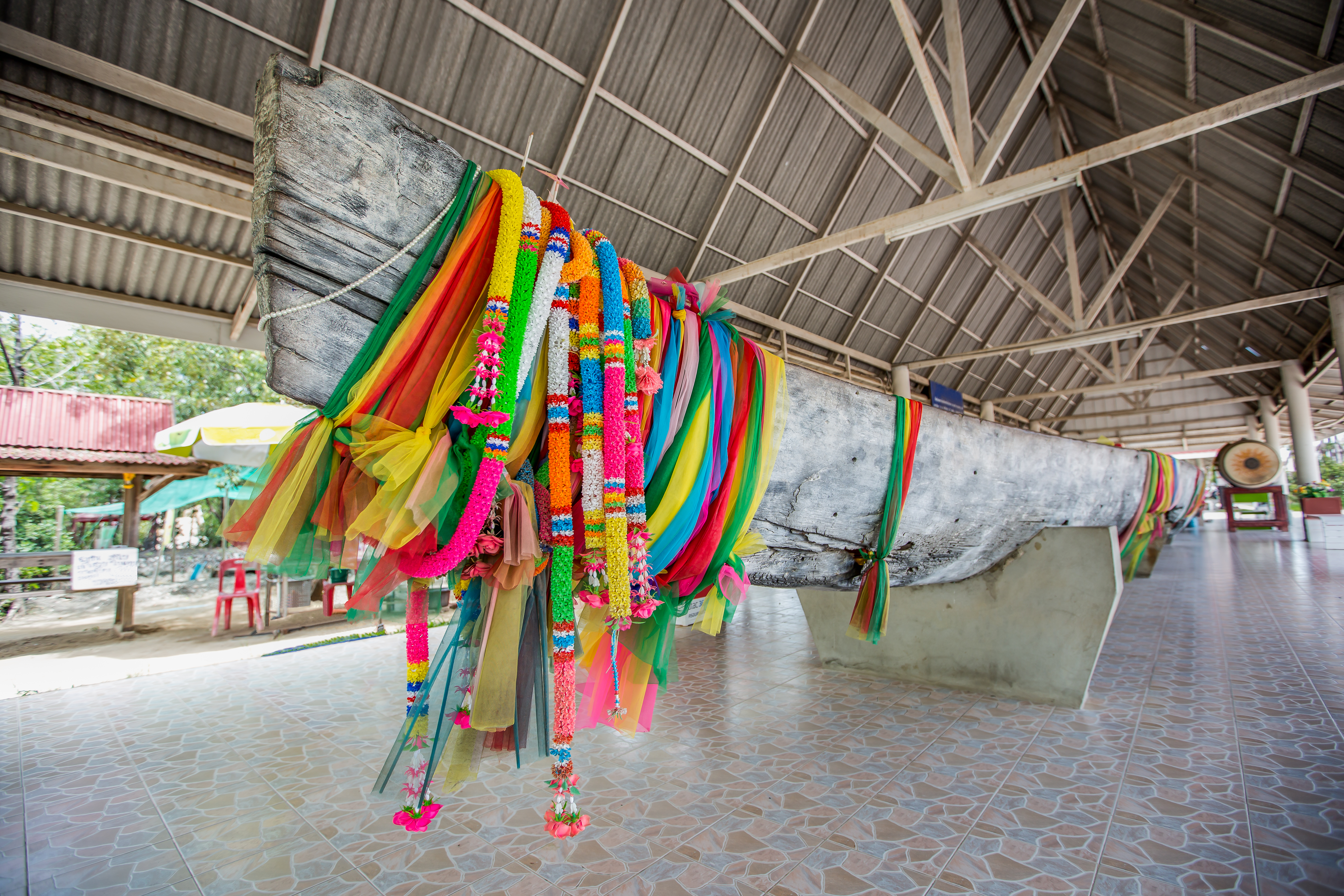
A 300-year-old barge in Phan Thai Norasing Historical Park presumed to be the ruin of army dispatch or royal barge

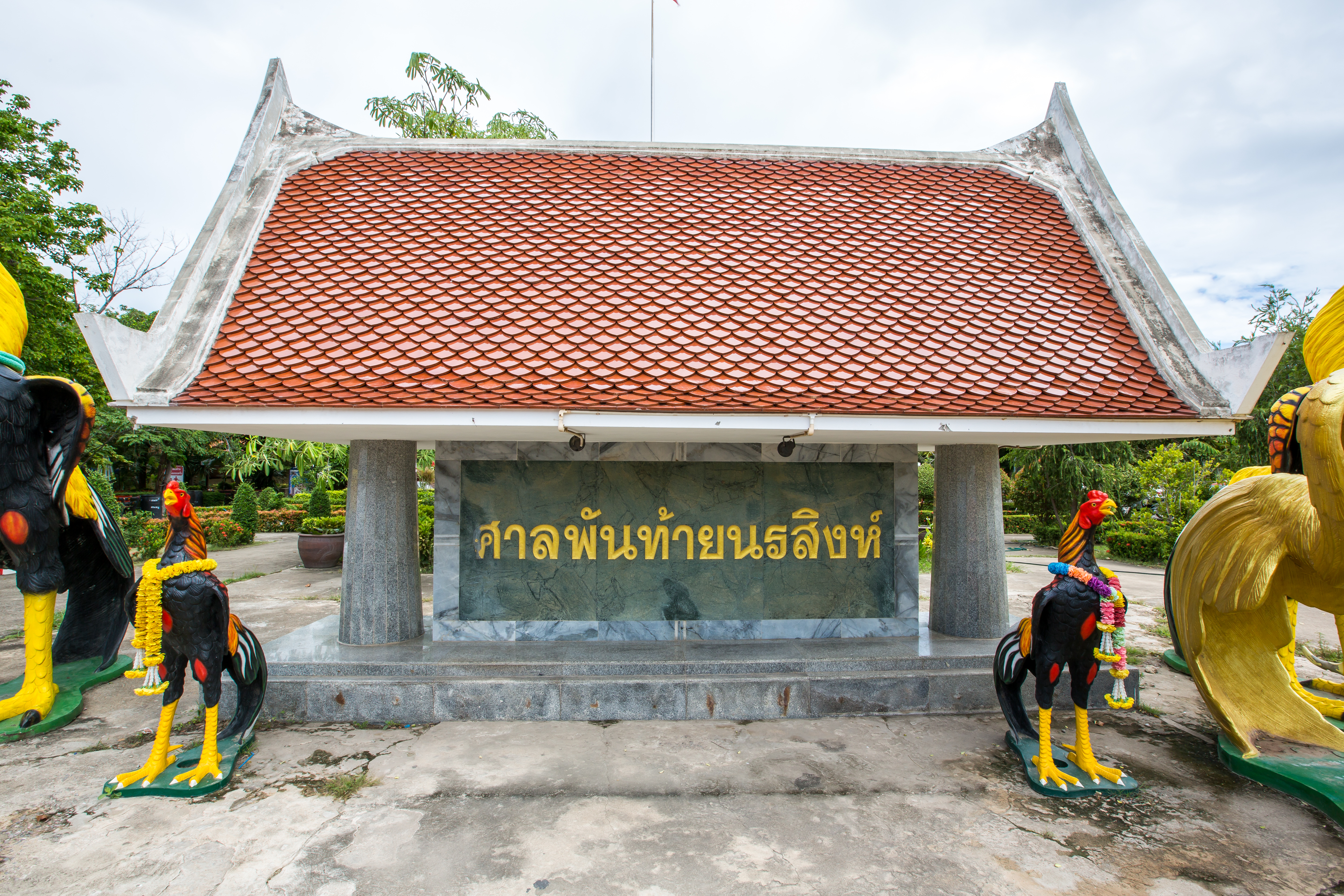
The front sign of Phan Thai Norasing Historical Park

=== Mahachai Canal ===
After the execution of Phan Thai Norasing, King Sanphet VIII is stated to have begun the excavation of Mahachai Canal to mourn his integrity and improve the convenience of water transportation by providing a straighter course than the winding Khok Kham Canal. 30,000 workers are said to have worked on the excavation, which finished in the reign of King Sanphet IX (son of Sanphet VIII). The canal connects the Tha Chin River to the Chao Phraya River.

=== Norasing Sub-District ===
Based on records, it is presumed that Phan Thai Norasing's hometown was located in what is now Pa Mok District, Ang Thong Province, where Norasing Sub-District was established in commemoration. A monument honoring Phan Thai Norasing was also constructed and the opening ceremony held on 4 November 1989.

== In popular culture ==
Many media adaptations of the story of Phan Thai Norasing have been produced including musicals, movies, and TV series.

Forms of media	Year	Actor who played Phan Thai Norasing
Musical	1945	Surasit Sattayawong
Movie	1950	Chuchai Phrakhanchai
Musical	1965	Kamthon Suwanpiyasìrí
TV series	1972	Kamthon Suwanpiyasìrí
TV series	1978	Nirut Sirijanya
Movie	1982	Sorapong Chatree
Musical	1989	Sarunyoo Wongkrachang
TV series	2000	Teerapat Sajakul
Movie	2015	Pongsakorn Mettarikanon
TV series	2016	Pongsakorn Mettarikanon

=== Musicals ===
==== Phan Thai Norasing (1945) ====
The first adaptation of the story of Phan Thai Norasing, the plot of this musical was adapted from royal chronicles by Prince Bhanubandhu Yugala. It was performed by the Siwarom troupe. The main cast were Surasit Sattayawong as Phan Thai Norasing, Suphan Buranaphim as Nuan, and Chok Dokchan as King Sanphet VIII. This musical originated the song "Nam Ta Saeng Tai" (น้ำตาแสงใต้) from the farewell scene between Sing and Nuan. The song and musical was very beloved during and after World War II.

==== Phan Thai Norasing (1965) ====
This musical was a special staging for charity hosted by the Thai Association Against Drug Abuse and Illicit Trafficking. The musical was performed at Thammasat University's auditorium. The main characters were played by Kamthon Suwanpiyasìrí as Phan Thai Norasing, Nonglak Rochanapan as Nuan, and Chalong Simasatian as King Sanphet VIII.

==== Phan Thai Norasing (1989) ====
The musical was performed at Sala Chaloem Thai as the final farewell before its demolition. Main characters were played by Sarunyoo Wongkrachang as Phan Thai Norasing, Nataya Daengbunga as Nuan, and Phisan Akharaseni as King Sanphet VIII.

=== Movies ===
==== Phan Thai Norasing (1950) ====
Prince Bhanubandhu Yugala's adaptation of his own 1945 play, the movie's main cast included Chuchai Phrakhanchai, a famous Thai boxer as Phan Thai Norasing, Suphan Buranaphim as Nuan, and Thanom Akharaseni as King Sanphet VIII.

==== Phrachao Suea Phan Thai Norasing (1982) ====
This movie was produced in 35 mm movie film by Chaiyo Productions Co., Ltd. and directed by Marut. Main characters were played by Sorapong Chatree as Phan Thai Norasing, Apaporn Konthip as Nuan, and Sombat Metanee as King Sanphet VIII.

==== Phan Thai Norasing (2015) ====
This version was directed by Prince Chatrichalerm Yukol. The plot is also based on that of Prince Bhanubandhu Yugala. It was released 30 December 2015. Main characters were played by Pongsakorn Mettarikanon as Phan Thai Norasing, Lieutenant Colonel Wanchana Sawasdee as King Sanphet VIII, and Pimdao Panichsamai as Nuan

=== Television series ===
==== Phan Thai Norasing (1972) ====
The first TV series version was aired on Channel 4 Bang Khun Phrom, now MCOT HD. Main characters were played by Kamthon Suwanpiyasìrí as Phan Thai Norasing and Nonglak Rohjonpan as Nuan.

==== Phan Thai Norasing (1978) ====
This version was aired on Channel 5. Main characters were played by Nirut Sirijanya as Phan Thai Norasing and Duangchai Hathaikan as Nuan

==== Phan Thai Norasing (2000) ====
This version first aired on Channel 7. There are 28 episodes in total. The plot was adapted from the movie version written by Prince Bhanubandhu Yugala. This version was directed by Pisaan Akarasaynee. Main characters were played by Teerapat Sajakul as Phan Thai Norasing, Phiyada Jutharattanakul as Nuan, and Pongpat Wachirabunjong as King Sanphet VIII.

==== Phan Thai Norasing (2016) ====
An expanded version of the 2015 film, this latest version was directed and written by Chatrichalerm Yukol. Main characters were played by Pongsakorn Mettarikanon as Phan Thai Norasing, Lieutenant Colonel Wanchana Sawasdee as King Sanphet VIII, and Pimdao Panichsamai as Nuan. The series aired on Workpoint TV from 4 March to 6 June 2016, with 19 episodes in total.
