= Chuvit Garden =

Park in Bangkok, Thailand

Coordinates: 13°44′19″N 100°33′25.5″E

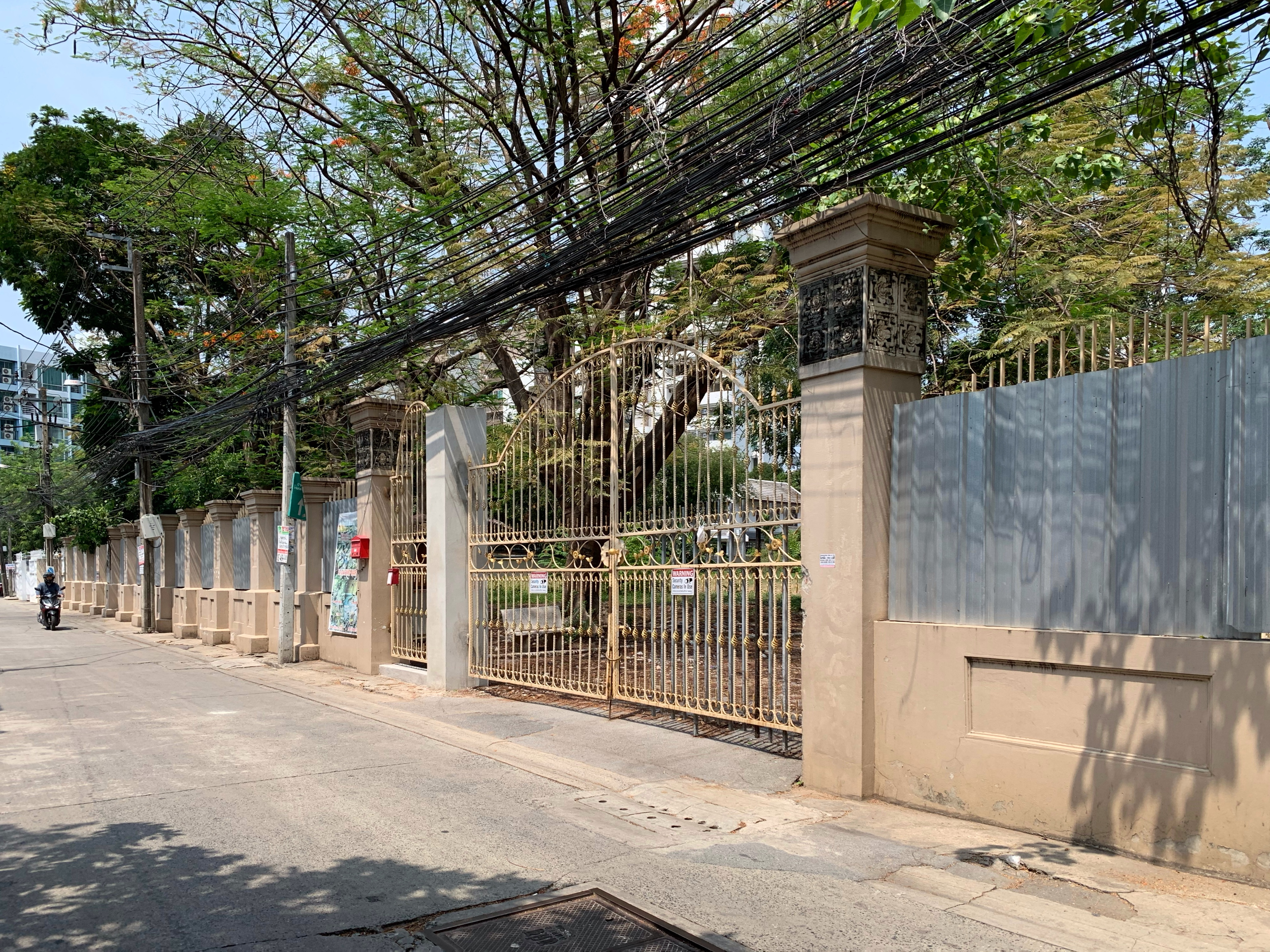
Chuvit Garden, closed, as of 2021

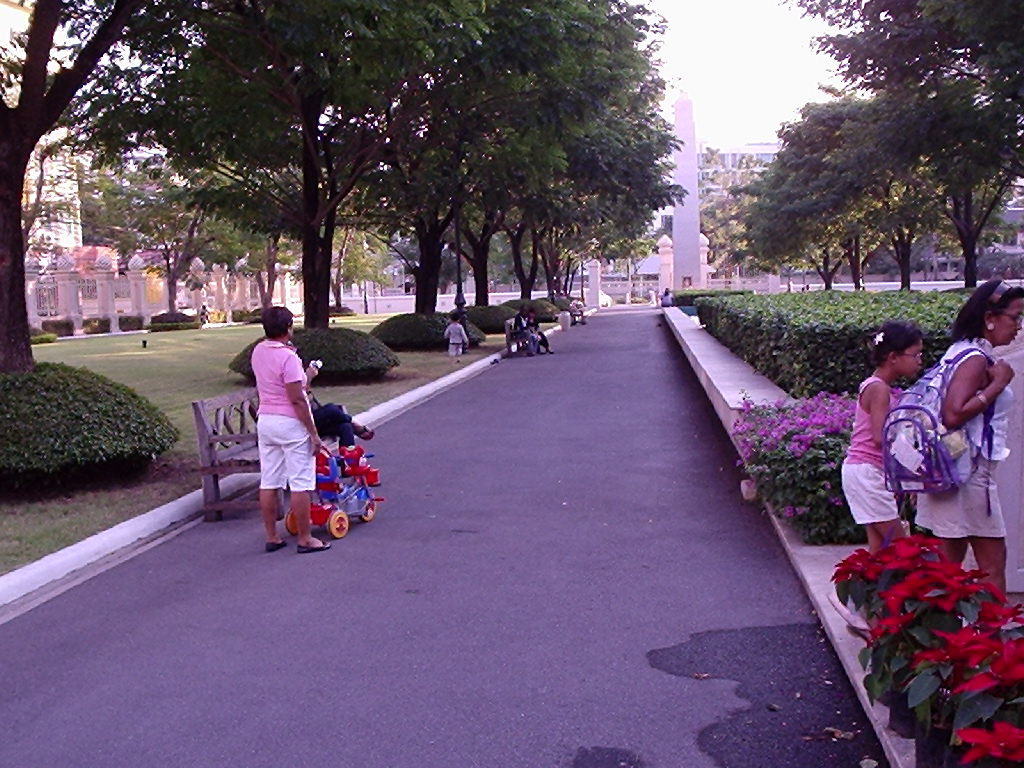
Chuvit Garden

Chuvit Garden (also known as Chuwit Park) was a private park in Bangkok, at Sukhumvit Soi 10. It was created in 2006 by Chuwit Kamolvisit who owns the area. The block was formerly known as Sukhumvit Square. The park was open to the public daily from 08:00 to 10:00 and from 16:00 to 20:00.

In the early hours of 26 January 2003 about 120 bars and other businesses on this plot of land were demolished. Chuwit was accused of having masterminded this action to get rid of unwanted tenants. In an interview in 2004, he admitted to having paid police to carry out the raid, but when they later demanded more money he refused. He was acquitted of all charges related to the raid in July 2006.

In the late 2017, this park was closed by Chuwit Kamolvisit sold this land to Land and Houses with a value of 5,000 million baht.
