= Apirak Kosayodhin =

Thai politician and business executive

- อภิรักษ์ โกษะโยธิน
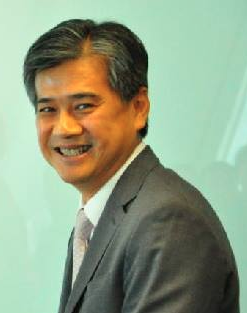
- Apirak Kosayodhin in 2012

14th Governor of Bangkok
- In office 29 August 2004 – 19 November 2008
- Preceded by: Samak Sundaravej
- Succeeded by: Sukhumbhand Paribatra

Personal details
- Born: March 30, 1961 (age 65) Nonthaburi, Thailand
- Party: Democrat
- Spouse: Patima Kosayodhin
- Education: Chiang Mai University
- Profession: Politician

Apirak Kosayodhin (Thai: อภิรักษ์ โกษะโยธิน; RTGS: Aphirak Kosayothin, born March 30, 1961) is a Thai former business executive and former governor of Bangkok. In the gubernatorial elections on August 29, 2004 he won with 40% of the votes. He was re-elected on October 6, 2008, in the gubernatorial elections with 45% of the vote, but he resigned a month later after being indicted on charges of corruption.

After the resignation, he became an advisor to Prime Minister of Thailand, Abhisit Vejjajiva. In December 2010, he became the 2nd Bangkok district Member of Parliament, with 69% of the vote. After the 2011 National Election, he became the 8th Party-list MP of the Democrats Party of Thailand. He also became the deputy-leader of the Party and the Shadow Minister of Commerce.

Born in Nonthaburi in a Thai Chinese family, he studied at Triam Udom Suksa School and Chiang Mai University, where he received a bachelor's degree in Food Science and Technology in 1983. Beginning his professional career at the Thai branch of Pizza Hut, he worked at several companies as manager and director. 2002–2004 he was among other posts CEO of TA Orange (currently known as True Move) and member of the Board of Directors of the Stock Exchange of Thailand.

== Governor of Bangkok ==
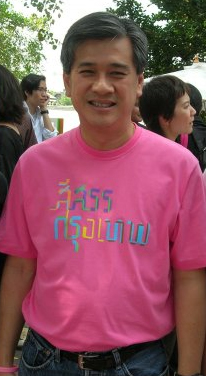
Apirak at a campaign

In 2004 the Democrat Party nominated him as their candidate for the Bangkok governor election, which he won gaining 40% of all votes. Paveena Hongsakul, an independent candidate with the unofficial support of the ruling Thai Rak Thai party, came in second-place with 16% of the vote.

Critics have noted the lack of tangible impact Apirak had in his role as city governor. Some policies, for instance "smart" traffic signs and bus stops flopped and his Bus Rapid Transit (BRT) project has yet to come into service. However, he was lauded for being able to push the extension of BTS Skytrain routes, which are currently under construction. Another notable project Apirak was successful in implementing is the Bangkok Art and Culture Centre at Pathumwan intersection which opened in 2008.

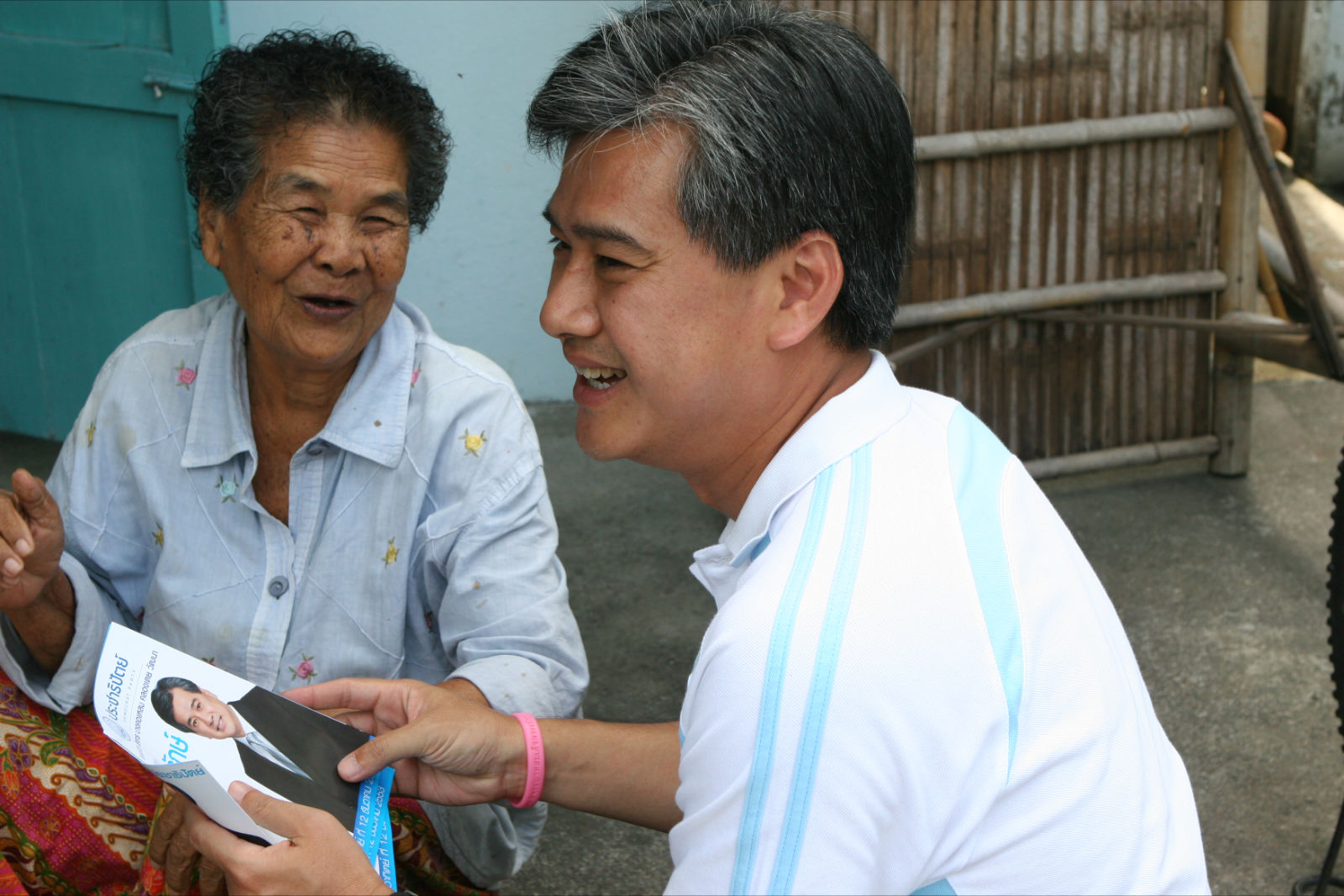
Apirak meeting villagers

After two years in office, poll respondents gave him high marks for diligence and dedication to work. But he received his lowest marks for seeing projects through to completion. His traffic and transport initiatives also received flunking marks. Overall, 57% of Bangkokians felt he had met expectations.

Apirak's so-called smart taxi stops were met with derision. The 150 stops that were in operation by October 2005 looked like bus stops. If people were waiting, a red light became visible to nearby cabs. If no taxis passed by, would-be passengers could press a button and a call centre would direct cabs to the stand. A BMA study found the stops had a success rate of only 38.6%. Although 189,549 smart taxis had been hailed, the study showed that only 73,168 stopped to pick up passengers. Many stops stood empty and unused. However, Apirak's smart traffic signs have been a mild success, giving motorists more information about traffic conditions ahead and is mild relief from the stress of driving in the city.

The military junta's Assets Examination Committee (AEC) did not charge Apirak over the controversial purchase of fire-fighting equipment for the city. Sithichok Rawdkrutha, an AEC member, lodged a complaint with AEC Chairman Nam Yimyaem over the decision and noted that he suspected Apirak of dereliction of duty or malfeasance for giving the nod to the purchase, for which he allegedly received 500 million baht in kickbacks. Apirak has protested his innocence by pointing to the fact that the deal was originally signed by the former Bangkok governor Samak Sundaravej. Apirak claims to have been forced by the ex-governor's agreement to continue the project.

== Re-election ==
Despite the hanging allegations Apirak won re-election on the October 5, 2008 with 45% of the vote or 991,018 of the votes cast.

== Resignation ==
On November 11, 2008 the National Counter Corruption Commission announced that Apirak was indicted together with other officials including former Governor and Prime Minister Samak. On the 13 Apirak announced in front of television cameras his resignation saying: "Like the Democrat Party, I support a move that will perpetuate politics-for-people," he continued "I have complete confidence in my innocence. I am ready to see my case go through the judicial system. I am confident that I will receive justice in the end,". Abhisit Vejjajiva Leader of the Democrat party was quoted saying: "Apirak's decision set a standard many people want to see in Thai politics. It's praiseworthy and he deserves moral support from society," His resignation immediately set out a by-election for the next governor. Currently he is a close adviser to PM Abhisit Vejjajiva.

== Court's ruling ==
Then on September 10, 2013, the Supreme Court's Criminal Division for Person Holding Political Position ruled that Mr.Apirak is found not guilty, on the ground that Mr.Apirak had followed all the procedure stated in the contract which came into force before he came into the office. Afterward he re-negotiated with the contractor and was able to save Bangkok Administration in the amount of 250 million bahts.

== Advisor to the Prime Minister ==
After his resignation from the Bangkok Governor position, Mr. Apirak became the advisor to Prime Minister Abhisit Vejjajiva, from Democrats Party of Thailand. He played an important part in many policies, such as relieving the Thai economic during the 2008-2012 global recessions, “Moving Thailand Forward” project, decentralizing power to the local offices and government, Creative Economy project, and push forward the “Social Enterprise” businesses. Moreover, Mr. Apirak was entrusted by the Prime Minister to relieve the flood and political unrest victims in 2010.

== Member of the Parliament of Thailand ==
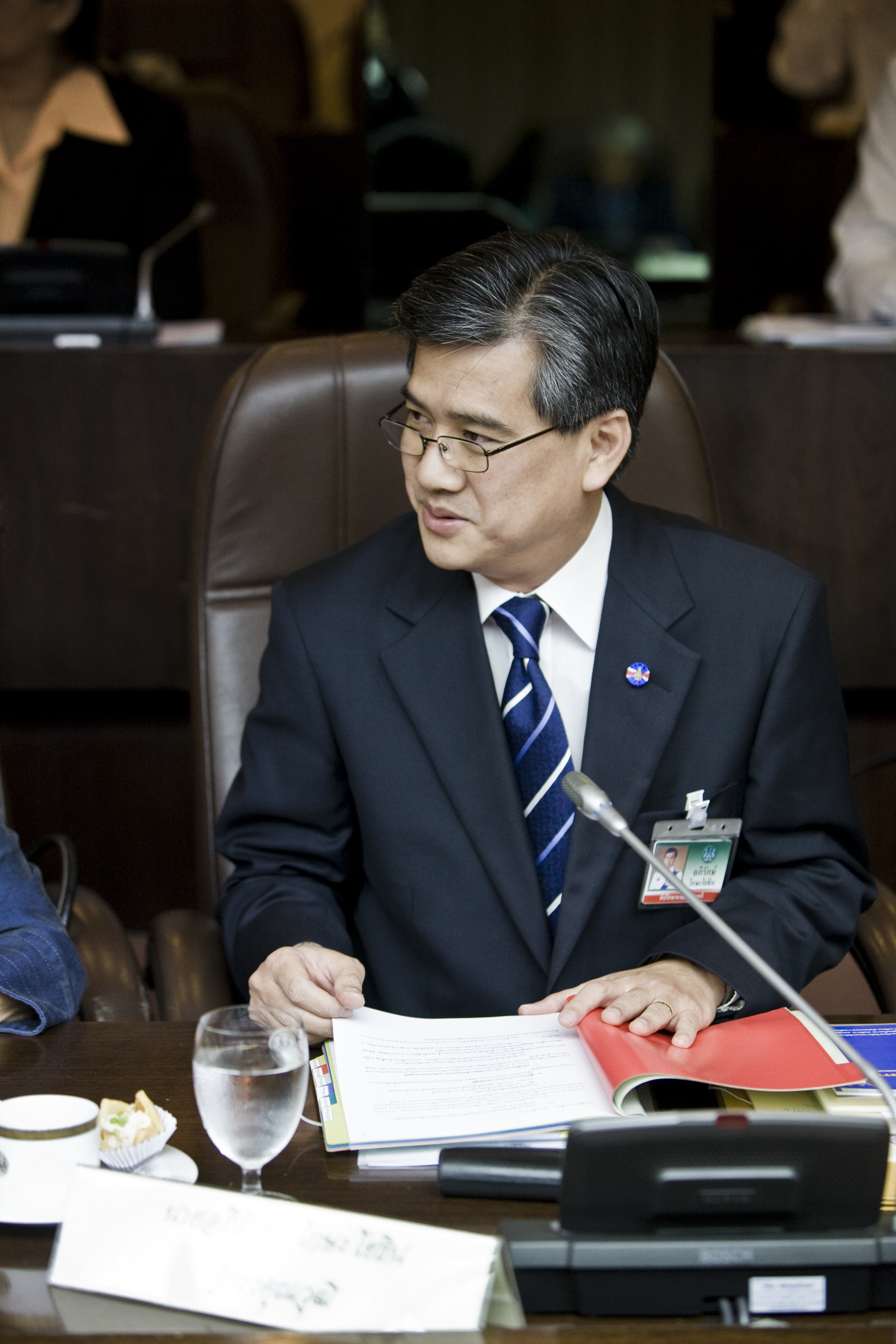
Apirak as MP in 2008

In December 2010, Mr. Apirak ran for the seat of district 2 Bangkok MP (Member of the Parliament) for the Democrats Party of Thailand. As a result, Mr. Apirak won with 71,072 votes (68.67% of the voter turnout) on December 12, 2010.

=== Thai National Election 2011 ===
Prime Minister Abhisit Vejjajiva dissolved the Parliament in May 2011, which leads to a National-wide election in Thailand. As a deputy-leader of Democrats Party of Thailand, Mr. Apirak was entrusted by the party to overlook the election campaign in Bangkok, the capital of Thailand. Although the election result ended with a victory for the Pheu Thai Party (265-159) national wide, Democrats Party of Thailand had a successful campaign in Bangkok with a victory of 23–10.

=== Post-Election 2011 ===
Mr. Apirak became the 8th Party-list MP of the Democrats Party of Thailand. He was also reelected by the Party's members to become a deputy leader of the Party. Once the Shadow Cabinet is formed by Democrats Party of Thailand, Mr. Apirak is appointed as the Shadow Minister of Commerce, mainly overseeing the cost of living and consumer economy of the people.

== 2011 floods ==
In September–December 2011, Thailand faced the worst flood crisis in its history with 65 provinces and 16 million people were affected, along with 815 fatalities. Mr. Apirak and Democrats Party of Thailand, with the help of Seni Pramoj Foundation, set up Asa-Thai (Thai volunteer) group to help aid and relieve the flood victims all over the country. By the end of the Flood Crisis, Asa-Thai was able to send aid to 31 provinces including 130,000 relief bags and 4,500,000 meal boxes, and set up two emergency shelters.

On March 3, 2013 he participated at the 2013 Bangkok governor election.

== Royal decorations ==
- 2011 – Knight Grand Cordon (Special Class) of The Most Exalted Order of the White Elephant
- 2008 – Knight Grand Cordon (Special Class) of The Most Noble Order of the Crown of Thailand
- 2005 – Member (Fifth Class) of The Most Admirable Order of the Direkgunabhorn
- 2004 – The Boy Scout Citation Medal (1st Class)

Political offices
| Preceded by Samak Sundaravej | Governor of Bangkok; 2004–2008 | Succeeded by M.R. Sukhumbhand Paribatra |
