= Kriengsak Chareonwongsak =

Thai scholar and politician

Kriengsak Chareonwongsak

Kriengsak Chareonwongsak is a Thai scholar and politician. He established the first futures studies research institute in Southeast Asia, was a member of Thailand's House of Representatives, was on the executive board of the Democrat Party, and has published on scholarly and popular topics.

== Early life and education ==
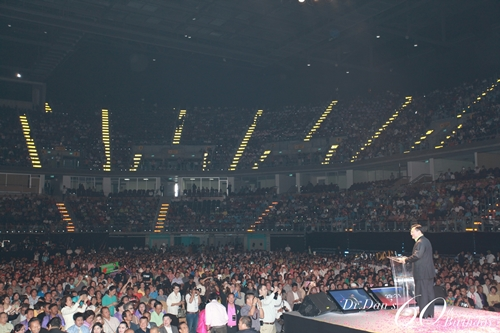
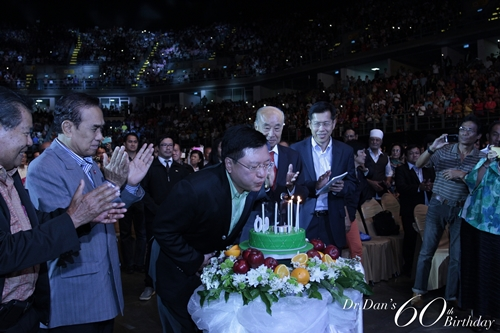
The Siam Civil Society observed Chareonwongsak's 60th birthday on September 6, 2015, at Impact, Muang Thong Thani.

Chareonwongsak was born in Bangkok. After finishing high school at the New Berlin High School in Wisconsin on a one-year American Field Service (AFS) scholarship, he received bachelor's and PhD degrees in economics from Monash University in Melbourne, Australia. He received a Master of Public Administration degree from the Harvard Kennedy School, a master's degree from Cambridge Judge Business School, and completed postdoctoral studies at the University of Oxford.

== Institute of Future Studies for Development ==
Chareonwongsak founded the Institute of Future Studies for Development (IFD), a non-profit Thai academic research organization, in 1994. The IFD emphasizes sustainable solutions for future problems in Thai society, and has worked for changes in Thailand's banking, finance, governance, and education. It focuses on research activities and organizes and hosts seminars, academic conferences, and forums for Thai intellectuals and policy-makers, publishing its findings in newspapers, magazines, and academic journals.

== Writing ==
Chareonwongsak writes on education policy, business, politics and governance, policy formation, organization restructuring, theories of change, environment, future studies, and social enterprise. He has published a number of books, presented over 500 academic papers, and has written 5,000 newspaper and magazine articles. Chareonwongsak is a radio and TV commentator and a newspaper and magazine columnist on political and economic issues.

== Academic career ==
Chareonwongsak is a member of the Education Council on Standard and Quality Assurance of the Office of the National Education Commission, and was elected to the Harvard Kennedy School Alumni Association board of directors. He is a research professor at Regent University and a member of the business-administration advisory board of the University of the People.

== Political career ==
Chareonwongsak was a member of the National Economic and Social Advisory Council (NESAC) as Chair of the Education, Religion, Arts and Culture Commission and Vice Chair of the Economic, Commerce and Industry Commission. A member of the Democrat Party, he was elected to the National Assembly in 2004 and served until the assembly's 2006 dissolution after the 2006 coup.

Chareonwongsak ran as a party-list member in the elections for the Democrat Party in 2005, and resigned from the party two years later. In 2008, he ran as an independent candidate in the 2008 Bangkok gubernatorial election and finished fourth.
