= Rak Thailand Party =

Rak Thailand Party พรรครักประเทศไทย Love Thailand Party
- Leader: Chuwit Kamolvisit
- Secretary-General: Suphatsara Narayam
- Founded: 18 February 2010
- Dissolved: 11 April 2019
- Headquarters: Khlong Toei, Bangkok, Thailand
- Ideology: Conservative liberalism Nationalism
- Political position: Centre-right

Website
- http://www.chuvitonline.com

The Rak Thailand Party (Thai: พรรครักประเทศไทย, Phak Rak Prathet Thai, English: Love Thailand Party) was a political party in Thailand. It was founded in 2011, by Chuwit Kamolvisit, a major massage parlor owner.

In campaign for the 2011 general election, the party was noted for its anti-corruption and protest canvass, presenting leader Chuwit as the "Angry Man". Eventually and to Chuwit's own surprise, the party won 3.07% of the party-list votes and could occupy four of the 500 seats in the House of Representatives. The party's MPs sat on the opposition benches, together with their colleagues, the Democrats. The Election Commission dissolved the party on 11 April 2019.
