= 2008 Bangkok gubernatorial election =

Eighth gubernatorial election for the city of Bangkok, Thailand

- 5 October 2008
- Turnout: 54.18%
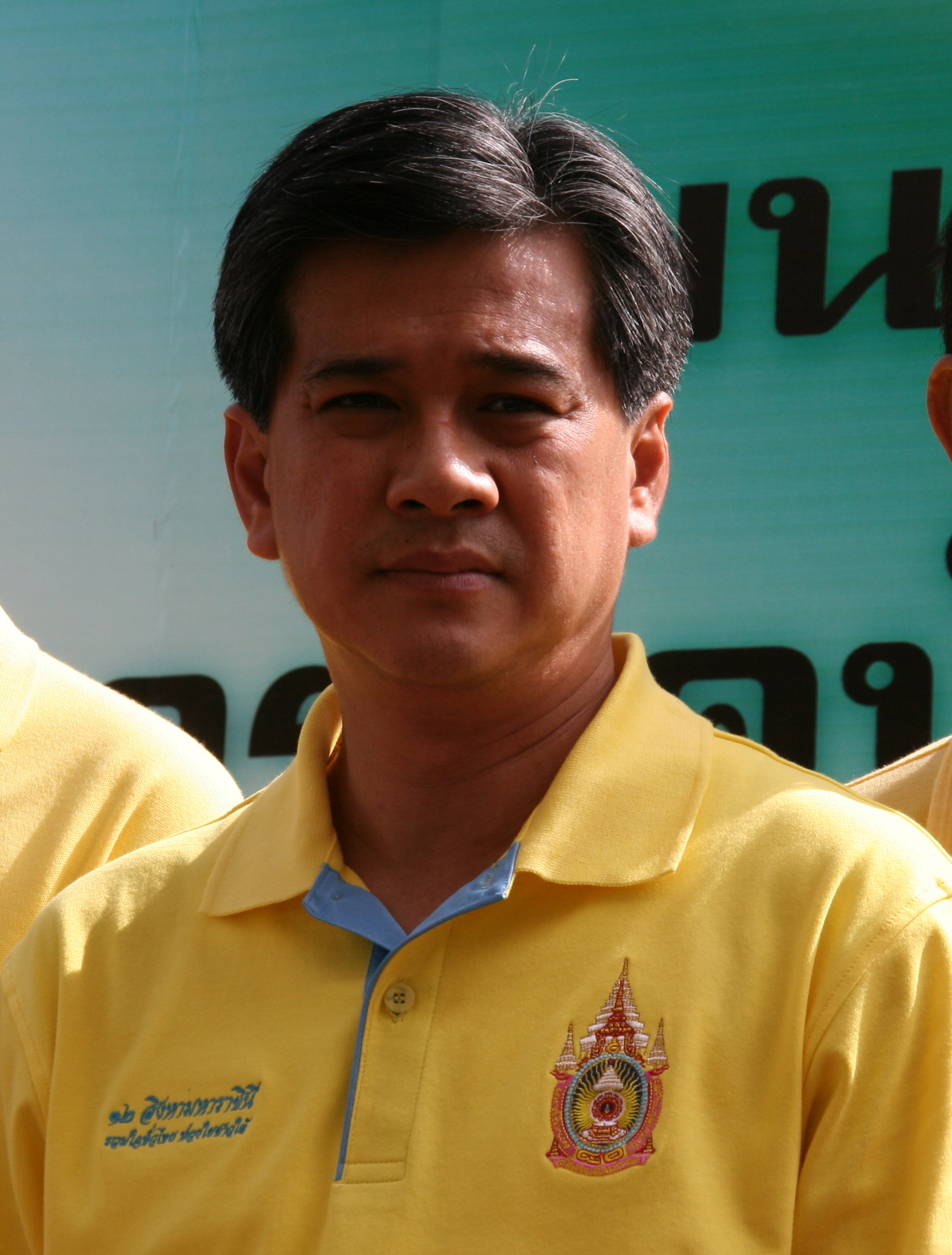

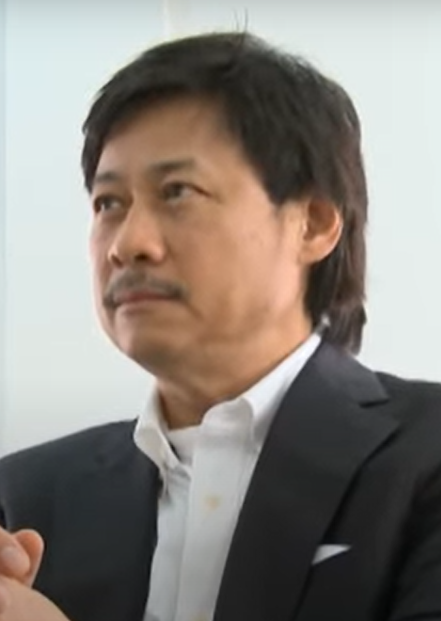

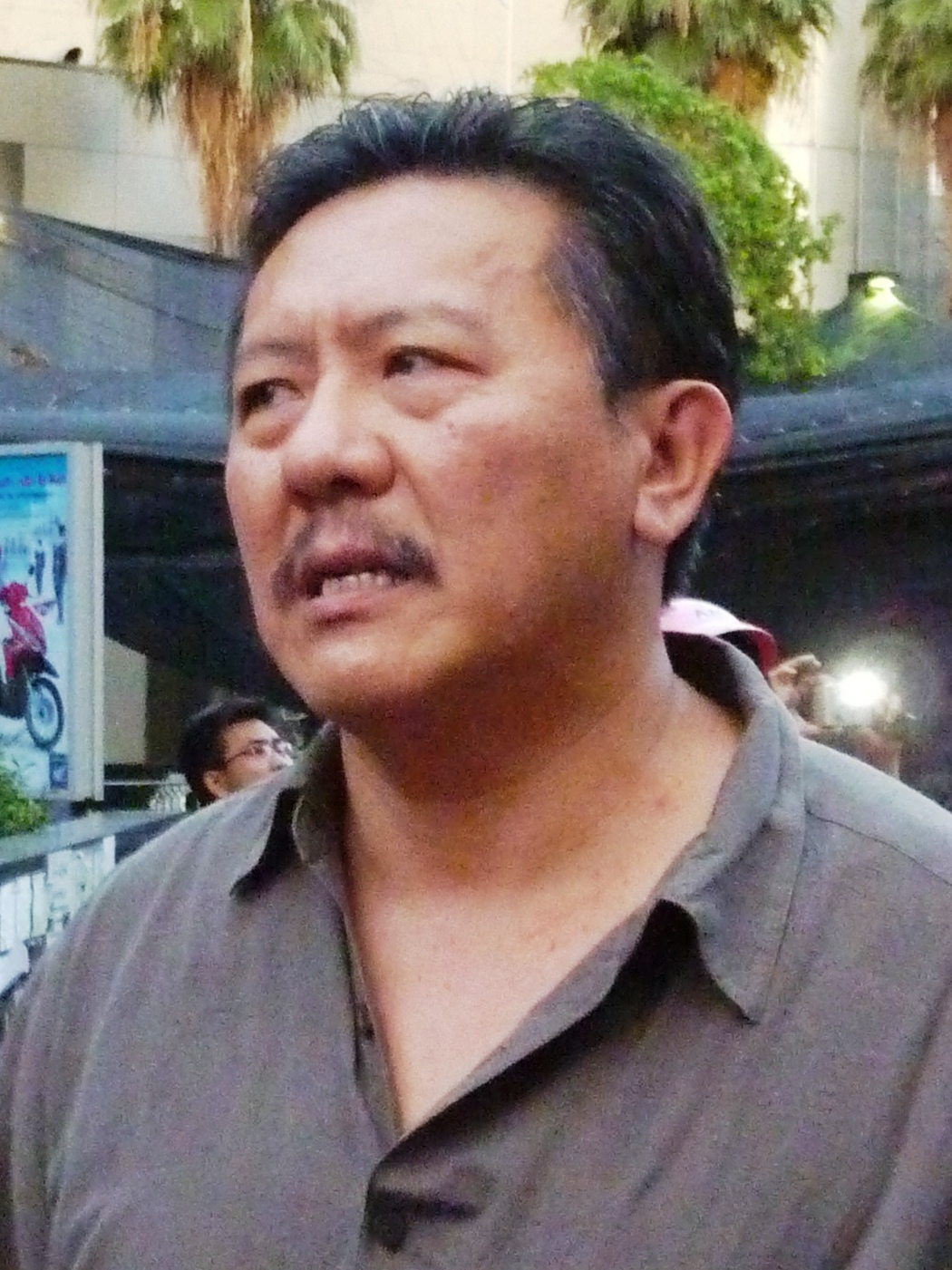
Candidate	Apirak Kosayothin	Prapas Chongsa-nguan
Party	Democrat	People's Power
Popular vote	991,018	543,488
Percentage	45.93%	25.19%
Candidate	Chuwit Kamolvisit	Kriengsak Chareonwongsak
Party	Independent	Independent
Popular vote	340,616	260,051
Percentage	15.79%	12.05%
- Gubernatorial election results map. Blue denotes districts won by Apirak
Governor before election
Apirak Kosayothin
Democrat
Elected Governor
Apirak Kosayothin
Democrat

The 2008 Bangkok gubernatorial election was held on 5 October 2008, this was the eighth election for the governorship of Bangkok. The incumbent Democrat governor, Apirak Kosayothin, won the election, securing a second consecutive four-year term. Of a total of 4,087,329 eligible voters, 2,214,320 voted, giving a turnout rate of 54.18 percent, lower than the 70 percent target expected by the Election Committee.

Sixteen candidates contested the election. Apirak, candidate for the opposition Democrat Party, was seen as the favourite. Other candidates included Chuwit Kamolvisit, a former massage parlour businessman who also ran in the 2004 election, Prapas Chongsa-nguan, former governor of the Mass Rapid Transit Authority of Thailand and candidate for the People's Power Party, Kriengsak Chareonwongsak, an academic and professor in business administration, and Leena Jangjanja, a businesswoman and lawyer who ran in the previous election and the 2006 senate election.

The sixth elected governor of Bangkok, Apirak is the second to be elected to a second term, after Chamlong Srimuang, governor from 1985–1992, who was incidentally arrested at a polling station early on the election day, on charges of insurrection due to his role as leader of the People's Alliance for Democracy, a group which has staged protests and occupied Government House since August.

== Campaign ==
Apirak's four-year term as governor ended on 28 August 2008. Applications for the post were accepted from 1 to 5 September, and the official list of candidates was announced on 11 September. Campaigning included public speeches by candidates, television interviews, campaign trucks announcing messages through loudspeakers, and most noticeably, a multitude of campaign posters erected on the pavements, some of which fell over and injured pedestrians and motorcyclists.

The more unusual campaigning stunts included Leena's bathing in a canal to reflect the local population's experiences, which ended tragically when her campaign manager drowned. Nearer to the election day, Chuwit caused headline news by punching and kicking a television journalist after an interview.

Chuwit also filed complaints against Apirak, claiming that the appearance of Apirak's name on the Bangkok Metropolitan Administration's election publicity posters violated electoral law. The case was accepted by the Bangkok Election Committee, but a final ruling by the Election Commission would not be heard until after the election.

== Results ==
Polling was organised by the Bangkok Metropolitan Administration under the supervision of the Bangkok Election Commission, with a total budget of over 154 million baht. Voting took place from 08:00 to 15:00 on 5 October at 6,337 polling stations across the fifty districts of the city.

Exit polls by Assumption and Suan Dusit Rajabhat Universities indicated that Apirak had won 44 to 52 percent of the vote by the time the polling stations closed. The unofficial results, to be submitted to the Election Commission for approval, were announced by the Bangkok City Clerk on midnight.

Candidate	Party	Votes	%
Apirak Kosayodhin	Democrat Party	991,018	45.93
Prapas Chongsa-nguan	People's Power Party	543,488	25.19
Chuwit Kamolvisit	Independent	340,616	15.79
Kriengsak Chareonwongsak	Independent	260,051	12.05
Leena Jungjanja	Independent	6,267	0.29
Wittaya Jangkobpattana	Independent	3,759	0.17
Warawut Thanangkorn	Independent	2,771	0.13
Metta Temchamnarn	Metta Tham Group	2,105	0.10
Kittisak Thirawisit	Independent	2,102	0.10
Vachiraporn Aayooyuen	Public Party (Satharanachon)	1,140	0.05
Sumet Tanthanasirikul	Krung Thep Phatthana Team	1,078	0.05
Toranee Rithee-thamdamrong	Independent	852	0.04
Popsak Panseethong	Independent	811	0.04
Udom Viboonteppachat	Independent	617	0.03
Somchai Paiboon	Independent	503	0.02
Nipon Simprayoon	Independent	421	0.02
Total		2,157,599	100.00
Valid votes		2,157,599	97.44
Invalid votes		19,376	0.88
Blank votes		37,345	1.69
Total votes		2,214,320	100.00
Registered voters/turnout		4,087,239	54.18
Source: Bangkok Metropolitan Administration
