= Chuwit Kamolvisit =

Thai politician (born 1961)

- ชูวิทย์ กมลวิศิษฎ์
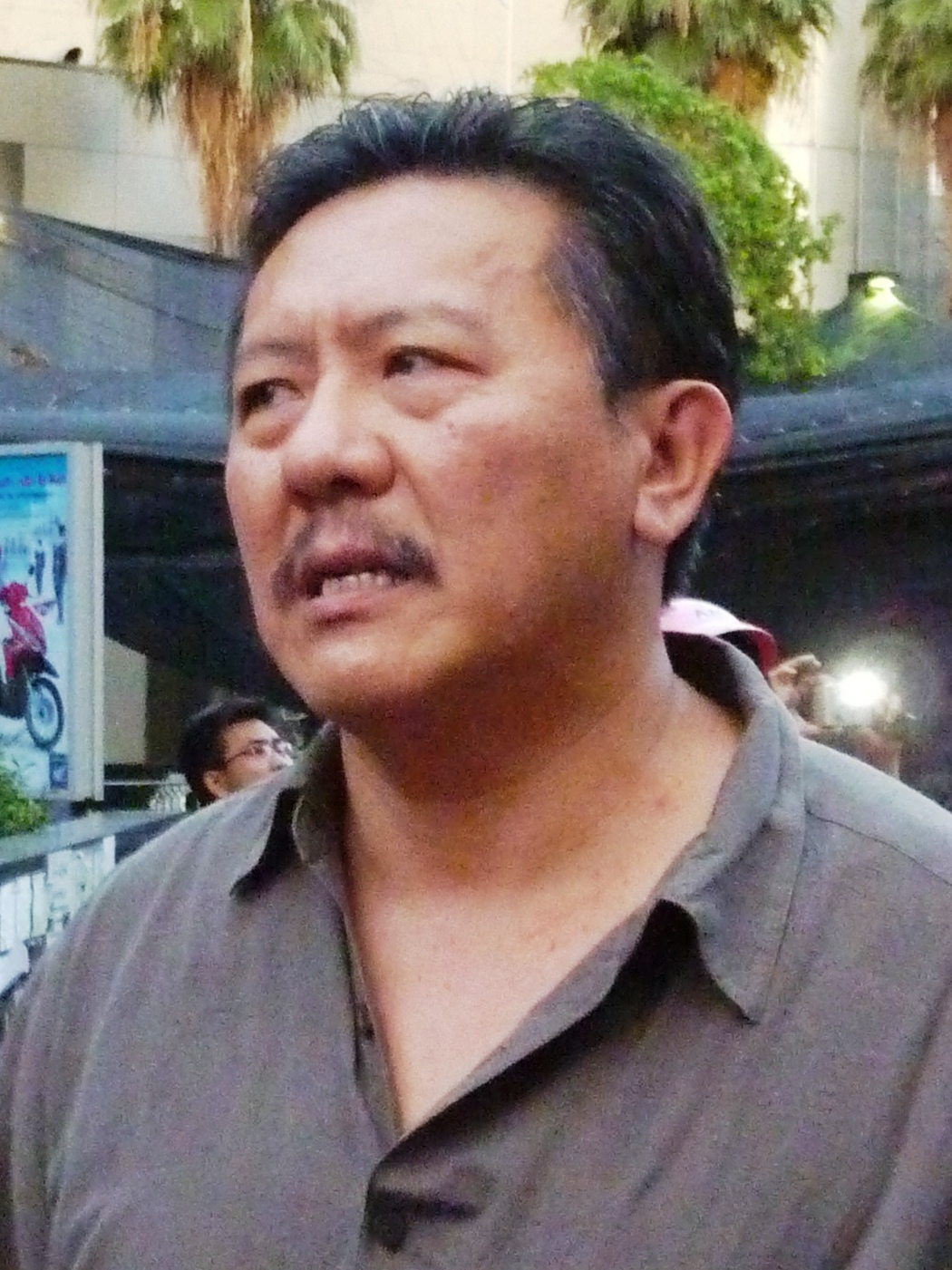
- Chuwit at post-arson CentralWorld on 20 May 2010 after the 2010 Thai military crackdown

Leader of Rak Thailand Party
- In office 18 February 2010 – 17 January 2017

Personal details
- Born: 29 August 1961 (age 64) British Hong Kong
- Party: Rak Thailand Party
- Other political affiliations: Thai Nation Party (until 2007)
- Spouses: Kate W. Johnson (div.); Ngamta Kamolvisit
- Children: Tontrakun Kamolvisit; Termtragoon Kamolvisit; Trakarnta Kamolvisit; Tortragoon Kamolvisit
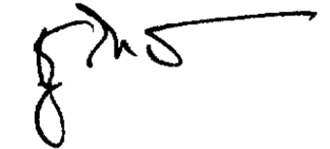
- Signature

Chuwit Kamolvisit (Thai: ชูวิทย์ กมลวิศิษฎ์; RTGS: Chuwit Kamonwisit; born 29 August 1961) is a controversial Thai politician who was once the country's biggest massage parlour owner, known as the "tub tycoon". After an arrest in 2003, he publicly claimed that he paid large bribes to many Thai police officers. He then sold some of his massage parlors, formed his own political party and unsuccessfully ran for Bangkok governor in August 2004. In 2005 he was elected for a four-year term to the Thai House of Representatives, but in 2006 the Constitutional Court removed him from parliament. In October 2008 he again ran for governor of Bangkok as an independent but was not elected. In the July 2011 general election his party won four seats in the House of Representatives. He used the pseudonym Davis Kamol on occasion.

== Early life and education ==
Born on 29 August 1961 in British Hong Kong to a Hong Kong-born, Thai Chinese father and a Thai mother. Chuwit grew up in a building (now Kiatnakin Phatra Bank, Yaowarat) along Yaowarat Road, or better known as Bangkok's Chinatown. His father was engaged in a clothing business and as a manufacturer of Thai jeans brand Hara including being the founder of the Cathay Department Store (now Tesco Lotus, Yaowarat).

He graduated from the Faculty of Commerce and Accountancy at Thammasat University, and then earned a Master of Business Administration degree at University of San Diego in San Diego, California, United States. Later, he also earned a Masters of Political Science (Politics and Governments) at Thammasat University.

== Business and allegations ==
Chuwit controls the Davis Group, a business that consists of six Bangkok massage parlours near Ratchadaphisek Road, which employ around 600 women each: Copacabana, Victoria's Secret, Honolulu, Hi Class, Emmanuelle, and Julianna. The massage parlours cater mainly to wealthy Thais and operate within a "grey area" of the law: massage parlors are legal, but prostitution is not. Prices are from 3,000 to 6,000 baht for a two-hour session. The Davis Group's holdings also include the Davis Bangkok Hotel, Thai villas and a shopping mall on Sukhumvit Road Soi 24., which is one of the most expensive areas in Bangkok.

=== "Sukhumvit Square" incident ===
In January 2003, Chuwit was accused of hiring around 600 men to raze several bars, shops, a laundry and a travel agency on "Sukhumvit Square", a plot of land he owns on Sukhumvit Soi 10. This was an apparent attempt to remove the low-rent tenants so that the land could be developed. The tenants believed they had valid leases from another company and were not notified of the raid, which took place early on a Sunday morning. Chuwit was arrested and spent a month in prison. He denied responsibility and was finally released on bail.

The police, whom he says he had bribed an average US$160,000 a month over 10 years, refused to protect him, so he went public, releasing the names of the top officers, the sums they were paid, and their frequent visits to his six massage parlors. He also claimed that "VIP" policemen received free service in his parlours, an allegation that was later confirmed in interviews with some of the masseuses. Following an investigation, several prominent policemen were suspended or demoted. Chuwit also accused his prison wardens of corruption, as they accepted bribes from him.

Shortly after his corruption revelations, Chuwit disappeared for two days. He later claimed he was abducted and abused by police; however, others believe he had staged his own disappearance. Chuwit's massage parlours were then raided and some of his bank accounts were frozen. He was also charged with procuring minors for prostitution because three masseuses under the age of 18 were found working in one of his parlours. He was acquitted in June 2004, as the court found the girls had used forged ID cards and Chuwit was not held responsible. During the same month, Chuwit sold three of his parlours, saying that police harassment had made operations difficult for him.

In a February 2004 interview, Chuwit claimed that he had paid Thai policemen to clear his Sukhumvit Soi 10 property. When the issue became public, the police allegedly demanded more money, which he refused to pay. They turned against him, and he revealed his bribe payments as a response.

In July 2006, after a three-year trial, Chuwit and 130 associates were acquitted of the razing charges; however, a corporate lawyer was sentenced to eight months in prison for paying army engineers to destroy the businesses. Chuwit converted the area on Sukhumvit Soi 10 into a public park named "Chuvit Garden" for about 100 million baht.

Chuvit Garden covers a total area of 7 rai or 2.7 acres, it is the last large empty parcel of land in the Sukhumvit area. In 2018, the land alone is estimated to be worth more than US$228 million or 7.2 billion Thai Baht

== Political career ==
In September 2003, Chuwit formed his own political party, called First Thai Nation. In April 2004 he announced that he was running for governor of Bangkok. He planned to spend about 20 million baht on his campaign, with corruption in the police and government as his main campaign topic. The Bangkok governor elections were held on 29 August 2004, Chuwit's 43rd birthday. He placed third, with some 300,000 votes, or about 16 percent of the vote. However, in the 2005 legislative elections, Chuwit merged his party with the conservative Chart Thai Party. He ran successfully as a party list candidate, becoming a member of parliament. In May 2005 he began hosting a weekly call-in radio show, during which he listened to complaints from the public. In January 2006, however, the Constitutional Court revoked his MP status. A candidate must be a member of a political party for at least 90 days before the general election and the court found that Chuwit had not joined Chart Thai in time.

During the 2008 Bangkok gubernatorial election, he again declared his candidacy for governor of Bangkok. As was the case in 2004, he placed third, gaining 14% of the vote. He admitted that his campaign may have suffered when he punched a reporter in the face for allegedly describing Chuwit as "unmanly". In May 2011 Chuwit formed a new political party, "Love Thailand" (Rak Prathetthai). In the 2011 Thai general election, the party won four seats in the House of Representatives. He had campaigned as a protest candidate and anti-corruption watchdog. In September 2012, the Bangkok Post published an audio recording of a lecture given by Chuwit at Hatyai University in southern Thailand. Chuwit spoke to the students about how Thai police make money from the sex industry, and the Post noted that the topic is "a subject not normally taught in university courses."

Chuwit has been critical of Prayut Chan-o-cha's handling of the COVID-19 pandemic since the outbreak of a third wave in April 2021, which originated from the nightlife area, Thong Lor. He also criticised the government of failing to buy enough vaccines. His criticism would later cause Thanakorn Wangboonkongchana to show a better understanding of the situation.

== Vigilante career ==
Since 2022, Chuwit became a vigilante against corruption in Thai society. On 9 February 2023, Chuwit accused Police Lieutenant colonel Wasawat Mukkarasakul of corruption on Facebook. He accused Wasawat of running Thailand's largest online gambling ring, where he accepted bribes worth tens of thousands of bahts. He also accused Wasawat of laundering money whilst he was the director of ten companies. The following day, Wasawat was suspended from his duty.

== Personal life ==
Chuwit was previously married to Kate Johnson, but later divorced her. He then remarried Ngamta Sukniran, with whom he has four children together. His daughter, Trakarnta (Thaia) Kamolvisit studied at Millfield School, United Kingdom; and graduated with a degree in economics from University of San Francisco.

In 2023, he revealed that he had terminal liver cancer and had traveled to England for treatment.

== See also ==
- Prostitution in Thailand
