= 2000 Bangkok gubernatorial election =

- 23 July 2000
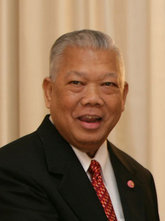

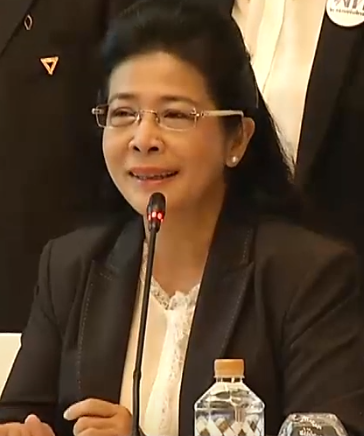

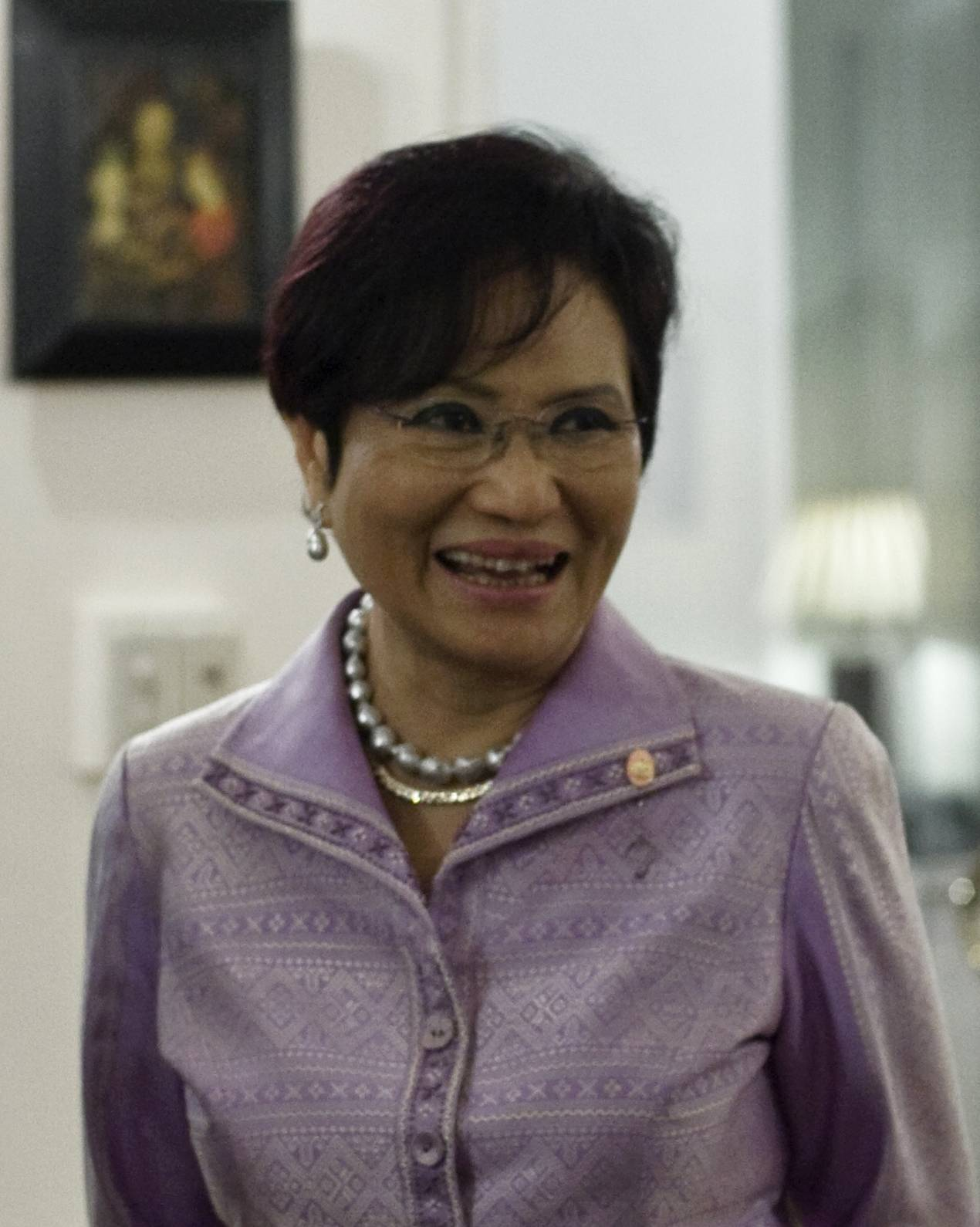

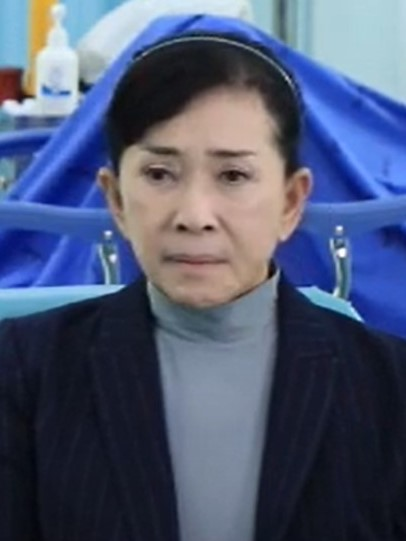
Candidate	Samak Sundaravej	Sudarat Keyuraphan	Thawatchai Sajakul
Party	Thai Citizen	Thai Rak Thai	Democrat
Popular vote	1,016,096	800,513	247,650
Percentage	45.85%	23.52%	11.17%
Candidate	Winai Sompong	Kalaya Sophonpanich	Paveena Hongsakul
Party	Kon Rak Mueang Luang	Krung Thep Sodsai	National Development
Popular vote	145,641	132,608	116,750
Percentage	6.57%	5.98%	5.27%
Governor before election
Bhichit Rattakul
Independent
Elected Governor
Samak Sundaravej
Thai Citizen

The 2000 Bangkok gubernatorial election was the sixth election for the governorship of Bangkok, and was held on 23 July 2000. The election saw the independent candidate, Samak Sundaravej, beat the Thai Rak Thai candidate, Sudarat Keyuraphan. The election also saw Samak become the first candidate in a Bangkok gubernatorial election to reach more than a million votes, which he did with a total 1,016,096 votes. The election took place before the 2001 Thai general election.

Throughout the campaign before the election, Sudarat and Samak led in popularity ahead of the Democrat candidate, Thawatchai Sajakul.

== Candidates ==
The election was contested by 23 candidates.

Number	Party	Name
7	Thai Citizen Party	Samak Sundaravej
5	Thai Rak Thai	Sudarat Keyuraphan
13	Democrat	Thawatchai Sajakul
