= Teerapat Sajakul =

Thai actor and singer

- ธีรภัทร์ สัจจกุล
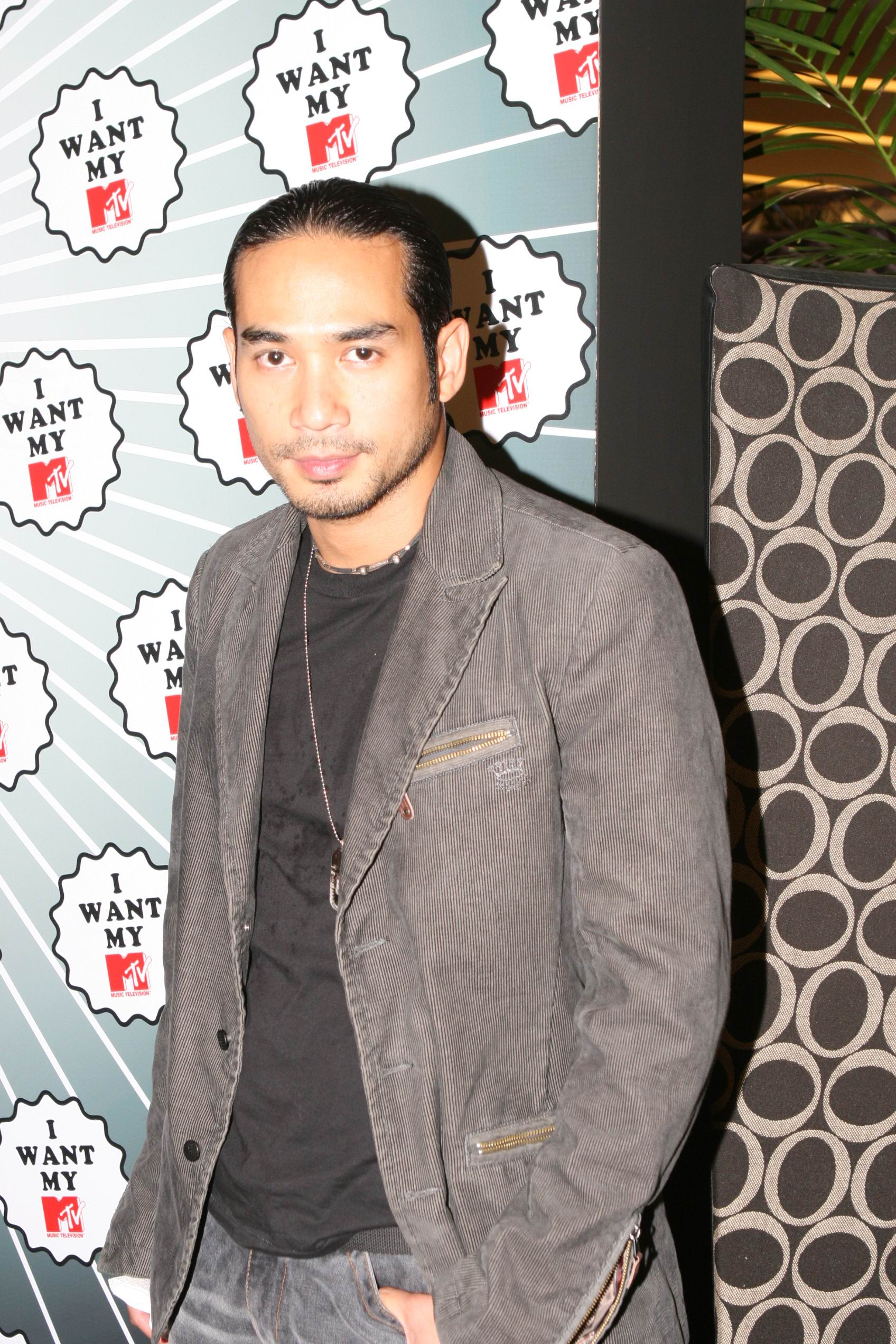
- Born: 22 July 1973 (age 53); Bangkok, Thailand
- Other name: Tui (ตุ้ย)
- Education: Bachelor of Economics, Thammasat University
- Occupations: Actor; singer; businessman
- Years active: 1997-present
- Known for: Crossing The Ocean (1999); Mia Luang (2009); Fa Charot Sai (2013)
- Height: 1.77 m (5 ft 9 1/2 in)
- Spouse: Natasha Plienwithi (m. 2008; div. 2019)
- Children: 1
- Parents: Wanasthana Sajakul (father); Supatra Sajakul (mother)
- Relatives: Kritsada Sajakul (brother); Sorn (sister)

Teerapat Sajakul (Thai: ธีรภัทร์ สัจจกุล; RTGS: Thiraphat Satchakun), nickname Tui (ตุ้ย), is a Thai actor and singer. He is also the chief executive for SEED 97.5 FM, one of the most popular radio stations run by MCOT.

== Filmography ==
Films
Year	Title	Role	Notes	Notes #2	With
1997	Sunset at Chaophraya	Wanat	Supporting Role	Thailand	Apasiri Nitibhon
2010	My Best Bodyguard	Chet	Supporting Role	Thailand	
2013	A Stranger in Paradise	Police Captain	Supporting Role	Hollywood	
2016	One Day	Top	Supporting Role	Thailand	Nittha Jirayungyurn
2018	Red Cargo	TBD	Supporting Role	Hollywood	
2021	The Serpent (TV series)	Interpol Lieutenant Colonel Sompol Suthimai	Supporting Role	BBC	
2022	Thirteen Lives	Captain Arnont	Supporting Role	Hollywood	
2022	The Lake	James	Lead Role	Thai monster film	Sushar Manaying

== Television ==
=== TV Series ===
Television
Year	Title	Role	Network	Notes	With
1999	Crossing The Ocean	Thiangwan	Channel 7, Thailand	Lead Role	Suvanant Kongying
2000	Morasum Haeng Chiwit	Phasma	Channel 7, Thailand	Lead Role	Patcharapa Chaichua
2000	Phanthai Norasing	Sin	Channel 7, Thailand	Lead Role	Phiyada Jutharattanakul
2001	Maya	Rachanna Surenthon	Channel 7, Thailand	Lead Role	Sonia Couling Napakpapha Nakprasitte
2003	Si Phaen Din	Khun Prem	Channel 9, Thailand	Lead Role	Siriyakorn Pukkavesh
2006	Nai Fan	Prince Oritsawatthana	Channel 9, Thailand	Lead Role	Sara Malakul Lane
2009	Mia Luang	Doctor Anirut	Channel 7, Thailand	Lead Role	Piyathida Mitrteeraroj Patcharapa Chaichua
2013	Fa Charot Sai	Charip Anfarat	Channel 7, Thailand	Lead Role	Usamanee Waitayanon
2015	Unending Desire	Pathawi	Channel 7, Thailand	Lead Role	Usamanee Waitayanon
2016	Rang Mai Huachai Doem	Kwin Hiranthakan	One 31, Thailand	Lead Role	Wannarot Sonthichai
2016	Chueak Wiset Series	Wiwan	GMM25, Thailand	Lead Role	
2017	Sri Ayodhaya	Rama I	True, Thailand	Supporting Role	
2018	Club Friday the Series 9	Ae	GMM25, Thailand	Lead Role	Piyathida Mitrteeraroj
2018	Mueang Maya Live	Kitikon	One 31, Thailand	Lead Role	
2024	Don't Come Home	Yuthachai	Netflix	Supporting Role	

== Discography ==
- Albums TEERAPAT (2001) with GMM Grammy
- Albums Phleng Man Pha Pai (2003) with GMM Grammy
