= Nitiphumthanat Ming-rujiralai =

Thai politician and newspaper columnist

- นิติภูมิธณัฐ มิ่งรุจิราลัย
- Born: Boonchuay Youprom; 5 June 1960 (age 66); Trat, Thailand
- Education: Ramkhamhaeng University; Thammasat University; Moscow State University (Ph.D.)
- Occupations: Politician; columnist; business owner; policeman; university lecturer
- Children: Natipoom; Mathavi; Nitinagin; Phanwalai; Kasamon; Jattari; Nodthaleudee
- Parents: Ming Youprom; Chean Youprom
- Police career
- Rank: Police Captain
- Website: http://www.facebook.com/nitiphumthanat1959

Nitiphumthanat Ming-rujiralai (Thai: นิติภูมิธณัฐ มิ่งรุจิราลัย; born 5 June 1960) is a Thai politician and newspaper columnist.

== Early life ==
He was born on 5 June 1960 in Trat Province but brought up in Chantaburi Province. It is believed that in his ancestral line that there is one man from India and a woman from China. His great grandmother was a Chinese lady whose surname was Li.

On 15 September 2016 the Most Venerable Somdet Phra Wannarat, Abbot of Wat Bowonniwet Vihara who was also born in Trat, changed his name from Nitipoom Navaratna (นิติภูมิ นวรัตน์) to Nitiphumthanat Ming-rujiralai in order to continue the legacy of his late father Mr. Ming.

== Education ==
Nitiphumthanat studied at Wat Sueng Lang School (Buddhist Temple School) in Khlung district, also at Sriharuthai Catholic School and Khlung Ratchadapisek School. He moved to Trattrakankhun School, Trat Province and to Benchamarachuthit School, Chantaburi Province. He also spent one year as a Rotary youth exchange student at St. Arnaud High School (now known as St. Arnaud Secondary College) in rural Victoria, Australia.

Nitiphumthanat graduated bachelor's degree from the department of International Relations, Faculty of Political science, Ramkhamhaeng University, master's degree in Public administration, Thammasat University and doctorate (Ph.D) in History from the Institute of Asian and African studies (ISSA), Moscow State University. His Ph D dissertation was titled ‘Changes and developments in political views of military governments of Burma in 1962 – 1997’ which he wrote and defended in English and was translated into Russian.

From 2005 Nitiphumthanat devoted 10 years of his life to studying at six of the most prestigious colleges in the country. Firstly, he attended the Royal Thai Army War College (Batch 51), a college which admits only army personnel with a rank of colonel or above, where he studied for one full-time year. He graduated with distinction after writing his thesis "The Instilling of Virtue and Morality in the Socialist Republic of Vietnam". He then studied at the National Justice Academy (Batch 11) for a year where his graduation thesis was entitled "Law related to power of duty of the city law enforcement officers in Bangkok Metropolitan Administration. The study is focused on the law related to supervision of construction works and ensuring order of the city".

He is also a graduate of the Capital Market Academy (Batch 5) where senior officers from banks, listed companies and high government officials hone their leadership skills. He also attended the National College of the Interior (Batch 57), an institution which trains civil servants and officials to be provincial governors. Subsequently, he attended the Police College (Batch 31) which prepares police colonels for the rank of major general and to become provincial commanders. He then went on to study at the renowned National Defence College of Thailand (Batch 2555) and the Political and Electoral Development Institute (Batch 5). He is one of the few people in the country who has studied at all six of these most prestigious institutions in Thailand.

== Civil service career ==
When Nitiphumthanat returned to Thailand from Australia, he served for the Cooperative Promotion Department on the Thai-Cambodian border before establishing Balance Tutor Moo, a private tutoring school, in Bangkok. In 1985 he became 2nd lieutenant in the Border Patrol Police operating on the Thai-Myanmar border. In 1991 he was offered a scholarship in the Soviet Union to pursue his doctorate degree and he later resigned from the Royal Thai Police with the rank of captain.

== Teaching and inspirational speaking ==
In 1982 Nitiphumthanat founded a Tutoring School named, Balance Tutor Moo, which quickly became one of the most popular Tutor Schools at that time. From 1982 till now there have been in excess of 100,000 students who have enrolled for courses. Nitiphumthanat was also the Director of Asian and African Studies, Martin de Tours School of Management and Economic at Assumption University of Thailand from 9 August 2003 – 31 May 2015. When time permitted, he also accepted public speaking engagements in every province in Thailand.

== Mass media figure ==
In 1996, Mr Saengchai Sunthornwat, the International Affairs columnist for Thai Rath newspaper, was murdered. At that time, he was the most popular columnist in Thailand and the "magnet" of the newspaper, which had a circulation of more than one million. The public eagerly awaited the appointment of his successor and after a nine-month hiatus, Nitiphumthanat was offered and accepted the position as Thai Rath's new International Affairs columnist, a role he has now held for more than twenty years. In 2001, he became the owner and host of Perd Lens Song Lok (Open Lens Look at the World), a documentary program featuring his travels to over 100 countries, broadcast on Channel 3. These documentaries have opened trade and investment in Thailand and have received numerous media awards.

== Political career ==
In 2006, Nitiphumthanat ran for the Senatorial Election in Bangkok. He received the most votes amongst the candidates. Mr Samak Sundaravej, who later became Prime Minister of Thailand came in second. The former Speaker of the Parliament and other Ministers also received fewer votes than Nitiphumthanat. Even though he received the highest number of votes in the Kingdom, he was unable to take up his position because of the 2006 army coup d'état. After the coup, Nitiphumthanat was appointed by the King, on the advice of the Council of National Security to the National Legislative Assembly (NLA). He served in many important positions in the Assembly.

In 2008 Nitiphumthanat was the Party Leader of the Suvarnabhumi Party for 1 year. When he resigned from the leadership, the Party stopped all activities.

In 2011 he was invited to join the Pheu Thai Party and was elected as an M.P. During his term, he served as the First Deputy Chair on the House Committee on Land, Natural Resources and Environment. Later he was elected by the House Members as a member of the Foreign Affairs Committee. He served there until the prime minister, Ms. Yingluck Shinawatra, dissolved the Parliament on 9 December 2013.

In January 2014, Nitiphumthanat ran for Bangkok Constituency 21 (Sapansoong District and a portion of Pravet District). The results of the 2 February 2014 general election gave him a conclusive win over the other seven candidates from various parties. The Constitutional Court voided the elections for the whole country so he was unable to take his place.

The country's political and economic stability was then disrupted by fighting between the so-called Red Shirts and Yellow Shirts which later developed into ongoing clashes between supporters of the exiled former Prime Minister Taksin Shinawatra and the anti-Taksin group calling themselves the People's Democratic Reform Committee (PDRC).

To avoid this political impasse, on 7 May 2014, Nitiphumthanat was ordained as a monk and spent one month at Wat Bowonniwet Vihara, before traveling to India and Nepal. On 22 May 2014, on his return from India to Thailand, he was informed that there had been a military coup d'état and he was ordered to leave the monkhood and report to the National Council for Peace and Order to be detained. He declined and the army, unwilling to provoke resistance from the temple, allowed him to return to Wat Bowonniwet Vihara on condition that he refrained from public activities and reported to and got permission from the Chief of the National Council if he wanted to leave the country. He has now left the monkhood and returned to civilian life.

After Nitiphumthanat's political career had been cut short on two separate occasions by coups d'état, he became disillusioned by the Thai political process. This has renewed his enthusiasm to spearhead socially and environmentally responsible businesses to bring about meaningful and sustainable change. He has joined with colleagues to form Balance Group Global in order to further this vision for agricultural services development and promotion of the gemstone industry in Thailand.

== Business Activities ==
In the bestselling autobiography "A Boy from Khao Saming" Chapter 6, Page 67 to 85, Nitiphimthanat tells the story of the economic scarcity in his early life which prompted him to dig for Siamese rubies near the Thai-Cambodian border on weekends and school holidays. During this period he started to acquire knowledge of gemstones and their importance to the Thai economy. Later in life, he traveled extensively filming his well-known travel documentaries and searching for gemstones on every continent. He used to be known for having the largest private collection of raw gemstones in the country and in 2003 he was elected to be the vice president of the famous Thai Gem and Jewelry Manufacturers Association and reelected to serve many terms of office. His company Srithepnavaratna used to be based at the Jewelry Trade Center on Silom Road in the Bangkok Business District, but the company ceased trading during a prolonged period of economic recession. With the proliferation of social media, he and his family have now revitalized their business interests and are trading in gemstones and jewelry via the Internet. He is also the founder and chairman of the Guild of Thai Online Gems and Jewellery Manufacturers and Traders (GTOGJMT).

== Family and personal life ==
Nitiphumthanat has been married twice and divorced twice. He has 7 children.

1. Natipoom, 1980, B.A. in international relations, Hawaii Pacific University, M.A. in European Studies, Chulalongkorn University, Bangkok, Thailand. He is a politician and a former spokesperson for Ministry of Natural Resources and Environment.
2. Methavee, 1987, B.A. in communication arts, Bangkok University, M.A. in e-marketing and social media, Middlesex University, London, United Kingdom. She is presently manager of the social media department at an international company in Thailand.
3. Nitinagin, 1988, B.Ec. in international business for emerging markets, Utrecht University of Applied Science (Hogeschool Utrecht), The Netherlands. He is now married to his Chinese wife and is actively involved in international business.
4. Phanwalai, 1990, studying at the Faculty of Law, Assumption University, Bangkok, Thailand. She is a presenter in documentary film company based in Bangkok.
5. Kasamon, 1991, B.A., Beijing Normal University, Beijing, China. After working in Thailand for two years, she was offered a scholarship to study for her master's degree at Southwestern Jiaotung University, Sichuan Sheng, China
6. Jattari, 1993, studying at University of the Thai Chamber of Commerce, Bangkok, Thailand.
7. Nodthaleudee, 1993, studying at University of the Thai Chamber of Commerce, Bangkok, Thailand.

(Jattari and Nodthaleudee are twins)

== Royal decorations and medal ==
์Nitiphumthanat has received the following royal decorations in the Honours System of Thailand:

- 2013 – Knight Grand Cross (First Class) of the Most Exalted Order of the White Elephant
- 2011 – Knight Grand Cross (First Class) of the Most Noble Order of the Crown of Thailand
- 1989 – Freeman Safeguarding Medal, 2nd Class 2nd Cat
