= Phon Paradraksa =

Thai police general (1923–2026)

Phon Paladraksa
- ผ่อน ปลัดรักษา

Personal details
- Born: 25 March 1923 Tha Chana, Surat Thani Province, Siam
- Died: 31 July 2026 (aged 103) Bangkok, Thailand
- Spouse: Udomsri Paladraksa
- Children: Pakpilai Thavisin
- Relatives: Srettha Thavisin (son-in-law)

Military service
- Allegiance: Thailand
- Branch/service: Royal Thai Police
- Rank: Phon Tam Ruad Tho

Phon Paladraksa (Thai: ผ่อน ปลัดรักษา; 25 March 1923 – 31 July 2026) was a Royal Thai Police officer. He was the father of Pakpilai Thavisin, a physician and spouse of former Prime Minister of Thailand Srettha Thavisin.

== Early life and career ==
Phon Paladraksa was born in Tha Chana subdistrict, Tha Chana district, Surat Thani Province, on 25 March 1923. Phon studied elementary at a local school in Tha Chana. He studied grade 10 at the Satun School and grade 12 at the Suratthani School. He attended the Armed Forces Academies Preparatory School and the Chulachomklao Royal Military Academy. He was the first person in his class to graduate. He was awarded a scholarship by the Royal Thai Police to study at the Metropolitan Police Detective Training School in London, England.

Phon began his career in 1943 as an officer and was appointed an inspector at Chakrawat Police Station in Bangkok in 1945.

== Personal life and death ==
While studying, Phon was the classmate of Samoe Damapong, father of Potjaman Na Pombejra, spouse of former Prime Minister of Thailand Thaksin Shinawatra, and her daughter, also a former Prime Minister of Thailand Paetongtarn Shinawatra.

Phon was married to Udomsri Paradlaksa. they had four children, one of the children is Pakpilai Thavisin, spouse of former Prime Minister of Thailand Srettha Thavisin.

Phon turned 100 on 25 March 2023, and died in Bangkok on 31 July 2026, at the age of 103.

== Royal decorations ==
- 1959 – The Chakra Mala Medal
- 1965 – The Safeguard Medal, Pacific War
- 1965 – Fourth Class, King Bhumibol Adulyadej's Royal Cypher Medal (Rama IX)
- 1977 – Knight Grand Cross (First Class) of the Most Noble Order of the Crown of Thailand
- 1980 – Knight Grand Cross (First Class) of the Most Exalted Order of the White Elephant
- 1991 – King Bhumibol Adulyadej's Rajaruchi Medal, Gold
