= Jongkol Kittikachorn =

Thai first lady

Than Phu Ying Jongkol Kittikachorn Knight Grand Cordon of the Most Exalted Order of the White Elephant
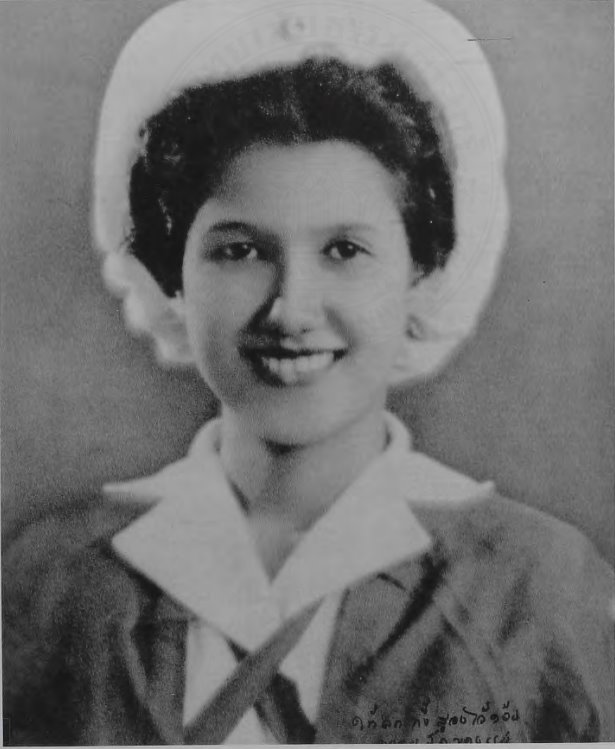

Spouse of the Prime Minister of Thailand
- In office 1 January 1958 – 20 October 1958
- Prime Minister: Thanom Kittikachorn
- Preceded by: Pa-nga Dharmasakti
- Succeeded by: Chawiwan Milintachinda; Nuanjan Thanarat; Pairema Thanarat; Wijitra Thanarat
- In office 9 December 1963 – 14 October 1973
- Prime Minister: Thanom Kittikachorn
- Preceded by: Chawiwan Milintachinda; Nuanjan Thanarat; Pairema Thanarat; Wijitra Thanarat
- Succeeded by: Ponga Thammasak

Personal details
- Born: January 14, 1914 Kingdom of Siam
- Died: July 13, 2012 (aged 98) Bumrungrad International Hospital, Watthana District, Bangkok, Thailand
- Spouse: Field Marshal Thanom Kittikachorn
- Children: 6, including Narong

Than Phu Ying Jongkol Kittikachorn (née Thanathrob; 14 January 1914 – 13 July 2012) was a prominent Thai first lady best known as the wife of Field Marshal Thanom Kittikachorn, the 10th Prime Minister of Thailand. Throughout her life, she was recognized not only for her role as the spouse of a major political figure but also for her contributions to social welfare and charitable work.

== Early life ==
Than Phu Ying Jongkol Kittikachorn was born on 14 January 1914 during the reign of King Vajiravudh (Rama VI). She was the fifth daughter of Colonel Luang Chobkrabuan-yut (Chaem Thanatrob) and Khun Ying Khruawan Chobkrabuan-yut, and she had nine siblings. She was born into a Muslim family and later converted to Buddhism upon her marriage. She received her early education in Bangkok during a period when formal schooling for girls was gradually expanding under national education reforms of the early 20th century. As the daughter of a military officer, she had access to primary and secondary schooling in institutions established during the reigns of King Chulalongkorn and King Vajiravudh, which emphasized literacy, etiquette, domestic sciences, and social duties deemed appropriate for young women of her social class.

Her schooling also included traditional cultural training and social protocol, skills that later supported her public role as the spouse of a senior military leader and Prime Minister.

She married Thanom Kittikachorn in 1930, when he held the rank of Second Lieutenant. The couple had six children:

- Nongnat Penchat (born 1931)
- Colonel Narong Kittikachorn (1933–2024), married Supaporn (Charusathian) Kittikachorn
- Khun Ying Nongnuch Jirapong
- Air Chief Marshal Yutthapong Kittikachorn
- Khun Ying Songsuda Yodmani (born 1944), married Lt. Dr. Suvit Yodmani
- Khun Ying Songsom Kachaseni (born 1946), married Admiral Supha Kachaseni

She also adopted and raised two additional children—the children of her younger sister—treating them as her own:

- Police Major General Nares Khunwattana
- Nara Khunwattana

Than Phu Ying Jongkol was well known for her social contributions, particularly her involvement in the annual sale of poppies to raise funds for veterans and their families. The poppy sale is traditionally held on 3 February each year, designated as Thailand’s Veterans Day.

== Later Life and Death ==
In her later years, Than Phu Ying Jongkol Kittikachorn remained active in charitable and social welfare activities, particularly those connected to veterans’ organizations and public health initiatives. Even after her husband’s withdrawal from political life, she continued to serve as a respected figure within social circles, frequently participating in ceremonial events and philanthropic programs.

As she advanced in age, her public appearances gradually decreased, although she continued to support charitable causes privately. Her dedication to public service and social welfare remained an enduring aspect of her identity.

Than Phu Ying Jongkol passed away on 13 July 2012 at Bumrungrad International Hospital in Bangkok at the age of 98. Her death marked the end of an era closely associated with one of the most influential political families of mid-20th-century Thailand. She was widely remembered for her dignity, charitable work, and her longstanding contributions to veteran support initiatives.

Her funeral rites were conducted in accordance with Thai Buddhist traditions, reflecting her religious conversion earlier in life and her long-standing commitment to Buddhist practice.

== Personality and Public Image ==
Kittikachorn was widely regarded as a composed and dignified figure, reflecting the expectations of women in high-ranking military and political families in mid-20th-century Thailand. Her public image was shaped largely by her role as the spouse of Prime Minister Thanom Kittikachorn, where she was frequently seen accompanying him at official ceremonies, state functions, and charitable events.

Despite maintaining a traditionally reserved demeanor in public, contemporaries often described her as warm, approachable, and deeply committed to social causes, especially those concerning veterans and their families. Her longstanding involvement in charity work, such as the annual poppy fundraising campaign, contributed significantly to her reputation as a dedicated supporter of public welfare initiatives.

Within elite circles, she was also recognized for her refined manners and adherence to traditional Thai cultural values, qualities that reinforced her status as a respected national figure.

== Honours and Decorations ==
Throughout her lifetime, Than Phu Ying Jongkol Kittikachorn received several royal decorations in recognition of her public service, charitable work, and her position as the spouse of Prime Minister Thanom Kittikachorn. Her honours reflect both her personal contributions and her role within a prominent political family.

=== Thai Honours ===
- Order of Chula Chom Klao – Dame Grand Commander (Second Class) (ทจว)
- Order of the White Elephant – Knight Grand Cordon (มปช)
- Order of the Crown of Thailand – Knight Grand Cordon (มวม)

These honours were typically bestowed upon individuals who demonstrated exemplary service to the nation, participated in long-term charitable activities, or held high-ranking public positions. As an active supporter of social welfare initiatives, particularly those for veterans and their families, Than Phu Ying Jongkol’s recognition reflected her sustained contributions to Thai society.
