= Boonruen Choonhavan =

Thai socialite (1920–2021)

Than Phu Ying Boonruen Choonhavan
- บุญเรือน ชุณหะวัณ
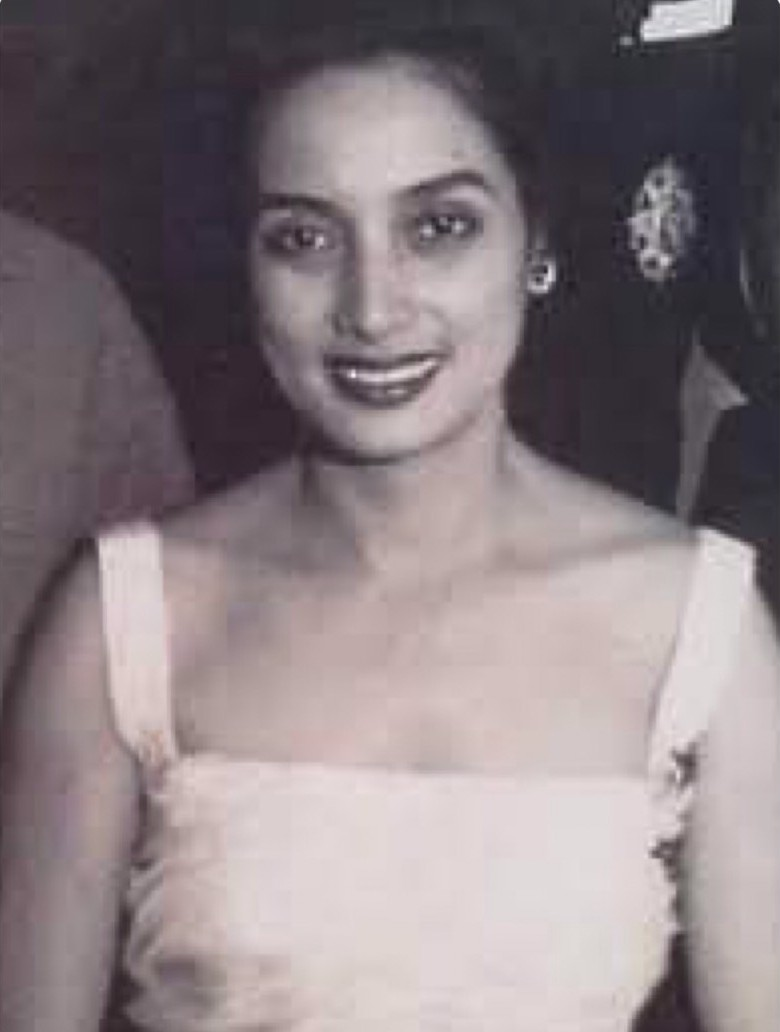

Spouse of the Prime Minister of Thailand
- In office 4 August 1988 – 23 February 1991
- Preceded by: Wirat Chamanan
- Succeeded by: Sotsi Panyarachun

Personal details
- Born: Boonruen Sophot; 25 April 1920 Bangkok, Siam
- Died: 14 August 2021 (aged 101) Bangkok, Thailand
- Spouse: Chatichai Choonhavan
- Children: Wanee Choonhavan; Kraisak Choonhavan
- Occupation: Teacher

Than Phu Ying Boonruen Choonhavan (née Sophot; Thai: บุญเรือน ชุณหะวัณ; RTGS: Bunruean Chunhawan; 25 April 1920 – 14 August 2021) was a Thai socialite who was the wife of Chatichai Choonhavan, Prime Minister of Thailand and a relative of the Queen Mother Srinagarindra.

== Life ==
Boonruen Choonhavan was born on 25 April 1920, in Bangkok, Siam. She is the third child out of four children of Buay Sompot, cousin of Srinagarindra, and his wife, Sam Sompot.

Boonruen and all her siblings were sponsored by Princess Srinagarindra and were followers when the Princess and her families traveled to Lausanne, Switzerland by boat from Penang in April 1933 with Princess Galyani Vadhana, King Ananda Mahidol and Prince Bhumibol Adulyadej. Later, Princess Srinagarindra arranged for her to live with a Swiss family and went on to study at a boarding school for girls. Boonruen graduated in child-rearing and accompanied Princess Srinagarindra back to Thailand in November 1938 and became a teacher at Laor Uthit Demonstration Kindergarten School Suan Dusit Institution. Later, Princess Srinagarindra arranged for him to stay with a Swiss family and continue his studies at a girls' boarding school.

== Personal life ==
Boonruen married General Chatichai Choonhavan, former Prime Minister, who was at that time a platoon commander in the 1st Cavalry Regiment, King's Guard, on 23 November 1944. They had two children together:

1. Wanee Choonhavan (Toi) (born 8 November 1945), married and later divorced Lieutenant Ravee Hongsaprabhas. They have one daughter, Paweena Pahiddhanukorn (née Hongsaprabhas).
2. Kraisak Choonhavan (Tong) (8 October 1947 – 11 June 2020), married Anothai Choonhavan (née Chitrawat). They have two daughters, Tisana and Sirijanya Choonhavan.

== Death ==
Boonruen died in Bangkok of COVID-19 on 14 August 2021, at the age of 101. Her funeral was held in August 15, 2021, held by Vajiralongkorn at Wat Phra Mahathat.

== Honours ==
- Dame Grand Cordon (Special Class) of the Most Exalted Order of the White Elephant (1989)
- Dame Grand Cordon (Special Class) of the Most Noble Order of the Crown of Thailand (1988)
- Dame Grand Commander (Second Class, upper grade) of the Most Illustrious Order of Chula Chom Klao (1990)
- First Class of the Boy Scout Citation Medal (1983)
- King Rama VIII Royal Cypher Medal, 5th Class (1938)

Honorary titles
Preceded by Wirat Chamanan	Spouse of the Prime Minister of Thailand (4 August 1988 – 23 February 1991)	Succeeded by Sotsi Panyarachun
