= Anutin Charnvirakul =

Prime Minister of Thailand since 2025

Anutin Charnvirakul MPCh MVM ThCh RNgBh MP
- อนุทิน ชาญวีรกูล
- Anutin in 2026

32nd Prime Minister of Thailand
- Incumbent
- Assumed office 7 September 2025
- Monarch: Vajiralongkorn
- Deputy: See list: Phipat Ratchakitprakarn Sophon Saram Borwornsak Uwanno Ekniti Nitithanprapas Thammanat Prompao Suchart Chomklin Songsak Thongsri Sihasak Phuangketkeow Suphajee Suthumpun Pakorn Nilprapunt Yodchanan Wongsawat
- Preceded by: Paetongtarn Shinawatra; Phumtham Wechayachai (acting)

Deputy Prime Minister of Thailand
- In office 10 July 2019 – 19 June 2025
- Prime Minister: Prayut Chan-o-cha; Prawit Wongsuwon (acting); Srettha Thavisin; Phumtham Wechayachai (acting); Paetongtarn Shinawatra
Ministerial offices
Minister of Interior
Incumbent
Assumed office 19 September 2025
Prime Minister	Himself
Preceded by	Phumtham Wechayachai
In office 1 September 2023 – 19 June 2025
Prime Minister	Srettha Thavisin; Phumtham Wechayachai (acting); Paetongtarn Shinawatra
Preceded by	Anupong Paochinda
Succeeded by	Phumtham Wechayachai
Minister of Public Health
In office 10 July 2019 – 1 September 2023
Prime Minister	Prayut Chan-o-cha
Preceded by	Piyasakol Sakolsatayadorn
Succeeded by	Cholnan Srikaew
Deputy Minister of Public Health
In office 11 March 2005 – 19 September 2006
Prime Minister	Thaksin Shinawatra
Minister	Suchai Charoenratanakul
Preceded by	Suchai Charoenratanakul
Succeeded by	Morakot Kornkasem
In office 30 June 2004 – 6 October 2004
Prime Minister	Thaksin Shinawatra
Minister	Sudarat Keyuraphan
Preceded by	Sirikorn Maneerin
Succeeded by	Suchai Charoenratanakul
Deputy Minister of Commerce
In office 6 October 2004 – 11 March 2005
Prime Minister	Thaksin Shinawatra
Minister	Watana Muangsook
Preceded by	Pongsak Raktapongpaisan
Succeeded by	Suriya Lapavisutthisin

Leader of the Bhumjaithai Party
- Incumbent
- Assumed office 14 October 2012
- Preceded by: Chavarat Charnvirakul

Member of the House of Representatives
- Incumbent
- Assumed office 24 March 2019
- Constituency: Party-list

Personal details
- Born: 13 September 1966 (age 60) Bangkok, Thailand
- Party: Bhumjaithai (since 2012)
- Other political affiliations: National Development (1992–2000); Thai Rak Thai (2000–2007)
- Spouses: Sanongnuch Wattanawarangkul (m. 1990; div. 2013) Sasithorn Chandrasomboon (m. 2013; div. 2019) Thananon Niramit (m. 2026)
- Children: 2
- Parent: Chavarat Charnvirakul (father)
- Education: Hofstra University (BEng); Thammasat University (MBA)
- Nickname: Noo (หนู)

Chinese name
- Traditional Chinese: 陳錫堯
- Simplified Chinese: 陈锡尧
Transcriptions
Standard Mandarin
- Hanyu Pinyin: Chén Xīyáo
Yue: Cantonese
- Jyutping: can4 sek3 jiu4

Anutin Charnvirakul (Note: Thai: อนุทิน ชาญวีรกูล, RTGS: Anuthin Chanwirakun, pronounced [ʔā.nú.tʰīn tɕʰāːn.wīː.rá.kūːn]) (born 13 September 1966) is a Thai politician and businessman who has served as the 32nd prime minister of Thailand since September 2025. He has also been the leader of the Bhumjaithai Party since 2012 and a member of the House of Representatives since 2019.

Born into a wealthy family in Bangkok, Anutin graduated from Hofstra University and Thammasat University before serving as president of his family's construction firm, Sino-Thai Engineering and Construction (STECON). He began his political career with the Thai Rak Thai Party in 1996 and served as Deputy Minister of Commerce and Deputy Minister of Public Health under Prime Minister Thaksin Shinawatra. Following a five-year political ban, he returned to lead the Bhumjaithai Party, succeeding his father, Chavarat Charnvirakul, in 2012. During the second premiership of Prayut Chan-o-cha, he served as deputy prime minister and minister of public health, where he oversaw Thailand's COVID-19 response and the 2022 decriminalization of cannabis. From 2023 to 2025, he served as the Minister of Interior under the premierships of Srettha Thavisin and Paetongtarn Shinawatra.

Anutin ascended to the premiership following a period of intense political shifting in 2025. In June 2025, amid a border crisis with Cambodia, the Bhumjaithai Party withdrew from the governing coalition. Following the removal of Prime Minister Paetongtarn from office by the Constitutional Court in August, Anutin secured an agreement with the People's Party. He was elected prime minister by the National Assembly, with confidence and supply support from the People's Party, on 5 September 2025, leading a government on the condition of drafting a new constitution. On 7 September, King Vajiralongkorn officially endorsed his appointment. On 12 December 2025, he called a snap general election after dissolving the House of Representatives, positioning himself to lead the country through a transitional electoral period. His party placed first in the 2026 election, winning nearly 200 seats.

== Early life and education ==
Anutin Charnvirakul was born on 13 September 1966 in Bangkok into a Thai-Chinese family of Cantonese descent, with ancestral roots in Guangdong, China. His nickname is "Noo" (Thai: หนู, lit. 'mouse' or lit. 'rat'). He is the eldest son of Chavarat Charnvirakul, who served as acting Prime Minister and Minister of Interior during the premiership of Abhisit Vejjajiva, and Tassanee Charnvirakul, the former director and chairwoman of Sino-Thai Engineering and Construction (STECON). His father is also the founder of the company. Anutin has two siblings: a younger brother, Masthawin Charnvirakul, who serves as a director at Sino-Thai Engineering and Construction, and a younger sister, Anilrat Nitisaroj, who is a director of ST Property and Logistics.

Anutin received his early education at Assumption College in Bangkok before continuing his studies in the United States at Worcester Academy in Worcester, Massachusetts. In 1989, he obtained a Bachelor of Engineering degree from Hofstra University in Hempstead, New York. He later earned a Master of Business Administration degree from the Faculty of Commerce and Accountancy, Thammasat University in 1990.

== Business and engineering career ==
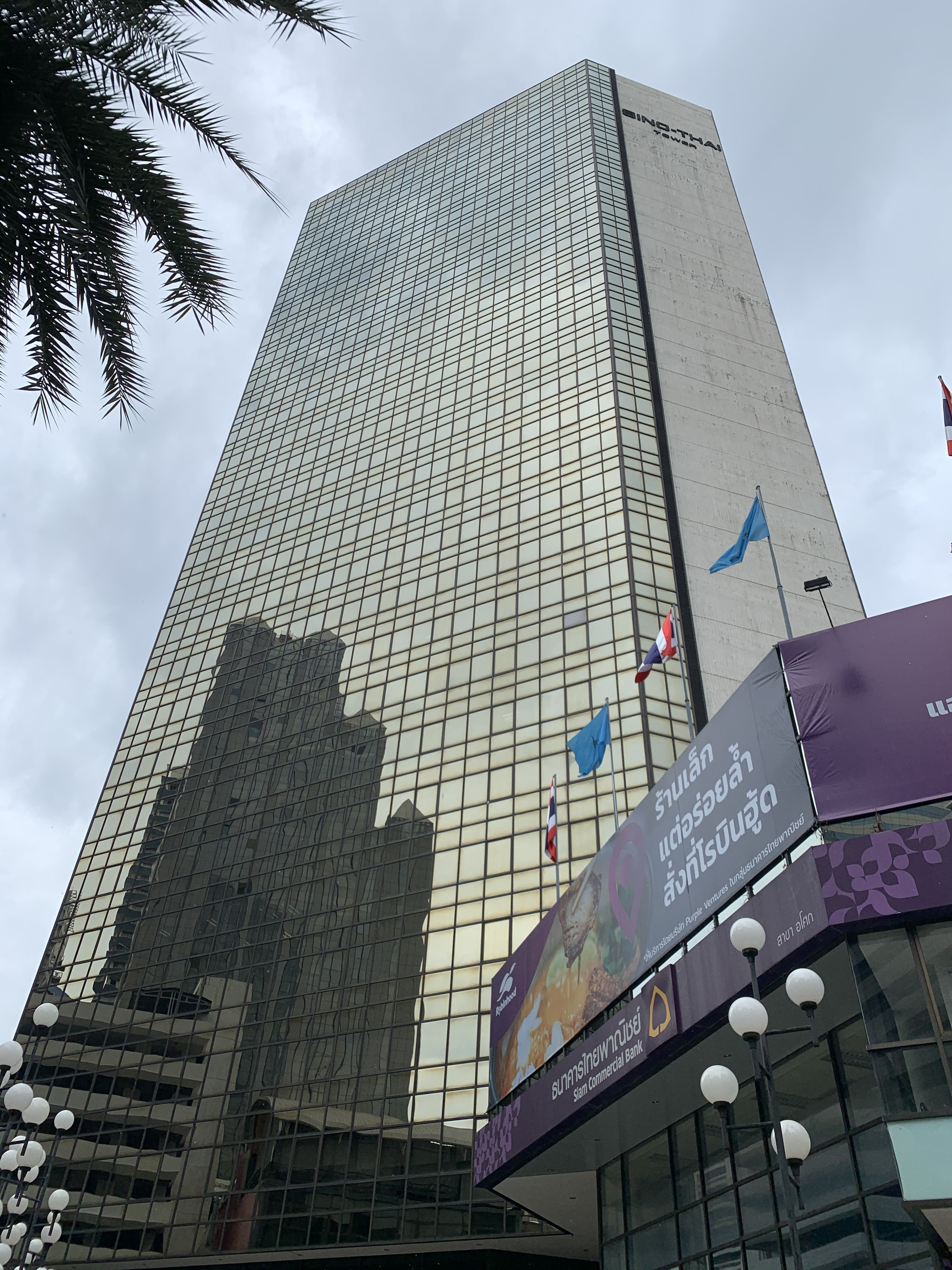
Sino-Thai Tower, the headquarters of Sino-Thai Engineering and Construction, located in Bangkok, Thailand

Anutin began his career as a production engineer at Mitsubishi Corporation in New York City before returning to Thailand, where he rose to an executive position within the family-owned Sino-Thai Engineering and Construction.

Heir to one of Thailand's largest construction fortunes, Anutin inherited close ties to the family-owned company, which has been involved in numerous major national infrastructure projects, most notably the construction of Suvarnabhumi Airport, the main international airport serving the Bangkok Metropolitan Region, which comprises Bangkok, Nonthaburi, Pathum Thani, Samut Prakan, Samut Sakhon, and Nakhon Pathom provinces.

Trained as an engineer, he rose through the company's ranks to become president of Sino-Thai Engineering and Construction, overseeing major projects and operational management, a position he held from 1995 to 2004, before transitioning into full-time politics.

== Political career ==
=== Early political career (1996–2012) ===
In 1996, Anutin entered politics as an adviser to Prachuap Chaiyasan, who was then serving as the Minister of Foreign Affairs. His early political career advanced under subsequent administrations, and he later held cabinet positions as Deputy Minister of Public Health from 2004 to 2005 and Deputy Minister of Commerce in 2004, during the premiership of Thaksin Shinawatra. These roles allowed him to gain experience in both public health management and national trade policy.

Following the dissolution of the Thai Rak Thai Party in 2006, Anutin was among 111 former party executives who were subjected to a five-year political ban by the Constitutional Court. The ban, which lasted until 30 May 2012, prohibited him from holding any political office or participating in political activities.

During this period of political hiatus, Anutin shifted his focus back to the private sector. He resumed work in the family business and became the managing director of Sino-Thai Engineering and Construction by February 2012, overseeing major infrastructure and construction projects. In addition to his engineering career, he also expanded into the hospitality and tourism sector, founding the Rancho Charnvee Country Club near Khao Yai National Park in Pak Chong district, Nakhon Ratchasima province, in 2010.

=== Bhumjaithai Party leadership (2012–present) ===
In 2012, Newin Chidchob, founder of the Bhumjaithai Party, announced his retirement from active politics and publicly endorsed Anutin as his political successor. By this time, Anutin had already become one of the party's most influential figures and principal financiers, playing a crucial role in sustaining the party's operations during a period of political uncertainty. After the expiration of his five-year political ban, Anutin officially joined the Bhumjaithai Party and was unanimously elected as its leader on 14 October 2012.

During the 2013–2014 Thai political crisis, the Bhumjaithai Party maintained a relatively neutral stance, although some members expressed sympathy for the People's Democratic Reform Committee (PDRC), which sought to remove the government of Yingluck Shinawatra. Anutin, who was traveling in China at the time, distanced himself from the protests and expressed disapproval of the party's involvement. The PDRC's main agenda focused on opposing the political influence of former prime minister Thaksin Shinawatra. Notably, Anutin had previously acted as an intermediary in 2012 by arranging a private overseas meeting between Thaksin and General Sonthi Boonyaratglin, the commander-in-chief of the Royal Thai Army, who had led the 2006 coup d'état that ousted Thaksin's government.

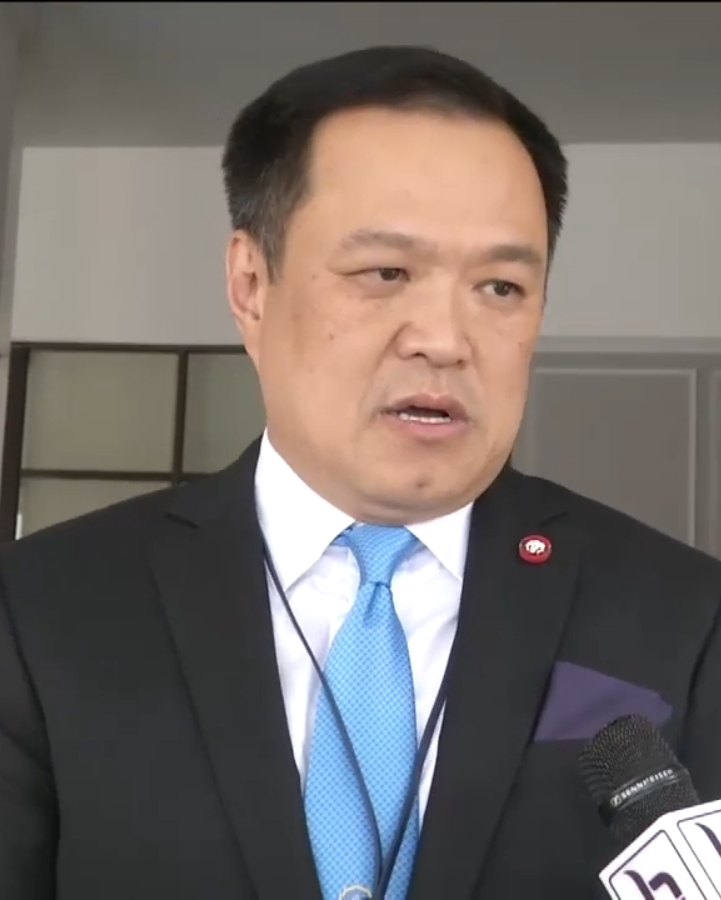
Anutin in 2019

Ahead of the 2019 general election, Anutin was re-elected as Bhumjaithai Party leader in October 2018 and became its official prime ministerial candidate. The party effectively capitalized on the mixed-member proportional representation system introduced under the 2017 constitution, expanding its membership base to approximately three million by late 2018 and positioning itself as a pivotal "kingmaker" in post-election coalition politics.

In the 2019 election, Bhumjaithai won 51 parliamentary seats, solidifying its influence in the Buriram stronghold and becoming the fifth-largest party in the House of Representatives. Following the results, Anutin emphasized his commitment to cooperating with all political parties loyal to the monarchy and supporting policies aimed at national stability. Although the Pheu Thai Party initially excluded Bhumjaithai from its coalition plans, Pheu Thai secretary-general Phumtham Wechayachai later expressed openness to nominating Anutin as a compromise candidate for prime minister.

In the 2023 general election, Anutin once again served as Bhumjaithai's sole prime ministerial candidate. Following the election, which saw the progressive Move Forward Party emerge as the largest faction in the House of Representatives, Anutin reaffirmed his party's conservative stance, declaring that Bhumjaithai would not form a coalition with any party advocating amendments to Section 112 of the Thai Criminal Code, which pertains to lèse-majesté.

=== Prayut government (2019–2023) ===
==== COVID-19 pandemic ====
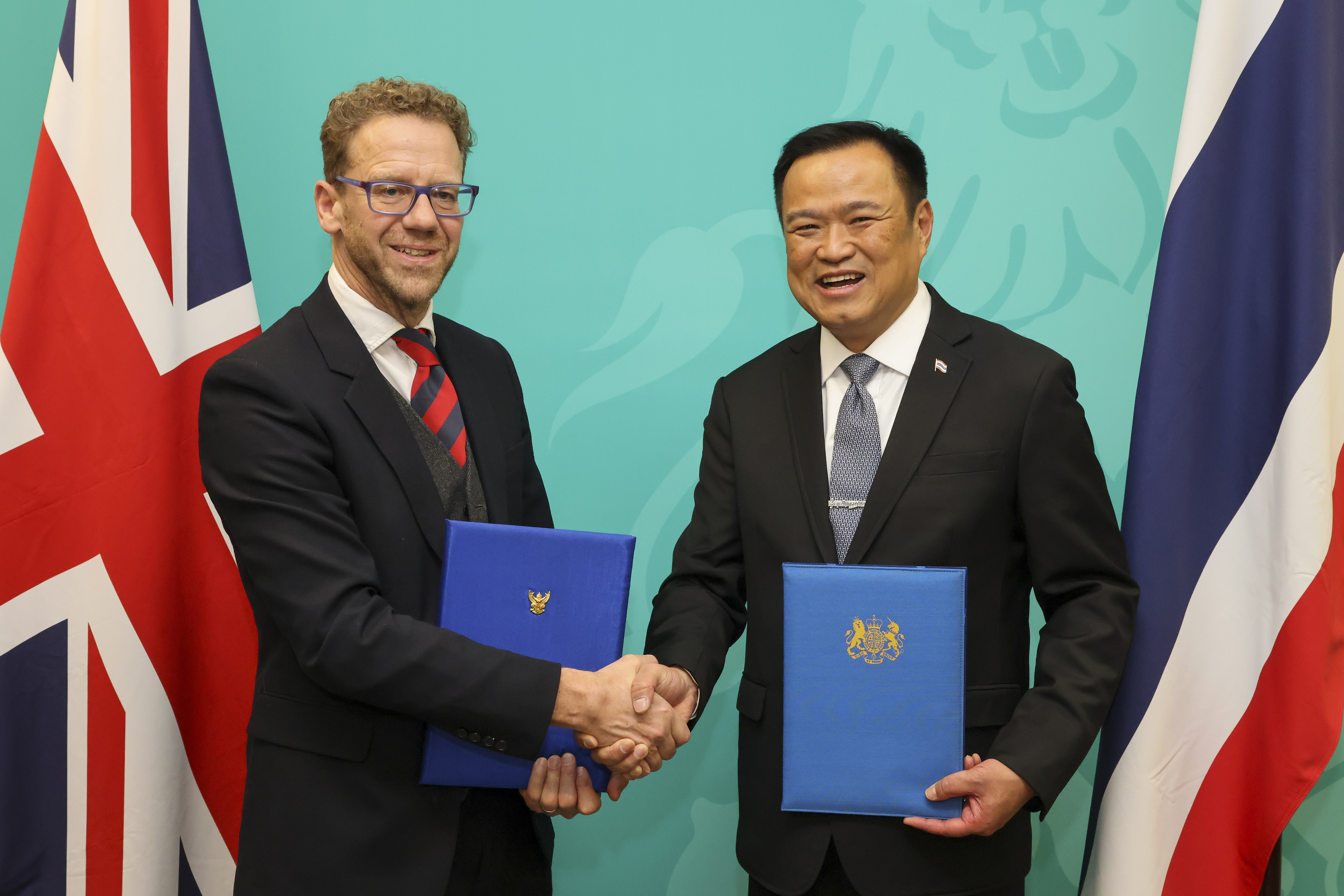
Anutin with British Lord Temporal Nick Markham, 19 January 2023

On 13 January 2020, Thailand reported its first case of COVID-19. The second case was confirmed on 17 January, when Anutin, who became Minister of Public Health in 2019, expressed confidence that Thailand could contain the virus. On the same day, he barred the MS Westerdam from docking in Thailand and prohibited Thai airlines from issuing boarding passes to its passengers. Initially, Anutin downplayed the virus, describing it as a common cold and attributing infections among doctors to insufficient caution. On 29 February, COVID-19 was officially classified as a dangerous communicable disease by the National Committee on Communicable Diseases, which he chaired.

On 19 October 2020, Anutin announced that vaccine rollout would prioritize the elderly and outlined procurement plans from COVAX (40%), AstraZeneca (40%), and other sources, with Siam Bioscience planning local production by mid-2021. The first vaccine shipments arrived on 24 February 2021, and vaccinations began on 28 February, with Anutin among the first recipients. Early rollout targeted hotspots (Bangkok Metropolitan Region and Tak province), tourist provinces, and economically important areas. The program aimed to vaccinate 50 million people by the end of 2021 but faced supply shortages.

In April 2021, Anutin announced that vaccinated residents would receive 'vaccine passports' to facilitate international travel, and quarantine for vaccinated foreign visitors was reduced from 14 to 7 days. Despite Bangkok being a hotspot, residents were allowed to return home for Songkran (Thai New Year), with a caution against large gatherings. Surges in Alpha and Delta cases prompted lockdowns in July 2021, which Anutin described as "worrying," but he later announced no further lockdowns for the Omicron variant.

By 31 October 2022, the global pandemic had improved, leading the government to revoke the pandemic emergency decree on 1 October, downgrade COVID-19 to a communicable disease under surveillance, and halt vaccine procurement as stocks were sufficient.

Anutin faced criticism for his pandemic management. Early on, he made derogatory remarks about foreigners on Twitter, writing in two Twitter posts "farangs," (racist slang term for Caucasians) "never shower and pose health risks to the Thai population" and separately, "Westerners dress dirtily", for which he later apologized. In April 2021, the online campaign MorJaMaiThon (Thai: หมอจะไม่ทน, lit. 'doctors won't bear it anymore') petitioned for his resignation, gathering over 200,000 signatures within two days. On 31 August 2021, a no-confidence motion against Prime Minister Prayut Chan-o-cha, Anutin, and four other ministers over COVID-19 management was submitted by Sompong Amornwiwat of the Pheu Thai Party, supported by the Move Forward Party; all survived the motion on 4 September.

==== Legalization of cannabis ====
As Minister of Public Health, Anutin Charnvirakul actively campaigned for the legalization of cannabis and cannabis cultivation in Thailand. He has been a prominent advocate of medical cannabis and its integration into Thailand's healthcare and economic frameworks.

On 8 May 2022, Anutin announced via Facebook that the government would distribute one million free cannabis plants to households nationwide, beginning on 9 June 2022. This initiative aimed to encourage license-free cultivation of cannabis at the household level. The program was part of a broader strategy to position cannabis as a cash crop and to develop Thailand as a regional hub for medical cannabis cultivation and innovation.

In June 2022, the cannabis flower was officially removed from Thailand's narcotics list, effectively decriminalizing its use and possession. The reform led to the release of approximately 4,200 prisoners and was widely regarded as a historic milestone in Thai drug policy.

Cannabis extracts and cannabis-derived products, including edibles, supplements, and cosmetics containing less than 0.2% THC, were legalized, while products with higher THC concentrations continued to require a medical prescription. The policy also promoted small-scale, community-based cannabis farming to support local economic development.

Cannabis dispensaries began operating as early as April 2022, and their numbers expanded rapidly nationwide. Although cannabis sales were officially limited to medical use, dispensaries generally did not require prescriptions, creating a legal gray area and prompting calls for clearer legislation governing recreational cannabis use.

On 25 June 2025, following the Bhumjaithai Party's withdrawal from the ruling coalition in Paetongtarn Shinawatra's government amid the 2025 Thai political crisis, Public Health Minister Somsak Thepsuthin from the Pheu Thai Party introduced new regulations classifying the cannabis flower as a controlled herb. The rules prohibited advertising and recreational sales, allowing only medical use under prescription from licensed medical doctors, traditional Thai or Chinese medicine practitioners, pharmacists, or dentists. While recreational use technically remained decriminalized, Somsak indicated plans to implement stricter regulations and possibly reclassify cannabis as a narcotic.

=== Paetongtarn government (2024–2025) ===
==== Bhumjaithai withdrawal from the cabinet ====
The Prime Minister's Office notification announcing the resignation of 8 Bhumjaithai Party ministers after the party left the coalition

Amid rumours of a cabinet reshuffle in the Paetongtarn cabinet, Anutin reaffirmed that the Bhumjaithai Party would withdraw from the coalition if he were removed from the position of Minister of Interior. On 18 June 2025, the party announced that it would leave the government, effective 19 June. The party, which holds 69 seats in the House of Representatives, cited a leaked phone call between Prime Minister Paetongtarn Shinawatra and Hun Sen, president of the Senate of Cambodia, as the primary reason for its withdrawal.

Following the party's exit from the coalition, Paradorn Prissananantakul, Second Deputy Speaker of the House of Representatives, along with eight Bhumjaithai ministers, resigned from their government positions.

== Prime Minister of Thailand (2025–present) ==
=== Appointment ===
In the lead-up to the Constitutional Court's ruling on 29 August regarding whether to dismiss Paetongtarn as Prime Minister over ethics violations, Anutin denied having any intention of seeking the premiership. A day before the decision, he met with Prawit Wongsuwon, leader of the Palang Pracharath Party, to discuss the national situation. The court ultimately voted 6–3 to remove Paetongtarn from office.

Because only candidates officially nominated in the 2023 general election were eligible for selection, there were five potential contenders, including Anutin and Prayut.

Anutin and Chaikasem Nitisiri of the Pheu Thai Party were nominated and sought support from the People's Party, which held roughly one-third of the seats. On 3 September, Anutin signed an agreement with the People's Party endorsing his nomination and outlining plans to form a minority coalition government. The deal required him to dissolve parliament within four months.

In response, Acting Prime Minister Phumtham attempted to dissolve parliament with royal approval from King Vajiralongkorn, though legal scholars debated whether an acting premier had such authority. The request was denied, and parliament proceeded to vote on 5 September. Anutin was elected Prime Minister with 311 votes out of 492, abstaining from voting himself. He announced the composition of his cabinet on 6 September, and was formally sworn in the following day after receiving royal endorsement from King Vajiralongkorn.

On 12 December 2025, Anutin dissolved parliament ahead of a no-confidence vote filed by the People's Party, triggering a snap election held on 8 February 2026. The election resulted in the Anutin's Bhumjaithai Party winning the most in the House of Representatives with 194 seats, with double-digit increases in the party's share of the constituency and party-list vote.

=== Criticism over handling of online scam networks ===
On 6 November 2025, People's Party leader Natthaphong Ruengpanyawut criticized Prime Minister Anutin, accusing him of a "failure of national leadership" and a "sluggish response" to the spread of scam networks across the country. In response, Anutin stated that the government was acting "based on intelligence and observed behavior" and insisted that "no one is untouchable." He described the campaign against online crime as a "national agenda item" and a "war we must win," pledging full governmental support, including funding and technological resources, to make Thailand a "safe zone free from scammers."

=== Foreign policy ===
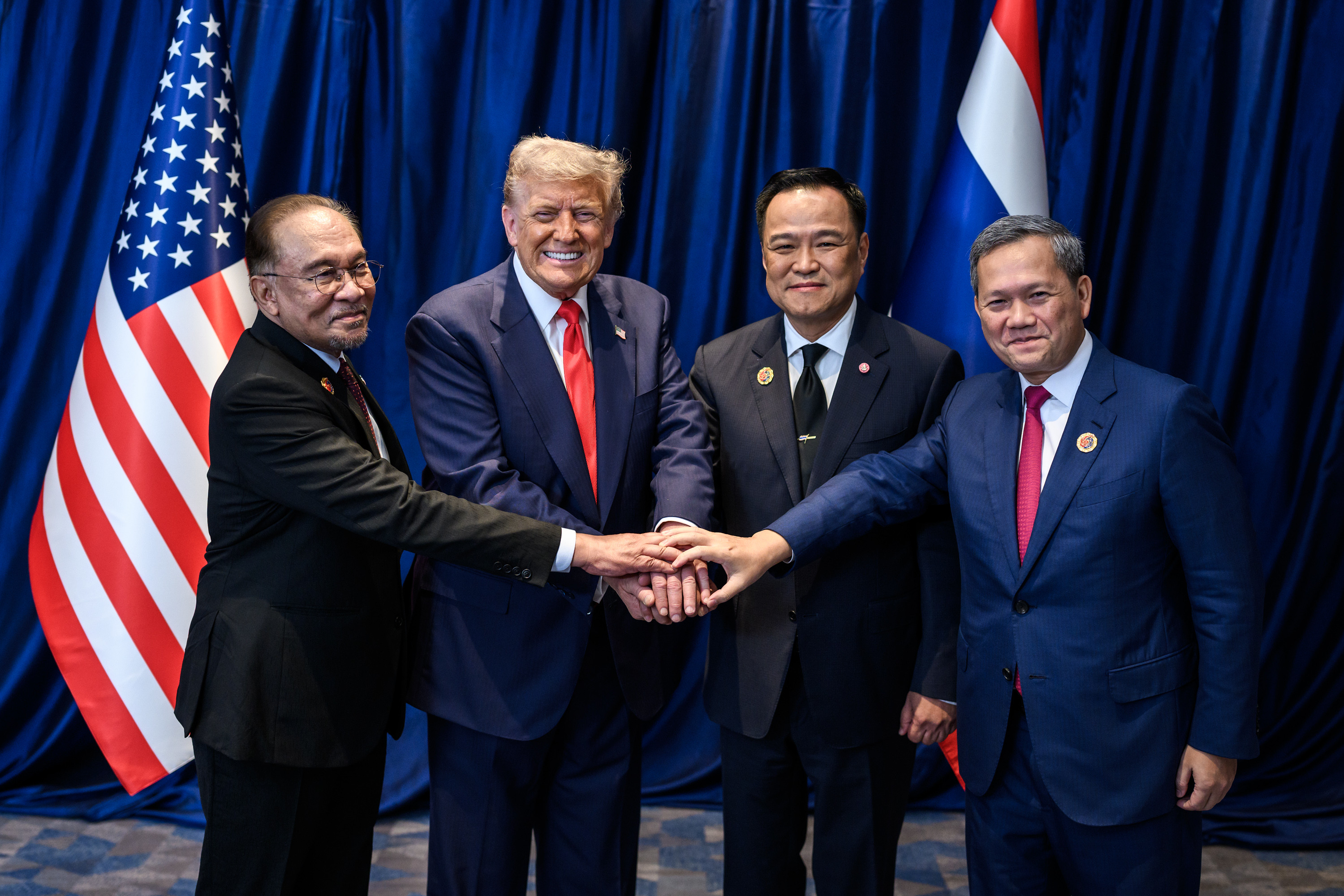
Anwar Ibrahim, Donald Trump, Anutin Charnvirakul and Hun Manet after the signing of the Kuala Lumpur Peace Accord, 26 October 2025

On 26 October 2025, Thailand and Cambodia signed an expanded cease-fire agreement at the Kuala Lumpur Convention Centre in Kuala Lumpur, Malaysia, on the sidelines of the 47th ASEAN Summit. The ceremony was jointly presided over by Anutin and Cambodian prime minister Hun Manet, and witnessed by Malaysian prime minister Anwar Ibrahim and U.S. president Donald Trump. The accord represents a significant milestone in regional diplomacy, establishing new mechanisms for border security, joint monitoring, and conflict prevention along the shared border.

Manet described the signing as a "historic day" for both nations, emphasizing its importance in fostering stability and renewed cooperation after months of heightened tensions. Meanwhile, Anutin characterized the agreement as laying the "building blocks for a lasting peace and mutual prosperity".

The expanded ceasefire forms part of broader efforts to end the Cambodian–Thai border crisis, a conflict that had erupted in early July, resulting in heavy fighting, civilian casualties, and significant displacement along the border. Analysts and observers noted that President Trump's presence at the signing underscored renewed U.S. engagement in Southeast Asian peace initiatives and highlighted U.S. support for ASEAN-led approaches to conflict resolution, signaling an international commitment to long-term stability in the region.

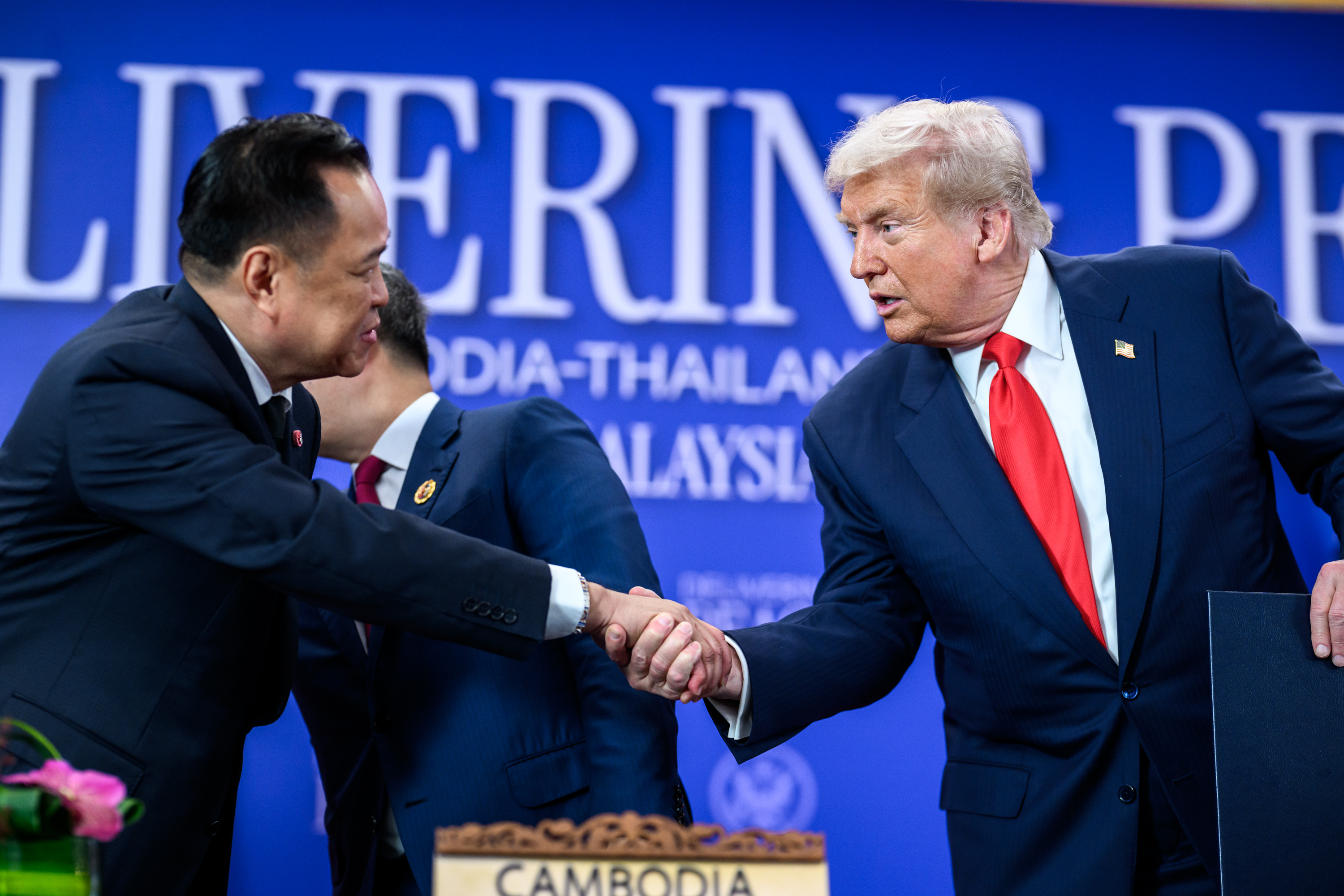
Shaking hands with U.S. president Donald Trump during the 47th ASEAN Summit in Kuala Lumpur, Malaysia, 26 October 2025

On the same day, Thailand and the United States signed a "Framework for a Reciprocal Trade Agreement" in Kuala Lumpur, in a ceremony witnessed by President Trump. The agreement aimed to deepen economic cooperation and enhance bilateral trade flows. Under the framework, Thailand agreed to lower non-tariff barriers and eliminate tariffs on approximately 99 percent of goods imported from the United States. In return, the United States retained a 19 percent tariff on Thai imports, which could be reduced to zero for specific categories of goods listed under Annex III of the accord.

Also on 26 October, Thailand and the United States signed a non-binding memorandum of understanding (MOU) entitled "Cooperation to Diversify Global Critical Minerals Supply Chains and Promote Investments." The MOU, observed by President Trump, committed both nations to explore and potentially develop Thailand's rare-earth and critical-minerals sector. It outlined future partnerships in areas such as mineral exploration, processing, recycling, and technology transfer, reflecting the United States' growing interest in Southeast Asia's strategic mineral resources, especially the Gulf of Thailand.

Anutin stated that both agreements aligned with Thailand's national interests and legal framework, emphasizing that the country would uphold its sovereignty and maintain balanced relations with other global partners. He added that the cooperation marked a "new chapter" in Thailand–United States relations, symbolizing a commitment to mutual growth and sustainable development in the Indo-Pacific region.

On 7 November 2025, Anutin made his first official visit to Singapore, marking the 60th anniversary of diplomatic relations between the two countries. During the visit, an orchid hybrid was named in honor of Anutin and his domestic partner, Thananon Niramit.

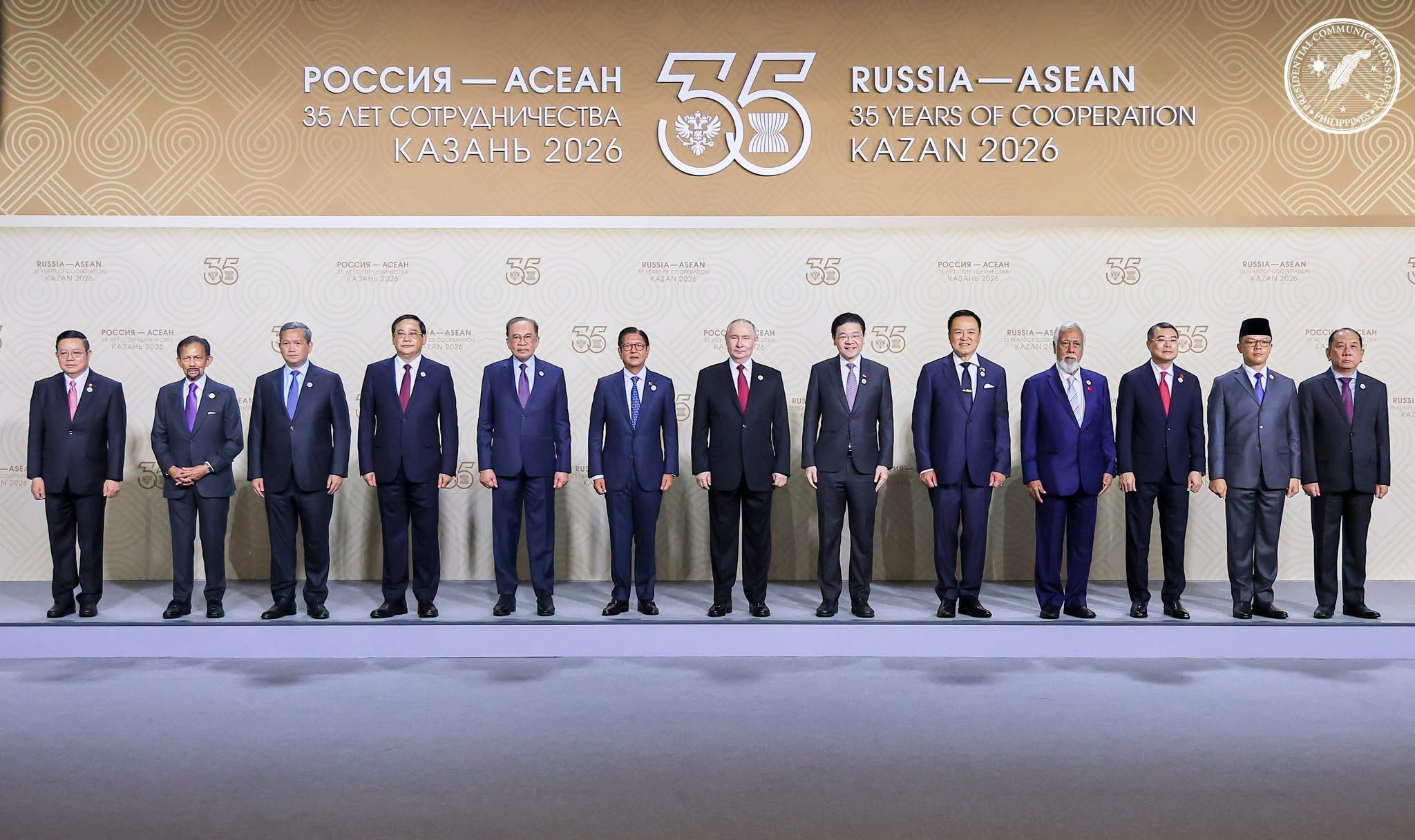
Anutin posing for a family photo alongside other regional leaders at the ASEAN–Russia Commemorative Summit in Kazan, 18 June 2026

Anutin held a bilateral meeting with Singaporean prime minister Lawrence Wong, during which both sides reaffirmed their commitment to regional cooperation. A MOU on carbon credit trading was signed, alongside agreements to collaborate on clean energy transition, with the shared goal of achieving carbon neutrality by 2050, and to advance the Laos–Thailand–Malaysia–Singapore power integration project. Both governments also agreed to conclude a five-year rice trade deal, strengthening Thailand's role as a key food supplier to Singapore. Another MOU on public health cooperation was signed to enhance elderly care development. The two leaders further committed to maintaining close cooperation in defense training and in combating transnational and online crime.

In June 2026, Anutin participated in the ASEAN–Russia Commemorative Summit held at the Kazan Expo International Exhibition Centre in Kazan, Russia. During the summit, he described Thailand as a gateway connecting Russia with Southeast Asian markets. He also expressed support for negotiations on a free trade agreement between Thailand and the Eurasian Economic Union (EAEU).

== Personal life ==
Anutin is a Theravāda Buddhist who enjoys collecting amulets and practices meditation and prayer. He is also known for his passion for gastronomy, once remarking that "dining is always a great pleasure". The Bangkok Post has described his lifestyle as distinctly epicurean. In a 2012 interview, he revealed that he regularly reads seven newspapers daily, focusing especially on restaurant reviews.

During his five-year political ban, Anutin developed a keen interest in aviation. By the end of the ban, he owned four aircraft, including a Cirrus Aircraft, and founded a charter flight company, AC Aviation. He also owns the Khanong Phra private airport in Pak Chong district, Nakhon Ratchasima province. He frequently used his planes for family dining trips to provinces such as Sukhothai, Loei, and Buriram. Additionally, he volunteers for the Thai Red Cross Society in emergency medical operations, including organ transport missions under the "Heart With Wings" program. On 18 October 2022, he completed his 40th mission, flying to Udon Thani province.

Despite his travels, Anutin prefers small, local restaurants in Bangkok and enjoys a wide range of Asian cuisines, often dining alone. His other hobbies include horseback riding at his country club. He also speaks fluent Cantonese, claiming that he speaks it often at home. He is also musically inclined, capable of playing both the piano and saxophone. His occasional music performances at various events has been described as "musical diplomacy" and had performed in Beijing, Hanoi, Kuala Lumpur. On his government celebration of the viral performance of Nene Royal, a 16-year-old girl from Phuket, in America's Got Talent season 21, he performed a duet on "Som San" with the girl.

=== Family ===
Anutin married Sanongnuch Wattanawarangkun in 1990, and they had two children, Naiyaphak and Seranee. They divorced in 2013, after which he married Sasithorn Chandrasomboon, deputy managing director of Rancho Charnvee Resort and Country Club in Pak Chong. The marriage ended in divorce in January 2019.

Three years later, he introduced businesswoman Suphanan Niramit, who later changed her name to Thananon, as his new partner.

== Royal decorations ==
Anutin has received the following royal decorations in the Honours System of Thailand:

- 2024 – Knight Commander of the Most Illustrious Order of Chula Chom Klao
- 2010 – Knight Grand Cordon of the Most Exalted Order of the White Elephant
- 2008 – Knight Grand Cordon of The Most Noble Order of the Crown of Thailand
- 2024 – King Rama X Royal Cypher Medal, Third Class
- 2025 – Freemen Safeguarding Medal, Second Class 1st Cat
- 2003 – Silver Medalist (Seventh Class) of The Most Admirable Order of the Direkgunabhorn

== Notes ==
Political offices
Preceded by Sirikorn Manirin	Deputy Minister of Public Health; 2004	Succeeded by Suchai Charoenratanakul
Preceded by Phongsak Raktaphongphaisan	Deputy Minister of Commerce; 2004–2005 with Suwan Walaisathian (2001–2005)	Succeeded by Suriya lapwisutthisin
Preceded by Suchai Charoenratanakul	Deputy Minister of Public Health; 2005–2006	Vacant Title next held by Morakot Kornkasem
Preceded by Prajin Juntong; Chatchai Sarikulya	Deputy Prime Minister of Thailand; 2019–2025	Succeeded by Pirapan Salirathavibhaga
Preceded by Piyasakol Sakolsatayadorn	Minister of Public Health; 2019–2023	Succeeded by Cholnan Srikaew
Preceded by Anupong Paochinda	Minister of Interior; 2023–2025	Succeeded by Phumtham Wechayachai
Preceded by Phumtham Wechayachai as Acting Prime Minister	Prime Minister of Thailand; 2025–present	Incumbent
Preceded by Phumtham Wechayachai	Minister of Interior; 2025–present	Incumbent
Party political offices
Preceded by Chavarat Charnvirakul	Leader of the Bhumjaithai Party; 2012–present	Incumbent
