= Kraisak Choonhavan =

Thai politician (1947–2020)

- ไกรศักดิ์ ชุณหะวัณ
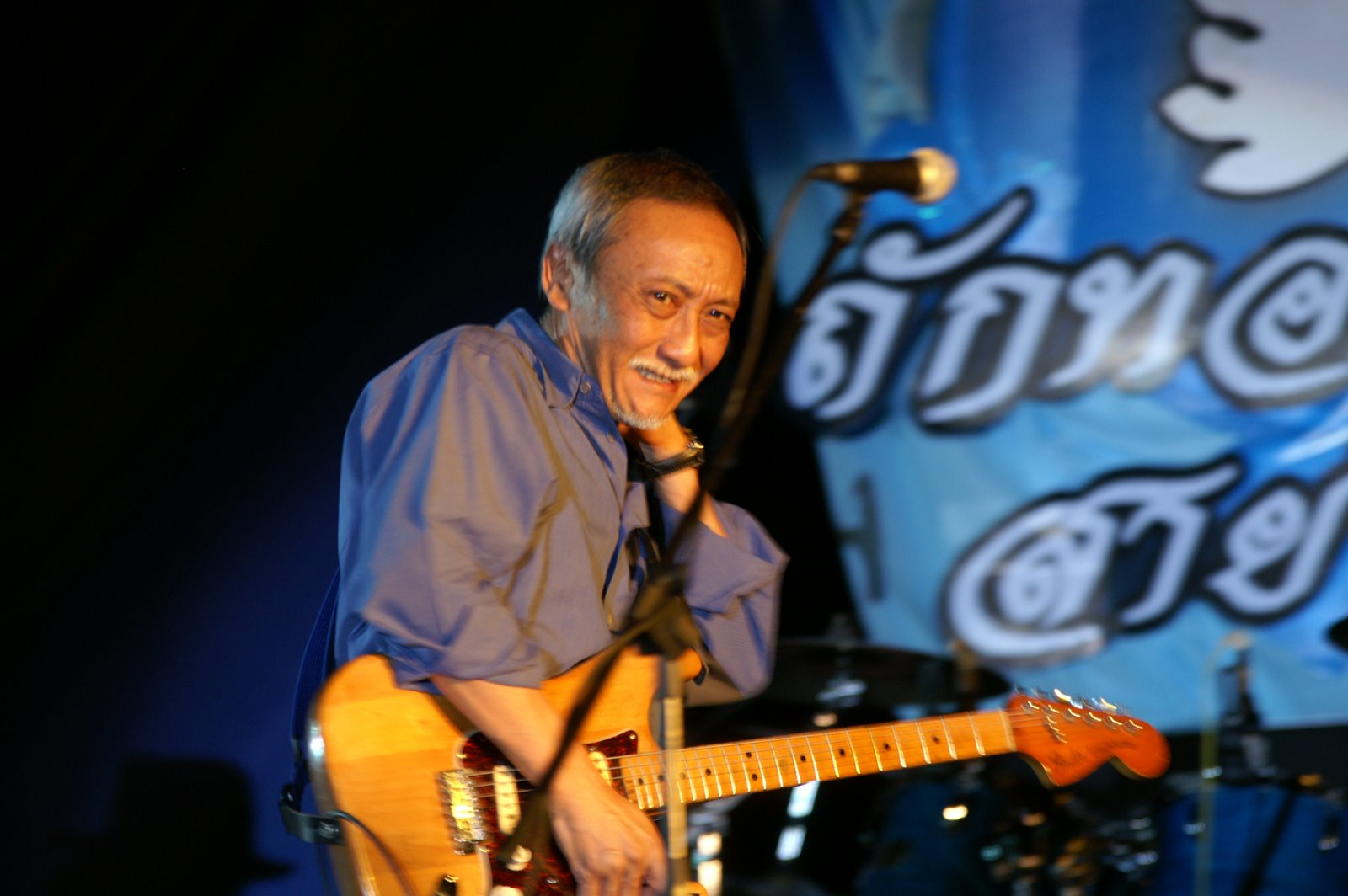
- Kraisak Choonhavan in 2008

Deputy Leader of the Democrat Party
- In office 15 July 2008 – 16 August 2011

Personal details
- Born: 8 August 1947 Bangkok, Thailand
- Died: 11 June 2020 (aged 72) Bangkok, Thailand
- Party: Democrat Party
- Spouse: Tiankhai Choonhavan
- Parents: Chatichai Choonhavan (father); Boonruen Choonhavan (mother)
- Education: George Washington University; SOAS University of London
- Profession: Politician

Kraisak Choonhavan (Thai: ไกรศักดิ์ ชุณหะวัณ, RTGS: Kraisak Chunhawan; 8 October 1947 – 11 June 2020) was a Thai politician. He was a member of the Senate for Nakhon Ratchasima Province from 2000 till 2006.

== Family and education ==
Born the son of former prime minister General Chatichai Choonhavan and Than Phu Ying Boonruen Choonhavan, Kraisak attended Saint Gabriel's College and Wilbraham & Monson Academy in Wilbraham, Massachusetts. He received a bachelor's degree in international relations at the George Washington University, and master's degree at the School of Oriental and African Studies, University of London. He taught political economy at Kasetsart University (1976–1989) and taught the politics of Southeast Asian countries and became an activist for human rights and the environment.

== Political career ==
Kraisak was an adviser to the prime minister (1989–1991) and was in charge of peace negotiations with Cambodia. After the coup in 1991, he was appointed chief adviser to the Governor of Bangkok (until 1995) on urban pollution and arts and culture. He was elected senator in 2001 and became the Chairman of the Foreign Affairs Committee of the Senate prior to the 2006 Thailand coup.

In the senate he was a leading member of a progressive group of 45 senators who opposed human rights violations, corruption, and other abuses under the Thaksin Shinawatra government. He was often interviewed on these issues by international media agencies.

After the coup, local media claimed that the military junta approached him to become the foreign minister of the interim civilian government. However, he denied the junta made such an approach.

It was alleged that the military appointed him as part of the team for public relations work. Kraisak emphatically denied having been approached, much less taken part.

After the general elections in 2007, Kraisak was a member of the parliament (proportional representation) of the opposition party (the Democrat Party) and was elected as deputy leader responsible for the northeast. He held the position of the President of ASEAN Inter-Parliamentary Myanmar Caucus (AIPMC) which is composed of like-minded members of parliaments from ASEAN (Association of Southeast Asian Nations) who work together to restore freedom in Myanmar.

== Death ==
Kraisak was diagnosed with tongue cancer in 2015. He died at Siriraj Piyamaharajkarun Hospital in Bangkok on 11 June 2020.

== Honours ==
- Knight Grand Cordon (Special Class) of the Most Exalted Order of the White Elephant (2004)
- Knight Grand Cordon (Special Class) of the Most Noble Order of the Crown of Thailand (2001)
- Companion (Third Class, lower grade) of the Most Illustrious Order of Chula Chom Klao (1992)
