= List of spouses or partners of prime ministers of Thailand =

Spouse of the prime minister of Thailand of
- คู่สมรสนายกรัฐมนตรีไทย
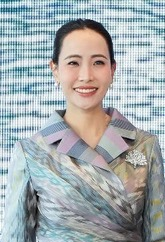
- Incumbent; Thananon Charnvirakul since 7 September 2025
- Residence: Phitsanulok Mansion
- Inaugural holder: Choei Hutasingha
- Formation: 28 June 1932

The spouse of the prime minister of Thailand (Thai: คู่สมรสนายกรัฐมนตรีไทย) is the wife or husband of the prime minister of Thailand.

The spouse of the current prime minister is Thananon Charnvirakul.

== List ==
#	Portrait	Spouse	Maiden name	Tenure began	Tenure ended	Prime minister	Notes
1		Choei Hutasingha เชย หุตะสิงห์	Unknown	28 June 1932	20 June 1933	Manopakorn Nitithada (Kon Hutasingha)	
2		Khunying Phit Phahon Phonphayuhasena คุณหญิงพิจ พหลพลพยุหเสนา	Unknown	21 June 1932	13 December 1938	Phahon Phonphayuhasena (Phot Phahonyothin)	
3		Lt.Col. Thanphuying La-iat Phibunsongkhram พ.ท.ญ. ท่านผู้หญิงละเอียด พิบูลสงคราม	Phankrawi พันธุ์กระวี	16 December 1938	1 August 1944	Plaek Phibunsongkhram	
4		Khunying Lekha Aphaiwong คุณหญิงเลขา อภัยวงศ์	Khunadilok คุณะดิลก	1 August 1944	31 August 1945	Khuang Aphaiwong	
5		Khunying Amphasi Bunyaket คุณหญิงอำภาศรี บุณยเกตุ	Unknown	31 August 1945	17 September 1945	Thawi Bunyaket	
6		Thanphuying Utsana Pramoj na Ayudhya ท่านผู้หญิงอุศนา ปราโมช ณ อยุธยา	Salikhup ศาลิคุปต์	17 September 1945	31 January 1946	Seni Pramoj	
(4)		Khunying Lekha Aphaiwong คุณหญิงเลขา อภัยวงศ์	Khunadilok คุณะดิลก	31 January 1946	24 March 1946	Khuang Aphaiwong	
7		Thanphuying Poonsuk Banomyong ท่านผู้หญิงพูนศุข พนมยงค์	Na Pombejra ณ ป้อมเพชร	24 March 1946	23 August 1946	Pridi Banomyong	
8		Khunying Rabiap Thamrongnawasawat คุณหญิงระเบียบ ธำรงนาวาสวัสดิ์	Sumawong สุมาวงศ์	23 August 1946	8 November 1947	Thawan Thamrongnawasawat	
8		Banchong Thamrongnawasawat บรรจง ธำรงนาวาสวัสดิ์	Sumawong สุมาวงศ์	23 August 1946	8 November 1947	Thawan Thamrongnawasawat	
(4)		Khunying Lekha Aphaiwong คุณหญิงเลขา อภัยวงศ์	Khunadilok คุณะดิลก	10 November 1947	8 April 1948	Khuang Aphaiwong	
(3)		Lt.Col. Thanphuying La-iat Phibunsongkhram พ.ท.ญ. ท่านผู้หญิงละเอียด พิบูลสงคราม	Phankrawi พันธุ์กระวี	8 April 1948	16 September 1957	Plaek Phibunsongkhram	
9		Khunying Siri Sarasin คุณหญิงศิริ สารสิน	Jotikasthira โชติกเสถียร	16 September 1957	26 December 1957	Pote Sarasin	
10		Thanphuying Chongkon Kittikachorn ท่านผู้หญิงจงกล กิตติขจร	Thanat-rop ถนัดรบ	1 January 1958	20 October 1958	Thanom Kittikachorn	
11		Chawiwan Milinthachinda ฉวีวรรณ มิลินทจินดา	—	9 February 1959	8 December 1963	Sarit Thanarat	
11		Nuanchan Thanarat นวลจันทร์ ธนะรัชต์	Unknown	9 February 1959	8 December 1963	Sarit Thanarat	
11		Thanphuying Wichittra Thanarat ท่านผู้หญิงวิจิตรา ธนะรัชต์	Jaladrabya ชลทรัพย์	9 February 1959	8 December 1963	Sarit Thanarat	
(10)		Thanphuying Chongkon Kittikachorn ท่านผู้หญิงจงกล กิตติขจร	Thanat-rop ถนัดรบ	9 December 1963	14 October 1973	Thanom Kittikachorn	
12		Thanphuying Pha-nga Dharmasakti ท่านผู้หญิงพงา ธรรมศักดิ์	Phenchat เพ็ญชาติ	14 October 1973	15 February 1975	Sanya Dharmasakti	
(6)		Thanphuying Utsana Pramoj na Ayudhya ท่านผู้หญิงอุศนา ปราโมช ณ อยุธยา	Salikhup ศาลิคุปต์	15 February 1975	13 March 1975	Seni Pramoj	
13		Mom Rajawongse Phakphring Thongyai หม่อมราชวงศ์พักตร์พริ้ง ทองใหญ่	—	14 March 1975	12 January 1976	Kukrit Pramoj	separated
(6)		Thanphuying Utsana Pramoj na Ayudhya ท่านผู้หญิงอุศนา ปราโมช ณ อยุธยา	Salikhup ศาลิคุปต์	20 April 1976	6 October 1976	Seni Pramoj	
14		Khunying Karen Kraivichien คุณหญิงคาเรน กรัยวิเชียร	Anderson	8 October 1976	19 October 1977	Thanin Kraivichien	
15		Khunying Wirat Chamanan คุณหญิงวิรัตน์ ชมะนันทน์	—	11 November 1977	3 March 1980	Kriangsak Chamanan	
Prime minister was unmarried			3 March 1980	4 August 1988	Prem Tinsulanonda		
16		Thanphuying Boonruen Choonhavan ท่านผู้หญิงบุญเรือน ชุณหะวัณ	Sophot โสพจน์	4 August 1988	23 February 1991	Chatichai Choonhavan	
17		Mom Rajawongse Sotsi Panyarachun หม่อมราชวงศ์สดศรี ปันยารชุน	Chakrabandhu จักรพันธุ์	2 March 1991	23 March 1992	Anand Panyarachun	
18		Khunying Wanni Kraprayoon คุณหญิงวรรณี คราประยูร	Nunphakdi หนุนภักดี	7 April 1992	24 May 1992	Suchinda Kraprayoon	
—		Khunying Amphorn Ruchuphan คุณหญิงอัมพร ฤชุพันธุ์	Seneewongse na Ayutthaya เสนีวงศ์ ณ อยุธยา	24 May 1992	10 June 1992	Meechai Ruchuphan (acting)	Spouse of the Acting Prime Minister
(17)		Mom Rajawongse Sotsi Panyarachun หม่อมราชวงศ์สดศรี ปันยารชุน	Chakrabandhu จักรพันธุ์	10 June 1992	22 September 1992	Anand Panyarachun	
19		Phakdiphon Sucharitakul ภักดิพร สุจริตกุล	—	23 September 1992	19 May 1995	Chuan Leekpai	Common-law wife
20		Khunying Jamsai Silpa-archa คุณหญิงแจ่มใส ศิลปอาชา	Lekhawat เลขวัต	13 July 1995	24 November 1996	Banharn Silpa-archa	
21		Khunying Phankhruea Yongchaiyudh คุณหญิงพันธุ์เครือ ยงใจยุทธ	Limpaphamon ลิมปภมร	25 November 1996	8 November 1997	Chavalit Yongchaiyudh	
(19)		Phakdiphon Sucharitakul ภักดิพร สุจริตกุล	—	9 November 1997	9 February 2001	Chuan Leekpai	Common-law wife
22		Khunying Potjaman Na Pombejra คุณหญิงพจมาน ณ ป้อมเพชร	Damaphong ดามาพงศ์	9 February 2001	19 September 2006	Thaksin Shinawatra	
23		Col. Thanphuying Chitwadi Chulanont พ.อ.ญ. ท่านผู้หญิงจิตรวดี จุลานนท์	Santhatwet สันทัดเวช	1 October 2006	29 January 2008	Surayud Chulanont	
24		Khunying Surat Sundaravej คุณหญิงสุรัตน์ สุนทรเวช	Naknoi นาคน้อย	29 January 2008	9 September 2008	Samak Sundaravej	
25		Yaowapha Wongsawat เยาวภา วงศ์สวัสดิ์	Shinawatra ชินวัตร	18 September 2008	2 December 2008	Somchai Wongsawat	
—		Tassanee Chanweerakul ทัศนีย์ ชาญวีรกูล	Unknown	2 December 2008	17 December 2008	Chavarat Charnvirakul (acting)	Spouse of the Acting Prime Minister
26		Asst. Prof. Dr. Pimpen Vejjajiva, DMD ผศ. ทพญ. ดร.พิมพ์เพ็ญ เวชชาชีวะ	Sakuntabhai ศกุนตาภัย	17 December 2008	5 August 2011	Abhisit Vejjajiva	
27		Anusorn Amornchat อนุสรณ์ อมรฉัตร	—	5 August 2011	7 May 2014	Yingluck Shinawatra	Common-law husband
—		Boonpatcharee Boonsongpaisan บุณย์พัชรี บุญทรงไพศาล	Sukhumal สุขุมาลย์	7 May 2014	22 May 2014	Niwatthamrong Boonsongpaisan (acting)	Spouse of the Acting Prime Minister
28		Assoc. Prof. Naraporn Chan-o-cha รศ.นราพร จันทร์โอชา	Rotchanachan โรจนจันทร์	24 August 2014	22 August 2023	Prayut Chan-o-cha	
29		Dr. Pakpilai Thavisin พญ. พักตร์พิไล ทวีสิน	Paladraksa ปลัดรักษา	22 August 2023	14 August 2024	Srettha Thavisin	
—		Assoc. Prof. Apinaya Wechayachai รศ.อภิญญา เวชยชัย	Unknown	14 August 2024	16 August 2024	Phumtham Wechayachai (acting)	Spouse of the Acting Prime Minister
30		Pitaka Suksawat ปิฎก สุขสวัสดิ์	—	16 August 2024	29 August 2025	Paetongtarn Shinawatra	
—		Surisa Jungrungreangkit สุริสา จึงรุ่งเรืองกิจ	Srilawong ศรีลาวงศ์	1 July 2025	3 July 2025	Suriya Jungrungreangkit (acting)	Spouse of the Acting Prime Minister
—		Assoc. Prof. Apinaya Wechayachai รศ.อภิญญา เวชยชัย	Unknown	3 July 2025	7 September 2025	Phumtham Wechayachai (acting)	Spouse of the Acting Prime Minister
31		Thananon Charnvirakul ธนนนท์ ชาญวีรกูล	Niramit นิรามิษ	7 September 2025	Incumbent	Anutin Charnvirakul	Common-law wife until 13 February 2026

== Gallery ==
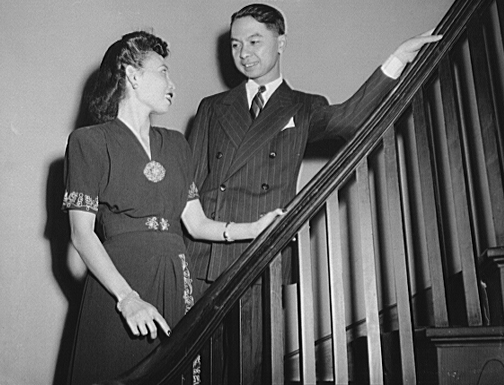
Utsana Pramoj na Ayudhya and her husband.

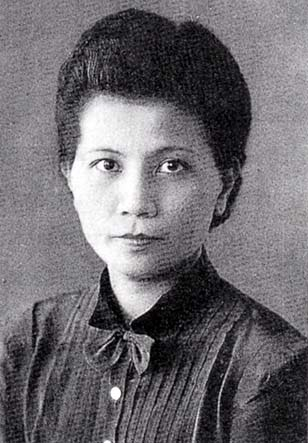
Poonsuk Banomyong.

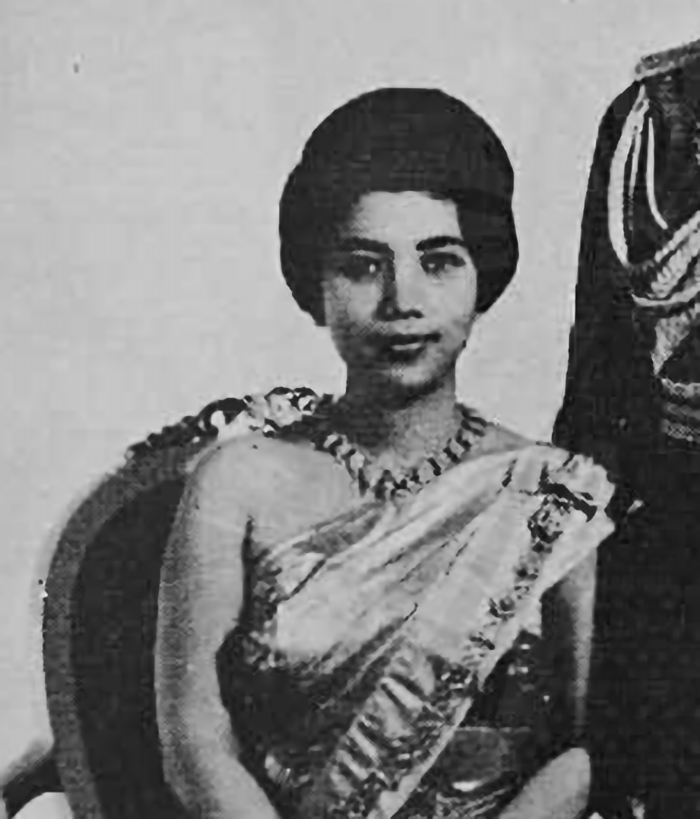
Wichittra Thanarat

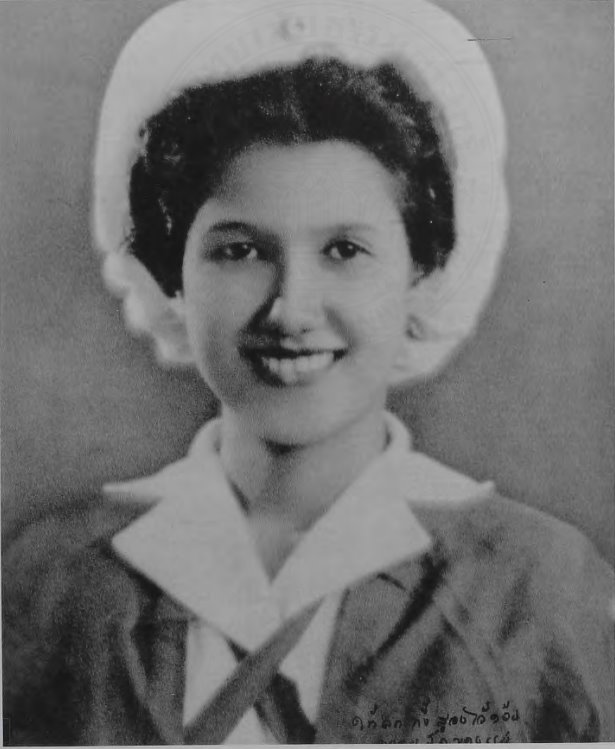
Chongkon Kittikachorn

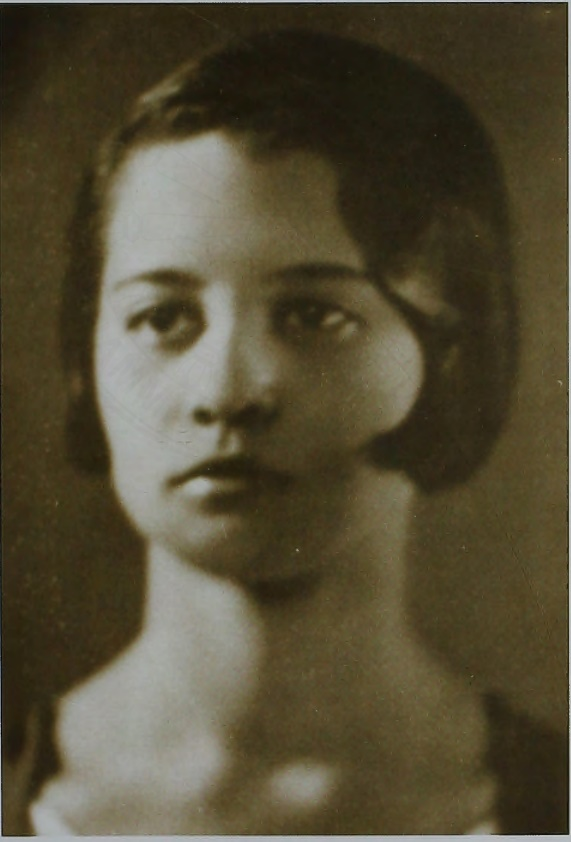
Mom Rajawongse Phakphring Thongyai

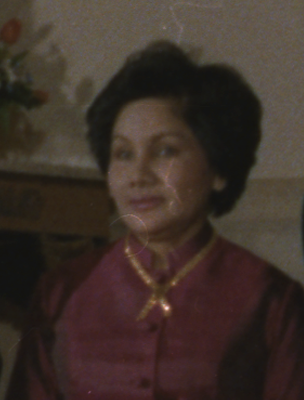
Wirat Chamanan.

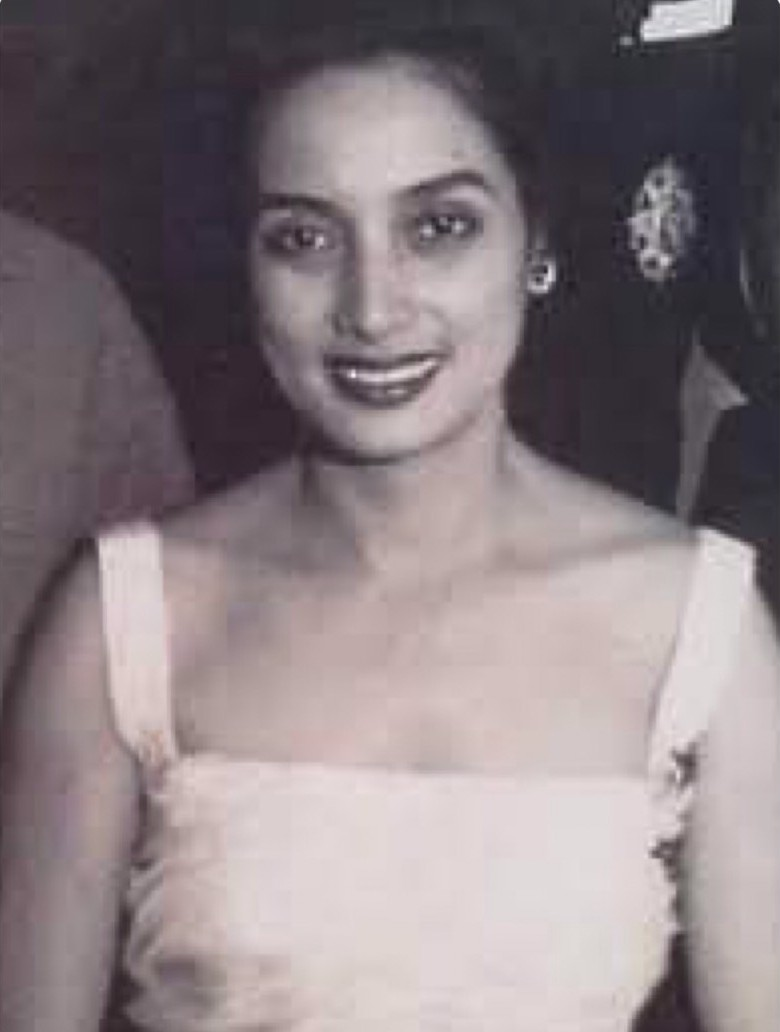
Boonruen Choonhavan

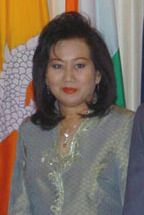
Potjaman Na Pombejra

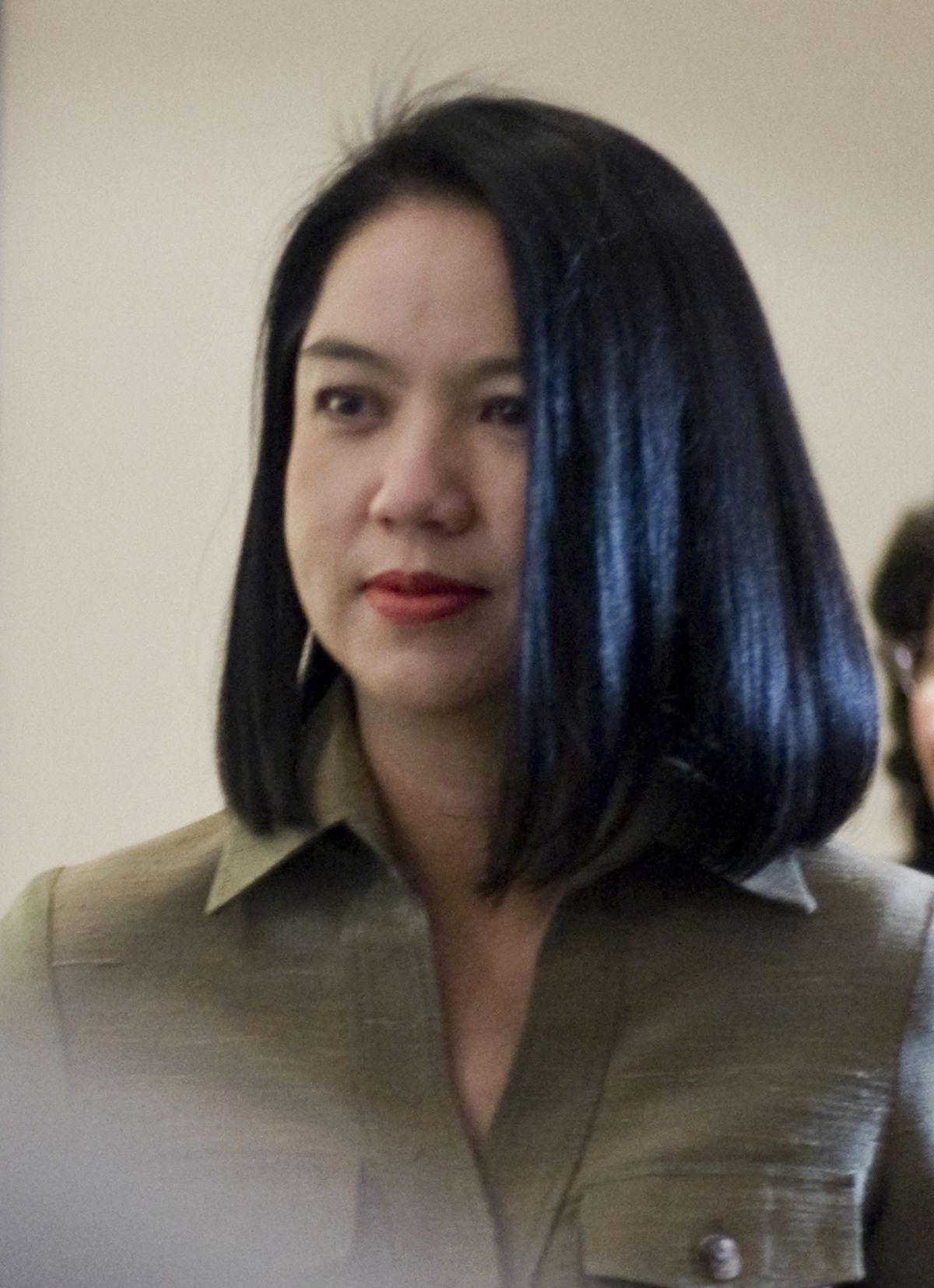
Pimpen Vejjajiva.

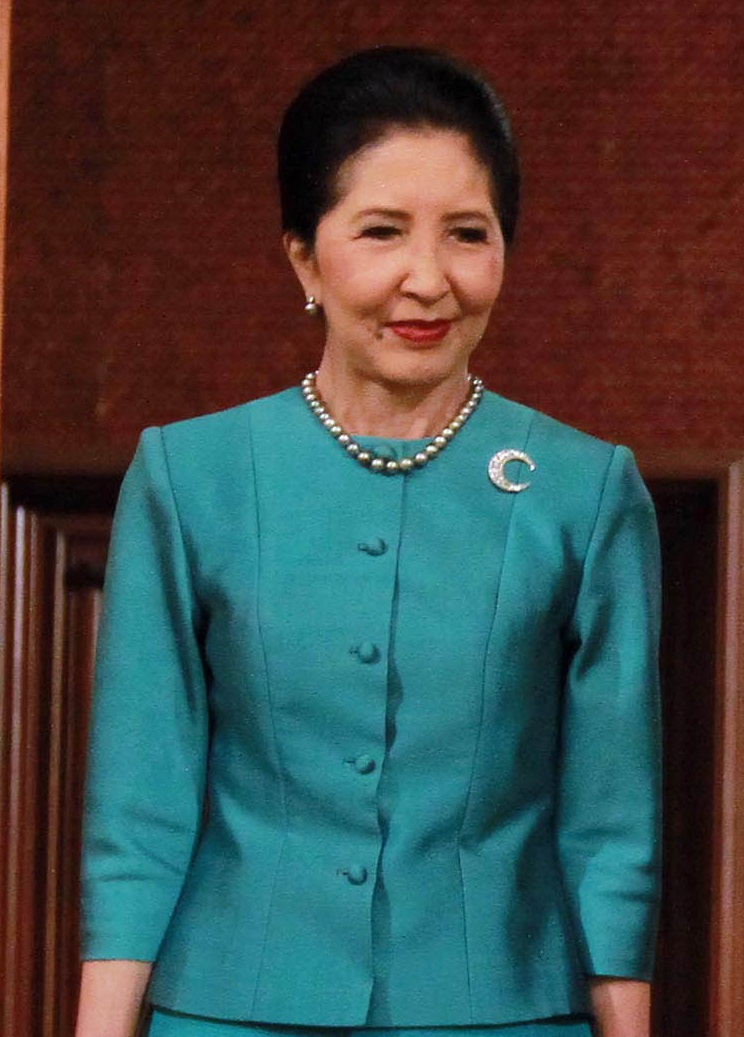
Naraporn Chan-o-cha.

== See also ==
- List of prime ministers of Thailand
