= Poonsuk Banomyong =

Than Phu Ying Poonsuk Banomyong
- พูนศุข พนมยงค์
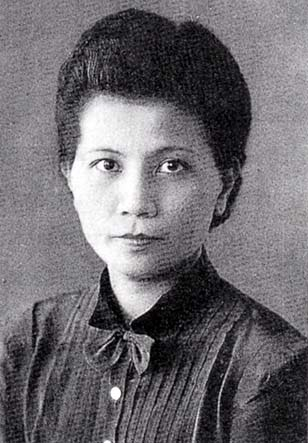
- Born: Poonsuk Na Pombejra; 2 January 1912; Samut Prakan, Siam
- Died: 12 May 2007 (aged 95); Bangkok, Thailand
- Spouse: Pridi Banomyong
- Children: 6
- Parents: Kham Na Pombejra (father); Pheng Suvarnnasorn (mother)
- Relatives: Pan Sukhum (Brother-in-law); Potjaman Na Pombejra (Grandcousin); Pimpen Vejjajiva (Great-grandchild)

Than Phu Ying Poonsuk Banomyong (née Na Pombejra; Thai: พูนศุข พนมยงค์; RTGS: Phunsuk Phanomyong; January 2, 1913 – May 12, 2007) was the wife of former Thai Prime Minister Pridi Banomyong. In November 1952 Poonsuk was arrested on charges of subversion under the government of Plaek Phibunsongkhram and was held in custody until February, 1953. She joined her husband in exile in China, until they were able to move to France.

== Family ==
Poonsuk's great-grandmother, Boonma, was the sister of Pin, who was also the great-grandmother of her husband Pridi. Their parents, Kroen and Kaew, were of indigenous Thai ancestry.

Poonsuk and Pridi had six children: Lalida, Parl, Suda, Sukprida, Dusadee and Wani.

== Death ==
Poonsuk returned to Thailand from Paris in 1986, and died on May 12, 2007.

== Honours ==
- Dame Grand Commander (Second Class, upper grade) of the Most Illustrious Order of Chula Chom Klao (1939)
- Dame Commander (Second Class) of the Most Noble Order of the Crown of Thailand (1958)
- Commander (Third Class) of the Most Exalted Order of the White Elephant (1947)
- King Rama VIII Royal Cypher Medal, 1st Class (1938)
