= Naraporn Chan-o-cha =

Wife of Prayut Chan-o-cha (born 1954)

- นราพร จันทร์โอชา
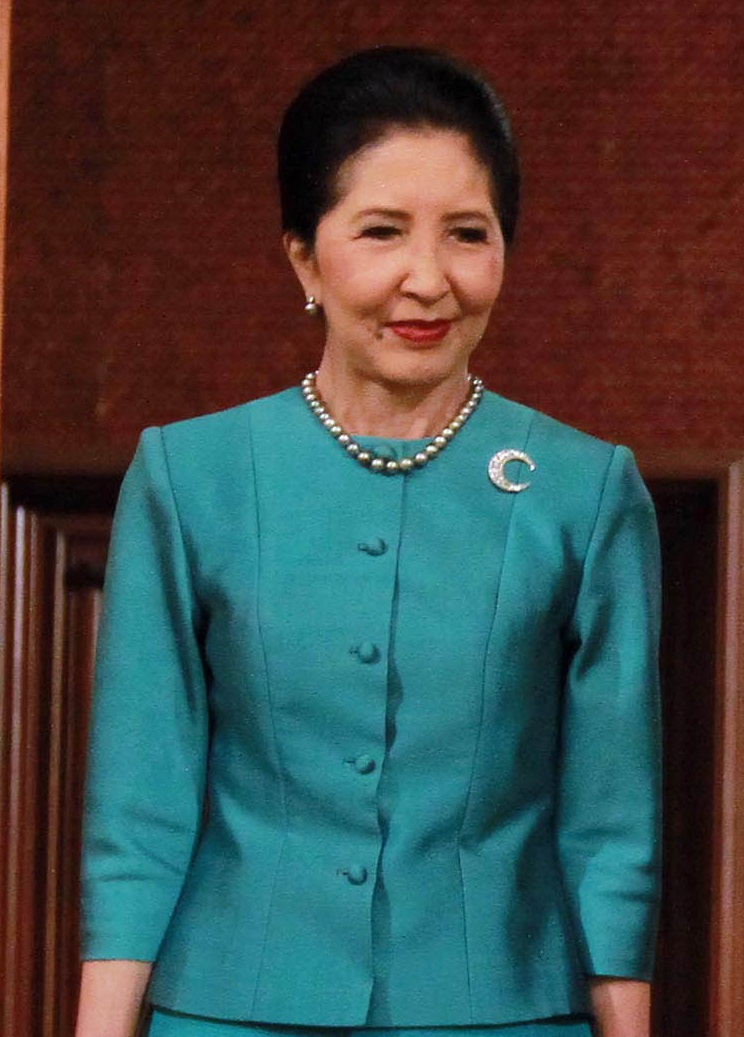
- Naraporn in 2015

Spouse of the Prime Minister of Thailand
- In role 24 August 2014 – 22 August 2023
- Prime Minister: Prayut Chan-o-cha
- Preceded by: Anusorn Amornchat; Boonphatcharee Boonsongpaisan (acting)
- Succeeded by: Pakpilai Thavisin

Personal details
- Born: Naraporn Rotchanachan; 20 June 1954 (age 72) Narathiwat, Thailand
- Spouse: Prayut Chan-o-cha (m. 1984)
- Children: 2
- Education: Thammasat University (BA); Mahidol University (MA)
- Occupation: Educator

Naraporn Chan-o-cha (née Rotchanachan; Thai: นราพร จันทร์โอชา; born 20 June 1954) is a Thai academic and educator. She was an associate professor at the Chulalongkorn Language Institute of Chulalongkorn University. She is married to Prayut Chan-o-cha, the 29th prime minister of Thailand.

== Early life and education ==
Naraporn was born on 20 June 1954. She is the daughter of Police Brigadier General Chamrat Rotchanachan, a policeman and governor from Narathiwat Province and Suthin Rotchanachan. She attended classes at Saint Joseph Convent School. Later on, she graduated with a bachelor's degree from the Faculty of Liberal Arts at Thammasat University and a master's degree in English teaching from the Faculty of Science at Mahidol University.

== Career ==
Until 2010, Naraporn worked as an associate professor at Chulalongkorn University's Language Institute. She became the president of Organization of English Teachers in Thailand and vice chairman of the Distance Learning Foundation, where she took up a guest lecturer position. She also worked for the Foundation for the Blind after leaving Chulalongkorn.

When her husband, Prayut, became the Commander-in-Chief of the Royal Thai Army, she served as the president of the Thai Army Wives Association.

== Personal life ==
Naraporn is married since 22 June 1984 to Prayut Chan-o-cha, whom she met while teaching English at Chulalongkorn University. They have twin daughters named Tanya and Nittha. "My husband is dressed in the English style. I have my husband's shoes made with Church, a famous British brand. But his suits are usually tailored at Broadway," said Naraporn in an interview with the media where she indicated that she was responsible for her husband's clothes, make-up and haircut.

== Honours ==
- Dame Grand Cordon (Special Class) of the Most Exalted Order of the White Elephant (2010)
- Dame Grand Cordon (Special Class) of the Most Noble Order of the Crown of Thailand (2004)
- Chakrabarti Mala Medal (2004)

Honorary titles
Preceded by Anusorn Amornchat	Spouse of the Prime Minister of Thailand; 2014–2023	Succeeded by Pakpilai Thavisin
