= Pakpilai Thavisin =

Wife of Srettha Thavisin (born 1960)

- พักตร์พิไล ทวีสิน
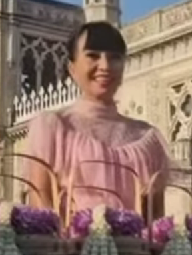
- Pakpilai in 2024

Spouse of the Prime Minister of Thailand
- In role 22 August 2023 – 14 August 2024
- Prime Minister: Srettha Thavisin
- Preceded by: Naraporn Chan-o-cha
- Succeeded by: Apinaya Wechayachai (acting); Pitaka Suksawat

Personal details
- Born: Pakpilai Paladraksa; January 29, 1960 (age 66) Thailand
- Spouse: Srettha Thavisin (m. 1989)
- Children: 3
- Education: Chulalongkorn University (MD)
- Occupation: Physician

Pakpilai Thavisin (née Paladraksa; Thai: พักตร์พิไล ทวีสิน; born 29 January 1960), nicknamed Om (อ้อม), is a Thai physician and businesswoman who specializes in the field of anti-aging medicine. She is married to Srettha Thavisin, the 30th and former prime minister of Thailand.

== Early life ==
Pakpilai was born on 29 January 1960. She is the daughter of Police Lieutenant General Phon Paradraksa (ผ่อน ปลัดรักษา) and his wife Udomsri (อุดมศรี ปลัดรักษา). Her maternal grandfather, Phra Ram-indra (พระรามอินทรา), was a policeman who served as the chief of the Royal Thai Police.

Pakpilai graduated from Srinakharinwirot University Demonstration School, Pathum Wan, and obtained a Bachelor of Medicine degree from the Faculty of Medicine, Chulalongkorn University. Upon completing her university education with second-class honors, Pakpilai pursued skincare studies at the Lions Suphannahong Medical Center from 1986 to 1987. Subsequently, she moved to the United States to undergo training in laser treatments under the guidance of Dr. Leon Goldman, a dermatologist. She then delved into advanced studies in anti-aging medical therapeutics through a post-university education program provided by the World Society of Anti-Aging Medicine from 2004 to 2005, becoming the first Thai to attain this distinction.

== Career ==
Pakpilai was employed at Ratchathewi Clinic and is currently a doctor at the VitalLife Scientific Wellness Center at Bumrungrad Hospital. She is also the founder of S Medical Spa. She is also a former chairwoman of the Thai Aesthetic Dermatology and Surgery Association. In 2022, she was one of the five recipients of Hello! Magazine's honorary awards, bestowed in acknowledgment of her noteworthy contributions to Thailand's beauty and healthcare sector.

After her spouse, Settha Thavisin, became Prime Minister, she became the chairwoman of the Cabinet Spouses Committee. The committee held its first meeting on October 30, 2023, at the Phitsanulok Mansion.

On 15 May 2024, she was listed among the candidates selected for the 28th Advanced Certificate Course in Politics and Governance for Senior Executives by the King Prajadhipok's Institute. The list includes 160 notable figures from politics, business, and government.

== Personal life ==
Pakpilai married Srettha Thavisin in 1989. They have three children, named Napat (ณภัทร), Warat (วรัตม์), and Chananda (ชนัญดา).

In 2013, she gave an interview to deny rumors that she was going to divorce her husband Srettha.

On 28 December 2023, the National Anti-Corruption Commission revealed that she possessed wealth amounting to ฿361 million. This sum encompassed 8 luxury bags valued at 37 million baht, including a two-million-baht Hermès birkin bag, along with Buddha amulets valued at 131 million baht.

== Works ==
- Beautiful in Every Aspect, More Kisses, More Fragrance (pocketbook) - A A Paper and Stationery

== Awards ==
- HELLO! Beauty Awards 2022 – Honorary Awards

Honorary titles
Preceded by Naraporn Chan-o-cha	Spouse of the Prime Minister of Thailand; 2023–2024	Succeeded by Pitaka Suksawat
