= Cholnan Srikaew =

Thai politician and physician (born 1961)

- ชลน่าน ศรีแก้ว
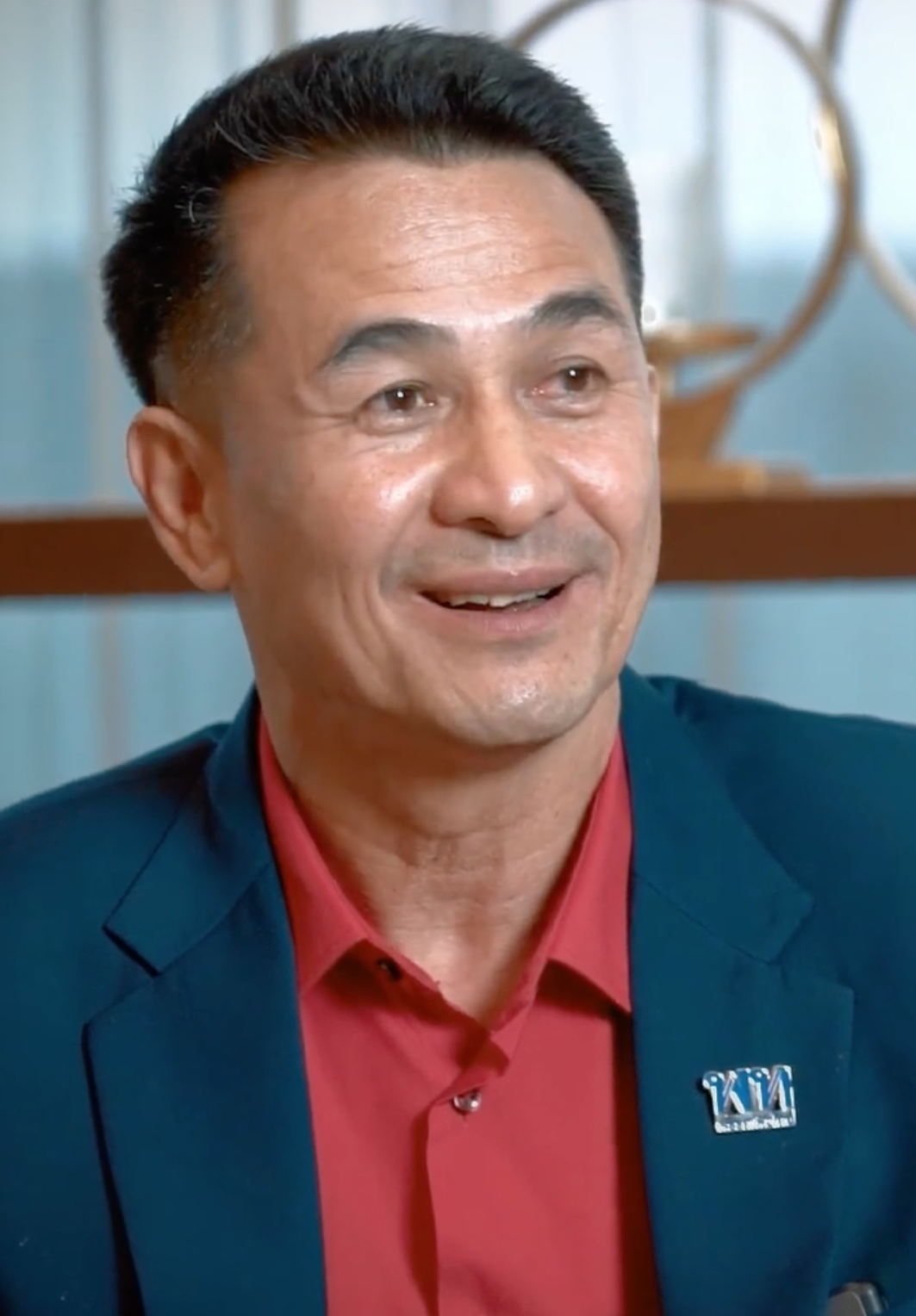
- Cholnan in 2023

Minister of Public Health
- In office 1 September 2023 – 27 April 2024
- Prime Minister: Srettha Thavisin
- Preceded by: Anutin Charnvirakul
- Succeeded by: Somsak Thepsuthin

Deputy Minister of Public Health
- In office 28 October 2012 – 30 June 2013
- Prime Minister: Yingluck Shinawatra
- Minister: Pradit Sinthawanarong

Leader of the Opposition
- In office 23 December 2021 – 20 March 2023
- Monarch: Vajiralongkorn
- Prime Minister: Prayut Chan-o-cha
- Preceded by: Sompong Amornwiwat
- Succeeded by: Chaithawat Tulathon

Leader of the Pheu Thai Party
- In office 28 October 2021 – 30 August 2023
- Preceded by: Sompong Amornwiwat
- Succeeded by: Chusak Sirinil (acting) Paetongtarn Shinawatra (officially)

Member of the House of Representatives for Nan
- In office 6 January 2001 – 12 December 2025
- Constituency: 2nd district (2001, 2005, 2011, 2019, 2023); 1st district (2007)

Personal details
- Born: 4 June 1961 (age 65) Nan, Thailand
- Party: Pheu Thai (2008–present)
- Other political affiliations: Democrat (1983–2000); Thai Rak Thai (2000–2007); People's Power (2007–2008)
- Spouse: Nualsakul Bamrungprom
- Education: Faculty of Medicine Siriraj Hospital, Mahidol University; National Institute of Development Administration

Cholnan Srikaew (Thai: ชลน่าน ศรีแก้ว; RTGS: Chonlanan Sikaeo; born 4 June 1961) is a Thai politician and former physician. He was previously the Opposition Leader in the House of Representatives of Thailand from 23 December 2021 to 20 March 2023. He was the leader of the Pheu Thai Party from 28 October 2021 to 30 August 2023.

== Early life ==
Cholnan was born on 4 June 1961, at Lai Nan Subdistrict, Wiang Sa District, Nan Province. He graduated with a bachelor's degree in medicine from the Faculty of Medicine Siriraj Hospital Mahidol University in 1986 and a master's degree in Public Administration from the National Institute of Development Administration in 1999.

Cholnan was a physician at Wiang Sa Hospital, Wiang Sa District, Nan Province, and used to be the Director of Somdej Phra Yuparat Pua Hospital, Pua District, Nan Province between 1995 and 2000.

== Political career ==
Cholnan was elected a member of the House of Representatives for the first time in 2001 under the Thai Rak Thai Party and currently serves as a member of the House of Representatives for the Nan Province under the Pheu Thai Party. In 2004, he was appointed as the Secretary to Deputy Minister of Public Health and in 2005 as the Secretary to Professor Suchai Charoenratanakul, the Minister of Public Health under the Thaksin Shinawatra premiership.

Under Yingluck Shinawatra's government, Srikaew was appointed Deputy Minister of Public Health on 27 October 2012, until June 2013.

On 28 October 2021, he was elected leader of the Pheu Thai Party and on 23 December 2021, was appointed as Leader of the Opposition in the House of Representatives.

On 1 September 2023 he became Minister of Public Health under Prime Minister Srettha Thavisin, also from the Pheu Thai Party.

== Royal decorations ==
- 2008 - Knight Grand Cordon (Special Class) of the Most Exalted Order of the White Elephant
- 2005 - Knight Grand Cordon (Special Class) of the Most Noble Order of the Crown of Thailand
- 2002 - Bitaksa Seri Chon - Freemen Safeguarding Medal (Second Class, Second Category)

Political offices
| Preceded by Surawit Khonsomboon | Deputy Minister of Public Health; 2012–2013 | Succeeded by Sorawong Thienthong |
| Preceded by Sompong Amornwiwat | Leader of the Opposition; 2021–2023 | Vacant |
Assembly seats
| New district | Members of the House of Representatives for Nan, 2nd District; 2001–2006 | District eliminated |
| Vacant Title last held by Sirinthon Rammasut | Members of the House of Representatives for Nan, 1st District; 2007–2011 with Sirinthon Rammasut; Wanlop Supriyasil | Succeeded by Sirinthon Rammasut |
| New district | Members of the House of Representatives for Nan, 2nd District; 2011–2013 | Vacant Title next held by Himself |
| Vacant Title last held by Himself | Members of the House of Representatives for Nan, 2nd District; 2019–present | Incumbent |
Party political offices
| Preceded by Sompong Amornwiwat | Leader of Pheu Thai Party; 2021–2023 | Succeeded by Paethongtarn Shinawatra |
