= Thananon Charnvirakul =

Thai businesswoman (born 1984)

- ธนนนท์ ชาญวีรกูล
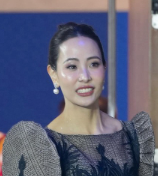
- Thananon Niramit in 2026

Spouse of the Prime Minister of Thailand (Note: As Partner of the Prime Minister of Thailand until 13 February 2026.)
- Assumed role 7 September 2025
- Prime Minister: Anutin Charnvirakul
- Preceded by: Surisa Jungrungreangkit (acting); Pitaka Suksawat

Personal details
- Born: Jittrawadee Niramit; January 13, 1984 (age 42) Ranong, Thailand
- Party: Bhumjaithai (2022–present)
- Spouse: Anutin Charnvirakul (m. 2026)
- Education: Thammasat University (BA); National Defence College
- Occupation: Businesswoman

Thananon Charnvirakul (née Niramit ; Thai: ธนนนท์ ชาญวีรกูล; born 13 January 1984) is a Thai businesswoman. She is the spouse of Anutin Charnvirakul, the 32nd prime minister of Thailand. She is an honorary advisor to the Interior Ministry Housewives Association.

== Early life and education ==
Thananon Charnvirakul was born on 13 January 1984 in Bang Rin Subdistrict, Mueang Ranong District, Ranong Province, Thailand to a Thai Chinese family. She is the youngest daughter of Kitti Niramit and Jintana Niramit, who operate an automobile parts trading business in Ranong. She grew up in a business family and has three elder sisters. Originally named Jittrawadee, she later changed her given name several times—to Natamon and Suphanan before adopting her current name, Thananon.

She completed her secondary education at Triam Udom Suksa School and earned a bachelor’s degree in liberal arts from Thammasat University. During her university years, she served as a drum major in the annual Chula–Thammasat Traditional Football Match, one of Thailand's most prominent student events. Later, she completed the Executive Program in National Security (Mini-Wor Por Or), Class 1, offered by the National Defence College of Thailand, a course designed for future leaders. Among her classmates were Paetongtarn Shinawatra, the 31st Prime Minister of Thailand, and Chaichana Detdecho, former Deputy Minister of Public Health.

== Career ==
Thananon is the owner of JaJaa Coffee, a café located in Bang Rin Subdistrict, Mueang Ranong District, Ranong Province which was one of the first air-conditioned fresh coffee shops in the province. It became a well-known local hub for over 17 years. She became affiliated with the Bhumjaithai Party and formally joined the party in 2022. In her business ventures, she actively supports her hometown by sourcing local ingredients from Ranong, such as "Kyu Kyu" (cashew nuts), to promote local farmers and products.

Her public visibility increased significantly in 2022, when Anutin Charnvirakul formally introduced her to the public. The couple appeared together at a royal blessing ceremony for King Vajiralongkorn on 4 May 2022, held at the Santi Maitri Building, Government House, to mark Coronation Day. She is an honorary advisor to the Interior Ministry Housewives Association.

She launched another café and dessert shop named Jarisstar, located within the premises of the Bhumjaithai Party headquarters on Phahonyothin Road, Chatuchak District, Bangkok.

== As de facto First Lady ==
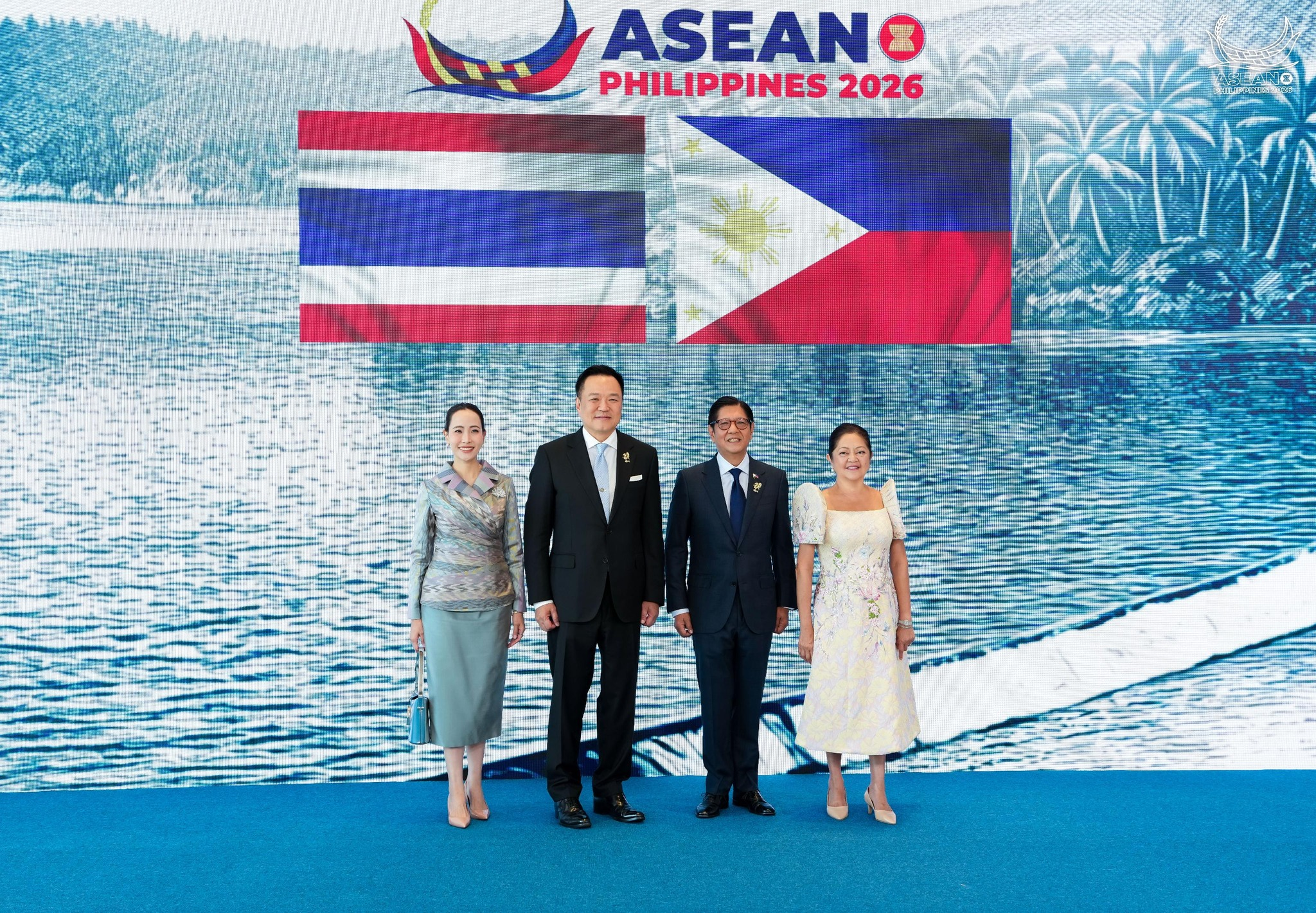
Thananon (left) and her husband with Philippine president Bongbong Marcos and first lady Liza Araneta Marcos at the 48th ASEAN Summit in Cebu in May 2026

Following Anutin Charnvirakul's rise to the position of Prime Minister in 2025, Thananon became Thailand's de facto First Lady, accompanying him to official events and public ceremonies.

In 2025, her declared assets were valued at 56 million baht, according to the National Anti-Corruption Commission disclosure.

On 16 October 2025, Thananon Niramit accompanied Prime Minister Anutin Charnvirakul on his first official overseas visit since taking office, to Vientiane, Laos, to mark the 75th anniversary of Thai–Lao diplomatic relations.

Later that month she participated in the "Spouses' Programme" at the 47th ASEAN Summit in Kuala Lumpur as the spouse of the Prime Minister of Thailand.

On 30 October 2025, Thananon Niramit faced public criticism after she remarked "So mean" to reporters at Don Mueang Airport upon returning from Malaysia. The comment was criticized by opposition figures, who said it could be viewed as an attempt to pressure the press. She later issued an apology, stating that her choice of words was inappropriate.

During an official visit to Singapore with her husband, the couple was honored with a new orchid hybrid named Vanchoanthe Anutin Thananon Charnvirakul in recognition of their visit.

== Notes ==
Honorary titles
Preceded by Pitaka Suksawat	Spouse of the Prime Minister of Thailand; 2025–present	Incumbent
