= 2006 Thai political party dissolution charges =

Party dissolution charges were a series of events and scandals that eventually led to the dissolution of the Thai Rak Thai Party, Thailand's biggest political party, and a few small parties following a general election in April, 2006.

== Background ==
Since his ascension to power by an unprecedented landslide victory in 2001, then Prime Minister of Thailand Thaksin Shinawatra triggered public concerns over his authoritarian-style leadership, corruption scandals, massive wealth added to the already wealthy Thaksin and his cabinet members, and abuses of power by Thaksin himself. These concerns were growing in spite of huge popularity among business communities and rural voters who were enjoying wealth resulting from Thaksin's populist policy.

These concerns were stoked by the sales of Shin Corp, whose largest portion of shares were owned by Thaksin's family. The deal raised concern over Thaksin's conflicting interests, triggering public outrages and resulting in months of mass protests. The protests gained increased momentum, particularly among the urban middle- and upper-classes and later accelerated by the strict censorship of media, both by the media's own censorship and intervention by the authority. Although mass protests in Bangkok were intense, support for Thai Rak Thai was still strong in the rural areas. Criticized by the opposition parties of avoiding testimony before the joint session of parliament, Thaksin weighed the situations and decided to dissolve the House of Representatives in February and called for a general election in April 2006, hoping that the election would legitimize his position. The decision followed Thaksin's insistence that he would not resign and would not dissolve the House. Thaksin defended his decision, saying that he wanted to return the power back to the seriously divisive Thai people following massive protests against his administration.

== General Election in April 2006 ==
The opposition parties decided to boycott the elections, citing that no conflict occurred between the government and the House (the TRT controlled 377 out of 500 votes in the House); that Thaksin wanted to avoid testimony before the joint session for a completely personal reason; and that Thaksin did not live up to his pledge to undertake political reform.

== Verdict delivered by the Constitutional Tribunal ==
The final verdict was broadcast live on national television on May 30, 2007 by the Constitutional Tribunal appointed by the Council for National Security.

=== Verdict on Group 1 (Thai Rak Thai Party, Pattana Chart Thai Party, and Pandin Thai Party) ===
The Thai Rak Thai Party, Pattana Chart Thai Party, and Pandin Thai Party were unanimously found guilty of conspiring to gain administrative power by illegal means. And consequently, all three parties were dissolved. The verdict found General Thammarak Issarangkura na Ayudhya and Pongsak Raktapongpaisarn, both key executive members of the Thai Rak Thai Party, guilty of providing funds for both the Pattana Chart Thai and Pandin Thai Parties. Boontaweesak Amorasil, leader of the Pattana Chart Thai Party, was found guilty of receiving money from General Thammarak and illegally amending its party membership records. Bunyabaramipon Chinarat, leader of the Pandin Thai Party, and Mrs. Thattima Pawali were found guilty of receiving money from General Thammarak and issuing fraudulent letter of certification for Party members.

The Constitutional Judges also barred 111 executive members of the Thai Rak Thai Party, including former Prime Minister Thaksin Shinawatra, 19 executive members of the Pattana Chart Thai Party, and 3 executive members of the Pandin Thai Party from participating in politics for a five-year period.

==== Summary Verdict ====
After thorough consideration of the petition, rebuttal statements from the Thai Rak Thai Party, Pattana Chart Thai Party, and Pandin Thai Party, and all of the evidence of the Parties concerned, the Constitutional Tribunal found, on the factual and legal basis, the following:

1. The Constitutional Tribunal has jurisdiction over the case.
2. The filing of the petition, through the Attorney-General, to dissolve the Party is the authorized power given to the Registrar of the political parties, when a matter appears - notwithstanding wherever the source is.
3. The investigation of factual issues and determination of issues or arguments are within the powers of the Registrar of the political parties in accordance with the Organic Act on Political Parties of B.E. 2541. And even though the Registrar of the political parties is the Chairperson of the Election Commission, the action is under the order of the Registrar so it is not subject to the Organic Act on the Election Commission of B.E. 2541 or bound by the Election Commission's regulation.
4. The Organic Act of the Constitution of the Kingdom of Thailand of B.E. 2540 has an equal legal standing with other general legislations. Since there has been no new legislation to either revoke or replace it, hence the cause for party dissolution that occurred before is still valid and the action that breached the Organic Act still continues to be a breach.
5. The Thai Rak Thai Party has no legal ground, under Section 262 of the Constitution of the Kingdom of Thailand B.E. 2540, to rebut or question the legitimacy of the legal provision to punish political parties under Organic Act on Political Parties of B.E. 2541 Sections 66(2), (3) and (4). This is because, under Section 262 of the Constitution, the right to rebut is only given to members of the House of Representatives, the Senate, and the Prime Minister.
6. The Constitutional Court has the power to exercise immediate discretion to dissolve political parties under Section 63 of the Constitution of the Kingdom of Thailand of B.E. 2540, when a political party is found to undermine the Constitutional Monarchy with the King as Head of State or the acquisition of administrative power over the country through means not in accordance with the Constitution, without having to first issue an order to a political party to cease actions under paragraph 2.
7. Even though the election on 2 April B.E. 2549 was annulled by the Administrative Court, it does not nullify any previous wrongdoing.
8. It is found on a factual basis that:
  1. The Thai Rak Thai Party had hired the Pattana Chart Thai Party and the Pandin Thai Party,
  2. The Pattana Chart Thai Party and the Pandin Thai Party agreed to be hired by the Thai Rak Thai Party to assist the Thai Rak Thai Party,
  3. The Pattana Chart Thai together with the Election Commission's officers amended information about Pattana Chart Thai party members to the meet 90 day requirement with the support of the Thai Rak Thai Party.
  4. The Pattana Chart Thai Party and the Pandin Thai Party issued fraudulent letters of certification for their party members as a document for the registration of election candidates.
9. In addition to 8., it is found that:
  1. General Thammarak Issarangkura na Ayudhya and Pongsak Raktapongpaisarn were placed by the Thai Rak Thai Party's leader and executive members to manage the prompt return to power of the party. Furthermore, the Thai Rak Thai Party has never held a meeting of executive members to make clarification on the accusation either before or after the election, even though the accusation pose a significant threat to the image of the Thai Rak Thai Party. Thus, the Constitutional Tribunal deemed the action of General Thammarak and Pongsak to be binding to the Thai Rak Thai Party.
  2. Boontaweesak Amorasil, leader of the Pattana Chart Thai Party, was involved in the amendment of its party membership records and received money from General Thammarak as a representative of the Pattana Chart Thai Party. These actions are deemed to be binding to the Pattana Chart Thai Party.
  3. Bunyabaramipon Chinarat, leader of the Pandin Thai Party, acknowledged and consented for Mrs. Thattima Pawali to receive money from General Thammarak, as well as issued fraudulent letters of certification for his party members. These actions are deemed to be binding to the Pandin Thai Party.
10. The action of the Thai Rak Thai Party is deemed to violate the Constitution under section 66(1) and (3) of the Organic Act on Political Parties of B.E. 2541. The action of the Pattana Chart Thai Party and the Pandin Thai Party is deemed to violate section 66(2) and (3) of the Organic Act on Political Parties of B.E. 2541.
11. By violating section 66(1) and (3) of the Organic Act on Political Parties of B.E. 2541, the Thai Rak Thai Party did not uphold the key principle of democratic form of government and did not respect the law of the country. It could not maintain the form of political party that created or sustained political legitimacy to the democratic form of government of the country as a whole. Therefore, there is a reasonable cause for the dissolution of the Thai Rak Thai Party. As for the Pattana Chart Thai Party and the Pandin Thai Party, they were established for the benefit of the founders or the executive members committee of their respective Parties. They did not have any status as political parties. Therefore, there is a reasonable cause for the dissolution of the Pattana Chart Thai Party and the Pandin Thai Party.
12. The Announcement of the Council for Democratic Reform No. 27 is applicable to the cause of party dissolution under the Organic Act on Political Parties of B.E. 2541, Sections 1, 2, and 3.
13. The Announcement of the Council for Democratic Reform No. 27 dated 30 September B.E. 2549 provides that the revocation of election rights, for a five-year period following an order for a dissolution of a political party, is not a criminal penalty. Hence, the Announcement of the Council for Democratic Reform No. 27, Section 3 has a retroactive binding effect.
14. The revocation of election rights is to apply to all political party's executive members at the time those acts occurred, even if they have resigned from their position before the date of the ruling, as to be in accordance with The Announcement of the Council for Democratic Reform No. 27.

The Constitution Tribunal hereby issues an order to dissolve the Thai Rak Thai Party, the Pattana Chart Thai Party and the Pandin Thai Party as well as to suspend the electoral rights of 111 executive members of the Thai Rak Thai Party, 19 executive members of the Pattana Chart Thai Party, 3 executive members of Pandin Thai Party, for a period of five years, effective on the date of the order of party dissolution.

=== Verdict on Group 2 (Democrat Party and Prachatippatai Kao Na Party) ===
The Democrat Party was acquitted from all charges. Most significantly, it was ruled that no related evidence supported the charge that they had bribed smaller parties to expose the involvement of high-profile Thai Rak Thai party members in election fraud in April 2006.

The court also ruled that the Democrat Party did not malign Thaksin or urge voters to cast a "no" vote in the election. It also found the party innocent of obstructing a parliamentary candidate from registering in a southern constituency.

==== Summary Verdict ====
After thorough consideration of the petition, rebuttal statements from the Democrat Party and Prachatippatai Kao Na Party, and all of the evidence of the Parties concerned, the Constitutional Tribunal found, on the factual and legal basis, the following:

1. Although the Announcement of the Council for Democratic Reform No. 3 revoked the use of the Constitution of the Kingdom of Thailand B.E. 2540, the Organic Act on Election of Members of Parliament and Senators B.E. 2541 was not revoked nor replaced by new legislation. Therefore, the Organic Act on Election of Members of Parliament and Senators B.E. 2541 is still applicable.
2. According to Article 67 of the Organic Act on Political Parties, the Registrar of the political parties is solely responsible for the filing of cases to the Attorney-General, for submission to the Constitutional Court, not the Election Commission.
3. The fact that the Attorney-General filed a petition, against the Democrat Party to the Constitutional Court, on only 4 issues instead of the original 8 by the Registrar of the political parties does NOT conflict with Article 67 paragraph 1 of the Organic Act on Political Parties. This is because it is not the case where the Attorney-General decided on to file the petition.
4. The ruling by Constitutional Court that the general election of the members of Parliament held on 2 April B.E.2549 was an unlawful election under the Constitution of Thailand does not nullify or revoke acts of political parties, since the scope of the ruling only applies to the actions of the Election Commission.
5. On charges alleging the Democrat Party's leader and executive members of 1. Maligning Pol. Col. Thaksin Shinawatra while serving as Prime Minister, and 2. Inducing people to cast a 'no vote' for any candidate or party in every constituency, the Constitutional Tribunal ruled that:
  1. Since Pol. Col. Thaksin Shinawatra was, at the time, the Prime Minister thus he was a public figure. Therefore, such acts were considered lawful under the people's right to free speech.
  2. The speech encouraging people to cast a 'no vote' at the ballot is a given right under Article 326(4) of the Constitution of the Kingdom of Thailand B.E.2540 and Article 56 of the Organic Act on Election of Members of Parliament and Senators Act B.E.2541,
6. On the charge alleging the Democrat Party, through Taksanai Keesun, of conspiring to defame the Thai Rak Thai Party by assisting Nipa Junpo, Ratchanu Tangsri and Suwit Ob-oon to illegally submit their candidacy for election, under Prachatippatai Kao Na Party, and then holding a press conference to accuse the Thai Rak Thai Party of hiring them, the Constitutional Tribunal found that:
  1. Taksanai Keesun, a member of Democrat Party and formerly an assistant to Satit, DID knowingly take Nipa Junpo, Ratchanu Tangsri, and Suwit Ob-oon to illegally (under the 90-day membership rule) submit their candidacy.
  2. There was NO evidence to suggest or support that Satit, an executive member of Democrat Party, know or support the action of Taksanai.
  3. From the transcript of the press conference by Suthep Tueksuban, Secretary-General of Democrat Party, there was NO evidence that Suthep Tueksuban accused the Thai Rak Thai Party of hiring these candidates.
7. On the charge alleging the Democrat Party, through Taikorn Polsuwan, of hiring Watawarit Tantipirom, leader of the Shewitteedekwa (Better Life) Party, to make allegations against Suwat Lipatapanlop, an executive member of Thai Rak Thai Party, the tribunal found the charge to be UNJUSTIFIED. The Tribunal believes that Taikorn was ONLY seeking evidence from Watawarit, since Taikorn thought Watawarit's party may have hired by the Thai Rak Thai Party to contest in the general election.
8. On the charge alleging the Democrat Party of obstructing the submission of candidacy for the election of Pattama Chaikate in Songkla Province, the Tribunal believes that there was an obstruction. However, there was NO evidence to suggest that any MPs or executive members of the Democrat Party took part in such actions.
9. On the charge alleging the Prachatippatai Kao Na Party of issuing fraudulent letter of certification for 3 party members for the submission of candidacy for the election (knowing that they are ineligible under the 90-day rule), the Tribunal believes that Miss Issara or Pornnarin Youngprasit DID issue those letters knowing that they are ineligible.

The Announcement of the Council for Democratic Reform No. 27 dated 30 September B.E. 2549 provides that the revocation of election rights of party executives, for a five-year period following an order for a dissolution of a political party, is not a criminal penalty. Hence, the Announcement of the Council for Democratic Reform No. 27, Section 3 has a retroactive binding effect for this party dissolution case.

The Tribunal concludes that the Democrat Party did not commit the act as had been accused, and hereby dismisses the case and request to dissolve the Democrat Party.

The Prachatippatai Kao Na Party, however, did commit the act as had been accused, which is considered a violation of Article 66(2) and (3) of the Organic Act on Political Parties B.E. 2541. The Tribunal, therefore, issued the order to dissolve the Prachatippatai Kao Na Party and withdraw the election rights of its 9 party executives for 5 years, in accordance with Announcement of the Council for Democratic Reform No. 27 (3).

== Criticisms ==
The verdict came not without criticisms. Although conducted independently, the trial was made at a time when the military junta, understandably hostile to the Thai Rak Thai, was staying in power. Furthermore, the constitutional judges, although consisting of high-profile judges renowned for their autonomy, were arbitrarily hand-picked by the military soon after they came to power.

The introduction of Announcement No. 27 (Section 3) by the Council for Democratic Reform dated 30 September B.E. 2549 (2006), was also a spot of criticism. Whether or not the Announcement can be applied retroactively to charges committed before the Announcement was enacted and enforced is controversial. On the one hand, it can be argued that the CDR's Announcement earned a law status at the time it was announced. On the other hand, however, making an act punishable as a crime when such an act was not an offense when committed—so-called ex post facto law—is, some argued, unjustifiable. This was reflected by the non-unanimous 6-3 vote in favor of the application of the Announcement. Chief Judge Panya Thanomrod, voting against the use of Announcement No. 27 (Section 3), held that barring individuals from politics is a serious charge and that individuals have the right to know in advance any possible punishment they will receive as a result of conducting a particular action.

== Implications for Thai Politics ==
The historical ruling by the Constitutional Tribunal will be likely to set standards of conduct and behaviors for Thai politicians in the years to come. The ruling is also likely to have huge repercussions on Thai politics in several aspects. First, the court ruling suggests that serious violations of election law committed by any party's executive committee member are deemed wrongdoings committed on behalf of the political party itself.

Second, the ruling raises controversy as to whether violations of election law can be construed as criminal actions. The legal system in Thailand, and in other legally similar countries, stipulate that criminal actions must not be subjected to any punitive act that is enacted and enforced after the offenses have been committed.

Third, the judiciary emerged strong as one of the three sovereign powers in the Thai political landscape, counterbalancing the traditionally powerful executive and legislative branches.

Fourth, leaders of several factions that were later split from the disbanded TRT were barred from politics for five years, including TRT's party leader Chaturon Chaisang, former Thaksin's close aide and hopeful premiere candidate Somkid Jatusripitak, Macchima faction leader Somsak Thepsuthin, and Suwat Liptapanlop. It is uncertain how the absence of these high-profile politicians will influence the outcome of the elections to be held by the end of 2007.

Fifth, soon after the ruling became public, Sonthi Boonyaratglin, the leader of the Council for Democratic Reform, announced publicly that selective amnesty to the punished politicians was being considered. Sonthi stressed that the amnesty aimed to bring the country back to reconciliation. The possible amnesty will add to the heated public debate. Thailand will be once again put under challenge as to which direction the country is heading.

== Relevant Thai laws ==
=== Announcement by the Council for Democratic Reform No. 27 ===
Amendment of Announcement by Council for Democratic Reform No. 15 dated 21 September BE 2549 (2006)

Pursuant to the Announcement by the Council for Democratic Reform No. 15 dated 21 September BE 2549 (2006) continuing the force of Organic Act on Political Party BE 2541 (1998). So as to attest the force of such law as well as to stipulate the disfranchisement of whom contravening the said law, be it, therefor, announced by the Council for Democratic Reform as follows:

- Section 1. Section 1 of the Announcement by the Council for Democratic Reform No. 15 dated 21 September BE 2549 (2006) shall be abrogated and replaced by the followings:

"Section 1. The abolishment of the Constitution of the Kingdom of Thailand shall not affect the Organic Act on Political Party BE 2541 (1998). The Organic Act on Political Party BE 2541 (1998) shall remain in force until the amendment or abrogation by law."

- Section 2. The ban on political gatherings or activities of political party in accordance with the Announcement by the Council for Democratic Reform No. 15 dated 21 September BE 2549 (2006) shall remain in force otherwise abrogated by the Council of Ministers.
- Section 3. In the case that Constitutional Court or other organisation acting as the Constitutional Court issues order dissolving any political party owing to the contravention of the Organic Act on Political Party BE 2541 (1998), the executive members of such political party shall be banned from elections for five years as from the date the dissolving order is issued.
- Section 4. Any person whose right on elections is disfranchised by the order of the Court in accordance with the Organic Act on Election of Members of House of Representatives and Senators BE 2541 (1998) prior to the enforcement of the Announcement by the Council for Democratic Reform No. 15 dated 21 September BE 2549 (2006), the right on elections of such person shall still be disfranchised in accordance with the judiciary order.

Announced on 30 September BE 2549 (2006)

General Sonthi Boonyaratglin

Leader of the Council for Democratic Reform

[Published in the Government Gazette, vol. 123, pt. 105 ko, dated 1 October BE 2549 (2006)].

=== Act amending CDR Announcement No. 15 ===
Act

Amendment of the Announcement by the Council for Democratic Reform No. 15 Banning the Political Gatherings and Any Other Political Activities dated 21 September BE 2549 (2006) BE 2550 (2007)

Bhumibol Adulyadej, Rex

Given on the 12th Day of August BE 2550 (2007)

Being the 62nd Year of the Present Reign

Phra Bat Somdet Phra Poramin Maha Bhumibol Adulyadej is gracious pleased to proclaim that:

Whereas it is expedient to amend the Announcement by the Council for Democratic Reform No. 15 banning the political gatherings and any other political activities dated 21 September B.E. 2549 (2006);

Be it, therefor, enacted by the King, by and with the advice and consent of the National Legislative Assembly, as follows:

- Section 1. This Act is called the "Act on Amendment of the Announcement by the Council for Democratic Reform No. 15 Banning the Political Gatherings and Any Other Political Activities dated 21 September BE 2549 (2006) BE 2550 (2007)".
- Section 2. This Act shall come into force as from the day following the date of its publication in the Government Gazette.
- Section 3. Section 2 of the Announcement by the Council for Democratic Reform No. 15 banning the political gatherings and any other political activities dated 21 September BE 2549 (2006) shall be abrogated.

Countersigned by

General Surayud Chulanont

Prime Minister

Note: The ground on promulgation of this Act is pursuant to the Announcement by the Council for Democratic Reform No. 15 banning the political gatherings and any other political activities dated 21 September B.E. 2549 (2006) which constitutes the interim ban on installment and registration of the political parties. The Council of Ministers, thereafter, passed a resolution permitting the installment and registration of the political parties. It is, therefor, necessary to enact this Act.

[Published in the Government Gazette, vol. 124, pt. 44 ko, dated 17 August BE 2550 (2007), pp. 4-6.].

== Literature ==
- Björn Dressel (November 2010), "Judicialization of politics or politicization of the judiciary? Considerations from recent events in Thailand", The Pacific Review, 23 (5): 671–691, doi:10.1080/09512748.2010.521253
