= Regional diplomacy =

Regional diplomacy refers to the interactions between states through regional organizations. Regional diplomacy (RD) has become a strong force in international relations. Globalization and interdependence have made all states aware, that neighborhood cooperation works to mutual benefit. Small countries see the benefit of numbers, for economic and political advantage. Many regions attempt to emulate successful exemplars, such as the EU, and ASEAN, with varying degrees of success.

== Overview ==
Regional diplomacy is a specific form of multilateral diplomacy that is practiced within a closed circle of neighboring states. The term 'region' used in international affairs is a geography-based political construct in that a priory reason exists to determine the contours of a region, and the way a region is defined depends on those that run a particular regional organization.

Regional diplomacy is of special interest today because in many parts of the world, regional organizations are on the rise, driven by an urge to pursue stronger economic links, and to use this to improve mutual political understanding, and gain in mutual security. The European Union (EU), now consisting of 27 member states, is the world's most advanced practitioner of regional diplomacy, and a role model in most parts of the world.

== See also ==
- Regional organisations by country
- Cultural diplomacy
- Diplomacy
- Economic diplomacy
- Public diplomacy
