= Thai honorifics =

Honorific phenomena in Thai

Honorifics are a class of words or grammatical morphemes that encode a wide variety of social relationships between interlocutors or between interlocutors and referents. Honorific phenomena in Thai include honorific registers, honorific pronominals, and honorific particles.

== Historical development ==
Thai honorifics date back to the Sukhothai Kingdom, a period which lasted from 1238 to 1420 CE. During the Sukhothai period, honorifics appeared in the form of kinship terms. The Sukhothai period also saw the introduction of many Khmer and Pali loanwords to Thai.

Later, in the Ayutthaya Kingdom (1351 to 1767 CE), a new form of honorific speech evolved. While kinship terms continued to be used, a royal vocabulary known as "raja-sap" (Thai: ราชาศัพท์; RTGS: Rachasap, also spelt rajasap and ratchasap) emerged. Raja-sap, an honorific register, was created as a way for commoners and aristocrats alike to talk to and about the king of Thailand. Soon after its creation, the use of royal vocabulary was extended to address all members of the royal family as well as aristocrats. At the same time, a clerical vocabulary used to talk to or about monks arose, very similar to the raja-sap. With the development of royal and clerical vocabularies, means for honorific speech increased significantly.

The Bangkok period saw even greater expansion of the raja-sap as it became the formal, or polite, way to address all peoples or topics. Specifically, lexical items from honorific registers replaced native Thai pronouns, resulting in an entirely new set of pronominal forms. Kinship terms continued to be used as honorifics, and a new type of honorific emerged as well, polite particles.

Following the Siamese revolution of 1932, raja-sap fell out of daily use in Thailand. By the end of World War II, popular media used the most informal term for the king, nai luang. In the 1960s, raja-sap was revived by royalists as an anchor for the Thai monarchy, alongside court customs like mandatory prostration to the royal family, which had officially ended during the reign of Chulalongkorn.

== Honorific registers ==
The roots of Thai honorific registers lie in Khmer and Khmer-Indic (Pali or Sanskrit words borrowed first into Khmer, then from Khmer into Thai) loanwords. Khmer and Khmero-Indic words were originally borrowed into Thai by an educated, Thai upper class, specifically kings and monks, in order to discuss Buddhism. When the need for honorific registers arose, the Thai people turned again to Khmer. Borrowing heavily from Khmer, the Thai constructed a royal vocabulary, a large lexicon of Khmer and Khmero-Indic words, appropriate for addressing the monarchy. At the same time, a clerical vocabulary emerged, much smaller but similar in function and origin to the royal vocabulary. The clerical vocabulary, also composed mainly of borrowings from Khmer, enabled the common people to communicate with and about monks. Lexical items from standard Thai, royal vocabulary, and clerical vocabulary are shown side by side in the table below:

English gloss	Standard Thai	Clerical vocabulary	Royal vocabulary
'hand'	/mɯ̄ː/ (มือ)	/mɯ̄ː/ (มือ)	/pʰráʔ hàt/ (พระหัตถ์)
'house'	/bâːn/ (บ้าน)	/kùʔ.tìʔ/ (กุฏิ)	/wāŋ/ (วัง)
'mother'	/mɛ̂ː/ (แม่)	/jōːm mɛ̂ː/ (โยมแม่)	/pʰráʔ tɕʰōn.náʔ.nīː/ (พระชนนี)
'to give'	/hâj/ (ให้)	/tʰàʔ.wǎːj/ (ถวาย)	/tʰàʔ.wǎːj/ (ถวาย)
'to speak'	/pʰûːt/ (พูด)	/pʰûːt/ (พูด)	/tràt/ (ตรัส)
'to sleep'	/nɔ̄ːn/ (นอน)	/tɕām wát/ (จำวัด)	/bān.tʰōm/ (บรรทม)

== Honorific pronominals ==
Thai exhibits pronoun avoidance, often using kinship or status terms instead, particularly for social equals or superiors.

=== Personal pronouns ===
Personal pronouns are the most numerous and complex of pronominal forms in Thai. Personal pronouns may make the following semantic distinctions:

1. Number: singular, plural, ambiguous
2. Person: first person, second person, third person, ambivalent
3. Gender
  1. Primary distinctions are distinctions of gender that are inherent to pronouns: male, female
  2. Secondary distinctions are distinctions of gender that depend on the presence or absence of other semantic features like status, intimacy, or non-restraint: male orientation, female orientation, neutral orientation
4. Age: absolute, relative
5. Speaker-addressee-referent relationship
  1. Primary distinctions
    1. Status-the status of the speaker relative to an addressee or referent. Status may be determined by relative age (elders have higher status), rank (king>royalty>monks>government and military>professionals>white collar>blue collar), or non-intimacy (strangers are treated as at least equals)
    2. Intimacy - the kind and degree of close, day-by-day association
    3. Non-restraint
  2. Secondary distinctions
    1. Deference
    2. Politeness
    3. Assertiveness

=== Kinship terms ===
Kinship terms are used pronominally to elevate or demonstrate solidarity with an addressee. To address a listener as kin is, in effect, to confer the listener with the same status as the aforementioned kin. Generally, kinship terms contain both literal and displaced meanings. Kinship terms are considered literal in cases of blood kin, affinal kin, and teknonymy. They are considered displaced when used with kinlike individuals: intimate friends of kin or kin of intimate friends. When using kinship terms, age is critical. Speakers must estimate the age of an addressee to determine his or her generation and choose an appropriate kinship term. Kinship terms commonly used as honorific pronominals are summarized in the table below.

English gloss	Thai
'father'	พ่อ /pʰɔ̂ː/
'mother'	แม่ /mɛ̂ː/
'older sibling'	พี่ /pʰîː/
'younger sibling'	น้อง /nɔ́ːŋ/
'child'	ลูก /lûːk/
'grandchild/niece/nephew'	หลาน /lǎːn/
'great grandchild'	เหลน /lěːn/
'great great grandchild'	ลื่อ /lɯ̂ː/
'great great great grandchild'	ลืบ /lɯːp/
'great great great great grandchild'	ลืด /lɯːt/
'uncle (parent's older brother)'	ลุง /lūŋ/
'aunt (parent's older sister)'	ป้า /pâː/
'aunt/uncle (mother's younger sibling)'	น้า /náː/
'aunt/uncle (father's younger sibling)'	อา /ʔāː/
'first cousin (older sibling of parent's child)'	ลูกพี่ /lûːk pʰîː/
'first cousin (younger sibling of parent's child)'	ลูกน้อง /lûːk nɔ́ːŋ/
'grandfather (father's father)'	ปู่ /pùː/
'grandmother (father's mother)'	ย่า /jâː/
'grandfather (mother's father)'	ตา /tāː/
'grandmother (mother's mother)'	ยาย /jāːj/
'great grandparent'	ทวด /tʰûat/
'great great grandparent'	เทียด /tʰîat/

Speakers may demonstrate additional respect by adding the polite title khun (คุณ) before any kinship term. Kinship terms are commonly followed by personal names or nicknames.

=== Status terms ===
Status terms denote referents in terms of occupation or status. While some status terms are used as first, second, or third person pronouns, others are restricted to second and third person only. Many pronominal status terms are preceded by titles. Status terms may also be used as titles before given names. A few status terms frequently used as pronominals are presented in the table below:

Thai	English gloss
อาจารย์ /ʔāː.tɕāːn/	'teacher/professor'
ศาสตราจารย์ /sàːt.trāː.tɕāːn/	'professor' (of university)
ครู /kʰrūː/	'teacher' (of school)
หมอ /mɔ̌ː/	'doctor'
พยาบาล /pʰáʔ.jāː.bāːn/	'nurse'
กระเป๋า /kràʔ.pǎw/	'bus fare collector' (pocketbook)
สามล้อ /sǎːm lɔ́ː/	'pedicab driver' (tricycle)
แท็กซี่ /tʰɛ́k.sîː/	'taxi driver' (taxicab)
ตุ๊กตุ๊ก /túk.túk/	'motorized pedicab driver'
ท่านทูต /tʰâːn tʰûːt/	'Mister/Madame Ambassador'
ท่านอธิบดี /tʰâːn ʔàʔ.tʰíʔ.bɔ̄ː.dīː/	'Mister/Madame Director General'
ท่านอธิการบดี /tʰâːn ʔàʔ.tʰíʔ.kāːn.bɔ̄ː.dīː/	'Mister/Madame Rector' (of university)
ท่านผู้ว่า /tʰâːn pʰûː wâː/	'Governor' (of administration)
ท่านนายก /tʰâːn nāː.jók/	'Mayor' (of administration)
ท่านรัฐมนตรี /tʰâːn rát.tʰàʔ.mōn.trīː/	'Mister/Madame Minister' (of state)
ท่านนายกรัฐมนตรี /tʰâːn nāː.jók rát.tʰàʔ.mōn.trīː/	'Mister/Madame Prime Minister'

=== Names ===
In Thai, a person's full name consists of a given name followed by a surname or family name. In addition, most individuals have a nickname. As pronominals, given names are used most frequently in second person form. Given names are often preceded by the courtesy title khun when addressing friends or acquaintances. Given names are sometimes truncated to convey mild informality. Nicknames, like given names, are used most often in second person. They generally do not take titles. Nicknames are a friendly, affectionate way to show intimacy between interlocuters.

== Honorific particles ==
Honorific particles are added to the end of an utterance or clause to show respect to the addressee. Honorific particles may exhibit the following semantic distinctions:

1. Gender: male, female, neutral
2. Status: superior, equal, inferior
3. Social mood: a continuum ranging from formal at one end to extremely intimate at the other
4. Illocutionary force: affirmative, imperative, interrogative

Polite particles are not used in conjunction with honorific registers or in written language. Commonly used polite particles are summarized in the table below.

Thai	Gender	Status of addressee	Social mood	Illocutionary force
ขอรับ /kʰɔ̌ː ráp/	male	superior	formal-royal	affirmative/imperative/interrogative
ครับ /kʰráp/	male	equal/superior	common	affirmative/imperative/interrogative
เจ้าขา /tɕâːw kʰǎː/	female	superior	formal-royal	affirmative/imperative/interrogative
ค่ะ /kʰâʔ/	female	equal/superior	common	affirmative/imperative
คะ /kʰáʔ/	female	equal/superior	common	interrogative

== Honorific titles ==
=== Thanphuying and khunying ===
Thanphuying (ท่านผู้หญิง /tʰâːn pʰûː.jǐŋ/) and khunying (คุณหญิง /kʰūn.jǐŋ/) were originally titles for wives of nobles of chaophraya and phraya rank, respectively. Today they are used as titles for married/widowed female recipients of the Order of Chula Chom Klao. Those of the rank Dame Grand Commander and above use the title thanphuying, while others use khunying. Unmarried recipients use the title khun, which is the same word as § Khun (courtesy title) below.

=== Khun (courtesy title) ===
Khun (คุณ /kʰūn/), a courtesy title pronounced with a mid tone, should not be confused with the noble title of khun (ขุน /kʰǔn/, pronounced in a rising tone). Today, this word is used informally to courteously address nearly anyone.
