= Pita Limjaroenrat =

Thai businessman and politician (born 1980)

- พิธา ลิ้มเจริญรัตน์
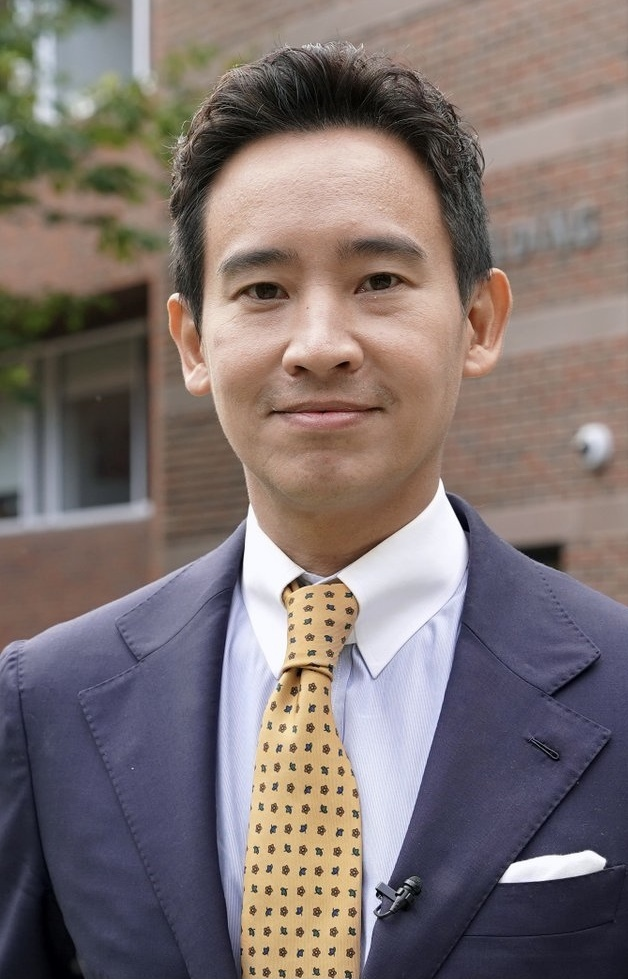
- Pita in 2023

Leader of the Move Forward Party
- In office 14 March 2020 – 23 September 2023
- Preceded by: Thanathorn Juangroongruangkit (Future Forward Party; de facto)
- Succeeded by: Chaithawat Tulathon

Advisory Chair of the Move Forward Party
- In office 23 September 2023 – 7 August 2024
- Leader: Chaithawat Tulathon
- Preceded by: Position established
- Succeeded by: Position abolished

Member of the House of Representatives
- In office 24 March 2019 – 7 August 2024 (Note: Suspended by the Constitutional Court from 19 July 2023 to 24 January 2024.)
- Constituency: Party-list

Personal details
- Born: 5 September 1980 (age 46) Bangkok, Thailand
- Party: People's (since 2024) (de facto)
- Other political affiliations: Future Forward (2018–2020); Move Forward (2020–2024); Progressive Movement (since 2024)
- Spouse: Chutima Teepanart (m. 2012; div. 2019)
- Children: 1
- Education: Thammasat University (BBA); Harvard University (MPA); Massachusetts Institute of Technology (MBA)
- Occupation: Businessman; politician; author
- Website: Campaign website
- Nickname: Tim (ทิม)
- Pita Limjaroenrat's voice Pita Limjaroenrat on democratic backsliding in Thailand; Recorded 10 May 2023

Pita Limjaroenrat (Thai: พิธา ลิ้มเจริญรัตน์, RTGS: Phitha Limcharoenrat [pʰí(ʔ).tʰāː lím.tɕā.rɤ̄ːn.rát]; born 5 September 1980), nicknamed Tim (Thai: ทิม, RTGS: Thim), is a Thai businessman and former politician who served as Leader of the Move Forward Party, the de facto successor to the dissolved Future Forward Party, from 2020 to 2023, and then as the advisory chair of the party from 2023 to 2024. He was also a member of the House of Representatives from 2019 to 2024.

Educated in New Zealand, Pita studied finance in Thailand. He further studied politics and business in the United States, having received various scholarships. Upon his return to Thailand in 2005, he took over his family's rice bran oil company and helped it gain its foothold. After obtaining a master's degree in the US, he continued his work in business. In 2019, Pita was approached by the pro-democracy Future Forward Party to be a party-list candidate for the 2019 general election. He accepted and ultimately won a seat in the House of Representatives. Upon the dissolution of Future Forward in 2020, Pita was selected to lead the newly formed Move Forward Party.

Pita led Move Forward to become the largest party in the 2023 general election, winning 151 seats. Forming a coalition with fellow pro-democracy parties, he announced plans to be elected prime minister of Thailand. In the first round of parliamentary voting on 13 July 2023, he was not elected by the National Assembly, as he lacked the votes from the Senate. Later, on 19 July, he was suspended as an MP by the Constitutional Court over shares in the defunct broadcaster iTV. Pita's second nomination on the same day was blocked by the National Assembly.

Move Forward ultimately joined the opposition following a dispute with their initial coalition partner, Pheu Thai Party. Pita resigned as leader of Move Forward in September 2023. He was succeeded by Chaithawat Tulathon, but remained active in the party. On 24 January, the Constitutional Court cleared him of wrongdoing, securing his status as a member of the House of Representatives. On 7 August 2024, more than a year after the general election, the Move Forward Party was disbanded by the Constitutional Court in a ruling that banned Pita and other party executives from politics for ten years. He subsequently supported and became a member of the reincarnation of Move Forward, the People's Party. Later that month, he began a fellowship at Harvard Kennedy School of Harvard University.

== Early life and education ==
Pita Limjaroenrat was born in Bangkok on 5 September 1980, as the eldest of two children of Pongsak Limjaroenrat, who previously served as an adviser to the Minister of Agriculture and Cooperatives and Linda Limjaroenrat. His uncle, Padung Limjaroenrat, was a former secretary to the Minister of Interior and closely associated with then-Prime Minister Thaksin Shinawatra. Pita is of Hainanese descent and has once mentioned that his surname was based on his family's original surname Lim. Pita's maternal grandmother, Anusri, once owned a house in Battambang, Cambodia, although he neither claims lineage from the Aphaiwong family nor Cambodian descent.

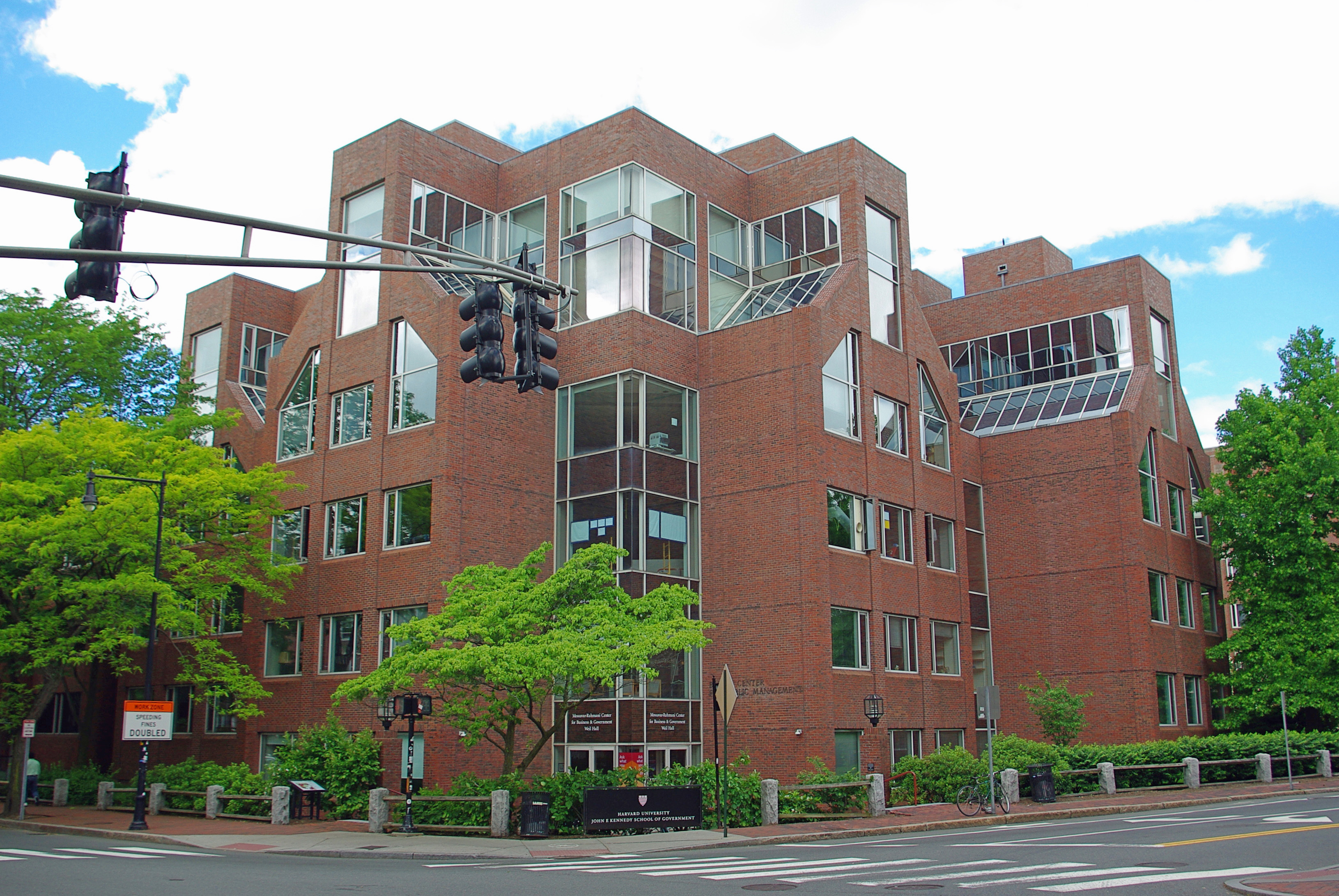
Harvard Kennedy School

Pita's education began at Bangkok Christian College. At the age of 11, he moved to Hamilton, New Zealand, He attended St John's College for his secondary education. He was living in Hamilton, staying with a middle-class host family, at the same time as future New Zealand prime minister Jacinda Ardern, with whom he would later attend Harvard University. During his time in New Zealand, he took on part-time jobs, including delivering newspapers and milk, to support himself. His interest in politics was sparked in an unexpected way: due to the limited television options, which were mostly Australian soap operas or parliamentary debates, he found himself drawn to the political discussions. This exposure, particularly to speeches by Jim Bolger, then the Prime Minister of New Zealand, played a significant role in developing his political interests.

After completing his secondary education in New Zealand, Pita returned to Thailand and enrolled in Thammasat University, where he pursued a bachelor's degree in finance at the Faculty of Commerce and Accountancy. He graduated in 2002 with first-class honors and received a scholarship to study at the University of Texas at Austin. During his time in Austin, the 2000 U.S. presidential election unfolded, which Pita notes had a significant impact on his political views. He then earned an international student scholarship to Harvard University, making him the first Thai student to achieve this distinction. Pita has expressed that his experiences at Harvard greatly influenced his political beliefs and future policy goals. In 2004, he worked for a policy team led by Suvit Maesincee, a future Minister of Higher Education, Science Research and Innovation.

Pita's engagement in political circles extended to his involvement with economic advisor Somkid Jatusripitak. This included accompanying then-Prime Minister Thaksin to New York City for a United Nations General Assembly meeting in September 2006. However, Thaksin, who had written Pita's recommendation letter for Harvard, was unable to deliver his speech due to a military coup on 19 September, leading to his departure for London.

Following the coup, upon his return to Thailand, Pita faced a brief detention, which caused him to miss part of his father's funeral. He continued his academic journey by completing a joint Master in Public Administration degree at the Harvard Kennedy School of Harvard University and a Master of Business Administration degree at the Sloan School of Management of the Massachusetts Institute of Technology in 2011. While at Harvard, Pita worked at the Boston Consulting Group as a management consultant.

== Business career ==
At the age of 25, Pita returned to Thailand to take over as managing director of CEO Agrifood, a rice bran oil business run by his family, after the death of his father. The company had been laden with debt, but was able to regain its foothold two years after and allowed Pita to return to the United States where he finished his master's degree in 2011.

He also served as the executive director of Grab Thailand from 2017 to 2018.

== Political career ==
=== Member of the House of Representatives ===
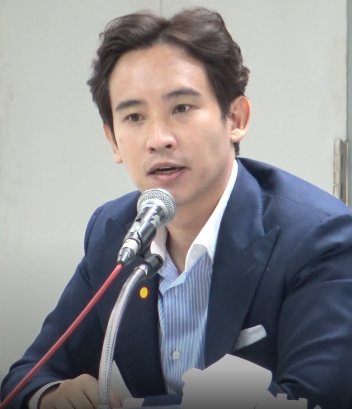
Pita speaking in 2020.

Pita aspired to become a politician since he was in his 20s. He became a member of the Future Forward Party following an invitation from the party leader Thanathorn Juangroongruangkit. He ran as a candidate in the 2019 general election and was elected as the fourth party-list representative for his party in the House of Representatives. (Note: He became the third party-list representative after the first party-list representative and party leader Thanathorn Juangroongruangkit was disqualified by Thailand's constitutional court in November 2019.)

In July 2019, Pita gave a speech in the House of Representatives about the "Five-Button Theory." This theory highlighted the need for government focus on key agricultural policies, including land ownership, farmers' debts, cannabis, agro-tourism, and water resources. His speech, notable for transcending party lines, received commendation from Interior Minister Anupong Paochinda.

Following the dissolution of the Future Forward Party by the Constitutional Court on 21 February 2020, Pita was chosen as the leader of the Move Forward Party, second incarnation and successor of Future Forward Party. He, along with 54 former members of parliament from the disbanded party, joined this new party. Pita's formal election as the leader of the Move Forward Party occurred on 14 March 2020. He would later describe himself as the "designated survivor" to lead the new party.

During the COVID-19 pandemic, Pita criticised the government for a "systematic failure of the entire vaccine value chain" starting from the initial vaccine procurement strategy.

In October 2021, he confirmed he would be the party's nominee for prime minister after the next general election.

=== 2023 general election ===
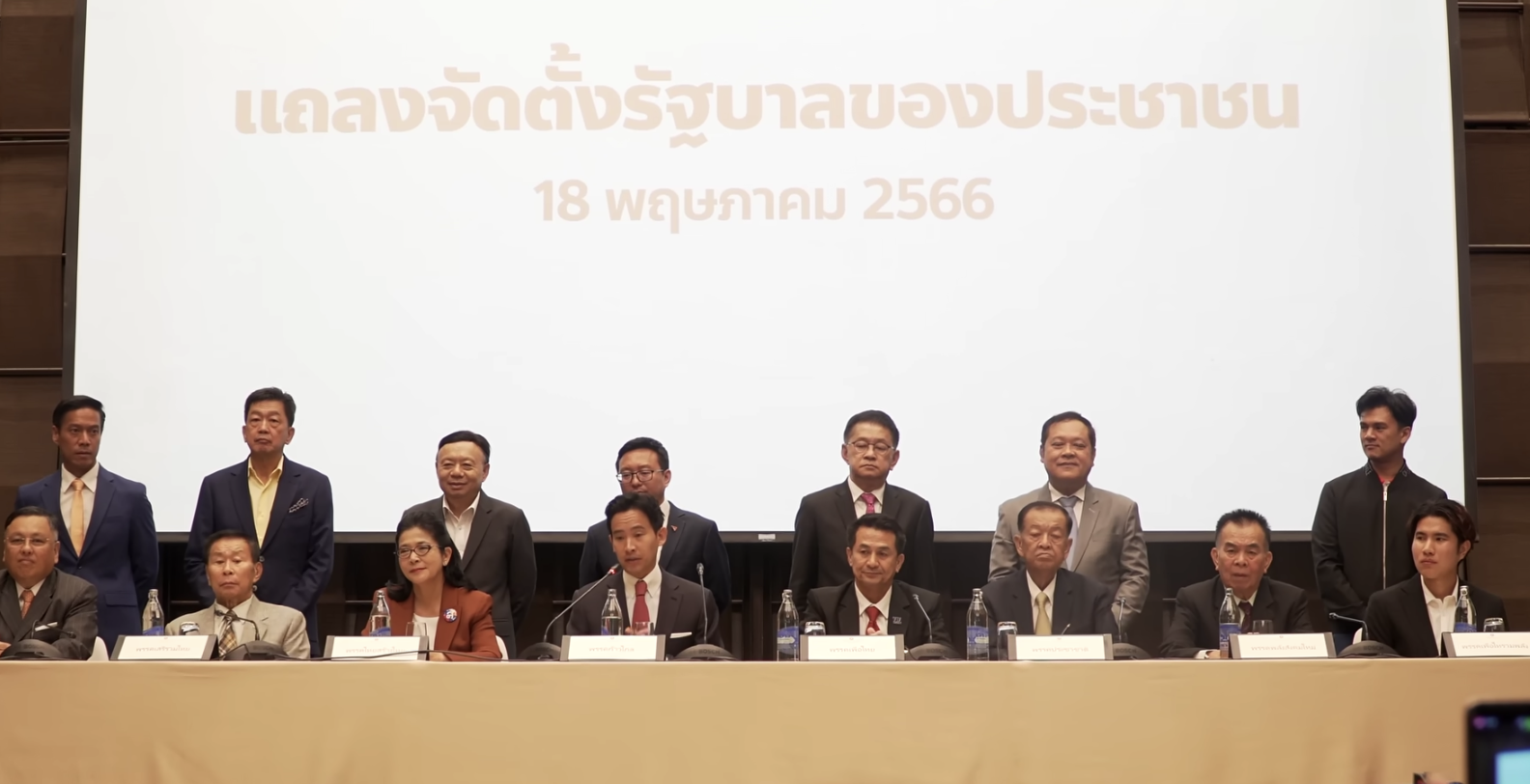
Pita announces a government formation following the 2023 general election, 18 May 2023

Pita, leading the Move Forward Party, achieved a notable victory in the 2023 general election, securing the most seats (151). Pita's goal was to win 160 out of the 400 constituency seats. This outcome was unexpected for many, as the Pheu Thai party was widely anticipated to be the frontrunner. Following this victory, on 15 May 2023, Pita expressed his readiness to assume the role of prime minister. As no party commanded a majority, a coalition would have to be formed in order to elect the next prime minister. Move Forward and other parties believed Pita had commanded a mandate to lead the next government, as his party had won the most seats in the election. He reached out to the Pheu Thai Party and several smaller pro-democracy parties, proposing the formation of a coalition government.

On 22 May, Pita and his coalition partners held a press conference, where they focused on key issues such as drafting a new constitution through the constituent assembly, implementing military reforms, introducing voluntary conscription, legalizing same-sex marriage, and decentralizing the economy. Pita also mentioned that his campaign strategies were inspired by Barack Obama's 2008 U.S. presidential campaign.

However, despite the coalition's majority in the House of Representatives, Pita needed the support of both elected MPs and unelected senators, who were appointed by the previous military junta, to be officially elected as prime minister.

On 9 June, the Election Commission (EC) dismissed three complaints against Pita concerning his ownership of iTV, a television broadcaster and a unit of Shin Corporation, previously owned by Thaksin Shinawatra, a former prime minister then in exile. The constitution prohibits shareholders of media organizations from participating in general elections. Instead of pursuing these complaints, the EC initiated a criminal investigation to determine if Pita knowingly violated election eligibility rules, specifically sections of the organic law on the election of MPs.

Pita stated that he inherited the iTV shares from his father's estate. iTV had ceased broadcasting in 2007 and was removed from the Stock Exchange of Thailand in 2014. According to Pita, the company hadn't produced significant media-related income for years, except for minor earnings from a subsidiary involved in broadcasting equipment rental. Despite the ongoing investigation by the EC, Pita was among the 500 MPs officially endorsed by the EC on 19 June. On 27 June, he announced having sufficient support from the military-appointed Senate to secure the position of prime minister.

=== Attempts to form a government ===
Prime Minister Vote for Pita Limjaroenrat 2023, Green for Yes and Red for No

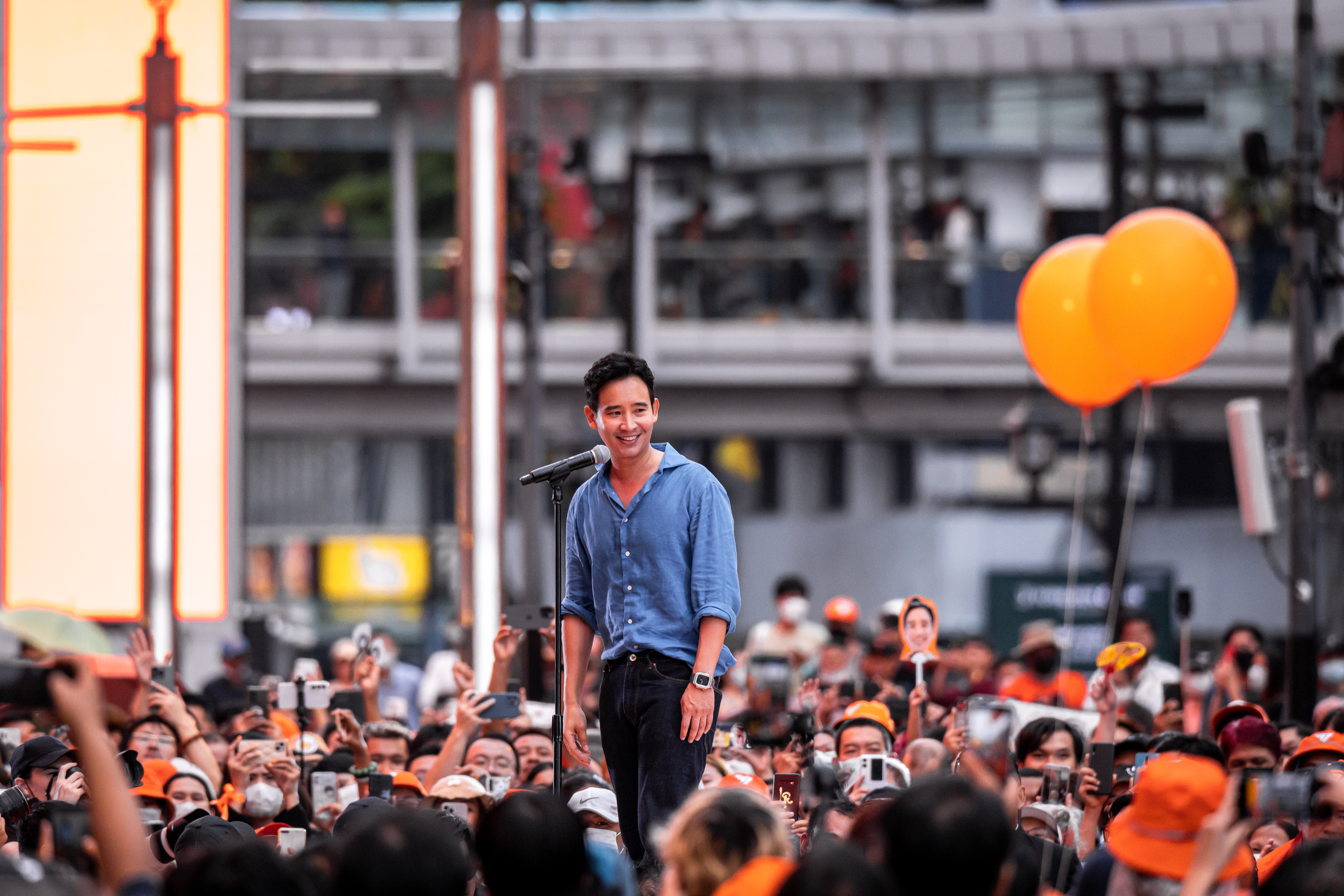
Pita addressing his supporters at CentralWorld shopping plaza in Bangkok on 9 July 2023.

Following the general election and subsequent coalition announcement, the House of Representatives held its first session on 5 July to select a Speaker, Wan Muhamad Noor Matha, founder of the coalition-member party, the Prachachat Party. In the days preceding the premiership vote, Pita and the MFP party held rallies with supporters in Bangkok. Pita appealed to the assembly to support his government, in accordance with the mandate granted by the people in the general election.

On 12 July, the Constitutional Court said it had accepted a complaint against Pita and the Move Forward Party by the Election Commission, that said its plan to reform lèse-majesté laws amounted to an attempt to "overthrow the democratic regime of government with the king as a head of state". The Commission referred Pita for disqualification as an MP; Pita called the process unfair, and said he wasn't allowed to defend himself before the decision. The day before the parliamentary vote, Pita warned assembly members that there would be a "high price" if his premiership was denied.

On 13 July the National Assembly convened to elect a new prime minister. Initially nominated by Pheu Thai leader Chonlanan Srikaew, Pita was the only member of the assembly to be put forward. Despite securing a majority-coalition in the lower house, Pita was unable to win enough votes from the assembly in the first ballot, particularly the 250 members of the Senate, appointed by the National Council for Peace and Order (NCPO) in May 2019, to become the country's next prime minister. 324 members of the National Assembly voted to approve Pita's premiership (311 of which were MPs and 13 of which were junta-appointed senators), 182 disapproved and 199 abstained. Of the 705 votes, Pita fell 51 votes short of a majority, as he required 375 votes in order to be appointed prime minister. Subsequent protests occurred in the evening following the vote; the voting system was criticized for being undemocratic, and contradictory to the mandate given by the people. The failure of the National Assembly to produce a prime minister led to Thai stocks underperforming. The newspaper Khaosod described the vote as a 'trap set in advance.' Despite this, Pita said he would still pursue the role of prime minister, and would not back down on his promise to reform the lèse-majesté law.

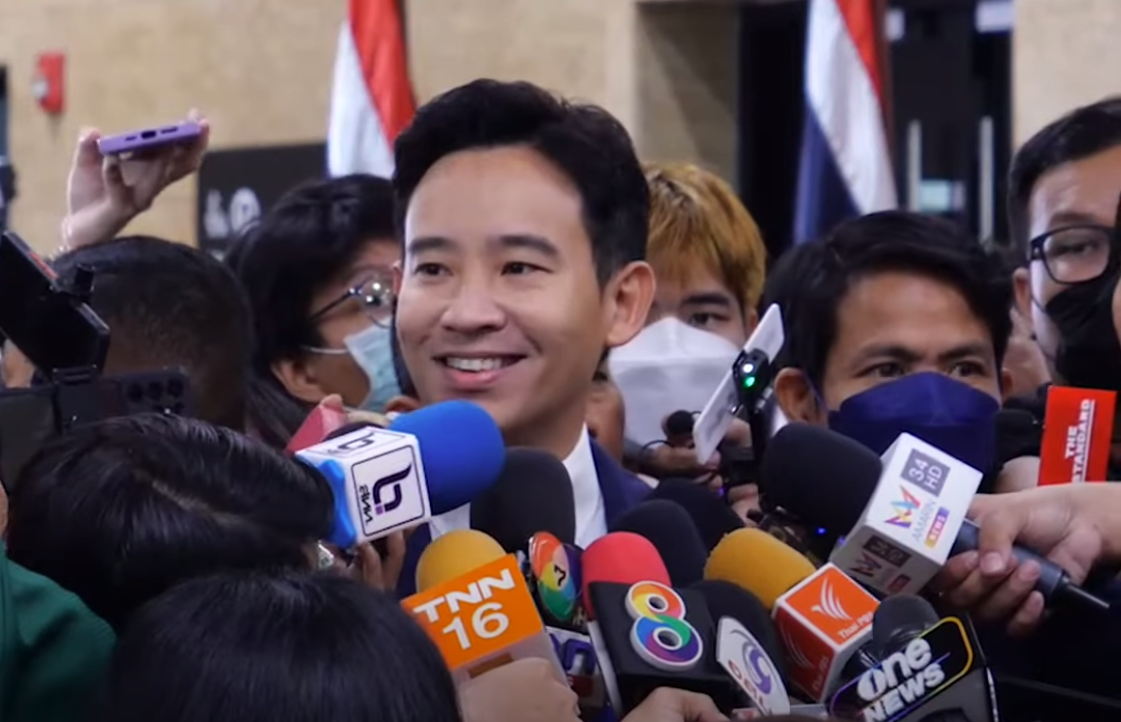
Pita speaking with journalists ten days before the 1st prime ministership election, 3 July 2023.

Protests continued, with many demanding that the senators resign. On 15 July, Pita announced his coalition had agreed to put his name forward for the next round of voting, but also said he was ready to allow a member of the Pheu Thai party to be nominated if his second bid were to be unsuccessful, or if he would be unable to gain significantly more votes than the previous ballot. On 19 July the National Assembly convened to elect a new prime minister for a second time following the general election. On the same day, the Constitutional Court unanimously voted to accept a case against Pita regarding his inherited shares of the defunct iTV. They also voted 7–2 to suspend him from MP duty until it reached a ruling, but it not preclude him from being nominated for prime minister. During the assembly proceedings, Pita announced he would acknowledge the decision, and left the chamber. In the subsequent debate, the National Assembly voted against considering him for another round of voting for prime minister. Pita was nominated by Pheu Thai MP Suthin Klangsaeng, but the proposal was argued to have been against a parliamentary rule prohibiting a repeat motion. At a public speaking event held more than a year later at the University of Melbourne, Pita said that he actually had a plan to "lobby the upper house" to allow him to become prime minister before he was suspended from parliamentary duties. In the voting for his renomination, 312 voters supported, 394 rejected—most of which were senators—eight abstained and one (Pita) did not vote.

=== Brief suspension and resignation ===
In accordance with the vote in the assembly, Pita could not stand for prime minister until a new session after the next general election. Despite being the largest party in the opposition Pita stated he did not have intentions to assume the role as leader of the opposition. Pita's reasoning was that he intended to become prime minister and that the PM position was simply a role to expand Thai democracy. Pita remained under suspension as an MP, but initially signaled his support for a Pheu Thai party PM candidate. On 2 August 2023, Move Forward and Pheu Thai split, as Pheu Thai pulled out of the original coalition to form one of their own. The Pheu Thai party pulled back on their election pledge to not join with pro-junta parties, and the Move Forward party refused to rescind their own election pledge to reform the lèse-majesté law.

"When people ask me 'How do you feel that you have failed?' and I would respond back to them that I won, I formed, and I got blocked. I didn't fail."

- Pita Limjaroenrat

On 22 August, Pheu Thai candidate Srettha Thavisin won the 2nd prime ministership election in the National Assembly of Thailand. All present (149) MFP members voted against Srettha's bid for prime minister. Following Srettha's election as prime minister, Pita gave him a congratulatory phone call. Speaking of Pheu Thai's alliance with military-backed parties to form a government, Pita said he would 'forgive but won't forget.'

On 20 August 2023, Pita began campaigning for the Move Forward party in the run-up to the by-election in Constituency 3 of Rayong province, which was contested by the Move Forward, Democrat and Nation Building Labour party, following the resignation of the Move Forward MP elected there. MFP's candidate, Pongsathorn Sornpetnarin, won the election on 10 September.

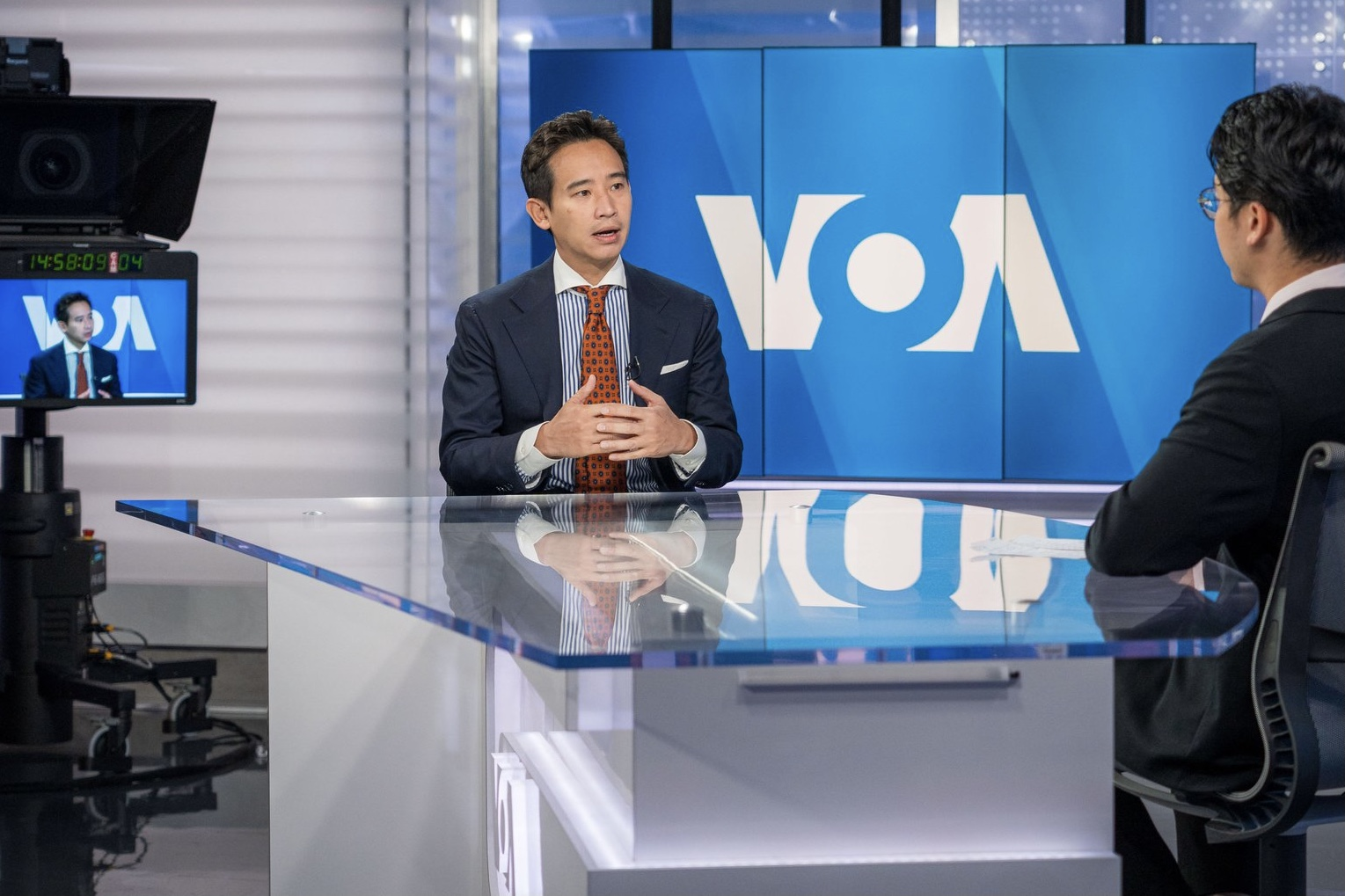
Pita Limjaroenrat speaking with VOA News in Washington D.C.

On 15 September 2023, Pita announced his resignation as Leader of the Move Forward Party. He cited his inability to perform duties in the House, pending a ruling regarding his suspension status as an MP in the Constitutional Court, hindering his ability to become the Leader of the Opposition. In his announcement, Pita stressed the importance of the position of Leader of the Opposition, and said it must provide "checks and balance" to the government. He reiterated he would remain active in Thai politics and the party, regardless of his role. Pita said that Move Forward would select a new leader to replace him on 23 September, who would lead the party and the opposition in the House of Representatives. He was replaced by Secretary-General Chaithawat Tulathon as party leader. Chaithawat said his leadership was part of "temporary restructure", and said he would be "willing to step down once Pita resumes the position as an MP in the parliament again".

During his suspension, Pita criticized the system of government in Thailand, considering his inability to become prime minister un-democratic. Pita embarked on a visit to the United States in October 2023 to discuss the political situation in Thailand. He spoke at various universities, and met with government officials from Australia, New Zealand, and the US. Most notably, he returned to the Harvard Kennedy School, and spoke with students interested in politics about his experience. He cited his work at Harvard partially for his ability to win the election, but criticized the political establishment for blocking him from power. He also received an honorary master's degree and lectured about Thailand and ASEAN at the Harvard Asia Center. He also spoke at MIT. Earlier he met with the Thai diaspora and was honored at the TIME 100 Next gala in New York City.

In the wake of sexual harassment scandals within Move Forward, Pita said he was disappointed and urged the party to adopt more stricter ethic codes. He also apologized to the victims and reiterated Chaithawat's responsibility as party leader. Speaking with AP News in January 2024, he described his political career as a "roller coaster", but also believed his suspension was a detour. Pita believed he still had the legitimacy to lead Thailand, and predicted it could be two to three years before the next election depending on the government's performance. On 15 December, he offered his analysis of the Srethha government's first 100 days in power, at a press conference. He said he approved of some of the steps taken, but that there was work to be done, and that he hoped the government would provide a clear roadmap for 2024. Pita criticized the Srettha government's digital wallet scheme, calling it "old fashioned". On Srettha's premiership, Pita argued his administration should be given more time to prove its ability to lead, while also recommending adjustments in policy.

=== Return to Parliament ===
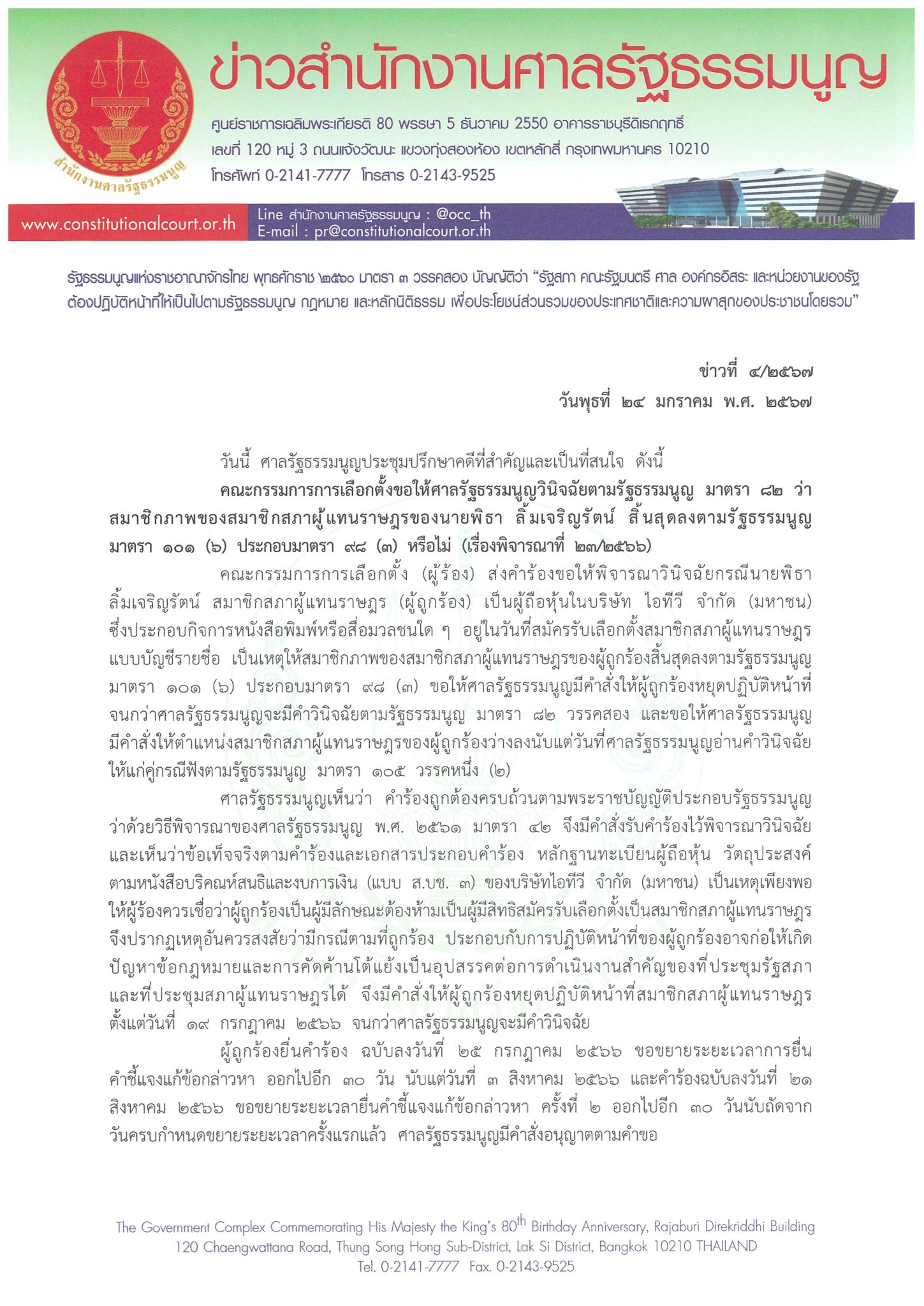
Statement of the Constitutional Court clearing Pita of wrongdoing, allowing his return to the Parliament.

By December, a date was set for 24 January for the verdict in Pita's iTV case. The Constitutional Court extended the original deadline for the case, with Pita permitted to prepare his defense by 12 December, and the hearings beginning by 20 December. He was accused by the Election Commission of holding stocks in a media company and therefore violating Thailand's election laws; the argument being that Pita knowingly applied to run for office in 2019 and 2023 while holding stake in a media company. The defunct 42,000 iTV media shares in questions were inherited from his father after he died, and the company had been defunct since before the election in 2007. The shares had since been transferred to his relatives. Pita welcomed the opportunity to present evidence to the court, and said he was not worried. After preparing a statement on 15 December, he arrived at the Constitutional Court to answer questions and deliver his final testimony relating to the case on 20 December, and expressed confidence in the justice system, believing he "will receive justice". That same day, the court announced it would deliver its verdict at 2:00 PM on 24 January 2024. On the day of the verdict, the court was surrounded by Pita and MFP supporters, warranting increased security. Pita arrived at the court at 12:45 PM on 24 January, along with Chaithawat. After more than 30 minutes of reading the verdict, the Constitutional Court cleared Pita of any wrongdoing, allowing him to return to Parliament. While addressing the press outside the court, Pita said he hoped to return to the legislature "as soon as possible". Upon being reinstated as an MP, Pita set to work in his capacities in the party and in the House, officially returning to the Parliament the next day on 25 January, notably wearing the same tie he wore on the day of his suspension. He outlined Move Forward's six goals for the country the following day, which included a proposed amnesty bill for criminal cases that were political in nature. Pita announced a total of 47 draft bills set to be introduced into the legislature, which included policies for military reforms, quality of life, and rural development. He also dismissed allegations that the party was not doing enough to scrutinize the government. During his policy outline, Pita did not mention reforming the lèse-majesté law, which drew criticism from former Future Forward Party officials. Shortly after his suspension was lifted, Pita met with German president Frank-Walter Steinmeier, during his visit to Thailand in January 2024. Steinmeier commended the decision of the Court to clear Pita, saying it was a sign of democratic progress in the country. When interviewed by Harvard International Review in February, Pita warned the Senate may try to cling to power beyond their terms. In March 2024, Pita represented Thailand at the Inter-Parliamentary Union summit and joined the International Parliamentary Network for Education. He addressed issues such as climate change and the importance of inclusivity in societies.

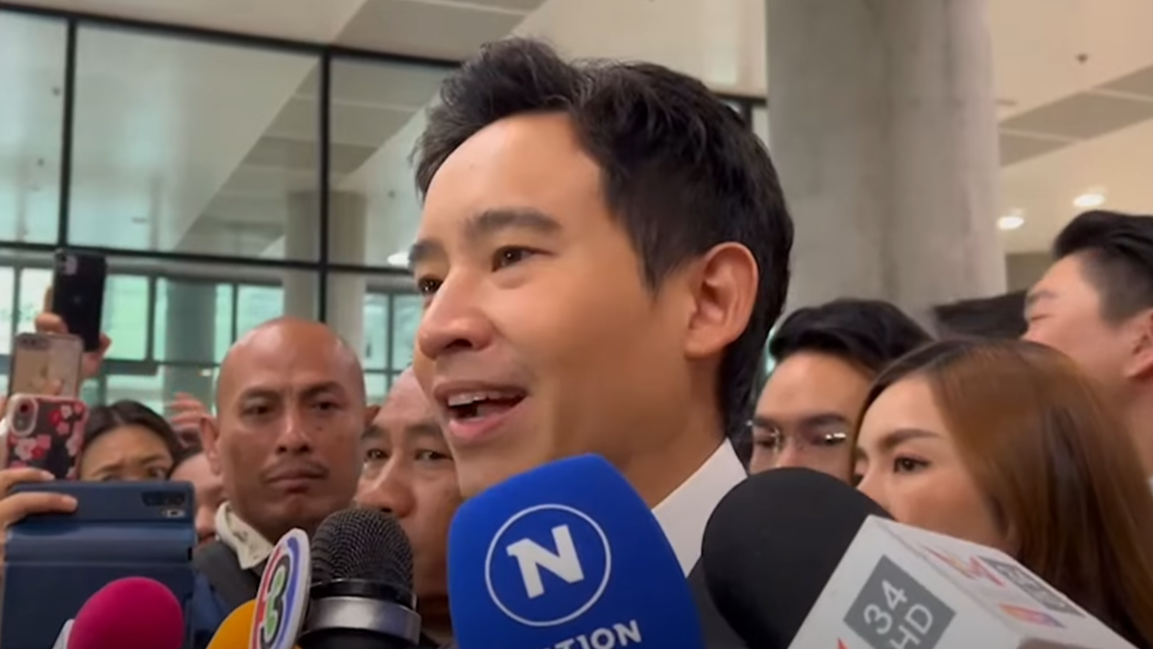
Pita meets with the press upon his return to Parliament on 25 January 2024.

On 5 February, in another separate case, Pita and seven other progressive politicians were given four-month suspended prison sentences from the Pathum Wan Municipal District Court in Bangkok, over an unlawful rally that was held in December 2019. Although their sentence was suspended for the next two years, he was ordered to pay an 11,200 baht fine. He appealed the verdict. If the appeal failed, it had the potential to disqualify him from the Parliament.

In late December, Chaithawat said he would be ready to resign as party leader were Pita to be acquitted, believing most party members would support Pita for the position at the party's upcoming general meeting in April 2024. When asked if he will return to party leadership, Pita stated it would be decided at the April meeting. After his reinstatement, he stated he was "ready, willing, and able" to lead the country as the next prime minister, if the political situation demanded it. In January, Chaithawat confirmed the party meeting would take place in late April. Although a general meeting of the party did occur on 6 April, no leadership election was held, and Chaithawat remained as opposition leader. The party continued to insist that Pita's candidacy as a nominee for prime minister remained intact. In February 2024 MFP spokesperson Parit Wacharasindhu stated Pita was still eligible for the position if he were to be acquitted on any charges he was currently facing. In May 2024, Chaithawat said the party would be ready to re-nominate Pita for the role of prime minister were Srettha Thavisin to be removed in a "political accident." During a pride parade in Bangkok in June 2024, Pita reiterated that not only was he ready to take over as prime minister were he to be nominated but the party was also ready for an election "at any time".

=== Dissolution of the Move Forward Party ===
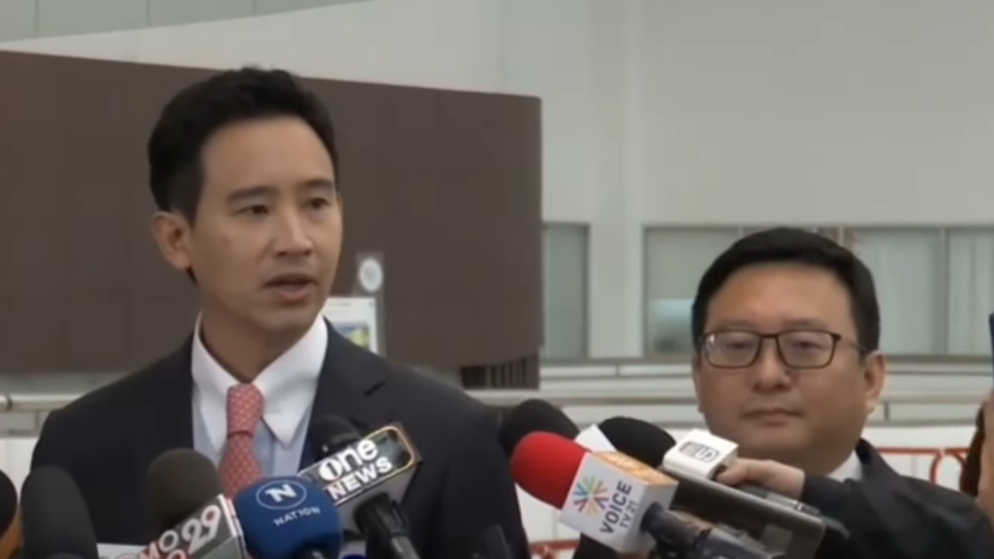
Pita with Move Forward leader Chaithawat Tulathon in December 2023.

Simultaneously, Pita and the entire Move Forward Party were involved in another court case, in which they were accused via a petition of attempting to overthrow the monarchy of Thailand. The Constitutional Court considered a petition which argued that the party's attempt to reform the lese-majeste law amounted to an attempt to overthrow the monarchy. If found guilty, the party may be dissolved, although in late December, when summoned to the court, Pita rejected that possibility. Additionally, MFP leader Chaithawat Tulathon believed that their proposal to amend Section 112 of the Criminal Code was not a breach of the law or Section 49 of the Constitution. The original petitioner stated he was attempting to block a "violation" of the royal institution, and was not intending for his case to dissolve the Move Forward party. In the days preceding the ruling, Pita reiterated the policy's legality. By December, both Pita and Chaithawat were interviewed in preparation for the court's decision. The judges met at 9:30 AM on 31 January to confer their individual decisions. Move Forward was not physically present at the court for the verdict, opting to watch from a conference room at the Parliament building; Pita and Chaithawat arrived at around 1:50 PM, and were once again swarmed by reporters. The court began reading the verdict at 2:14 PM. After 43 minutes, the court ruled that Move Forward's campaign promise to amend the lèse majesté was unlawful and tantamount to attempting to overthrow the monarchy, and ordered the party to cease related activities. All 9 justices ruled unanimously. The ruling effectively ended any national attempts to amend lèse majesté. The verdict makes it possible for the Election Commission to ask for the party's dissolution, which could also lead to Pita and other party executives being banned from politics for up to 10 years. Pita believed the case damaged free speech and the health of Thai democracy, while Chaithawat stated the ruling changed the definition of a constitutional monarchy. CNA described the ruling as a "gag order", and reported that some Move Forward MPs believed it would just be a matter of time before a petition would be filed to dissolve the party. Immediately after the verdict, the party was hit with numerous complaints seeking its dissolution under Article 92 of the Thai Constitution. On 1 February, Ruangkrai Leekitwattana, who was a former Palang Pracharath Party senator, filed a petition to the EC to dissolve the party. Ruangkrai had twice before petitioned the EC to dissolve the party and had filed the complaint against Pita for his iTV shares. In a February interview, he vowed to 'fight tooth and nail' for the party's survival. The Election Commission officially asked the Constitutional Court to disband the party on 12 March. The petition was accepted by the Constitutional Court on 3 April 2024. Human Rights Watch described the case as a "political battering ram." Pita would later describe the dissolution effort by the court as a "judicial soft-coup: and an attack on democracy.

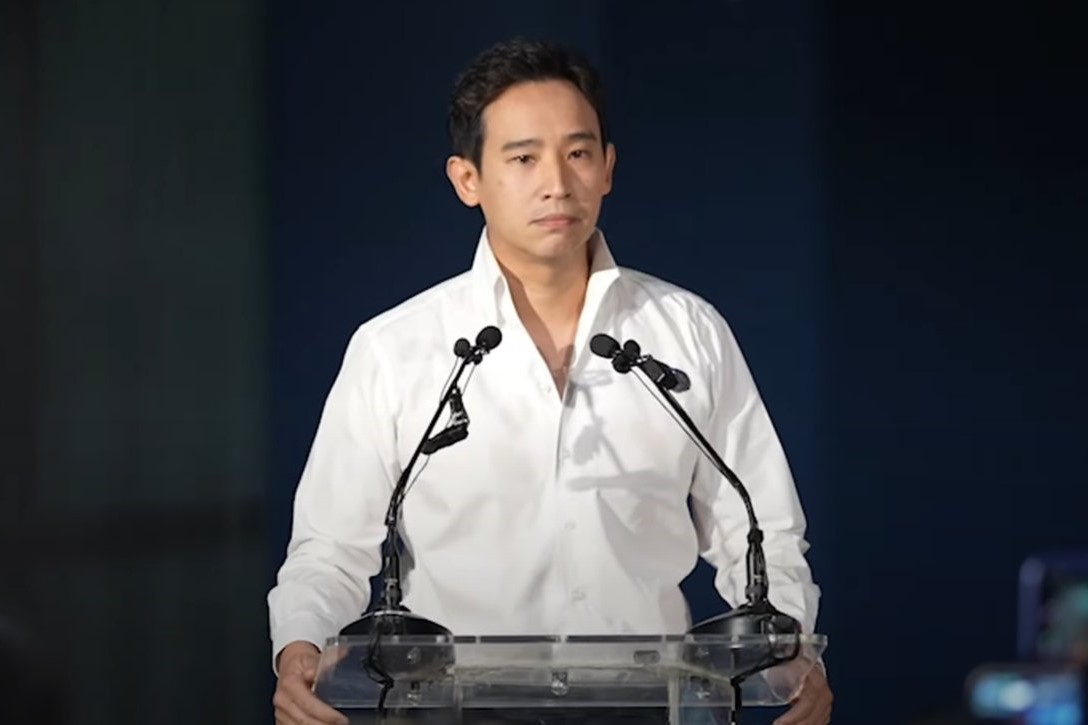
Pita outlines the party's defense against dissolution on 9 June 2024.

The party was granted various extensions to prepare their defense as the court's deliberations went well into June and July, with arguments not taking place until 2 June. In an interview with the Financial Times during a June trip to Seoul, Pita said the party was seeking "proportionality of [the] law between protection of the monarchy as well as freedom of speech". He also warned the dissolution of the party would only "turbocharge" calls for reform. Pita continued to criticize the Pheu Thai party, and believed some of their voters would be unable to trust them by the next election. On 4 June, the party submitted its rebuttal statement to the court. The Election Commission again emphasized that they were seeking a 10-year ban on all executive party members, including Pita. He accused the Court of "overreaching" and called a ban on the party a "disproportionate" response to MFP's efforts to reform royal insult laws. He warned that getting rid of the country's largest opposition party would constitute "an attack on democracy". Pita continued to lay out the party's nine-point defense plan in various press conferences, and argued the Court had no jurisdiction over party dissolutions. Like in the past Constitutional Court cases involving Pita and the party, the party dissolution verdict was continuously postponed for months. Evidence and testimony was filed with the court throughout June and July. Despite being under the threat of dissolution, Pita and the party enjoyed high popularity ratings among the public.

The irony of this whole upcoming ruling is that the Constitutional Court never had any problem whenever rogue army generals seized power and annulled one constitution after the other.

— Pravit Rojanaphruk, in an opinion for Khaosod published on 4 August 2024

In early July Pita addressed the University of Melbourne's Southeast Asia Oration. He later spoke at the Regional Conference on Climate Resilience of Southeast Asia. During that same month he accused the Constitutional Court of 'double standards'. On 17 July, the court set a date for the verdict in the dissolution case for 7 August 2024. Pita remained confident in the days and weeks leading up the verdict, believing judicial precedent would help the party's case. In an interview with Reuters on 26 July, he said the party could avoid dissolution on the basis of a technicality. He compared possibly dissolving Move Forward to effectively 'dissolving the opposition' in Thai democracy. In early August, Pita dismissed speculation that the Move Forward party had already set up a 'reserve' party, in case it were to be dissolved by the court. Despite this, key figures within the party said they had made "preparations to regroup under the banner of another party" in the case of dissolution, according to the Bangkok Post. In an interview with Bloomberg, Pita conceded that there were in fact plans to set up a new party, believing the process would be "smoother" than last time. In the same interview, he said Srettha Thavisin had "underperformed" as Prime Minister, calling the current government coalition an "unnatural alliance". He warned of instability were the verdict not to be in the party's favor, warning that Srettha's premiership and the stability of the Thai economy could be put in jeopardy. (Srettha would later be dismissed as prime minister on 14 August in a separate case overseen by the Court.) On 1 August he penned an opinion piece in The Economist in an attempt to explain his position on the case to an international audience; the following day he met with diplomats from 18 countries, including the United States, United Kingdom, Japan and the European Union. Pita predicted that were Move Forward to be dissolved following a court ruling, its successor would win in a landslide at the next elections. He also believed that there was a possibility he would become Prime Minister by 2027. In the final days before the verdict, Pita maintained his optimism and urged his supporters to not lose hope. He said that were he to be banned the party dissolved, he hoped it would be the last time such an event would occur in the history of Thai democracy. The party had invited the public to their headquarters in the Hua Mak district of Bangkok to listen to the ruling live. A dissolution was seen as likely by most political commentators. In the hours before the verdict, Pita said he was 'highly confident' of a favorable ruling for the party. He arrived at the court at 2:25 PM. The verdict reading began at 3:00 PM and on 7 August 2024, the party was dissolved and Pita, along with other senior party executives, was banned from politics for 10 years.

=== Suspension from politics ===
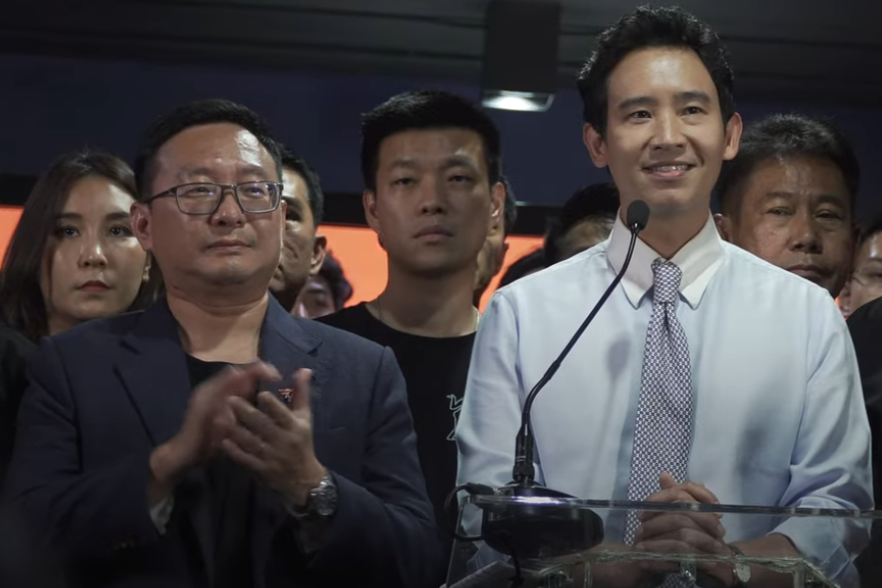
Pita speaking at his last press conference, shortly after the Move Forward Party was dissolved, on 7 August 2024

The verdict was condemned by the United States, European Union and other nations. Shortly after the verdict was delivered, Pita returned to party headquarters for a final press conference. He stated that he was proud of what the party had been able to achieve and that he "had no regrets". Pita vowed that the decision would not mean the end of his own political career, and that the party would continue under a 'new vehicle'. He also said he would continue to engage in politics as a private citizen. In a Tweet sent out the same day, Pita stated "It was the greatest honor in my life to have the opportunity to serve my country and its people as a politician. It will be a memory I will never forget. Thank you."

Before Move Forward was dissolved, Supisarn Bhakdinarinath, a deputy leader within the party, stated that a new executive board for a new party was ready to be established, potentially on the same day as the verdict, were the party to be dissolved. He named Sirikanya Tansakun, as the presumed leader of this new hypothetical party, billing her as a counterweight to Pheu Thai leader Paetongtarn Shinawatra. Sirikanya was also described as a "consensus candidate" among the party. Before the verdict was announced, Pita also threw his support behind Sirikanya, calling her "quite an accomplished economist" and a "great candidate." Parit Wacharasindhu was reported as a possible leader to succeed Pita and Chaithawat as early as April 2024, due to his speaking style and public appeal.

On 9 August, the People's Party was founded as a direct successor to the dissolved Move Forward Party. All 143 MPs who remained in the Parliament after the dissolution joined the new party, making it the largest opposition party in the House of Representatives. Pita threw his support behind the party and its new leader, Natthaphong Ruengpanyawut, who was elected unopposed.

== Post-political career ==
In an interview on 20 August 2024, Pita vowed to return to Thai politics, stating: "I am biding my time. I still want to make a difference in Thailand. I will accumulate knowledge and experience so that when I return to lead the country, I will be better than before."

Later that month, it was announced that Pita would return to Harvard Kennedy School as a visiting Democracy Fellow. He described the fellowship as an "exciting opportunity" to share his experiences in leadership, political struggles, democracy, and public policy. The program was reported to last two semesters. Pita stated that he drew inspiration from former New Zealand prime minister Jacinda Ardern in pursuing the dual fellowships, and that he would divide his time between Boston and Bangkok, where his daughter continued her schooling.

In May 2025, Pita announced the publication of his memoir, The Almost Prime Minister, recounting the events of the 2023 Thai general election and his subsequent bid to become prime minister. The book became available for pre-order on 29 May 2025 in Thai, offered in hardcover, paperback, and e-book editions.

== Political positions ==
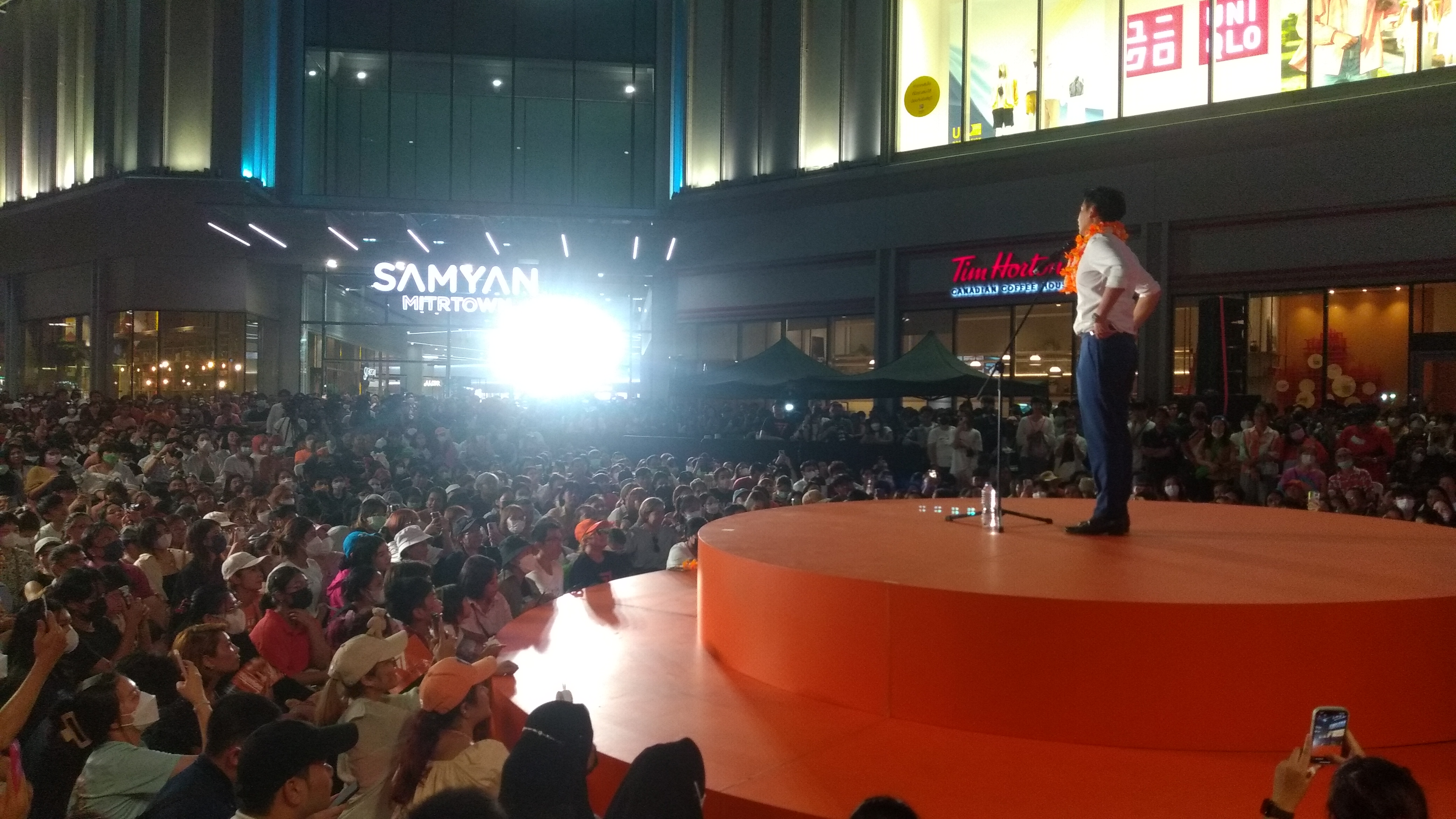
Pita giving a speech at Samyan Mitrtown in Bangkok

Pita has been described as a progressive by the standards of Thai politics. His Move Forward Party, which he led from 2020 to 2023, was referred to as center-left, reformist, pro-democratic, and progressive. He described their vision as "three Ds": demilitarise, decentralise, and demonopolise. Pita believes Thailand will break out of its "vicious cycle" of protests and coups, taking inspiration from successful democratic transformations in South Korea and Indonesia.

=== Democratic backsliding and economic issues ===
Pita has frequently referred to the years between 2014 and 2023 as "the lost decade" of Thailand, in regards to both economics and democratic backsliding. Pita believes the Thai armed services have too much influence in civilian politics, and has vowed to decrease their influence. Pita also said that Thailand must "demilitarize". Pita has promised that his party would amend the controversial Royal defamation law, which protects the Thai monarchy from public criticism. In an April 2024 interview, Pita said Pheu Thai and Move Forward were "aligned" in their goal to review and reform the country's lèse-majesté (royal insult) laws before the election, but that changed shortly before the Srettha government was sworn in. In 2024, he compared their alliance with military-backed parties as 'two tigers in a cave'. He has maintained that the Thai royal family should be above politics as "a vital institution of national unity." He has denied being in favor of republicanism, and has stated he supports constitutional monarchy as a system of government in Thailand.

On economic policy, Pita believes in the demonopolization, and decentralization of the economy. He said one of the key goals of the Move Forward Party was "to prove that the Thai economy works for the 99% and not just the top 1%". Pita thinks aspects of a welfare state are needed in Thailand, with the welfare being 'funded from demilitarization'. He has said he would liberalize Thailand's liquor industry. One of Pita's campaign promises was to increase the national pension by four times. He disagreed with the Srettha government's proposed digital wallet scheme, preferring small economic stimulus projects instead.

=== Domestic issues ===
Pita supports legislation that would regulate air quality and require companies to register chemicals transported around the country, as a means of mitigating the effects of climate change. He criticized the government's response to forest fires in Chiang Mai in March 2024.

He described the detention of former prime minister Thaksin Shinawatra as political persecution, while also believing his treatment was evidence of double standards in Thailand's justice system. In February 2024, Pita hosted a solidarity dinner on behalf of the Move Forward party with other opposition parties, including The Democrats.

He supports diverting money from the military budget to fight climate change. During a 2024 climate change summit in Malaysia, Pita accused the current government of working too slowly to fight global warming by giving a small budget to relevant agencies and setting unambitious environmental goals.

=== Social issues ===
Pita supports the legalization of same-sex marriage and has attended a pride parades in Bangkok. He supported the Thai government's same-sex marriage bill that was passed in 2024, believing it was one of the few things Move Forward and Pheu Thai agreed on. He also believes same-sex couples should have the right to raise a family and adopt children.

Pita supports voluntary conscription for military service.

When meeting with Karen people in August 2023, he said he would work on bills to promote the rights of ethnic minorities and indigenous people.

=== Foreign policy ===
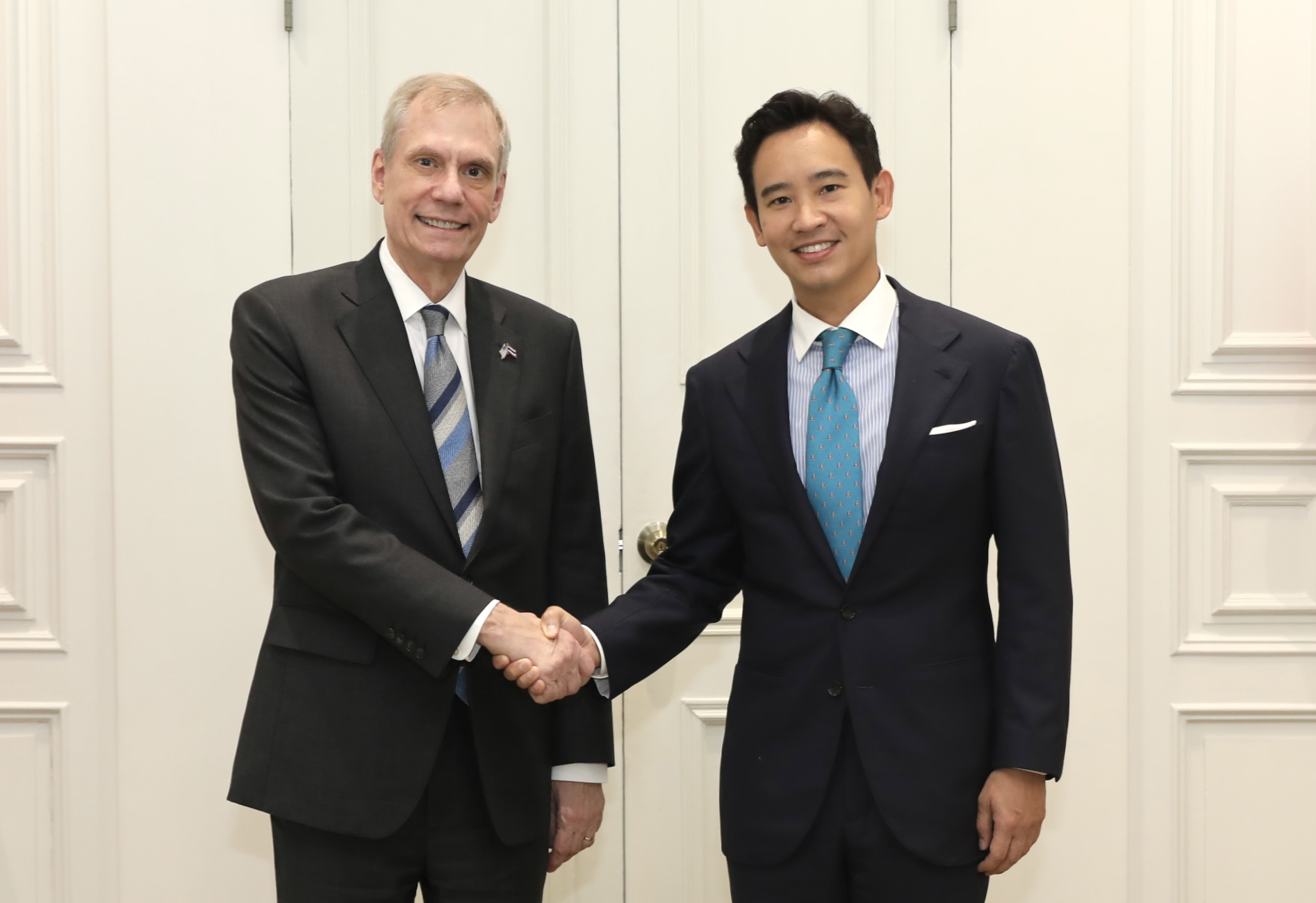
Pita meeting with U.S. Ambassador to Thailand Robert Godec in 2023.

Pita has centered his foreign policy on his "3Rs", 'Revive, Rebalance, and Recalibrate'. He also stated that Thailand should be more assertive on the global stage and open more dialogue with greater powers, and that democratic values should be the core of Thailand's foreign policy. Pita believes in "rules based world order" when approaching diplomacy, and said the 2014 coup may have isolated Thailand's Western allies, such as the United States. He believes Thailand has the potential to be "the undisputed leader in the democratic force in [Asia]". Pita said that "the promotion of fundamental rights will be the guiding star of Thai foreign policy" were he to become prime minister. He believes Thailand should ratify the Rome Statue, which would make it a member party of the International Criminal Court (ICC).

Celebrating the 190 anniversary of Thailand–United States relations, Pita stated he "trusts the US–Thai alliance". He supports expanding the U.S.-Thai alliance beyond defense to include the environment, trade, infrastructure and the digital economy. Pita condemned the Russian invasion of Ukraine calling the Thai government's response "two-faced". He encouraged Russia to "withdraw its forces immediately" from Ukraine. Pita advised the Prayut government to stop purchasing Chinese vaccines during the COVID-19 pandemic. He celebrated Taiwan's National Day at the Taipei Economic and Cultural Office in October 2023, despite the lack of government representatives.

Pita supports Thailand being more involved in ASEAN. In June 2023, Pita said he would support and help organize ASEAN-led peace efforts in Myanmar, amidst a humanitarian crisis that has been ongoing since the country entered a civil war in 2021. He also criticized the Thai government at the time for being too "accommodating" to the Myanmar junta. During the 2023 election campaign, Pita promised to establish a humanitarian corridor between Thailand and Myanmar to accommodate refugees.

=== Political inspirations ===
In an interview with CNA, Pita said he was inspired by Singaporean prime minister Lee Kuan Yew, and has compared politics to a marathon rather than a sprint, saying "I have the stamina to run for a long time." He has also cited U.S. Senator Bernie Sanders as another one of his political role models and owns a copy of the Senator's book "It's OK to Be Angry About Capitalism." He also included Uruguayan President José Mujica as one of his political inspirations. In a June 2024 interview with the Melbourne Asia Review, Pita stated "My favorite leader in the world who I look up to is Jacinda Ardern," the Prime Minister of New Zealand from 2017 to 2023.

== Personal life ==
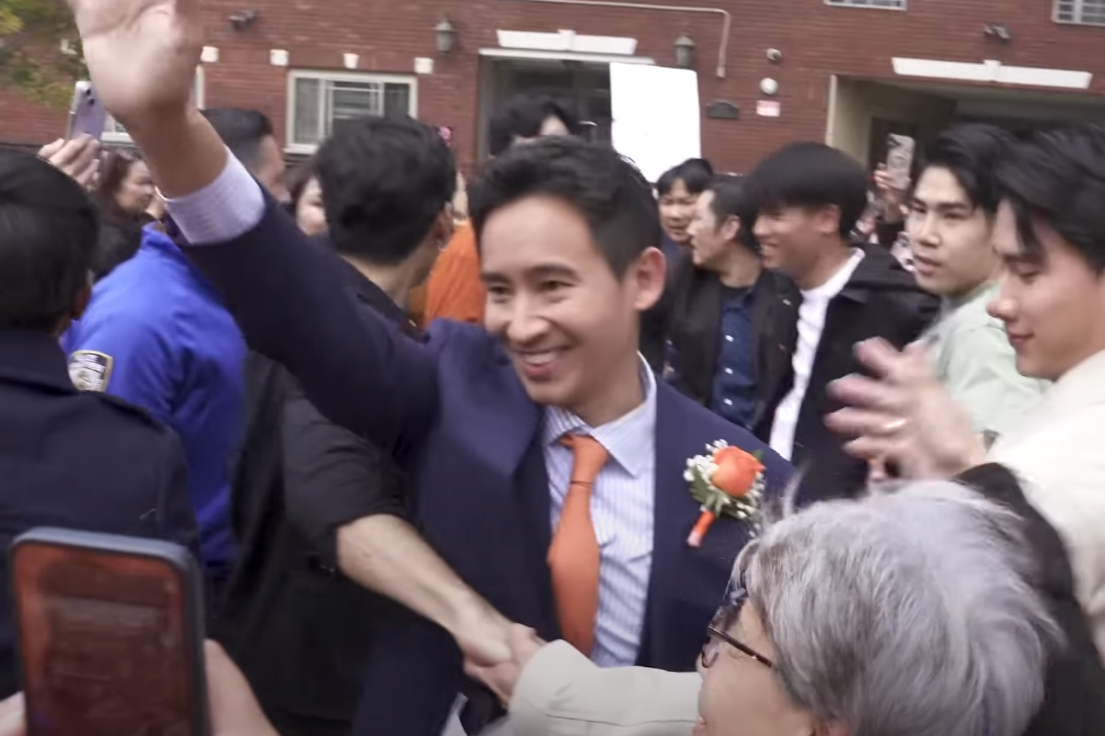
Pita with supporters in the United States, October 2023.

Pita married actress Chutima Teepanart on 12 December 2012. The couple divorced in March 2019. Chutima publicly alleged that Pita had been controlling and abusing her during their marriage. Women's rights and pro-democracy activists called for Pita to respond to the allegations. Chutima filed a lawsuit against Pita alleging bodily abuse, but it was dismissed as false by the family court. Afterwards, she said, "Violence may not have been an issue, but he did harm me psychologically." She has since downplayed the allegations and expressed support for his political ambitions. They have one daughter, Pipim.

Pita has epilepsy, first discovering he had it when he was living in Boston during his years at Harvard. He says he uses recreational marijuana to help treat the disorder.

Pita has been described as "charismatic", and is known for his optimism. In 2024, The Washington Post referred to Pita as "arguably Thailand's most popular politician". He enjoys rock music, particularly bands such as Coldplay, Metallica, and Radiohead among others. In December 2023, it was reported that Pita had inadvertently leaked the tracklist of the debut album of K-pop group Babymonster, when he posted photos from inside YG Entertainment studios on Instagram during a trip to South Korea. He later deleted the photo.

In addition to his native Thai, Pita speaks English.

=== Public image ===
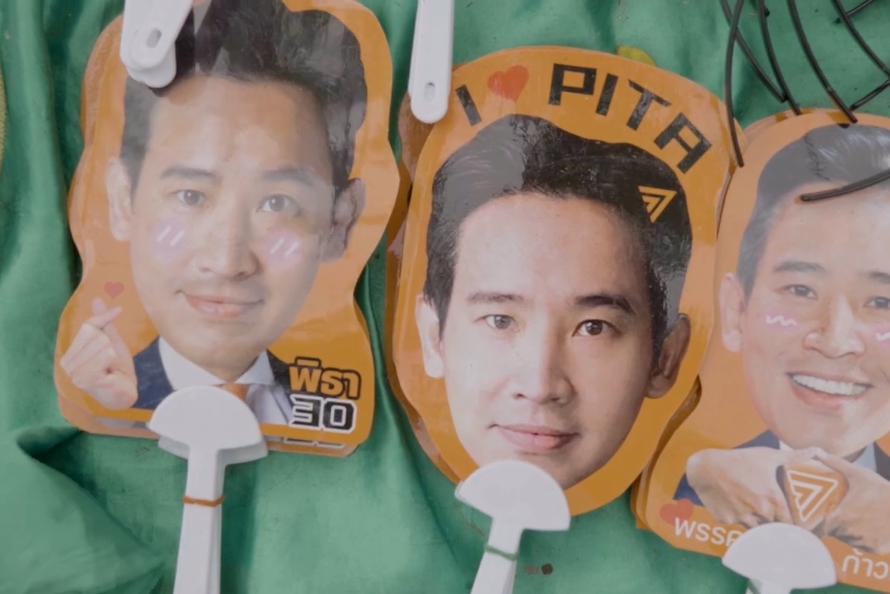
Memorabilia of Pita, pictured in May 2023.

In 2008, he was named as one of CLEO Thailand's "50 Most Eligible Bachelors".

In the aftermath of the 2023 Thai general elections, Pita was named as "TIME100 NEXT" by Time magazine. He was the only Thai who had been selected on the list in 2023. He attended the TIME 100 Next gala night in New York on 24 October 2023.

According to results from a National Institute of Development Administration (NIDA) poll survey, published at the end of 2023, Pita remained the most popular politician in Thailand, trumping Srettha Thavisin as the preferred prime minister. The poll showed 40% of respondents prefer Pita as PM, compared to Srettha's 22% support. Poll respondents stated he possesses good leadership qualities, is accessible to the new generation, and has a good personality. Additionally, Move Forward remained the most popular party in Thailand, with opinion souring on Pheu Thai after their collaboration with military-aligned parties in the parliament. Another poll released in March 2024 showed 46.79% of respondents believed Pita was the politician most 'deserving of people's sympathy'. An April 2024 poll showed Move Forward leading Pheu Thai in popularity. Pita and the party continued to perform well in polls released in May 2024. During deliberations for Move Forward's dissolution case, Pita continued to attract large crowds to his speeches. A June 2024 poll showed 46% favored Pita to be prime minister.

== Bibliography ==
- Limjaroenrat, Pita (2025). The Almost Prime Minister (in Thai). Avocado Books.. Translated to English by Penguin Random House SEA in September 2026.

== Notes ==
Party political offices
Preceded by Thanathorn Juangroongruangkit as Leader of the Future Forward Party	Leader of the Move Forward Party; 2020–2023	Succeeded by Chaithawat Tulathon
Preceded by Peemai Ratthawongsa acting; de jure	Leader of the Move Forward Party; 2020–2023	Succeeded by Chaithawat Tulathon
