= Chaithawat Tulathon =

Thai politician (born 1978)

- ชัยธวัช ตุลาธน
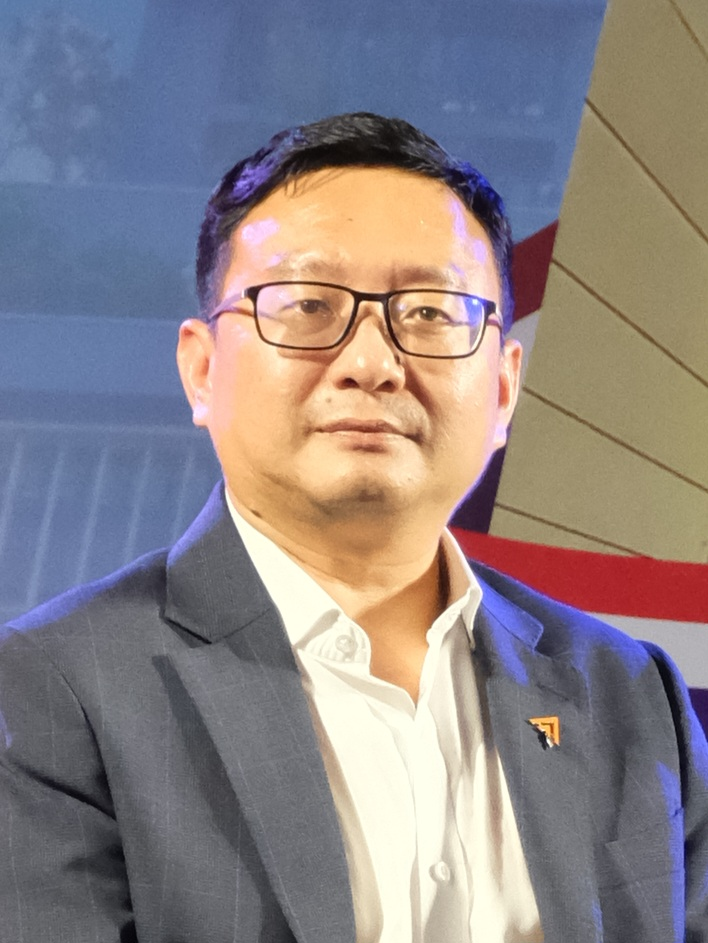
- Chaithawat in 2023

Leader of the Opposition
- In office 17 December 2023 – 7 August 2024
- Monarch: Vajiralongkorn
- Prime Minister: Srettha Thavisin
- Preceded by: Cholnan Srikaew
- Succeeded by: Natthaphong Ruengpanyawut

Leader of the Move Forward Party
- In office 23 September 2023 – 7 August 2024
- Preceded by: Pita Limjaroenrat
- Succeeded by: Natthaphong Ruengpanyawut (People's Party; de facto)

Secretary-General of the Move Forward Party
- In office 14 March 2020 – 23 September 2023
- Leader: Pita Limjaroenrat
- Preceded by: Peemai Ratthawongsa (de jure); Piyabutr Saengkanokkul (Future Forward Party; de facto)
- Succeeded by: Apichat Sirisunthon

Member of the House of Representatives
- In office 14 May 2023 – 7 August 2024
- Constituency: Party-list

Personal details
- Born: Chaithawat Sae-Kou; 15 October 1978 (age 48) Songkhla, Thailand
- Party: People's (2024–present)
- Other political affiliations: Future Forward (2018–2020); Move Forward (2020–2024)
- Education: Chulalongkorn University (BEng)
- Occupation: Politician; engineer
- Website: Campaign website
- Nickname: Tom (ต๋อม)

Chaithawat Tulathon (Thai: ชัยธวัช ตุลาธน; born Chaithawat Sae-Kou, ชัยธวัช แซ่โค้ว, 15 October 1978) is a Thai former politician who served as Leader of the Opposition and Leader of the Move Forward Party from 2023 to 2024. A former member of the House of Representatives, he previously served as the party's secretary-general from 2020 to 2023.

Born in Songkhla Province, Chaithawat was educated as an engineer before entering journalism as the founder of Same Sky Books, a political magazine. An ally of Thanathorn Juangroongruangkit, Chaithwat supported the pro-democracy Future Forward Party. After the party was dissolved, he was asked to join the newly created Move Forward Party (MFP) by party leader Pita Limjaroenrat. Chaithawat accepted, serving as the party's Secretary-General. In the 2023 general election, MFP won the largest number of seats; Chaithawat himself won a seat in the House of Representatives as a party-list candidate.

Subsequently, the MFP attempted to form a government coalition with fellow pro-democracy parties. After Pita's election as Prime Minister was blocked by the Senate, the Pheu Thai party formed a new coalition that excluded MFP. Chaithwat was later elected as party leader unopposed after Pita was suspended from the National Assembly due to a Constitutional Court order in September. Later in January 2024, the party's attempts at reforming Thailand's lèse-majesté laws was found to be unconstitutional by the same court. On 7 August 2024, Chaithawat was banned from politics along with other senior party members for 10 years after a verdict from the Constitutional Court that simultaneously dissolved the Move Forward Party. He has since supported the party's successor, the People's Party.

Chaithawat is considered a progressive.

== Early life and education ==
Chaithawat was born on 15 October 1978, in Songkhla, Thailand. He studied at Hatyaiwittayalai School and Triam Udom Suksa School, the latter of which he was classmates with Thanathorn Juangroongruangkit.

Chaithawat studied Bachelor of Engineering Program in Environmental Engineering at Chulalongkorn University and was leader of the Student Federation of Thailand from 1998 to 1999. In 2002 Chaithawat founded the Same Sky Books political magazine and served as its editor until 2018.

== Political career ==
=== MFP Secretary-General (2020–2023) ===
Fourteen days after the formation of the Move Forward Party, formed after the Future Forward Party was dissolved by a Constitutional Court order, Chaithawat was selected to be the party's Secretary General on 14 March 2020. On the same day, Pita Limjaroenrat was elected party leader.

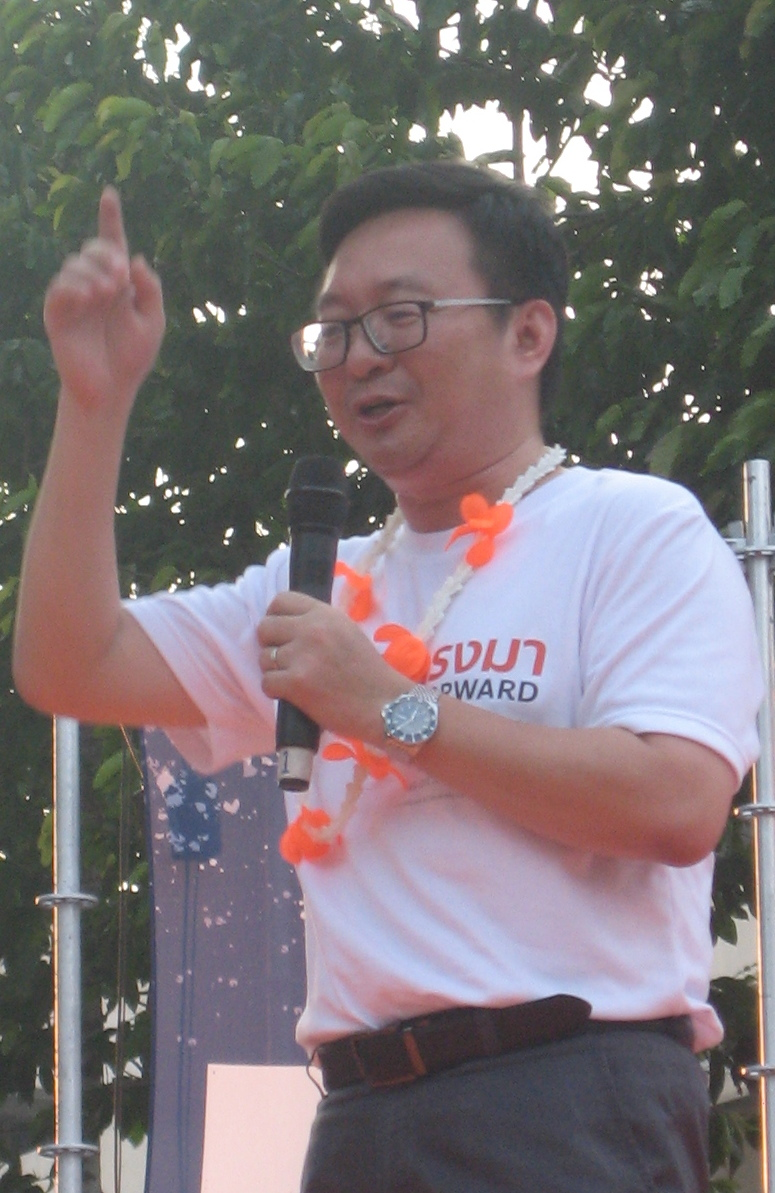
Chaitawat speaking at a campaign event in April 2023.

Chaithawat Tulathon contested in the 2023 general election as a party-list candidate for the Move Forward Party. He was listed second under party leader Pita Limjaroenrat on party list ballots. Chaithawat confirmed in early May that Pita would be the party's only prime ministerial nominee, and that the party would field candidates in all 400 constituencies. Under Pita and Chaithawat, the Move Forward Party won the most seats (153) in the election, and amassed about 38% of the popular vote.

Chaithwat helped negotiate a government formation with fellow pro-democracy parties in the days after the election. Representing Move Forward, he and Pita successfully negotiated a coalition government agreement with various parties, including the populist Phue Thai Party, which had come second in the election in what was widely described as an upset. A memorandum of understanding, a first in the history of Thai politics, was signed by all cooperating parties, which included, among other things, the nomination of Pita as prime minister upon the meeting of the National Assembly in July. Chaithawat and the party faced many hurdles upon the coalition announcement however. The Thai Senate, composed of members appointed by the military after the 2014 coup, maintained voting power in the election of the prime minister. The party was also under small threats of dissolution due to its proposed lèse-majesté (royal insult law) reforms. Party leader Pita was also under consideration for suspension by Thailand's Constitutional Court, after the Election Commission alleged he had violated election law. Nevertheless, Chaithwat and party leaders projected confidence going into the premiership election in the National Assembly.

On 13 July, the National Assembly convened to elect a new Prime Minister. Pita was nominated by the Pheu Thai party. Despite securing a majority-coalition in the lower house, Pita did not obtain enough votes in the first ballot, particularly from the 250 members of the Senate. After Pita fell 51 votes short of a majority, protests occurred in the evening following the vote. Despite this, the party refused to back down on their election promise to reform the lèse-majesté law, which was a perceived issue for some Senators. The Assembly met again on 19 July. During the meeting, the National Assembly voted against considering Pita for another round of voting for Prime Minister, citing a recent ruling by the Constitutional Court.

=== MFP leadership and Leader of the Opposition (2023–2024) ===
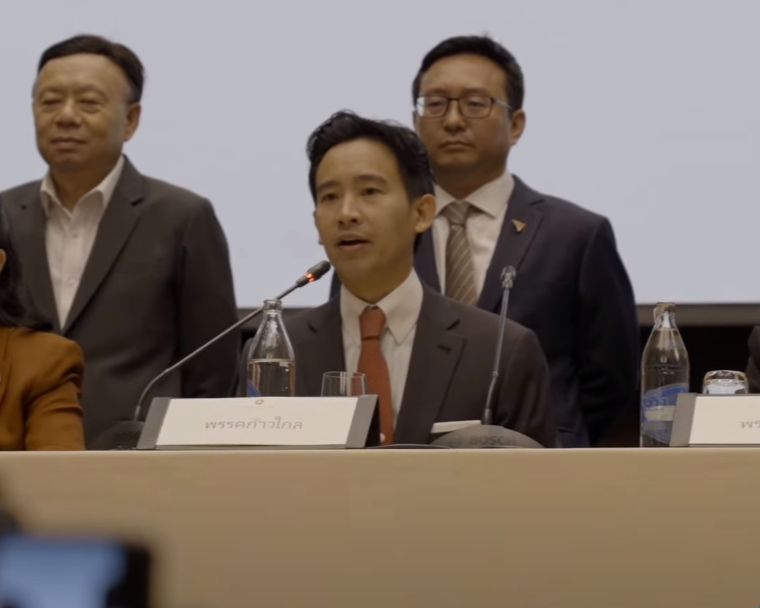
Chaithawat stands behind MFP Leader Pita Limjareonrat during a press conference in May 2023.

With Move Forward no longer part of the post-election coalition, Pheu Thai assumed responsibility over the government formation, nominating Srettha Thavisin, a real estate tycoon, as their candidate for prime minister. The new coalition expanded to involve more conservative parties, such as Bhumjaithai, and parties that supported the military junta, such as United Thai Nation and Palang Pracharat. On the condition that the new government would not support lèse-majesté reforms (a campaign pledge the two parties shared), Srettha received the support of the un-elected Senate and was elected prime minister on 22 August 2023. Chaithawat instructed all present MFP House Members to vote against Srettha's election. Out of government, Move Forward joined the opposition. The party won the by-election in Constituency 3 of Rayong Province in September.

On 15 September, Pita announced he would resign as party leader amidst his ongoing legal issues over his alleged campaign law violations. Chaithwat was elected by acclamation to succeed Pita on 23 September. Chaithwat became leader with Pita's full support. Pita being unable to perform his parliamentary duties, was succeeded by Chaithawat so that he could exonerate himself. Chaithawat stated his leadership was a "temporary restructure", and said he would be willing to step down once Pita was presumably acquitted by the Constitutional Court. Having won the most seats in the election, Move Forward maintained the most seats out of all parties in the opposition. Chaithawat officially became the Leader of the Opposition on 17 December 2023.

Chaithawat oversaw the party's response to an internal sexual assault scandal, expelling Wuttiphong Thonglour and Chaiyamparwaan Manpianjit from party membership. In late December, Chaithawat stated he enjoyed his work as Oppsoiton Leader, but reiterated he would be willing to step aside were Pita to be acquitted in his iTV Constitutional Court case. He also said he believed most party members would support Pita for a return to leadership at the party's upcoming general meeting in April 2024.

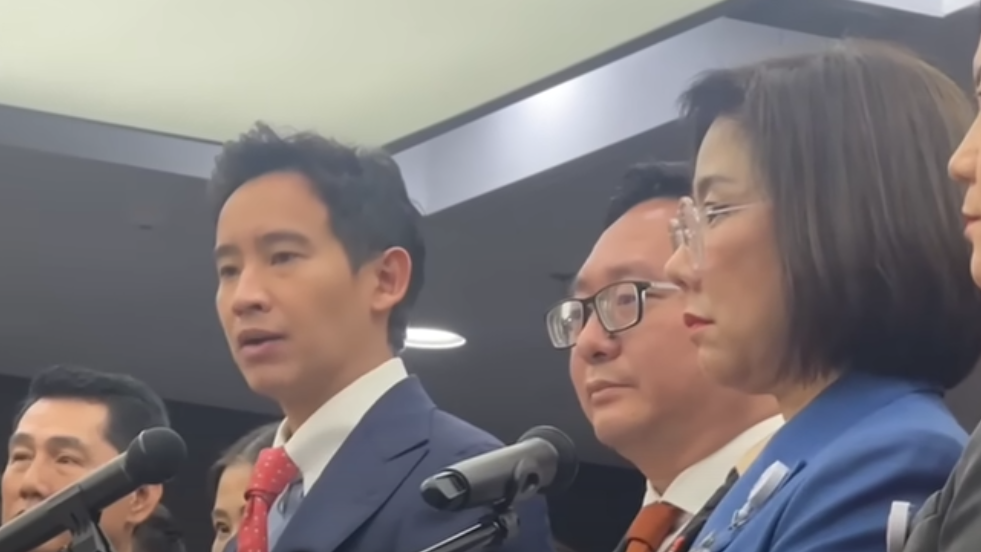
Chaithawat (centre) with Pita after a verdict from the Constitutional Court regarding lèse-majesté, 31 January 2024.

On the day of the verdict for Pita's iTV case, Chaithawat accompanied Pita to the court on 24 January 2024. The Court ultimately cleared Pita of any wrongdoing, allowing him to return to Parliament. In January, Chaithawat confirmed that a general meeting of the party would take place in late April. Although a general meeting of the party did occur on 6 April, no leadership election was held, and Chaithawat remained as opposition leader. Chaithawat continued work in the National Assembly amidst the party's legal troubles. He led efforts to censure the government over its failure to fulfill promises made during the 2023 campaign. He accused the government of undermining the justice system through double-standards and ignoring its policy statement presented to parliament. Chaithawat said that Prime Minister Srettha lacked leadership, and questioned if he really maintained control over the government. In May 2024, Chaithwat said the party would be ready to re-nominate Pita for the role of Prime Minister were Srettha Thavisin to be removed in a "political accident". He also ruled out any future collaborations between Move Forward and Pheu Thai, describing the two parties 'political rivals'.

==== Dissolution of the Move Forward Party ====
Meanwhile, the party was preparing for a separate Constitutional Court case, in which they were accused of attempting to overthrow the monarchy of Thailand through their promises to amend lèse-majesté laws. Chaithawat believed that the proposal to amend Section 112 of the Criminal Code was not a breach of the law or Section 49 of the Constitution. By December 2023, both Chaithawat and Pita were interviewed in preparation for the court's decision. The court met on 31 January 2024; Move Forward was not physically present at the court for the verdict, instead watching from a conference room at the Parliament building. Pita and Chaithawat arrived at around 1:50 PM, and were once again swarmed by reporters. At 2:57 PM, the court ruled that Move Forward's campaign promise to amend the lèse majesté was unlawful and tantamount to attempting to overthrow the monarchy, and ordered the party to cease related activities. The ruling effectively ended any national attempts to amend lèse majesté; Chaithawat later stated the ruling effectively changed the definition of a constitutional monarchy. The verdict made it possible for the Election Commission to ask for the party's dissolution, which could also lead to Chaithawat and other party executives being banned from politics for up to 10 years.

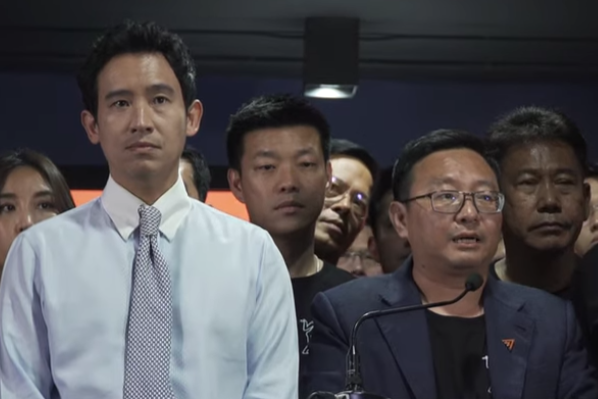
Chaithawat (right) speaks at the last press conference of the Move Forward Party on 7 August 2024.

After petitioners asked the EC for Move Forward's dissolution in February, the Commission officially asked the Constitutional Court to disband the party on 12 March. In May, Chaithawat stated that an alternative party was ready to accept Move Forward's 151 members of parliament, should the court order its dissolution. The Court granted the party various extensions to prepare their defence as the court's deliberations went well into June and July, with arguments not taking place until 2 June. On 4 June, the party submitted its rebuttal statement, written by Chaithawat, to the court. The Election Commission again emphasised that they were seeking a 10-year ban on all executive party members, including Chaithawat. Despite being under the threat of dissolution, the party enjoyed high popularity ratings among the public. On 17 July, the court set a date for the verdict in the dissolution case for 7 August 2024. The day earlier at a press conference, Chaithawat stated he objected to the evidence used by the court, and said that party members hadn't yet prepared a "backup party", believing the Move Forward party would not be dissolved. Later in August, he argued that the Court had no authority over party dissolutions, as such powers were not stipulated in the 2019 Constitution.

The party had invited the public to their headquarters in the Hua Mak district of Bangkok to listen to the ruling live. A dissolution was seen as likely by most political commentators. In the hours before the verdict, Pita said he was 'highly confident' of a favourable ruling for the party. The verdict reading began at 3:00 PM and on 7 August 2024, the party was dissolved and Chaithawat, along with other senior party executives, was banned from politics for 10 years. After the verdict, Chaithawat spoke at a final press conference at party headquarters; he acknowledged the court's decision but maintained his and the party's innocence. He stated that: "The ruling sets a dangerous precedent for the interpretation of the Constitution and laws, posing a risk to the core principles and fundamental values of our future democratic system with the King as head of state...The long-term implications may transform our democratic system into another form." That evening, Chaithawat returned to Parliament to inform the House that he and 4 other MPs could no longer perform their duties as they had been banned from political activities in the country.

=== Post-political career ===
On 9 August, the People's Party of Thailand was founded as a direct successor to the dissolved MFP. All 143 MPs who remained in the Parliament after the dissolution joined the new party, making it the largest opposition party in the House of Representatives. Natthaphong Ruengpanyawut was elected leader of the new party unopposed.

In December 2024, he visited Sweden for a meeting with the Swedish Social Democrats.

Since his suspension, Chaithawat has supported the People's Party. Despite being banned from holding office, he has campaigned for the party in local elections.

== Political positions ==
Chaithawat's Move Forward Party is considered as a progressive and centre-left political party. He and the party are known for a 'pro-democracy' platform and their goal of removing the influence of the military in civilian politics. He has been described as a 'master strategist' regarding politics and elections.

He is a proponent of amending Thailand's strict lèse-majesté laws.

Chaithawat believes that the digital wallet scheme implemented by the Srettha government could hurt the Thai economy by increasing public borrowing.

== See also ==
- Move Forward Party
- 2023 Thai general election

Political offices
Preceded by Cholnan Srikaew	Leader of the Opposition; 2023–2024	Succeeded by Natthaphong Ruengpanyawut
Party political offices
Preceded by Pita Limjaroenrat	Leader of the Move Forward Party; 2023–2024	Succeeded by Natthaphong Ruengpanyawut as Leader of the People's Party
Preceded by Piyabutr Saengkanokkul de facto from Future Forward	Secretary-General of the Move Forward Party; 2020–2023	Succeeded by Apichat Sirisunthon
Preceded by Peemai Ratthawongsa de jure	Secretary-General of the Move Forward Party; 2020–2023	Succeeded by Apichat Sirisunthon
