= Theerayuth Suwankaesorn =

Thai activist lawyer

Theerayuth Suwankaesorn (Thai: ธีรยุทธ สุวรรณเกษร) (Note: Other spellings include Theerayut Suwannakasorn) is a Thai activist lawyer, known for his petitions to the Constitutional Court of Thailand and the Election Commission of Thailand.

== Early life and education ==
He received a Bachelor of Laws from Ramkhamhaeng University.

== Career ==
Teerayuth previously served as an executive member of the People Reform Party, founded by Paiboon Nititawan in 2018, until the Party's dissolution a year later.

Teerayuth served as a lawyer for Phra Buddha Issara, an activist monk involved in the legal case against Wat Phra Dhammakaya's abbot Luang Por Dhammajayo.

=== Independent lawyer ===
Theerayuth's petitions have included a 22 May 2023 complaint against the Move Forward Party made to the Election Commission, alleging the party's advocacy of reforming Thailand's lése majestè laws undermined the country's monarchy. The petition led to the dissolution of the party on 7 August 2024 in a resolution by the Constitutional Court.

In November 2024, he launched a petition against former Prime Minister of Thailand Thaksin Shinawatra and the Pheu Thai Party, alleging they had attempted to overthrow Thailand's monarch. The petition was rejected by the Court on 22 November 2024.
