= Chaiyamparwaan Manpianjit =

Thai politician

Chaiyamparwaan Manpianjit is a Thai member of parliament representing Bangkok for the Thai Progress Party. Chaiyamparwaan was a member of the Move Forward Party in 2023.
