= 2020 Move Forward Party leadership election =

- 14 March 2020
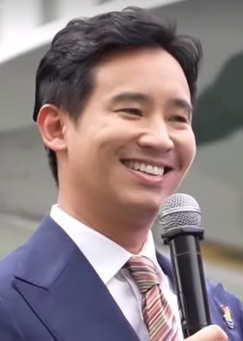
Candidate	Pita Limjaroenrat
Popular vote	Unopposed
Leader before election
Office established
Elected Leader
Pita Limjaroenrat

The 2020 Move Forward Party leadership election was held on 14 March 2020 to determine the first leader of the Move Forward Party (MFP). Pita Limjaroenrat, a member of the dissolved Future Forward Party who had served as a party-list Member of the House of Representatives since 2019, was elected unopposed one month after the Future Forward Party was dissolved.

== Background ==
The pro-democracy Future Forward Party, which had come in third place in the 2019 general election with 81 seats, was dissolved by order of the Constitutional Court on 21 February 2020. The Court stated that the reasoning for the dissolution was over alleged violations of political fundraising laws. The dissolution drew criticism from commentators in and outside Thailand, who characterized it as part of the military's continued interference in Thai politics, noting that the party's vocal anti-military position made it a target and that the other parties' finances were not similarly scrutinized.

Future Forward Leader Thanathorn Juangroongruangkit and other party executives were given a 10-year ban from political activities in Thailand. After this, 55 of the defunct Future Forward Party's 65 Members of the House of Representatives joined the Move Forward Party, which had been founded in 2014. Move Forward thus acted as the de facto successor to Future Forward. The pro-democracy and progressive ideology of the Move Forward Party mirrored that of Future Forward.

== Candidates ==
=== Designated leader ===
Candidate	Positions	Announced
Pita Limjaroenrat	Member of the House of Representatives (2019–present) Businessman (2005–2019)	21 February 2020

=== Declined ===
- Chaithawat Tulathon, Member of the House of Representatives (2019–present) (endorsed Pita)

== Process ==
Pita Limjaroenrat, an MP elected in 2019, was designated as the leader of the remaining Future Forward party MPs in February 2020. Educated in the United States and New Zealand, Pita was originally a businessman who joined Future Forward as a party-list MP in the 2019 election. He had already gained some prominence for his "Five-Button Theory,” which advocated for focus on key agricultural policies, including land ownership, farmers' debts, cannabis, agro-tourism, and water resources.

On 8 March 2020, he announced that he and the other 55 MPs would join the Move Forward Party. Pita vowed that as party leader, he would continue the progressive and anti-junta agenda begun by Future Forward.

== Results ==
As Pita was the only candidate put forward for party leadership, he was unanimously elected Leader of the Move Forward Party on 14 March 2020 during an extraordinary meeting of the party. He took office as leader that same day, reiterating his calls to keep the ideology of Future Forward alive in the new party. Pita also said he would focus on a “collective strategy” that would prioritize synergism among party members. Chaithawat Tulathon, another party-list MP was chosen as the party's Secretary-General on the same day.

Candidate	Party	Votes	%
Pita Limjaroenrat	Move Forward Party	56	100.00
Total		56	100.00

Pita would later describe himself as the “designated survivor” to lead the new party. Move Forward confirmed in October 2021 that he would be the party's nominee for Prime Minister after the next general election.

== See also ==
- 2023 Thai general election
- Future Forward Party
- Move Forward Party
- Pita Limjaroenrat
