= Same Sky Books =

Same Sky
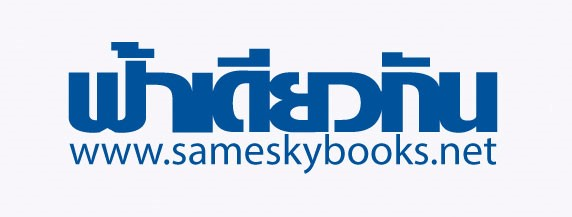
- Editor: Thanapol Eawsakul
- Categories: politics, history
- Frequency: quarterly
- Publisher: Same Sky Books
- First issue: 2003
- Final issue: 2022
- Country: Thailand
- Language: Thai
- Website: sameskybooks.net
- ISSN: 1685-6880

Same Sky Books (Thai: สำนักพิมพ์ฟ้าเดียวกัน; RTGS: samnakphim fa deaw kan) is a Thai language publishing house focusing on political activism and criticism of politics and society of Thailand. It published Same Sky (Thai: ฟ้าเดียวกัน; RTGS: fa deaw kan), a quarterly journal from 2003 to 2022, in addition to other books and articles.

The quarterly journal has ceased publishing in May 2022 due to article shortages with the 56th issue being the final edition. The publishing house stated that only the periodical has terminated, whist other non-periodical new covers will continue to be released.

The publishing house was accused of Lèse-majesté leading to its website being inaccessible in 2008. The Ministry of Information and Communication Technology declined involvement. The ministry, however, stated that the site had been under a close watch due to "violent" contents that were in contrary to the national atmosphere filled with mourn of Galyani Vadhana's recent death.

== Censorship ==
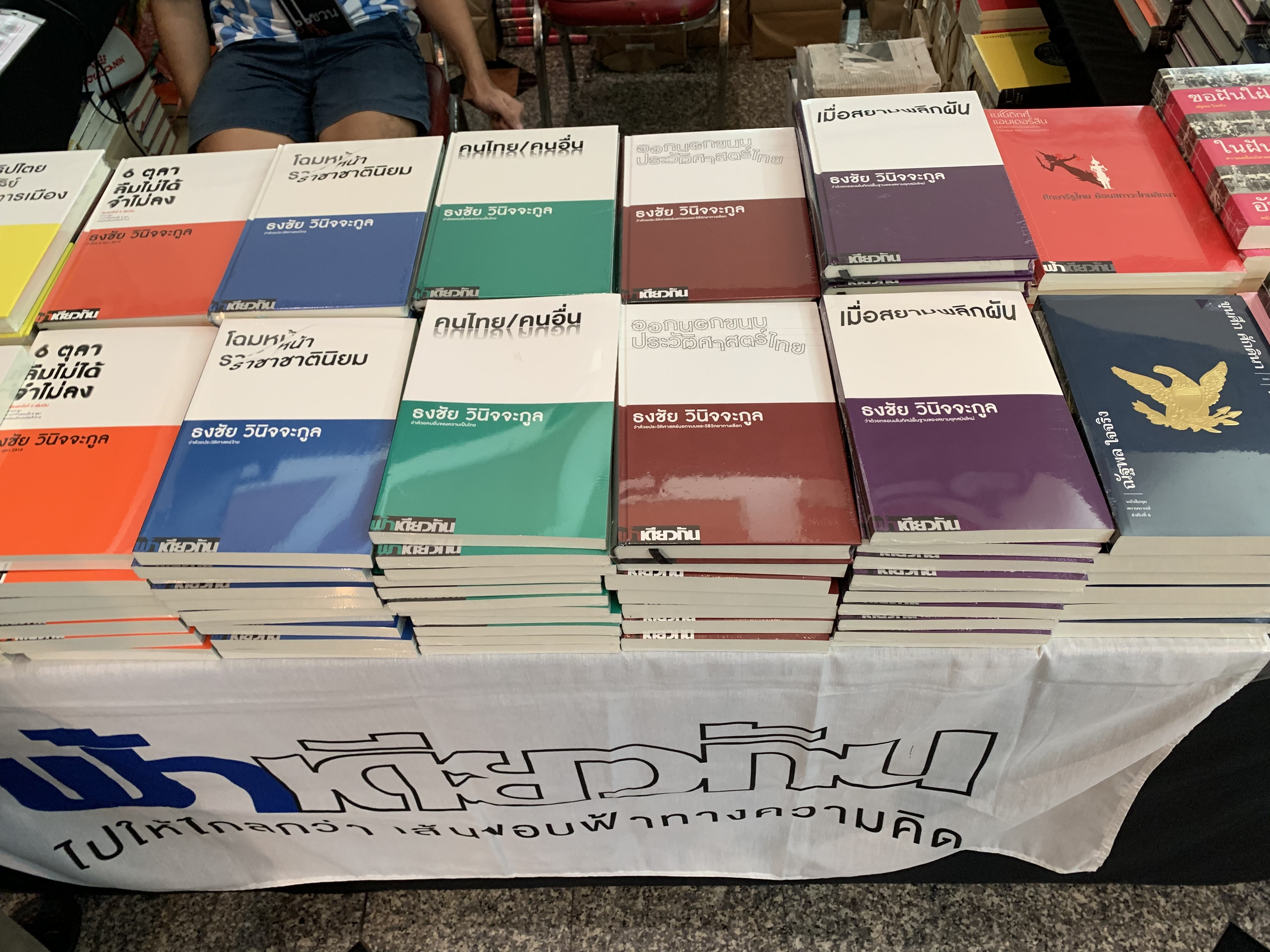
Books by Same Sky Books at an event in Thammasat University

In 2006, the journal's "Monarchy and Thai Society" edition (or commonly known as the "Coke cover") was banned and seized following an order from then police general Kowit Wattana. This was due to its content being "contrary to public order or good morals of Thai citizens." The authority never stated which article in specific violated the law.

The publishing house appealed to the court claiming its freedom of speech being protected under the constitution. It later defied the order by publishing other 6,000 copies. Editor and owner Thanapol Eawsakul was accused of Lèse-majesté by a police station on 1 April 2006. Thanapol told Prachatai that the police did not provide any information on which specific part of the issue was problematic.

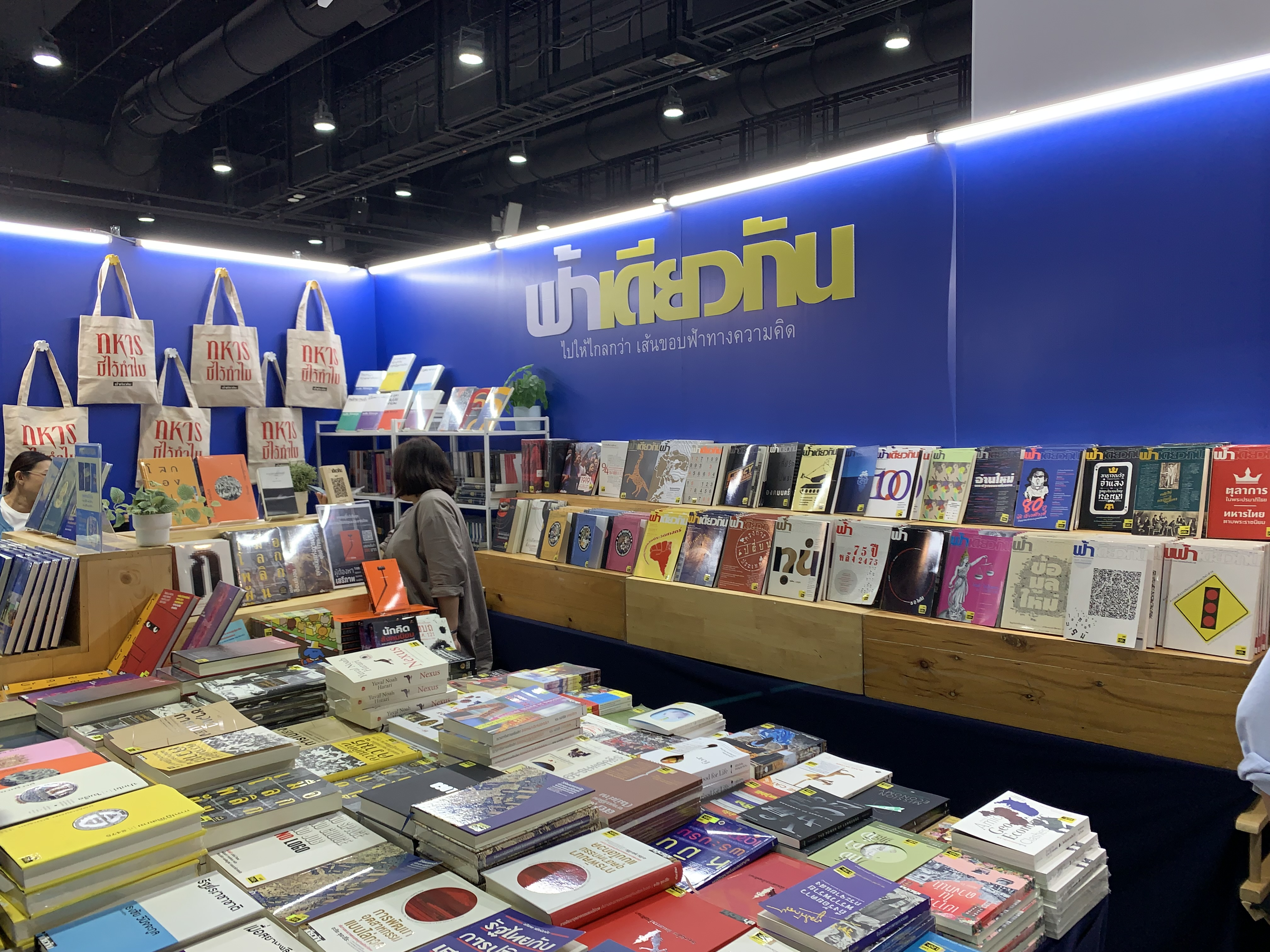
Same Sky Books' booth at Book Expo Thailand 2024 held at QSNCC

The publishing house was visited and some copies were seized by police officers in October 2020 following the widespread protests.

In January 2022, the publication house received a search warrant by the police. The owner and chief editor Thanapol Eawsakul also had his computer and mobile devices seized following the search. In late June 2022, Thanapol was arrested by Technology Crime Suppression Division police for "possessing a confidential document of the government; which poses a threat to the national security". A few hours later on the same day, he was bailed out by MP Rangsiman Rome using Rangsiman's political position. Thanapol stated that he had no idea what "national security-threatening confidential documents" he has possessed.
