= Move Forward Party =

2014–2024 political party in Thailand

Move Forward Party พรรคก้าวไกล
- Abbreviation: MFP
- Leader: Pita Limjaroenrat (2020–2023); Chaithawat Tulathon (2023–2024)
- Secretary-General: Chaithawat Tulathon (2020–2023); Apichat Sirisunthon (2023–2024)
- Founded: 1 May 2014 (Ruam Pattana Chart Thai Party) 19 January 2019 (Phung Luang Party) 7 December 2019 (Ruam Pattana Chart Thai Party) 19 January 2020 (Move Forward Party)
- Dissolved: 7 August 2024
- Preceded by: Future Forward (de facto)
- Succeeded by: People's Party (de facto); Progressive Movement (de facto)
- Headquarters: 167 Future Forward Building, Bang Kapi, Bangkok
- Think tank: Think Forward Center
- Ideology: Social democracy; Progressivism
- Political position: Centre-left
- Regional affiliation: Network of Social Democracy in Asia
- Colours: Orange
- Slogan: การเมืองดี ปากท้องดี มีอนาคต ('Good politics, good living, good future')
- Anthem: "ก้าวไกลก้าวหน้า" ('Move Forward')

Website
- moveforwardparty.org

The Move Forward Party (MFP; Thai: พรรคก้าวไกล, RTGS: Phak Kao Klai [pʰák kâːw klāj]) was a major social democratic and progressive political party in Thailand. It was the second incarnation of the progressive Future Forward Party, which was founded in 2018 and dissolved by the Constitutional Court on 21 February 2020. In the 2023 general election, the party won the most seats in the House of Representatives but was unable to form a government. The party was dissolved by the Constitutional Court on 7 August 2024 and subsequently succeeded by the third incarnation, the People’s Party (Thai: พรรคประชาชน).

The party’s flagship agenda was to amend Thailand's strict lèse-majesté laws, which forbid the insult of the monarchy. It opposed the remaining influence of the military junta, which ruled the country from 2014 to 2019.

The party was dissolved by the Constitutional Court on 7 August 2024 on the grounds that it violated the constitution by proposing an amendment of a law against insulting the monarchy known as Article 112. The party is succeeded by the People's Party with Natthaphong Ruengpanyawut chosen by members as the party leader.

The party was originally founded in 2014 as the Ruam Pattana Chart Thai Party (Thai: พรรคร่วมพัฒนาชาติไทย) and later changed its name to the Phung Luang Party (Thai: พรรคผึ้งหลวง). After the 2019 Thai general election, it reverted to its original name. It then obtained the name Move Forward on 21 February 2020 after becoming the de facto successor to the dissolved Future Forward Party.

== History ==
The party was officially founded on 1 May 2014 as the Ruam Pattana Chart Thai Party. In early 2020, the party became a de facto successor to the Future Forward Party, which had been dissolved by a controversial Constitutional Court order, as following the decision, 55 of Future Forward's 65 MPs (led by Pita Limjaroenrat) announced their plan to join. They vowed to continue the progressive and anti-junta agenda of Future Forward. The party's name was then changed to Move Forward, along with the release of a new logo similar to that of Future Forward.

=== 2023 election ===
The party won 36.23 percent of the vote in the 2023 general election, gaining 151 seats and becoming the largest party in the House of Representatives, which caused a major electoral upset. Following this success, MFP and seven other parties announced the formation of a coalition aiming to form a government with Pita as prime minister. While the coalition controlled a majority in the lower house, this was not enough to secure the premiership as under the military-drafted constitution, the prime minister is elected by both the elected lower house and the military-appointed senate, and Pita lost his bid to become prime minister on 13 July 2023 after failing to secure enough votes in Parliament. He received 324 votes, 51 votes short of the 375 vote threshold. He also received 182 votes against him with 199 abstentions. In the Senate, where he faced the most opposition, he received 13 votes. Shortly after this, several protests were held in Bangkok in support of Move Forward and Pita, with smaller protests taking place in Phuket.

On 19 July, Pita was suspended from being an MP by the Constitutional Court of Thailand over his shares in the defunct broadcaster ITV he inherited from his father Pongsak Limjaroenrat. While this did not disqualify him from becoming prime minister, Parliament decided on the same day that parliamentary regulations did not allow re-nomination of a failed candidate. Move Forward had previously stated that should it become clear it will not win, the party would instead allow coalition partner Pheu Thai Party, who won the second most votes in the 2023 election, to nominate their own candidate, most likely Paetongtarn Shinawatra or Srettha Thavisin. After holding talks with other parties, who expressed unwillingness to support any coalition including Move Forward, Pheu Thai announced that it would break up the eight-party coalition and instead attempt to form a coalition that excludes Move Forward.

On 15 August, Chaithawat Tulathon announced that the party would not vote of a Pheu Thai candidate for prime minister. This was a result of Pheu Thai planning to expand its coalition to include more conservative parties, such as Bhumjaithai, and parties that supported the military junta, such as United Thai Nation and Palang Pracharat, with Move Forward stating that it was not the will of the people. On 25 August, Sripatum University and D-vote published a poll results conducted between 22 and 24 August on the topic of "If there is an election today, Which party will you vote for?" Move Forward has gained a significant amount of support by over 62.39% since Pheu Thai split with Move Forward in the government formation and formed a government with pro-junta parties.

=== Party leadership change ===
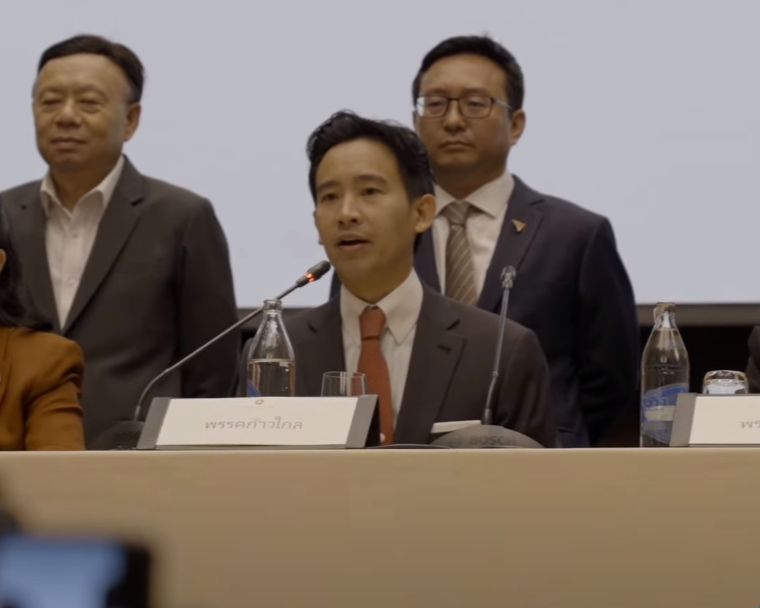
Pita Limjaroenrat (foreground) resigned as party leader in September 2023, and was succeeded by Chaithawat Tulathon (background).

On 23 September 2023 at a party general meeting, Chaithawat Tulathon was elected as the new leader of the Move Forward Party to succeed Pita Limjaroenrat, who stepped down earlier this month due to continuing uncertainty about his status as an MP. Apichart Sirisunthon was appointed as the new secretary-general, taking over from Mr Chaithawat. Additionally, Mr. Pita assumed the role of chairman in a newly formed three-member advisory group. Phicharn Chaowapattanawong, Nattawut Buaprathum, Supisan Phakdeenarunat and Sirikanya Tansakun were named deputy party leaders and Parit Watcharasindhu as the party's spokesperson.

=== 2023 sexual assault scandal ===
Two MFP MPs, Wuttiphong Thonglour of Prachinburi province and Chaiyamparwaan Manpianjit of Bangkok, were found guilty of sexual assault. After a meeting between the party executive committee members and MPs, MFP leader Chaithawat Tulathon announced that the party had reached a consensus, agreeing that the two members found guilty should be expelled from the party. As per the constitution of Thailand, a three-fourth majority vote within the party is required to expel a party member . The case of Wuttiphong Thonglour garnered majority agreement and he was promptly expelled. The case of Chaiyamparwaan Manpianjit, did not attain a sufficient vote, disciplinary action was taken against Chaiyamparwaan Manpianjit, which included a public apology and financial compensation to the victim; however, Chaiyamparwaan was later expelled from the party due to allegations of revealing the victim's identity, thereby violating the conditions set forth by the Move Forward Party.

=== 2024 court rulings ===
==== On Pita ====
On 24 January 2024, the Constitutional Court of Thailand acquitted former Move Forward Party leader Pita Limjaroenrat of owning shares in the defunct media company iTV.

==== On the party's stance on amending lèse-majesté laws ====
In the run-up for a verdict by the Constitutional Court on whether the party's lèse-majesté policies were constitutional, the MFP was confident that the court would side with them. However, the ruling by the Constitutional Court on 31 January ruled that the party and its leaders violated Thailand's constitution through its campaign to amend the country's strict lèse-majesté laws. The nine-member court ruled unanimously that the MFP's attempts to amend the law amounted to an attempt to overthrow the monarchy. The court ordered the party to "stop any act, opinion expression via speech, writing, publishing or advertisement or conveying any message in other forms" that sought to amend the law. The issue had been petitioned to the court by Theerayuth Suwankaesorn.

The ruling opened the way for the party's dissolution, similar to its predecessor the Future Forward Party. Thai political activist and member of the Palang Pracharath Party, Ruangkrai Leekitwattana, has said he was preparing to go to the election commission (EC) on 1 February to seek the party's dissolution. Ruangkrai had previously twice petitioned the EC in 2023 to dissolve the party over it attempts the amend Section 112, and also filed the complaint against Pita over his iTV shares. Due to the court's ruling, the EC must accept Ruangkrai's petition as it represented a breach of Section 92 of the Political Parties Act which stated that the EC must propose any party's dissolution to the Constitutional Court after an act deemed hostile to the monarchy. The former election commissioner, Somchai Srisutthiyakorn, said that dissolution faces several consequences for party executives responsible for proposing the policy in 2021.

In response, MFP lawmaker Wiroj Lakkhanaadisorn said that the movement to amend the lèse-majesté laws would continue even if the party is dissolved, saying that "the word 'party' has already become an ideology". Chaithawat Tulathon said that the verdict risked the monarchy becoming a bigger point of conflict in Thai politics, while Pita told reports after the ruling that the party's policy was not meant to cause any deterioration to the monarchy. The ruling also opens the possibility that no political party in Thailand could ever legally push for amending the law. Munin Pongsapan, associate professor at Thammasat University's Faculty of Law, said that it "effectively mean that the lese majeste law would become untouchable".

In March 2024, Election Commission of Thailand approved a resolution requesting the Constitutional Court to disband the Move Forward Party, based on the court's ruling. In August 2024, the Constitutional Court ruled for the dissolution of the party as well as a 10-year-long ban from politics on eleven former and current party executives. The 143 party-affiliated lawmakers serving in the Thai parliament can retain their seats, but must find a new party within 60 days.

=== Party succession ===
The succeeding party of the Move Forward party is the People's Party (พรรคประชาชน), not to be confused with the People's Party (คณะราษฎร) of the 1920s and 30s, with Natthaphong Ruengpanyawut as the party leader.

== Ideology and political position ==
The Move Forward Party was a progressive centre-left political party. They were known for their pro-democracy platform and their aim to remove military influence in Thai politics. The party's base of support mainly consisted of young and educated urbanites mostly found in Bangkok and its populous suburbs. Some of their policies included the legalisation of same-sex marriage, economic equality, social welfare programs, devolution of government, scrapping military conscription, seeking a referendum concerning the rewriting of the constitution, and reforming the monarchy. It also aimed to amend Thailand's strict lèse-majesté laws and supports scrutinizing the royal budget. In 2023, the party ran on a platform emphasizing the "3Ds" of demilitarization, demonopolization, and decentralization, which Limjaroenrat said would lead to democratization, peace process, and reform.

=== 2023 manifesto ===
Social policy

- Allow elections for provincial governors
- Reform the Lèse-majesté laws
- Reduce military influence in politics
- Reduce bureaucracy & promote transparency
- Replace military conscription with a voluntary system
- Draft & implement a new democratic constitution
- Decentralize the central government
- Decriminalize sex work, adult toys & films
- Legalize same-sex marriage
- Promote gender equality & reduce domestic violence
- Promote LGBT+ rights

Economic policy

- Raising the minimum wage to ฿450 (Adjusted with inflation every year)
- Break up monopolies and increase competition in the economy
- Encourage health/wellness & green tourism
- Promote the freedom for workers to join labor unions & collectively bargain
- Reduce tax burdens for SMEs

Welfare policy

- Establish a modern welfare state
- Establish a 40-hour workweek (People working over 40 hr. must be paid overtime)
- Expand child benefits (฿3000 gift for newborns & ฿1200/month for each children)
- Expand maternity leave to 180 days (for both parents)
- Expand childcare services
- Increase funding for mental health services
- Promote fair employment benefits & contracts

Education policy

- Reform the education system to be friendlier & safer for students
- Reform school curriculum to include more choices for students
- Encourage schools to be bilingual
- Increase funding for public education
- Allow students to have more freedom in their choices of clothes (no mandatory uniforms)
- Improve work-life balance for students

== Organization ==
=== Leadership ===
Move Forward has been led by Chaithawat Tulathon from 23 September 2023 to 7 August 2024.

Leader	Portrait	Constituency	Took office	Left office	Government		
Leader	Portrait	Constituency	Took office	Left office	Party	Prime Minister	Term
Pita Limjaroenrat		Party-list	14 March 2020 (Unopposed)	23 September 2023	UTN	Prayut	2019–23
Pita Limjaroenrat		Party-list	14 March 2020 (Unopposed)	23 September 2023	PTP	Srettha	2023–25
Chaithawat Tulathon		Party-list	23 September 2023 (Unopposed)	7 August 2024 (Party dissolved)	PTP	Srettha	2023–25

=== Party structure ===
Since 23 September 2023:

- Leader: Chaithawat Tulathon
  - First Deputy Leader: Phicharn Chaowapattanawong
  - Second Deputy Leader: Nattawut Buaprathum
  - Third Deputy Leader: Supisan Phakdeenaruna
  - Fourth Deputy Leader: Sirikanya Tansakul
- Secretary General: Apichart Sirisunthon
- Deputy Secretaries General: Natthaphong Ruengpanyawut, Surachet Pravinvongvuth, Nattacha Boonchaiinsawat
- Spokesperson: Parit Watcharasindhu
- Advisory Chairman: Pita Limjaroenrat

== Election results ==
Results of the Constituency Vote for the Move Forward Party in the 2023 Thai General Election.

=== General elections ===
Election	Total seats won	Total votes	Share of votes	Seat changes	Outcome of election	Election leader
Phung Luang Party era
2019	0 / 500	12,576	0.03%	0 seats	No representation in Parliament	Kongphop Wangsunthon
Move Forward Party era
2023	151 / 500	14,438,851	37.99%	▲151 seats ▲70 seats (comparison to Future Forward Party in 2019)	Opposition	Pita Limjaroenrat

=== Bangkok Metropolitan Administration elections ===
==== Bangkok gubernatorial elections ====
Election	Candidate	Total votes	Share of votes	Outcome
2022	Wiroj Lakkhanaadisorn	253,938	9.57%	Lost ✗

==== Bangkok Metropolitan Council elections ====
Election	Total seats won	Total votes	Share of votes	Seat changes
2022	14 / 50	485,830	20.85%	▲14 seats
