= Ruangkrai Leekitwattana =

Thai politician (born 1961)

- เรืองไกร ลีกิจวัฒนะ
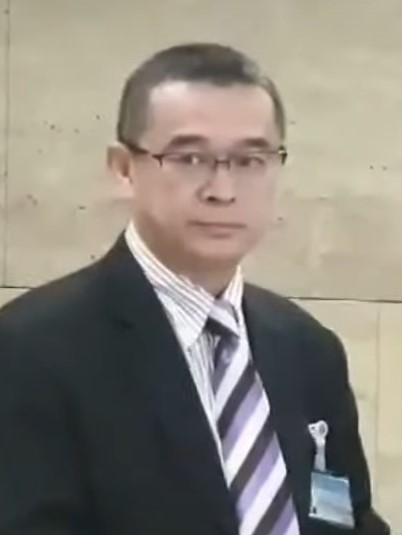

Member of the Senate of Thailand
- In office 19 February 2008 – 18 February 2011

Personal details
- Born: 26 August 1961 (age 64) Buriram province, Thailand
- Party: Palang Pracharath
- Other political affiliations: Pheu Thai (201?–2018); Thai Raksa Chart (2018–2019)
- Spouse: Anothai Leekitwattana

Ruangkrai Leekitwattana (Thai: เรืองไกร ลีกิจวัฒนะ) is a Thai lawyer and political activist. A former senator and member of the Palang Pracharath Party, Ruangkrai has often sought the ouster of incumbent opposition candidates, including the current prime minister of Thailand Paetongtarn Shinawatra. His petitions often involve ethics complaints submitted to Thailand's National Anti-Corruption Commission.

In 2024, he sought to dissolve Thailand's progressive Move Forward Party due to the party's support of amendments to the lese-majeste law. The Constitutional Court dissolved the party in August 2024.
