= Sirikanya Tansakun =

Thai politician (born 1981)

- ศิริกัญญา ตันสกุล
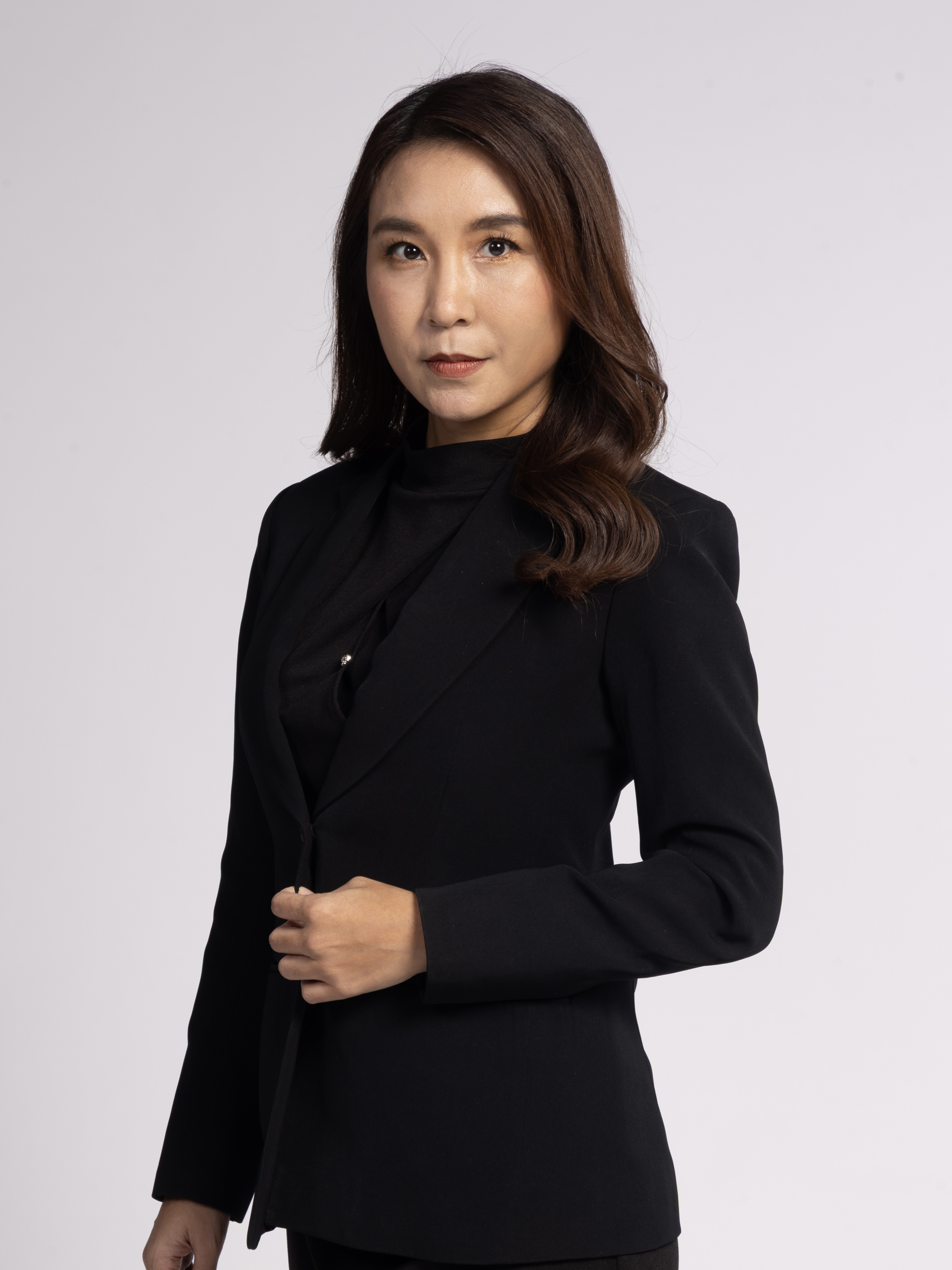
- Official Portrait in December 2025

Deputy Leader of the People's Party
- Incumbent
- Assumed office 9 August 2024
- Preceded by: Herself (Move Forward Party; de facto)

Deputy Leader of the Move Forward Party
- In office 14 March 2020 – 7 August 2024

Member of the House of Representatives
- Incumbent
- Assumed office 24 March 2019

Personal details
- Born: 4 April 1981 (age 44)
- Education: Thammasat University (MA); Toulouse Capitole University (MA)

Sirikanya Tansakun (Thai: ศิริกัญญา ตันสกุล) is a Thai politician and former academic, serving as the deputy leader of the People's Party, the de facto successor to the Move Forward Party, which was dissolved by the Constitutional Court in August 2024. Tansakun served as the deputy leader of Move Forward Party from 2020 to 2024.

== Career ==
She graduated from Thammasat University with a bachelor's and master's degree in economics and later earned a master's degree from the University of Toulouse

Tansakun previously served as a research fellow at the Thailand Development Research Institute. She later joined the Future Forward Party and its successor Move Forward Party. She served as head of the Move Forward Party's economic policy team.

In February 2024, Sirikanya Tansakun criticized Prime Minister Srettha Thavisin's public arguments with the Bank of Thailand regarding a push to lower interest rates.

In August 2024, Tansakun was widely considered the favorite to lead the People's Party following the dissolution of the Move Forward Party, but Natthaphong Ruengpanyawut was chosen instead.

In September 2024, Tansakun warned that Thailand's debt and interest burden would lead to a credit downgrade.

In October 2024, Tansakun criticized the "digital wallet" stimulus scheme enacted by the Pheu Thai-led government, claiming the plan differed from the original proposal to distribute money digitally. She previously expressed skepticism about how the plan would be financed and distributed.

== Awards ==
- 2020 — The Most Noble Order of the Crown of Thailand.
