= 2019 Thai prime ministerial candidates =

This article lists candidates for the 2019 Thai prime minister. There were 69 candidates in total (45 parties).

== Bhumjaithai Party ==
Anutin Charnvirakul	Deputy Minister of Public Health (2001–2005); Leader of Bhumjaithai Party

== Chart Pattana Party ==
Suwat Liptapanlop	Deputy Prime Minister of Thailand (2005–2006); Chief Advisor of Chart Pattana Party
Wannarat Channukul	Deputy Prime Minister of Thailand (2005–2006); Minister of Industry (2011–2012); Chairman of Chart Pattana Party
Tewan Liptapanlop	Member of House of Representatives (2005–2006); Leader of Chart Pattana Party

== Chartthaipattana Party ==
Kanchana Silpa-archa	Deputy Minister of Education (1999–2001); Leader of Chartthaipattana Party

== Commoner Party of Thailand ==
Thanaporn Sriyakul	Teacher of Faculty of Business Administration Mahanakorn University of Technology; Leader of Commoner Party of Thailand

== Democrat Party ==
Abhisit Vejjajiva	Prime Minister of Thailand (2008–2011); Leader of Democrat Party

== Future Forward Party ==
Thanathorn Juangroongruangkit	Vice-president of the Thai Summit Group (2002–2018); Leader of Future Forward Party

== Green Party ==
Phongsa Choonaem	Royal Forest Department servant; Leader of Green Party

== Kasikornthai Party ==
Tussachon Phongpakawat	Manager of WAY Nature & Herb; Secretary of Kasikornthai Party

== Moderate Party ==
Chumphon Khrutkaeo	IT consultant of Institute for the Promotion of Teaching Science and Technology and National Anti-Corruption Commission; Leader of Moderate Party

== New Aspiration Party ==
Chingchai Mongcoltam	Minister of Education (1997); Leader of New Aspiration Party

== Phalang Pracharat Party ==
Prayut Chan-o-cha	Prime Minister of Thailand (2014–present)

== Pheu Thai Party ==
Sudarat Keyuraphan	Minister of Agriculture and Cooperatives (2005–2006); Election Strategy President of Pheu Thai Party
Chadchart Sittipunt	Minister of Transport (2012–2014)
Chaikasem Nitisiri	Minister of Justice (2013–2014)

== Prachachart Party ==
Wan Muhamad Noor Matha	Leader of Prachachart Party; Deputy Prime Minister of Thailand; Minister of Agriculture and Cooperatives (2004–2005); Minister of Interior (2002–2004); Minister of Transport (1995–96 and 2001–02); President of the National Assembly of Thailand (1996–2000); Speakers of the House of Representatives (1996–2000); Director of the National Drug Control Centre; University lecturer at Songkhla Rajabhat University; University lecturer at Thaksin University
Tawee Sodsong	Secretary of the Southern Border Provinces Administrative Center (2011–2014); Secretary-General of Prachachart Party
Nahathai Thewphaingarm	Vice Spokeswoman of the Thai government (2001–2004)

== Thai Citizens' Party ==
Sumit Sundaravej	Leader of Thai Citizens'Party
Kanisorn Sommaluan	Secretary of Thai Citizens' Party

== Thai Liberal Party ==
Seripisut Temiyavet	Commissioner-General of the Royal Thai Police (2007–2008); Leader of Thai Liberal Party

== Thai Moderate Party ==
Chumpol Krutkaew	Ultramarathon Runner; Leader of Thai Moderate Party

== Thai Social Democratic Party ==
Somsak Kosaisuuk	Secretary general of the State Enterprise Labour Relations Confederation; Leader of Thai Social Democratic Party
