= Zhuang (surname) =

- Romanization: Chuang/Zhuāng (Mandarin); Zong (Cantonese); Chong, Zong (Hakka); Chng, Chong (Hokkien)
- Language: Chinese

Origin
- Language: Old Chinese
- Meaning: Dignified, grave

Other names
- Variant forms: Trang (Vietnamese); Jang (Korean); Shō (Japanese)
- Derivatives: Budiman, Dozan, Juanda, Juandi, Mercubuwono (Chinese Indonesian)
- See also: Yan (surname 嚴)

Zhuang is the pinyin romanization of the Chinese surname written 莊 in Traditional Chinese and 庄 in Simplified Chinese. It is usually romanized as "Chuang" in Taiwan in the Wade-Giles system.

Zhuang is listed 323rd in the Song dynasty classic text Hundred Family Surnames. As of 2008, it is the 113th most common surname in China, shared by 1.6 million people.

== Romanizations ==
Zhuang is romanized as Chuang in the Wade-Giles system usually employed in Taiwan and among the Chinese diaspora. It is romanized Chong in Cantonese; Chng, Tsng, or Ching in Hokkien.

In Vietnamese, the surname formerly written as 莊 in Chữ Hán is now written Trang; in Korean, the surname formerly written as 莊 in Hanja is now written 장 and romanized as Jang; in Japanese, the surname written 荘 in Kanji is romanized Shō. In Thai, it is written as จึง (RTGS: Chueng).

== Distribution ==
As of 2008, Zhuang is the 113th most common surname in mainland China, shared by 1.6 million people. It has been ranked the 24th-most-common surname on Taiwan.

Zhuang is a rather uncommon name in the United States. It was ranked 53,245th during the 1990 census and 31,703rd in 2000. Chuang is more common, having been ranked 24,816th in 1990 and 11,621st in 2000. The variant spellings Chong, Ching, and Tong are all much more common, but include other Chinese surnames as well.

== History ==
The pronunciation of 莊 has been reconstructed as *tsraŋ in Old Chinese and Tsrjang in Middle Chinese; its original meaning was "dignified" and "grave".

As with many Chinese surnames, the current bearers come from a variety of origins, some legendary.

The Manuscript of the Words and Deeds of Virtuous Clans claimed that the first Zhuangs were descended from King Zhuang of Chu.

Another group descended from Duke Dai of Song, who was also known as Zhuang.

During the Warring States period, the general Zhuang Qiao (莊跤) of Chu attacked Shu but was blocked from returning home by Qin troops. He proclaimed himself king of Dian. A third group were the subjects of this realm.

All three groups found themselves bound to change their names to Yan (嚴) upon the ascension of the Han Ming Emperor, whose personal name was Zhuang, owing to the naming taboo. Most did change back to Zhuang during the Northern and Southern dynasties era after Han dynasty but many still remain as Yan until today.

By the period of the Sixteen States, however, the Zhuangs had spread from Lianghu to other regions such as Shandong, Gansu, Zhejiang, and Fujian.

== Notable people with the surname ==
- Queenzy Cheng (1986–2023), Malaysian singer-actress
- Michael Chong (born 1971), Canadian politician of Chinese descent
- Zhuangzi (c. 369 BC–c. 286 BC) or Chuang Tzu, Taoist philosopher
- Zhuang Chuo, a Song-era writer
- Zhuang Cunyu, Confucian scholar
- Zhuang Datian, leader of a peasant rebellion
- Zhuang Ji, a Han-era writer and critic
- Zhuang Jia (Qi), a Qi official executed for insubordination
- Zhuang Jia (rebel), assassin of Chen Sheng
- Zhuang Qiao, Chu

general and king of Dian

- Zhuang Yushan (born 2003), Chinese volleyball player
- Sabrina Zhuang (born 2001), Chinese actress and singer
- Zhuang Tinglong, scholar imprisoned for completing the History of the Ming Dynasty
- Xiaowei Zhuang
- Chuang Che, a Chinese artist
- Zhuang Zedong, world table tennis champion
- JJ Zhuang, tech entrepreneur and computer programmer
- Zhuang Kezhu, lieutenant general of the PLA Air Force
- Chutimon Chuengcharoensukying, Thai model and actress
- Thanathorn Juangroongruangkit, Thai businessman, politician and activist
- Suriya Juangroongruangkit, Thai politician
- Pongkawin Jungrungruangkit, Thai politician
- Somporn Juangroongruangkit, business woman
