= Chulabhorn (disambiguation) =

Chulabhorn is a princess of Thailand.

Chulaborn may also refer to the following, named after her the princess:

- Chulabhorn District, in Nakhon Si Thammarat Province
- Chulabhorn Dam, on the Nam Phrom River in Chaiyaphum Province
- Chulabhorn Graduate Institute, a multidisciplinary post-graduate academic institute
- Chulabhorn Research Institute, a biomedical and chemistry research institute in Bangkok
- Princess Chulabhorn's College, a group of science coeducation boarding schools
