= Zhuang Jia =

Zhuang Jia (Chinese: t 莊賈, s 庄贾, Zhuāng Jiǎ) may refer to:

- Zhuang Jia (Qi), the Qi official put to death for insubordination
- Zhuang Jia (rebel), the Qin rebel who assassinated Chen Sheng
