= 2019 Thai general election =

- 24 March 2019

All 500 seats in the House of Representatives 251 seats needed for a majority
- Registered: 51,239,638
- Turnout: 74.69% (▲26.97pp)
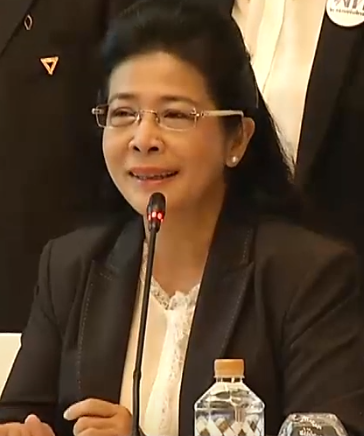

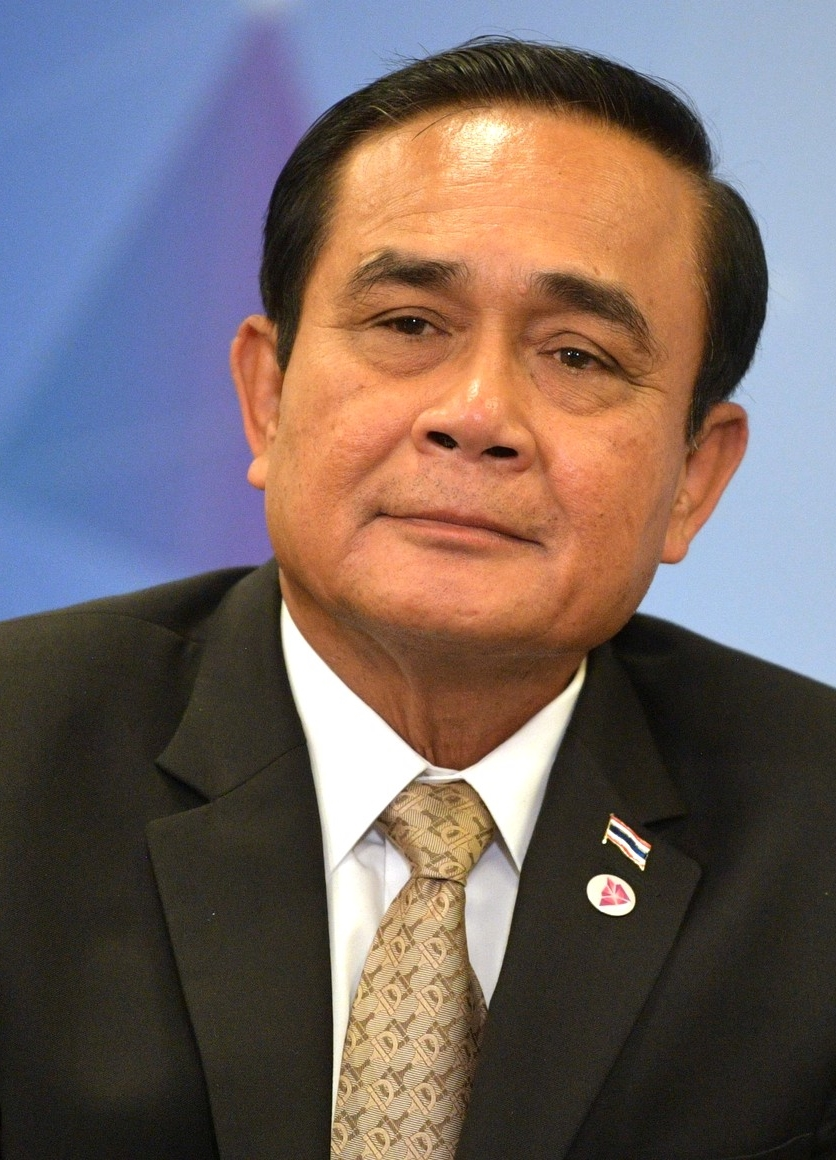

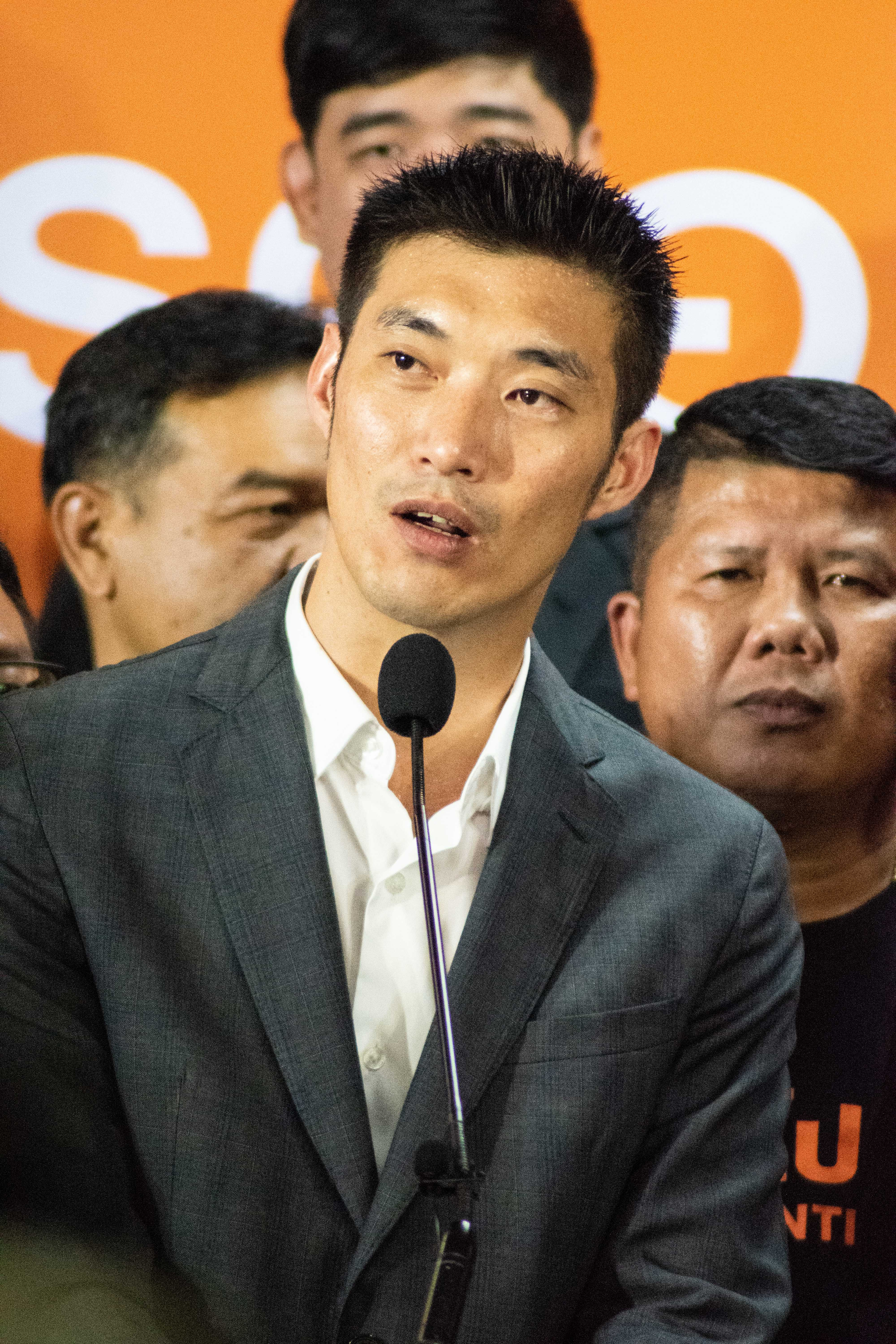

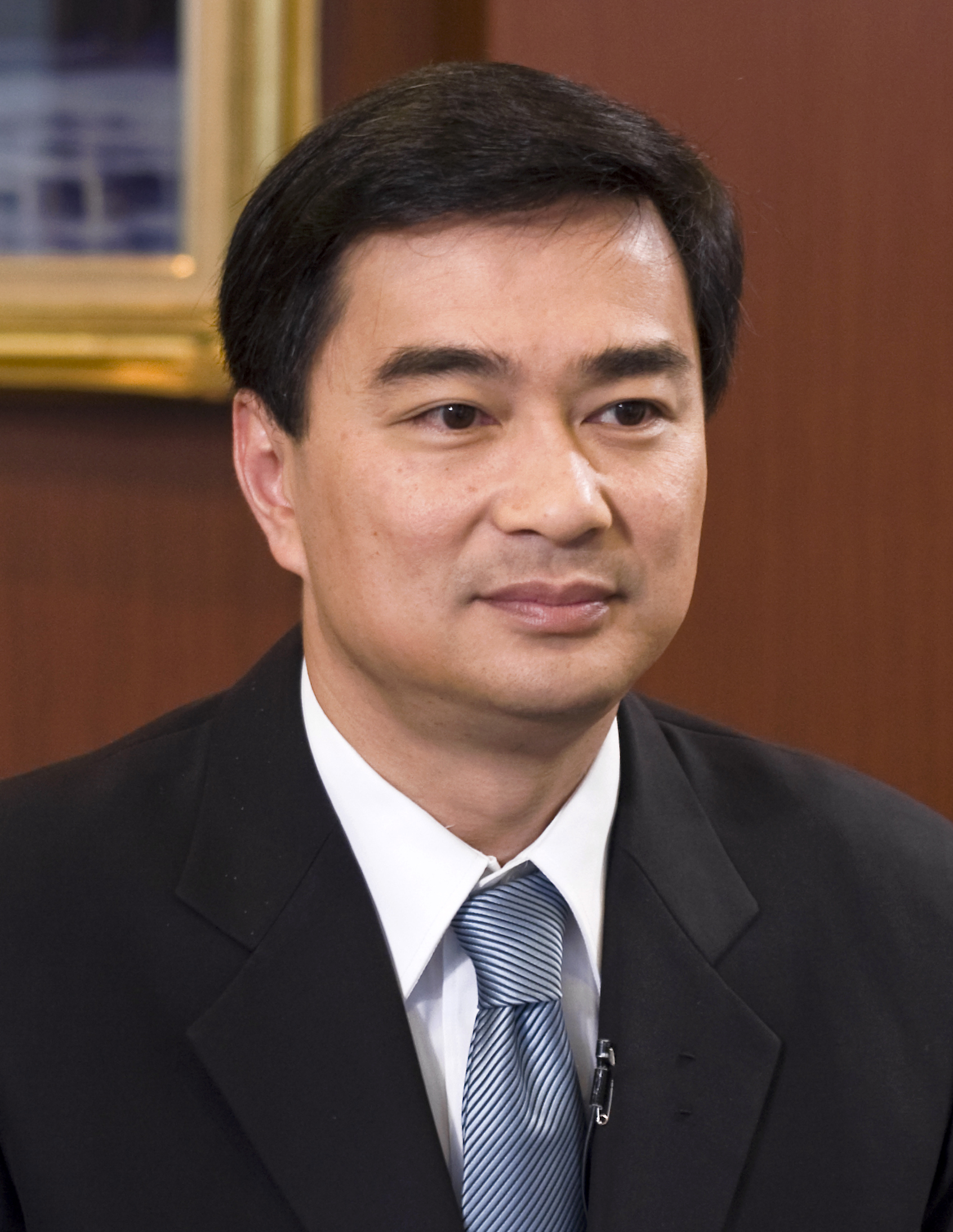

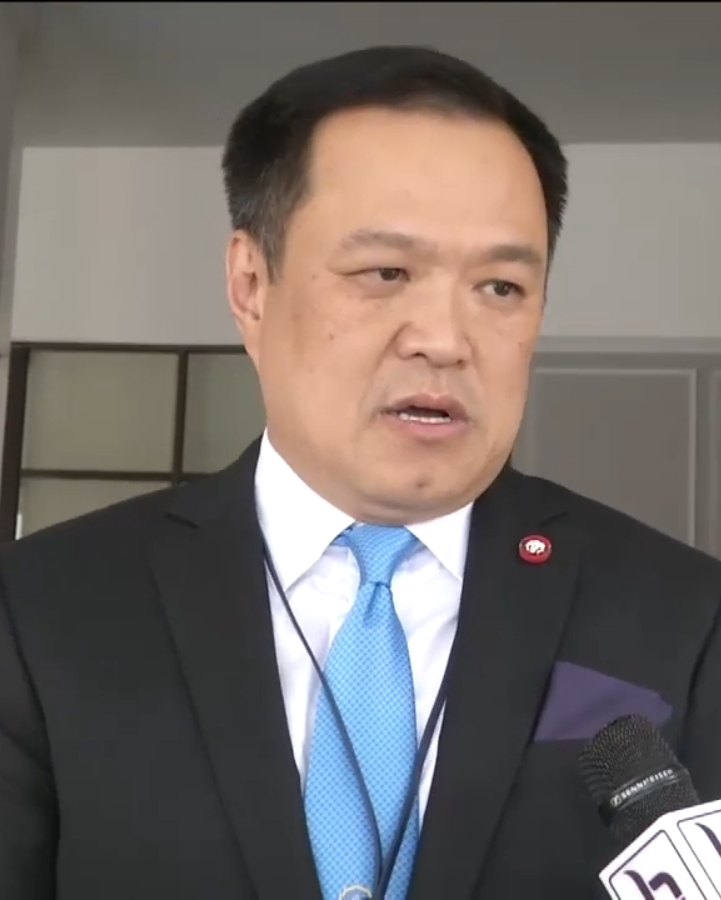
	First party	Second party	Third party
Candidate	Sudarat Keyuraphan (Note: The Prime Ministerial candidates for the Pheu Thai Party are Sudarat Keyuraphan, Chadchart Sittipunt and Chaikasem Nitisiri, however Sudarat Keyuraphan is the lead candidate for Prime Minister.)	Prayut Chan-o-cha (independent)	Thanathorn Juangroongruangkit
Party	Pheu Thai	Palang Pracharath	Future Forward
Seats won	136	116	81
Popular vote	7,920,630	8,433,137	6,265,950
Percentage	21.92%	23.34%	17.34%
	Fourth party	Fifth party
Candidate	Abhisit Vejjajiva	Anutin Charnvirakul
Party	Democrat	Bhumjaithai
Seats won	53	51
Popular vote	3,947,726	3,732,883
Percentage	10.92%	10.33%
- Results by constituency
Prime Minister before election
Prayut Chan-o-cha
Independent (NCPO)
Prime Minister-designate
Prayut Chan-o-cha
Independent (PPRP)

General elections were held in Thailand on 24 March 2019. They were the first elections since the 2014 Thai coup d'état that installed coup leader General Prayut Chan-o-cha as prime minister, and the first held in accordance with the 2017 constitution, which was drafted under the ruling military junta. The elections selected the five hundred members of the new House of Representatives, the previous House having been dissolved by the coup.

Seventy-seven parties contested the elections, including the two major parties, Pheu Thai (which supported former prime minister Thaksin Shinawatra and held a majority of seats prior to the coup) and the Democrat Party (the main opposition party prior to the coup). They were joined by several new parties, which mostly campaigned on a pro- or anti-junta stance. The former included the Prayut-aligned Palang Pracharath Party, while the latter included the Future Forward Party, which catered to young voters, as well as several Pheu Thai–aligned parties.

The elections were held using a new mixed-member apportionment system, in which voters cast a single vote for both a constituency candidate and a nationwide party list, with the nationwide list used as leveling seats to achieve proportional representation. Under the new constitution, the prime minister did not need to be an elected member of the House, and would be chosen by the full Parliament, including the 250 members of the Senate, rather than only members of the House as previously.

The elections were widely seen as a skewed race in which Prayut had an unfair advantage, as the 250 sitting members of the appointed Senate were to be selected by the junta. The Royal Family was involved to an unusual degree; the Pheu Thai–aligned Thai Raksa Chart Party named Princess Ubol Ratana, the elder sister of King Vajiralongkorn, as its candidate for prime minister, leading to condemnation by the King and the party's dissolution by the Constitutional Court. In a move criticised on social media and interpreted as a political intervention, Vajiralongkorn issued a statement on the night prior to the election urging the public to support "good people" to prevent "chaos", quoting remarks by his father, the late king.

Overseas voting took place from 28 January to 19 February, and advanced voting took place throughout the country on 17 March. The main election took place from 08:00 to 17:00 on 24 March. Rights groups and election monitors criticized the election for its biased environment, and the Election Commission for many errors and irregularities. The announcement of the results was repeatedly delayed; unofficial results were announced on 28 March, four days after the election. Official results were announced on 8 May.

Although Palang Pracharath received the most votes and won 116 seats, Pheu Thai emerged as the largest party with 136 seats. Most of the remaining seats were won by the Future Forward, Democrat and Bhumjaithai parties. Pheu Thai and Future Forward announced a seven-party alliance soon after the election, but were unable to form a government. Parliament convened on 24 May and on 5 June voted to make Prayut prime minister.

== Background ==
Early general elections had been held on 2 February 2014 after Prime Minister Yingluck Shinawatra asked King Bhumibol Adulyadej to dissolve parliament more than a year early due to a political crisis. The leaders of the anti-government protests objected to the polls, instead demanding that there be "reform before elections" and the Yingluck government be replaced with a royally-appointed "reform council". The elections were thus boycotted by the main opposition party, the Democrat Party, and disruption by protesters meant that voting in some constituencies had to be delayed until a later date, while absentee voters in urban areas were unable to vote.

In April 2014 the Constitutional Court ruled that the election was unconstitutional because the vote had not taken place on the same day nationwide. Following an agreement between the Election Commission and Yingluck's government, the fresh elections were set for 20 July. However, the elections were cancelled after a coup d'état in May deposed the elected government and installed a military government known as the National Council for Peace and Order (NCPO), led by General Prayut Chan-o-cha, then-Commander in Chief of the Royal Thai Army. The NCPO, on taking power, declared its intention to hold general elections after carrying out reforms and promulgating a new constitution.

=== Delays ===
The date of the 2019 general elections had been subject to much speculation, given the uncertainty of Prayut and the junta since taking power in the May 2014 coup.

Shortly after the 2014 coup, Prayut said that elections would likely be held "by the end of 2015". By late 2014, however, several government officials had said publicly that elections would not be held until 2016, around mid-year.

In May 2015 Deputy Prime Minister Wissanu Krea-ngam said that elections would now be held "around August or in September" 2016, after the government announced its intention to hold a referendum on its draft constitution, which would likely be held sometime in early 2016.

In June 2015 Prayut said that he was willing to stay in office for another two years if people "wanted him to", following a push by the National Reform Council (NRC), a government body established by the National Council for Peace and Order (NCPO), to hold a vote on whether or not the government's reforms should be completed before elections were held. This would mean general elections might potentially not be held until early 2018, but a few days later distanced himself from the NRC's initiative after facing backlash for his remarks, saying "I'm not interested. It's all about the roadmap. Stop asking me [about the matter]."

In October 2017 Prime Minister Prayut pledged that a general election would be held sometime in November 2018. However, the selection of an election date gave way to rumours that Prime Minister Prayut would attempt to stay in power after the next election through a military-backed political party. While this was the case, in January 2018 Thailand's parliamentary body voted to postpone enforcement of a new election law by 90 days, further dragging out the timing of an election. At the time, the deputy prime minister said the parliament's decision could delay the election until February–March 2019.

On 3 January 2019 Deputy Prime Minister Wissanu Krea-ngam told that the election will be delayed citing the royal coronation ceremony as the cause of the delay. In response, former EC commissioner Somchai Srisutthiyakorn said the coronation doesn't affect the election and the previously promised 24 February date is still possible.

Although the election date has to be set by the Election Commission, they cannot do so until the government issues a royal decree formally announcing the election. The government did not issue a royal decree on 3 January as previously planned and has declined to say when they will do so.

On 10 January the Bangkok Post reported that 24 February date for the election was no longer possible because the government has not published a royal decree and the EC would need at least 45 days to prepare the election. The following day, Wissanu Krea-ngam announced that the royal decree will be released sometime in January, paving way for an election "no later than March."

== Electoral system ==
Changes to the voting system, introduced by the 2017 constitution, were first implemented in this election. Whereas previous general elections in Thailand since 2001 used a parallel voting system, with voters marking two ballots, one for their constituency and one for a nationwide party list, the new system, referred to as "mixed-member apportionment", uses a mixed single vote for both the constituency and the party list (which makes it a variant of the mixed-member proportional system). The 350 constituency seats are won by first-past-the-post voting as in previous elections. However, the 150 party-list seats serve a compensatory function, and are allocated so as to give each party a total number of seats proportional to the nationwide number of votes they received (top-up).

Other changes introduced by the new constitution are the removal of the requirement that the prime minister be selected from among the elected members of the House of Representatives. Instead, each party may name, in advance, up to three candidates to nominate as prime minister if they achieve a majority. Also, the prime minister will be voted on by the combined National Assembly, which also includes the 250 members of the Senate, Thailand's upper house, rather than only by the House of Representatives, as was previously done.

As the entire sitting Senate will be appointed by the NCPO, commentators say that the change opens up the strong possibility that Prayut will become Thailand's next prime minister despite pro-Prayut parties being predicted to win fewer seats in the House of Representatives. With the assumption that all 250 senators will support Prayut, pro-Prayut parties would only need to win 126 seats for him to be selected as prime minister.

=== Constituency boundary controversy ===
Under the new constitution, the number of constituencies was reduced from 400 to 350. In 2018, the Election Commission (ECT) was tasked with drawing up new district boundaries. However, shortly before the ECT were about to announce the new boundaries, Prime Minister Prayut invoked Section 44 of the constitution to issue an order pushing back the deadline and delaying the announcement. The order also exempted the ECT from complying with existing districting laws and allowing them to draw constituency boundaries in any manner they wished.

The move sparked outrage from the Pheu Thai and Democrat parties and the watchdog organisation Open Forum for Democracy Foundation. They argued the purpose of the delay was to enable the ECT to draw constituency boundaries that favoured Prayut's Palang Pracharath Party. Some journalists and commentators compared this to gerrymandering, while others opined that the changes meant that the elections were a foregone conclusion.

Election Commission chairman Ittiporn Boonpracong denied the allegations, citing his eye surgery as the cause of the delay. The EC completed and released the new district constituencies on 29 November. Following the release, political parties and watchdog organisations stated that they had found several instances of gerrymandering that would benefit the Palang Pracharat Party.

== Campaign ==
In total, seventy-seven parties contested the elections. Among them are the two major parties of the previous elected house, Pheu Thai (the majority) and the Democrat Party (the opposition), as well as the smaller long-standing players Bhumjaithai, Chartthaipattana and Chart Pattana.

Several new parties also ran for the first time. The Palang Pracharath Party directly supported Prayut, and included several of his cabinet members. Other smaller pro-Prayut parties include the Action Coalition for Thailand, led by 2013–2014 protest leader Suthep Thaugsuban, and the People Reform Party, headed by Paiboon Nititawan.

On the opposing end, many parties took an anti-junta stance. These include several Pheu Thai–aligned parties, as well as other groups. As the election laws and regulatory bodies were seen as stacked and biased against their favour, Pheu Thai split off into a network of several smaller affiliated parties in order to distribute their risk from legal intervention. These parties were Thai Raksa Chart, Puea Chat (consisting of several United Front for Democracy Against Dictatorship leaders), and Prachachart.

The other anti-military parties include the Future Forward Party, which is led by multimillionaire businessman Thanathorn Juangroongruangkit and campaigned on a strong liberal stance catering to young voters, and the Thai Liberal Party, led by former police commissioner Seripisut Temiyavet.

== Royal interventions ==
On the night of 8 February, the day Princess Ubol Ratana was nominated as prime minister candidate by Thai Raksa Chart Party, her younger brother King Vajiralongkorn made a televised announcement condemning her bid as "defy[ing] the nation's culture". The party was later dissolved by the Constitutional Court. The move was a huge blow to anti-Prayut camp, as Thaksin made a tactical decision to field two parties to win as many seats as possible.

On the night of 23 March, just hours before the polls opened, King Vajiralongkorn again made a televised announcement that he would like to warn people by citing a speech given by his father, Bhumibol Adulyadej, 30 years ago, saying good people should be supported to govern so they can prevent bad people from creating trouble. This made the hashtag "#โตแล้วเลือกเองได้" ("We are grown up, we can choose by ourselves") trending at number 1 on Twitter soon afterwards. During the election hours, the royal announcement was repeatedly re-broadcast on television and the Election Commission president stated to the press urging the Thais to make their choices by "taking the royal announcement into account".

== Eligible prime ministerial candidates ==
Prior to the 2017 Thai Constitution, any elected House of Representative member could be voted upon and selected as prime minister.

Under the new constitution, political parties can name up to three candidates for prime minister prior to the election. These candidates do not have to be members of the House of Representatives or even members of a political party as long as they meet the legal qualifications.

The candidates for the main contending parties are Sudarat Keyuraphan, Chadchart Sittipunt and Chaikasem Nitisiri for Pheu Thai, Abhisit Vejjajiva for the Democrats, Prayut Chan-o-cha for Palang Pracharat, and Thanathorn Juangroongruangkit for Future Forward.

== Opinion polls ==
Graph of opinion polls conducted. Trend lines represent local regressions.

=== Preferred party ===
Date(s) conducted	Polling organisation/client	Sample size	PTP	Dem	PPRP	FFP	Other	Lead
12 Feb–20 Mar 2019	Bangkok Poll	10,062	25.6	15.1	25.9	20.5	12.9	0.3
4–6 Mar 2019	Bangkok Poll	1,735	21.7	15.5	19.0	12.0	31.8	8.9
15 Feb 2019	FT Confidential Research	1,000	24	14	9	11	42	10
11 Feb 2019	Rangsit University	8,000	16.90	18.30	21.50	7.40	35.9	3.20
4–7 Feb 2019	NIDA	2,091	36.49	15.21	22.57	8.18	17.55	13.92
2–15 Jan 2019	NIDA	2,500	32.72	14.92	24.16	11.00	17.20	8.56
24 Dec 2018	Rangsit University	8,000	25.38	22.62	26.03	9.80	16.17	0.65
10–22 Dec 2018	Super Poll/YouGov Asia	1,094	38.30	22.80	4.70	24.40	9.80	13.90
24 Nov 2018	Rangsit University	8,000	23.64	19.01	26.61	8.84	21.90	2.97
20–22 Nov 2018	NIDA	1,260	31.75	16.98	19.92	15.63	15.72	11.83
17–18 Sep 2018	NIDA	1,251	28.78	19.58	20.62	15.51	15.51	8.16
17–19 Jul 2018	NIDA	1,257	31.19	16.47	21.88	9.63	20.83	9.31
8–9 May 2018	NIDA	1,250	32.16	19.20	25.12	11.60	11.92	7.04
3 Jul 2011	2011 election	75.03%	48.41	35.15	N/A	N/A	16.44	13.26

Note: The Rangsit University poll is often criticised for its alleged bias towards Prayut and Palang Pracharat. Sangsit Phiriyarangsan, who leads the polling effort, is a staunch public supporter of Prayut's and sceptics accuse him of artificially inflating Prayut and Palang Pracharat's poll numbers.

After the publication of the December poll, Sangsit announced that he will no longer publish polls under the university's name to protect the institution from criticism. However, in February, Sangsit and Rangsit University released another poll.

=== Preferred prime minister ===
Traditionally, political parties support their party leader as the prime minister. However, in this election, multiple parties have declared support for Prayut Chan-o-cha as the next prime minister. Prayut is not an official member of any political party, however, several of his cabinet ministers and advisors are leaders of the Palang Pracharath Party. Palang Pracharat is widely acknowledged as the political vehicle for Prayut to return as prime minister in a democratic regime. On 8 February, Prayut officially became Palang Pracharat's candidate for prime minister.

In a December 2018 interview, Satitra Thananithichoti, an academic with expertise in polling and analysis, raised concerns with prime minister candidate polls. He revealed that from the polling data he has seen, a significant number of people said their preferred prime minister candidate was Prayut but also stated that their preferred political party was Pheu Thai, which does not support Prayut. Satitra pointed out that this could explain why Prayut regularly wins PM polls while Palang Pracharat often loses in party polls.

Date(s) conducted	Polling organisation/client	Sample size	Prayut	Sudarat	Abhisit	Thanathorn	Other	Lead
12 Feb–20 Mar 2019	Bangkok Poll	10,062	28.7	20.6	14.8	19.2	16.7	7.1
4–7 Feb 2019	NIDA	2,091	26.06	24.01	11.43	5.98	32.52	6.46
2–15 Jan 2019	NIDA	2,500	26.20	22.40	11.56	9.60	30.24	4.04
24 Dec 2018	Rangsit University	8,000	26.04	25.28	22.68	9.90	16.10	0.76
24 Nov 2018	Rangsit University	8,000	27.06	18.16	15.55	9.68	29.55	2.49
20–22 Nov 2018	NIDA	1,260	24.05	25.16	11.67	14.52	24.60	1.11
17–18 Sep 2018	NIDA	1,251	29.66	17.51	10.71	13.83	28.29	1.37
17–19 Jul 2018	NIDA	1,257	31.26	14.96	10.50	7.48	35.80	4.54
8–9 May 2018	NIDA	1,250	32.24	17.44	14.24	10.08	18.08	14.80

=== Seat projections ===
Polling organisation/client	PTP	PPRP	Dem	BJT	FFP	Other	Lead
Election results	137	116	52	51	80	64	21
Dusit Poll	173	96	88	40	49	54	77
Super Poll / YouGov Asia	163	96	77	59	40	55	67
Voice TV	175	91	81	40	43	70	84
2011 election	265	N/A	159	34	N/A	16.44	106

== Conduct ==
The election was widely seen as unfree and unfair, due to the creation of an electoral system designed to favour the junta's newly created Myanmar-style civil-military state-sponsored political party, Palang Pracharat, which developed a 'Pracharat' ('People's State) brand accompanied by state handouts up to the eve of the election; deliberate manipulation of election rules typical in electoral authoritarianism, including gerrymandering and the poaching of politicians from other parties; a biased voting environment; and a pattern of biased decision-making by the Election Commission. The Election Commission, which was appointed by the junta-appointed 2014 National Legislative Assembly, was widely criticized for perceived biases and incompetency. The polling process saw many reports of irregularities, and the counting process and initial results were very confused, as the live figures released by the EC contained large amounts of errors. Unofficial results, which typically would be known by the same night and announced next morning, were repeatedly delayed (for 44 days), as the Election Committee revised the method of allocating votes, until the Palang Pracharat Party was able to form a coalition government.

In addition, Human Rights Watch cited political repression, media censorship, unequal media access, the role of a military-appointed Senate in appointing an unelected prime minister (the junta leader), and lack of independence and impartiality of the Election Commission as factors preventing a free and fair election. Election monitors have also criticized the election process. The Asian Network for Free Elections commented on the environment being tilted to benefit the junta, and the confused vote-counting process that created mistrust. The People Network for Elections in Thailand (P-NET) released a statement that the election was not free and fair. They cited prevalent and rampant cases of vote-buying in the North, Northeast, and Central regions. P-NET blamed the Election Commission for turning a blind eye to many of these violations. P-NET also stated that many local government officials used their authority to give an advantage to certain parties since this election had no volunteer observers.

Problems with the election also included issues with overseas voting, where poorly designed envelope labels led to mailed ballots being rejected or mis-delivered by postal services, and information pamphlets contained unclear or incorrect information. On election day, it became apparent that 1,500 ballots from New Zealand were misplaced during air cargo transfer and could not be delivered to counting centres in time to be considered valid.

== Results ==
=== Announcement ===
Partial preliminary results showed Pheu Thai and Palang Pracharath close in the two leading positions, followed by Future Forward. The results were a major upset for the Democrat Party, which came in fourth place, and Abhisit promptly resigned as party leader on election night, after it became certain the party had won fewer than 100 seats.

The Election Commission originally scheduled a press conference at 20:00 on election day, which would announce unofficial preliminary results at 95% of the vote counted. However, this was postponed until 21:30, and the EC chairman only announced several voter statistics. He said unofficial results would not be announced until the following day.

The Election Commission announced the unofficial results of 350 constituencies on Tuesday 26 and released full unofficial results in a press conference on Thursday 28. However, the figures contained many discrepancies, and led to further confusion. Party list seats would not be announced until the Election Commission officially endorsed the results, which was expected to happen near the deadline of 9 May, after the coronation of King Vajiralongkorn. Following the announcements, political parties began talks to form a coalition government. The Pheu Thai, Future Forward, Thai Liberal, Puea Chat, Prachachart, Thai People Power and New Economics parties announced an alliance at a press conference on 27 March. Despite Pheu Thai winning the most seats, Palang Pracharath also claimed it was entitled to form government, as it won more votes.

Due to the ambiguous way the election law was written concerning overhang seats, calculations by the media based on different interpretations of the law initially led to different sets of election results being reported. Before the elections, the Election Commission calculated that each allocated party-list seat should represent more than 70,000 votes. Although the media's interpretation discounted all parties that received fewer than the minimum number of votes per seat, the official calculations rounded up the figures for some of these parties, leading several of them to win one seat. This method reduced the popular vote threshold to as low as 35,000 votes, which cost the Future Forward Party seats. The official calculations were widely questioned, and the Election Commission, heavily criticized for not making its calculation methods public, deferred the matter to the Constitutional Court on 11 April. The Constitutional Court dismissed the request, and in a separate ruling ruled that the election law did not contradict the constitution.

=== Official results ===
The Election Commission announced official results for 349 constituency seats on 7 May, and for the party list seats on 8 May. Pheu Thai won the most constituencies at 136 seats. Palang Pracharath, which received the most votes, came in second, with 115 seats. Future Forward, Democrat and Bhumjaithai received 80, 52 and 51 seats, respectively. The result for one constituency in Chiang Mai Province was pending a by-election following disqualification of the leading candidate. The by-election was won by Future Forward, and recalculation of the party-list seats with the new popular vote figures awarded the Democrats and Palang Pracharath one new seat each, while the Thairaktham Party lost its only MP.

The Pheu Thai and Future Forward parties contested the calculation formula adopted by the ECT, as it resulted in Future Forward receiving seven fewer seats than expected from their alternative interpretation of the law, and their alliance securing 245 instead of 255 seats, just short of a majority. As such, they appeared unlikely to be able to form a government. The results also favoured several small parties which one seat each, who were expected to join a Palang Pracharath-led coalition. The new house convened on 24 May, and Prayut was voted prime minister by MPs from the 19-party coalition and all senators in a joint session on 5 June.

Party	Votes	%	Seats		
Party	Votes	%	FPTP	List	Total
Palang Pracharat Party	8,433,137	23.34	97	19	116
Pheu Thai Party	7,920,630	21.92	136	0	136
Future Forward Party	6,265,950	17.34	31	50	81
Democrat Party	3,947,726	10.92	33	20	53
Bhumjaithai Party	3,732,883	10.33	39	12	51
Thai Liberal Party	826,530	2.29	0	10	10
Chartthaipattana Party	782,031	2.16	6	4	10
New Economics Party	485,664	1.34	0	6	6
Prachachart Party	485,436	1.34	6	1	7
Puea Chat Party	419,393	1.16	0	5	5
Action Coalition for Thailand	416,324	1.15	1	4	5
Chart Pattana Party	252,044	0.70	1	2	3
Thai Local Power Party	213,129	0.59	0	3	3
Thai Forest Conservation Party	136,597	0.38	0	2	2
Thai People Power Party	81,733	0.23	0	1	1
Thai Nation Power Party	73,871	0.20	0	1	1
People Progressive Party	69,417	0.19	0	1	1
Palang Thai Rak Thai Party	60,840	0.17	0	1	1
Thai Civilized Party	60,421	0.17	0	1	1
Prachaniyom Party	56,617	0.16	0	1	1
Thai Teachers for People Party	56,339	0.16	0	1	1
Thai People Justice Party	47,848	0.13	0	1	1
People Reform Party	45,508	0.13	0	1	1
Thai Citizens Power Party	44,766	0.12	0	1	1
New Democracy Party	39,792	0.11	0	1	1
New Palangdharma Party	35,533	0.10	0	1	1
Thairaktham Party	33,748	0.09	0	0	0
Puea Pandin Party	31,307	0.09	0	0	0
New Alternative Party	29,607	0.08	0	0	0
Paradonphab Party	27,799	0.08	0	0	0
Democratic Force Party	26,617	0.07	0	0	0
Pheu Khon Thai Party	26,598	0.07	0	0	0
Thai Power Builds the Nation Party	23,059	0.06	0	0	0
Green Party	22,662	0.06	0	0	0
Land of Dharma Party	21,463	0.06	0	0	0
Mahachon Party	17,867	0.05	0	0	0
Social Power Party	17,683	0.05	0	0	0
The Farmer Network of Thailand Party	17,664	0.05	0	0	0
Thaen Khun Phaendin Party	17,112	0.05	0	0	0
Siam Development Party	16,839	0.05	0	0	0
Phuea Tham Party	15,365	0.04	0	0	0
Ruam Jai Thai Party	13,457	0.04	0	0	0
Klong Thai Party	12,946	0.04	0	0	0
Phung Luang Party	12,576	0.03	0	0	0
Thai Network Party	12,268	0.03	0	0	0
Thai Citizen Party	11,839	0.03	0	0	0
Thai Population Party	11,043	0.03	0	0	0
Thai Ethnic Party	9,757	0.03	0	0	0
Palang Thai Rak Chart Party	9,685	0.03	0	0	0
Power of Faith Party	9,561	0.03	0	0	0
New Aspiration Party	9,074	0.03	0	0	0
Phuea Thai Pattana Party	8,095	0.02	0	0	0
Thinkakhao Party	6,799	0.02	0	0	0
Thai Teacher Power Party	6,398	0.02	0	0	0
Thai Morality Party	5,942	0.02	0	0	0
Glang Party	5,447	0.02	0	0	0
Thai Social Democratic Party	5,334	0.01	0	0	0
Commoners' Party	5,321	0.01	0	0	0
Foundational Party	4,786	0.01	0	0	0
Powerful Love Party	4,624	0.01	0	0	0
Palang Pandinthong Party	4,568	0.01	0	0	0
Thai Rung Rueng Party	4,237	0.01	0	0	0
Bhumphalangkasettrakonthai Party	3,535	0.01	0	0	0
Rak Thong Thin Thai	3,254	0.01	0	0	0
Thai Power Labour Party	2,951	0.01	0	0	0
Commoner Party of Thailand	2,353	0.01	0	0	0
Thai Dee Power Party	2,536	0.01	0	0	0
Cooperative Power Party	2,343	0.01	0	0	0
Phue Cheevitmai Party	1,595	0.00	0	0	0
Thailand Development Party	1,079	0.00	0	0	0
Phue Sahagon Thai Party	905	0.00	0	0	0
People Vote Party	791	0.00	0	0	0
Thai Rubber Party	610	0.00	0	0	0
Democracy for People Party	562	0.00	0	0	0
Raks Tham	446	0.00	0	0	0
Kasikornthai Party	183	0.00	0	0	0
Thai Future Party	198	0.00	0	0	0
None of the above	605,392	1.68	–	–	–
Total	36,138,039	100.00	350	150	500
Valid votes	36,138,039	94.43			
Invalid/blank votes	2,130,327	5.57			
Total votes	38,268,366	100.00			
Registered voters/turnout	51,239,638	74.69			
Source: Election Commission

=== Results by province ===
Province	Total seats	Seats won									
Province	Total seats	PTP	PPRP	FFP	Dem	BJT	CP	PCC	ACT	CPN	Others
Amnat Charoen	2	2									
Ang Thong	1					1					
Bangkok	30	9	12	9							
Bueng Kan	2	2									
Buriram	8					8					
Chachoengsao	4		2	2							
Chai Nat	2		2								
Chaiyaphum	6	4	2								
Chanthaburi	3			3							
Chiang Mai	9	8		1							
Chiang Rai	7	5		2							
Chonburi	8		5	3							
Chumphon	3				2				1		
Kalasin	5	5									
Kamphaeng Phet	4		4								
Kanchanaburi	5		4			1					
Khon Kaen	10	8	1	1							
Krabi	2				1	1					
Lampang	4	4									
Lamphun	2	2									
Loei	3	2				1					
Lopburi	4	1	1			2					
Mae Hong Son	1		1								
Maha Sarakham	5	5									
Mukdahan	2	2									
Nakhon Nayok	1	1									
Nakhon Pathom	5		1	2	1		1				
Nakhon Phanom	4	3				1					
Nakhon Ratchasima	14	4	6			3				1	
Nakhon Sawan	6	1	4			1					
Nakhon Si Thammarat	8		3		5						
Nan	3	3									
Narathiwat	4		2					2			
Nong Bua Lamphu	3	3									
Nong Khai	3	3									
Nonthaburi	6	5	1								
Pathum Thani	6	4		1		1					
Pattani	4				1	1		2			
Phang Nga	1				1						
Phatthalung	3				1	2					
Phayao	3	1	2								
Phetchabun	5		5								
Phetchaburi	3		3								
Phichit	3		3								
Phitsanulok	5	2	2	1							
Phra Nakhon Si Ayutthaya	4	2				2					
Phrae	2			2							
Phuket	2		2								
Prachinburi	3					3					
Prachuap Khiri Khan	3	1			2						
Ranong	1					1					
Ratchaburi	5		3		1	1					
Rayong	4		1		3						
Roi Et	7	6					1				
Sa Kaeo	3		3								
Sakon Nakhon	6	6									
Samut Prakan	7		6	1							
Samut Sakhon	3		1	2							
Samut Songkhram	1				1						
Saraburi	3	1	2								
Satun	2					2					
Sing Buri	1		1								
Sisaket	8	6				2					
Songkhla	8		4		3	1					
Sukhothai	3		2			1					
Suphan Buri	4						4				
Surat Thani	6				6						
Surin	7	5	1			1					
Tak	3		2		1						
Trang	3		1		2						
Trat	1			1							
Ubon Ratchathani	10	7	1		2						
Udon Thani	8	8									
Uthai Thani	2					2					
Uttaradit	2	2									
Yala	3		1					2			
Yasothon	3	3									
Partylist	150		19	50	20	12	4	1	4	2	38
Total	500	136	116	81	53	51	10	7	5	3	38
Source: Electoral Commission
