= Thanathorn Juangroongruangkit =

Thai politician and businessman (born 1978)

- ธนาธร จึงรุ่งเรืองกิจ
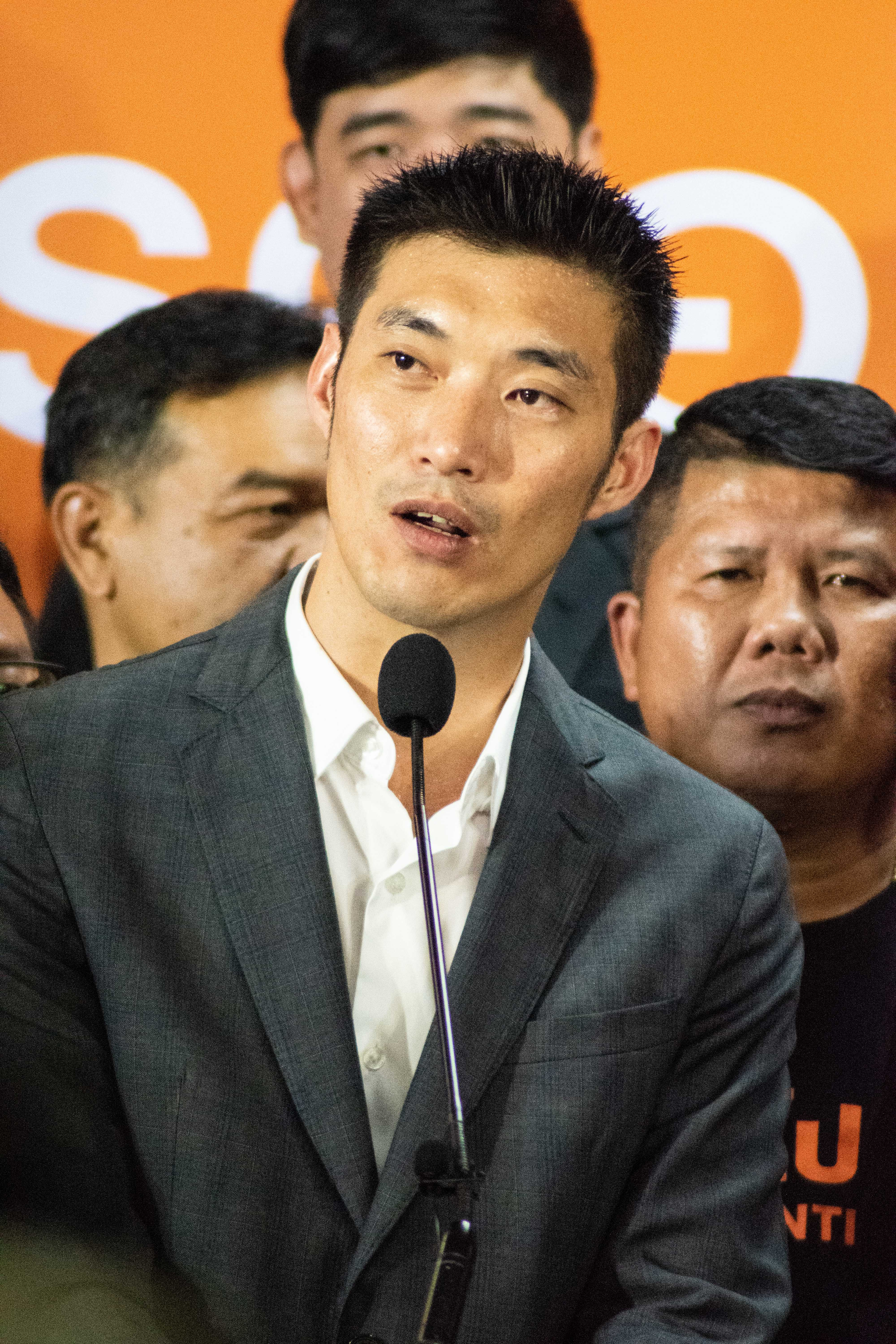
- Thanathorn in 2020

Leader of the Future Forward Party
- In office 27 May 2018 – 21 February 2020
- Preceded by: Position established
- Succeeded by: Pita Limjaroenrat (Move Forward Party; de facto)

Member of the House of Representatives
- In office 24 March 2019 – 20 November 2019
- Constituency: Party-list

Personal details
- Born: 25 November 1978 (age 47) Bangkok, Thailand
- Party: Future Forward (2018–2020)
- Other political affiliations: Progressive Movement (since 2020)
- Spouse: Rawiphan Daengthongdi
- Children: 4
- Parents: Pattana Juangroongruangkit (father); Somporn Juangroongruangkit (mother)
- Relatives: Suriya Juangroongruangkit (uncle); Pongkawin Juangroongruangkit (cousin)
- Education: Thammasat University; University of Nottingham; Chulalongkorn University; New York University; Hong Kong University of Science and Technology; University of St. Gallen
- Occupation: Politician; businessman
- Nickname: Ek (เอก)

Thanathorn Juangroongruangkit (Thai: ธนาธร จึงรุ่งเรืองกิจ, RTGS: Thanathon Chuengrungrueangkit [tʰā.nāː.tʰɔ̄ːn tɕɯ̄ŋ.rûŋ.rɯ̄aŋ.kìt]; born 25 November 1978) is a Thai businessman and former politician who served as the leader of the Future Forward Party from 2018 to 2020. From 2002 to 2018, he was the vice president of the Thai Summit Group, Thailand's largest auto parts manufacturer.

In March 2018, Thanathorn co-founded the Future Forward Party and was unanimously elected as the party's leader during its first public meeting in May 2018.

== Early life and family ==
Thanathorn Juangroongruangkit was born and raised in Bangkok, within a Thai Chinese family that traces its roots back to Fujian province. His Chinese surname is Zhuang (莊) in Mandarin Chinese. His family is notable in the Thai business landscape, particularly through their involvement with the Thai Summit Group. This company, founded by Thanathorn's father, Pattana Juangroongruangkit, in 1977, later came under the leadership of his mother, Somporn Juangroongruangkit, following Pattana's death in 2002. Additionally, the Juangroongruangkit family has significant holdings in Matichon Publishing Group, a major Thai media conglomerate.

In the context of Thanathorn's entry into politics, he made significant professional changes to avoid potential conflicts of interest. He stepped down from his positions at the Matichon board and the Thai Summit Group. Concurrently, his mother, Somporn, divested all her shares in Matichon.

Another notable member of the Juangroongruangkit family in Thai politics is Thanathorn's uncle, Suriya Juangroongruangkit. Suriya has a history of political involvement, having served as Thailand's Minister of Transport from 2002 to 2005. He is a key figure in the Palang Pracharat Party, a leading pro-junta political party in Thailand and a major component of the current government coalition.

== Education ==
Thanathorn began his education at the Triam Udom Suksa School in Bangkok. Following high school, he pursued higher education, earning a joint-honours Bachelor of Engineering (B.Eng.) in mechanical engineering from Thammasat University and the University of Nottingham. His time at university was marked by significant involvement in student leadership, serving as the President of the Thammasat University Students Union in 1999 and subsequently as the Deputy Secretary-General of the Students Federation of Thailand.

Thanathorn's academic pursuits extended beyond engineering. He obtained three master's degrees, reflecting his growing interest in broader social and economic issues. These degrees include a Master's in Political Economy from Chulalongkorn University, a joint Master's in Global Finance from Stern School of Business at New York University and The Hong Kong University of Science and Technology, and a Master's in International Business Law from the University of St. Gallen.

Parallel to his academic journey, Thanathorn was actively engaged in social and economic reform activities in Thailand. He was involved with charities and NGOs such as Friends of the People and the Assembly of the Poor. Notably, he advocated for the rights of villagers in Ubon Ratchathani Province affected by the Pak Mun Dam, campaigning for their land and compensation rights.

Thanathorn's involvement in student movements during his academic years was a subject of concern for his family. In various interviews, it has been revealed that Thanathorn experienced disagreements with his uncle, Suriya Juangroongruangkit, from a young age. A key point of contention between them centered around the Trans Thai-Malaysia Gas Pipeline Project. Thanathorn's perspective on this project reflects his broader critique of government practices, which he associates with issues of accountability and what he describes as crony capitalism. He has linked these concerns to broader economic challenges faced by Thailand, notably referencing the 1997 economic crisis.

== Business career ==
Thanathorn initially aspired to a career with the United Nations and received an offer to work as a development worker in Algeria. However, his career path took a significant turn due to family circumstances. In 2002, following the diagnosis of his father, Pattana Juangroongruangkit, with cancer and his subsequent passing, Thanathorn returned to Thailand. At the age of 23, he assumed the leadership role of the Thai Summit Group, a major enterprise founded by his father.

During his tenure as the head of Thai Summit Group, the company saw substantial growth. From 2001 to 2017, its revenues increased from 16 billion baht to 80 billion baht. Thanathorn was instrumental in expanding the company’s global reach, establishing manufacturing facilities in seven countries and employing over 16,000 people worldwide.

A notable achievement under Thanathorn's leadership was striking a deal in 2005 with the American auto manufacturer Tesla. This agreement involved supplying 500,000 cars per year, marking a significant milestone for Thai Summit Group with sales totaling 7.9 billion baht and profits of 5.98 billion baht. This deal led to the establishment of factories in the United States. Further expanding the company's global footprint, in 2009, Thanathorn guided Thai Summit Group in acquiring Ogihara, a leading Japanese mould maker.

Thanathorn's professional involvement extended into various significant roles within Thailand's industrial sector. From 2008 to 2012, he served as the President of the Federation of Thai Industry's Nakhon Nayok Chapter, holding this position for two consecutive terms. In addition to this role, Thanathorn was distinguished as the youngest person to be elected as the Secretary-General of the Thai Auto Parts Manufacturers Association, a position he held from 2007 to 2010. His involvement in industry was further underscored by his membership in the Industrial Cluster Development Board of Thailand's National Science and Technology Development Agency.

In a significant career shift, after spending 17 years as Executive Vice-President of the Thai Summit Group, Thanathorn stepped down from this role in May 2018. This decision followed his election as the leader of the Future Forward Party, marking his transition from business to a full-time career in politics.

== Political career ==
On 15 March 2018, Thanatorn, together with Piyabutr Saengkanokkul, a former constitutional law professor at Thammasat University, and other individuals with similar views, initiated the establishment of a new political party, named Future Forward (Thai: อนาคตใหม่), registering it with the Election Commission of Thailand. At the party's inaugural public meeting in May 2018, Thanathorn was chosen as the party leader.

Thanathorn's vision for Future Forward includes restoring civilian government and reducing military influence in Thai politics, enhancing political accountability, promoting equitable wealth distribution, and establishing a social welfare system that respects human dignity. He also advocates for increased decentralization of power.

To maintain its independence and transparency, Future Forward has adopted a funding model that depends solely on contributions from its members and supporters. The party aims to gather 350 million baht from its members and the public to support its campaign in the 2019 general election.

Thanathorn, with his business background, youthful image, and political perspectives, has attracted international media attention, drawing comparisons to leaders like French President Emmanuel Macron and Canadian Prime Minister Justin Trudeau. In Thailand, media often labels him as the "billionaire commoner," highlighting his role in challenging the country's social class system. Additionally, he has gained a unique following among young female supporters, who humorously refer to him as "Daddy."

Regarding legal matters, Thanathorn, along with Jaruwan Sarankate and Klaikong Vaidhyakarn, senior members of his party, faced charges under the Computer Crime Act. This stemmed from a complaint by a member of the National Council for Peace and Order (NCPO) regarding their Facebook Live broadcast on 29 June 2018, allegedly disseminating false information or content detrimental to national stability.

The trio was summoned to the Technology Crime Suppression Division (TCSD) on 24 August 2018, to hear the charges. They requested a postponement to 17 September 2018, due to short notice and prior commitments. Thanathorn had previously attended a session on 31 July 2018, as a witness but chose not to comment on the allegations at that time.

Thanathorn was elected as a Member of Parliament in the 2019 elections. Subsequently, the Election Commission raised concerns about his eligibility, alleging that he owned shares in a media company, V-Luck Media, at the time of his MP candidacy registration. This ownership, if proven, would contravene election laws and could lead to his disqualification. Thanathorn contested these allegations, asserting that he had transferred all his shares before registering as a candidate.

On 23 May 2019, just before the new parliament's opening, the Constitutional Court agreed to review the case brought against Thanathorn by the Election Commission. In a vote of 8–1, the Court decided to suspend Thanathorn's status as an MP until a final verdict was reached. He was allowed to participate in the opening ceremony and take his oath but was then required to leave.

During this period, Thanathorn was proposed as a prime ministerial candidate by a coalition of parties opposed to the military junta. However, he was defeated by the incumbent prime minister and former coup leader, Prayut Chan-o-cha. In November of the same year, the Constitutional Court ruled against Thanathorn, officially disqualifying him from his MP status.

In addition, Thanathorn's declaration of assets to the National Anti-Corruption Commission revealed that he possessed assets totaling 5.6 billion baht, making him the wealthiest member of the Thai parliament at that time.

In October 2019, Thanathorn met with Hong Kong activist Joshua Wong at the Open Future Festival. Wong tweeted a picture of the two together, writing, "Under the hard-line authoritarian suppression, we stand in solidarity." The Chinese embassy in Bangkok issued a statement referring to the incident as irresponsible. Thanathorn issued a statement denying any relationship with Wong and stating that he supports China playing a bigger role both regionally and globally.

== Progressive Movement ==
Thanathorn founded the Progressive Movement with Piyabutr Saengkanokkul after their party dissolved. In January 2021, he was charged with lèse-majesté after criticizing Prayut Chan-o-cha government mismanagement of COVID-19 vaccination by relying too much on AstraZeneca vaccine which Siam Bioscience, owned by the King, supplies the most. On 18 January 2021, the Royal Thai Police charged him for defaming the government through a live stream on Facebook. Later, Puttipong Punnakanta filed the charge through Technology Crime Suppression Division and the court ordered taking the video down.

Later in August 2021, Thanathorn faced two more lèse-majesté charges for the same act.

== Personal life ==
Thanathorn's nickname is Ek (Thai: เอก).

He is married to Rawiphan Daengthongdi, they have four children together. Angered by the 2006 coup, Thanathorn gave his son the nickname Demo (Thai: เดโม่), from the Greek root demos ('people').

In his free time, Thanathorn enjoys outdoor activities such as hiking, trekking, climbing, marathons, kayaking, cycling, diving and mountaineering. He has participated in various extreme sports competitions, including the Tor des Géants and the Sahara Marathon. Thanathorn was the first Asian to complete the 560 km self-supported foot race above the Arctic Circle. Asked about his media diet, Thanathorn says he reads foreign newspapers like The New York Times, The Economist, Financial Times, and Thai newspapers like Matichon and Krungthep Turakij (Bangkok Business). He is a big fan of esports and games such as Minecraft and Arena of Valor, which he cites as one of the tools he uses to connect with his children.

In an interview about his style and grooming, Thanathorn revealed that he doesn't use any facial or hair products, moisturizers, or cosmetics. He also revealed that he wears generic white shirts and pleated khakis as a daily uniform. The only investment he makes into his wardrobe is for his climbing and running clothing for his outdoor hobbies.

Party political offices
New political party	Leader of the Future Forward Party; 2018–2020	Succeeded by Pita Limjaroenrat as Leader of the Move Forward Party
New title	President of the Progressive Movement; 2020–present	Incumbent
