= Chulabhorn Royal Academy =

Thai research and academic institute

Coordinates: 13.884°N 100.570°E

- ราชวิทยาลัยจุฬาภรณ์
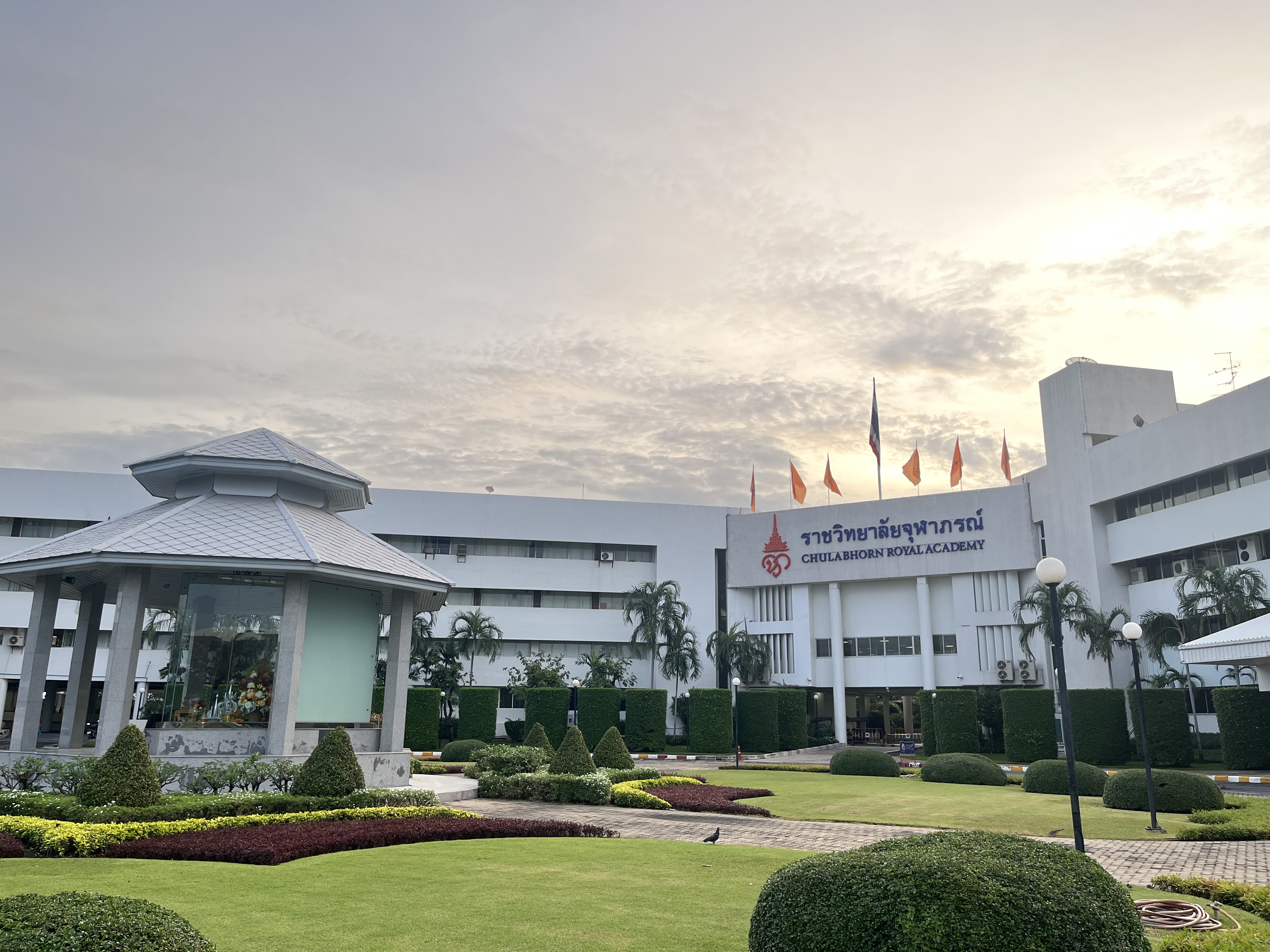
- Type: Public
- Established: 19 January 2016
- Founders: Princess Chulabhorn
- Affiliations: Chulabhorn Graduate Institute; HRH Princess Chulabhorn College of Medical Science; Chulabhorn Hospital
- Royal conferrer: Chulabhorn Walailak, Princess Srisavangavadhana
- Location: Lak Si, Bangkok, Thailand
- Colors: Reddish orange
- Website: www.cra.ac.th

Chulabhorn Royal Academy (Thai: ราชวิทยาลัยจุฬาภรณ์) is an advanced research and academic institute to provide academic and professional education in science, technology, environment, medicine, and public health. Its objectives are to research, create, process, apply, promote, disseminate, develop, educate, and produce high-level personnel to create a body of knowledge to be a center of excellence in science and technology to the public providing assistance to the needy and disaster victims including promoting morals and ethics and preserving arts and culture. The royal academy named after Princess Chulabhorn.

== History ==
Chulabhorn Royal Academy was formed as an umbrella organization for three previously existing institutions under the Chulabhorn Foundation: Chulabhorn Research Institute, Chulabhorn Graduate Institute and HRH Princess Chulabhorn College of Medical Science. The academy is a higher education institution under the supervision of the government by Her Royal Highness Princess Chulabhorn, there was a royal decision to merge these three agencies and bestowed the name "Chulabhorn Royal Academy". It was established on 19 January 2016 in accordance with the Chulabhorn Royal College Act B.E. 2559, which the National Legislative Assembly voted on the agenda item on 29 October 2015 and voted on agenda on 3 December 2015 with 151-0 votes by announcing it in the Government Gazette dated 19 January 2016.

The academy starting to accept students of the first generation of the Royal College in the academic year 2017.

On 27 December 2017, it was promulgated The Chulabhorn Royal College Act (No. 2) B.E. 2560 (2017), which stipulates the separation of the Chulabhorn Research Institute from the Royal Academy and remains under the Chulabhorn Foundation as before. Therefore, the committee of the Royal College Council from the proportion of Chulabhorn Research Institute was also eliminated also determine that there may be a position President of the Royal Academy to obtain advice in all matters in accordance with the objectives of the Royal Academy and the President of the Royal College will appoint Vice President of the Royal Academy to perform duties as assigned.

== Departments ==
- Royal Academy Office
- Chulabhorn Graduate Institute
- HRH Princess Chulabhorn College of Medical Science
- Chulabhorn Hospital
