= Siam Bioscience =

Thai drug manufacturer

- Native name: สยามไบโอไซเอนซ์
- Company type: Private
- Industry: Biopharmaceutical; Pharmaceutical; Medical devices
- Founded: 17 August 2009
- Founder: Bhumibol Adulyadej
- Key people: Apiporn Pasawat (CEO); Songpon Deechongkit (Managing director)
- Revenue: ▲THB302 million (2020); THB158 million (2019)
- Owner: Vajiralongkorn
- Number of employees: 125 (2012)
- Subsidiaries: Inno Biocosmed
- Website: siambioscience.com

Siam Bioscience Company, Ltd. (Thai: สยามไบโอไซเอนซ์) is a Thai drug manufacturer, owned by King Vajiralongkorn.

In 2009, the project started with a partnership between CPB Equity, subsidiary of Crown Property Bureau in the reign of King Bhumibol Adulyadej, and a medical human resource and pharmaceutical technology supporter's Mahidol University. Investing around 2,000 million baht, the project proposes were bio-pharmaceutical product research and producing Thai drugs to reduce the dependence on imported drugs.

The first chair of the board and the key man driving the project was Sanoh Unakul, one of Siam Cement Group's directors. Apiporn Pasawat, former managing director of SCG Chemical, and Songpon Deechongkit, have been CEO and managing director from the beginning.

In 2012, Thailand Board of Investment subsidized Siam Bioscience for 427.50 million baht.

== Business partnership ==
=== Cuba's Cimab ===
In 2017, the company was in a 70/30 joint venture with Cuba's Abinis (Cimab) from Center of Molecular Immunology to produce and export licensed drugs. Abinis received special tax privileges such as a ten-year tax reduction with help from Thailand Board of Investment. The plant construction started in 2011 and completed in 2013, it is able to produce biopharmaceutical for anaemia treating and reducing side effects of chemo.

== Controversy ==
=== Lèse-majesté suit ===
In January 2021, Thanathorn Juangroongruangkit was charged with lèse-majesté, a strict defamation law, after criticizing Prayut Chan-o-cha government mismanagement of COVID-19 vaccination by relying too much on AstraZeneca vaccine through Siam Bioscience, the Royal Thai Police charged him for publishing Jan 18 Facebook Live stream. Later, Puttipong Punnakanta filed the charge through Technology Crime Suppression Division and the court ordered taking the video down.

Later in August 2021, Thanathorn Juangroongruangkit faced two more lèse-majesté charges for the same act.

=== Subsidy ===
Aside from BOI subsidy earlier in 2012, in October 2020, Prayut Chan-o-cha led's government allocated 600 million baht budget to Siam Bioscience through the National Vaccine Institute to develop capacity to produce AstraZeneca vaccine. Thanathorn Juangroongruangkit criticized a transparency in the subsidy for for-profit company.
