= Yan (surname 严) =

Chinese family name

严 / 嚴
- Romanization: Yan, Yen, Yim, Ngiam
- Gender: Masculine
- Language: Chinese

Origin
- Derivation: Zhuang
- Meaning: "strict"

In 2008, the surname "严 (嚴)", pinyin Yán, or Yim in Cantonese was estimated to be the 92nd most common surname in the People's Republic of China, shared by around 2.2 million citizens. It is the 27th name on the Hundred Family Surnames poem. This surname has various origins. In the state of Chu, the branch of Xiong (熊) of the Zhuang surname (莊) was renamed to Yan (嚴). The Zhuang (莊) family changed their names to Yan (嚴) upon the ascension of the Han Ming Emperor, whose personal name was Zhuang, owing to the naming taboo.

In the state of Qin, many families with the surname Ying (嬴) were renamed Yan (嚴). Citizens of the State of Yan (嚴國) in Ancient China were surnamed Yan (嚴). During the Sixteen Kingdoms, the royal family of Xianbei were given the surname Yan (嚴). Some ethnic minority groups in China, including the Xibe people, Yi people and Tu people, also use the surname Yan (嚴)

== Origins ==
People with the surname Zhuang (莊) changed it to 嚴 (both meaning ‘solemnity’) during the reign of Emperor Ming of Han, whose personal name was Liu Zhuang (劉莊), due to a naming taboo as the surname Zhuang (莊) happened to be the given name of the emperor. Later some descendants kept the surname, whereas others changed back to the original.

== Notable people ==
- Yan Yan (嚴顔; (fl. 211–214), Chinese military general and politician of the late Han dynasty
- Yim Wing-chun (嚴詠春), Chinese legendary character, often cited in Wing Chun legends as the first master of the martial art bearing her name
- Yan Fu (嚴復; 1854–1921), Chinese scholar
- Yen Chia-lin (嚴家麟; 1890–1967), founder of Scouting in China
- Yan Jici (严济慈; 1901–1996), Chinese physicist and politician
- Yen Chia-kan (嚴家淦; 1905–1993), President of the Republic of China (1975–1978)
- Yan Jinxuan (嚴金萱; 1924–2014), Chinese composer of The White-Haired Girl
- Yan Shunkai (严顺开; 1937–2017), Chinese comedian, actor and director
- Ngiam Tong Dow (严崇涛; 1937–2020), Singaporean civil servant
- Yan Jiaqi (严家其; born 1942), Chinese political scientist and dissident
- Yan Junqi (严隽琪; born 1946), Vice chairwoman of the standing committee of the National People's Congress of China
- Yan Mingyong (严明勇; born 1985) Chinese gymnast
- Yen Ming (嚴明; born 1949), Minister of National Defense of the Republic of China (2013–2015)
- Yen Teh-fa (嚴德發; born 1952), Minister of National Defense of the Republic of China
- Yim Ho (嚴浩; born 1952) Hong Kong film directors, leader of Hong Kong New Wave
- Yen Tzung-ta (嚴宗大; born 1956), Deputy Governor of the Central Bank of the Republic of China
- Geling Yan (嚴歌苓; born 1958), Chinese-American writer
- Yan Pei-Ming (严培明; born 1960), Chinese-born French painter
- Yan Hong (严红; born 1967), Chinese swimmer
- Yan Jing (born 1970), Chinese fencer
- Yan Jiankui (严剑葵; born 1976), Chinese sprinter
- Gerald Giam (严燕松; born 1977), Singaporean politician
- Yan Yikuan (严屹宽; born 1979), Chinese actor and singer
- Yan Huilian (严会莲; born 1983), Chinese archer
- Sophia Yan (嚴倩君; born 1986), American classical pianist
- Yan Shimin (严诗敏; born 1987), Chinese rower
- Yen-j (嚴爵; born 1988), Taiwanese singer and actor
- Yan Haoxiang (严浩翔; born 2004), Chinese singer, member of Teens in Times
- Ngiam Tee Liang (嚴世良), former Singaporean Member of Parliament
