= Akanat Promphan =

Thai politician (born 1986)

- เอกนัฏ พร้อมพันธุ์
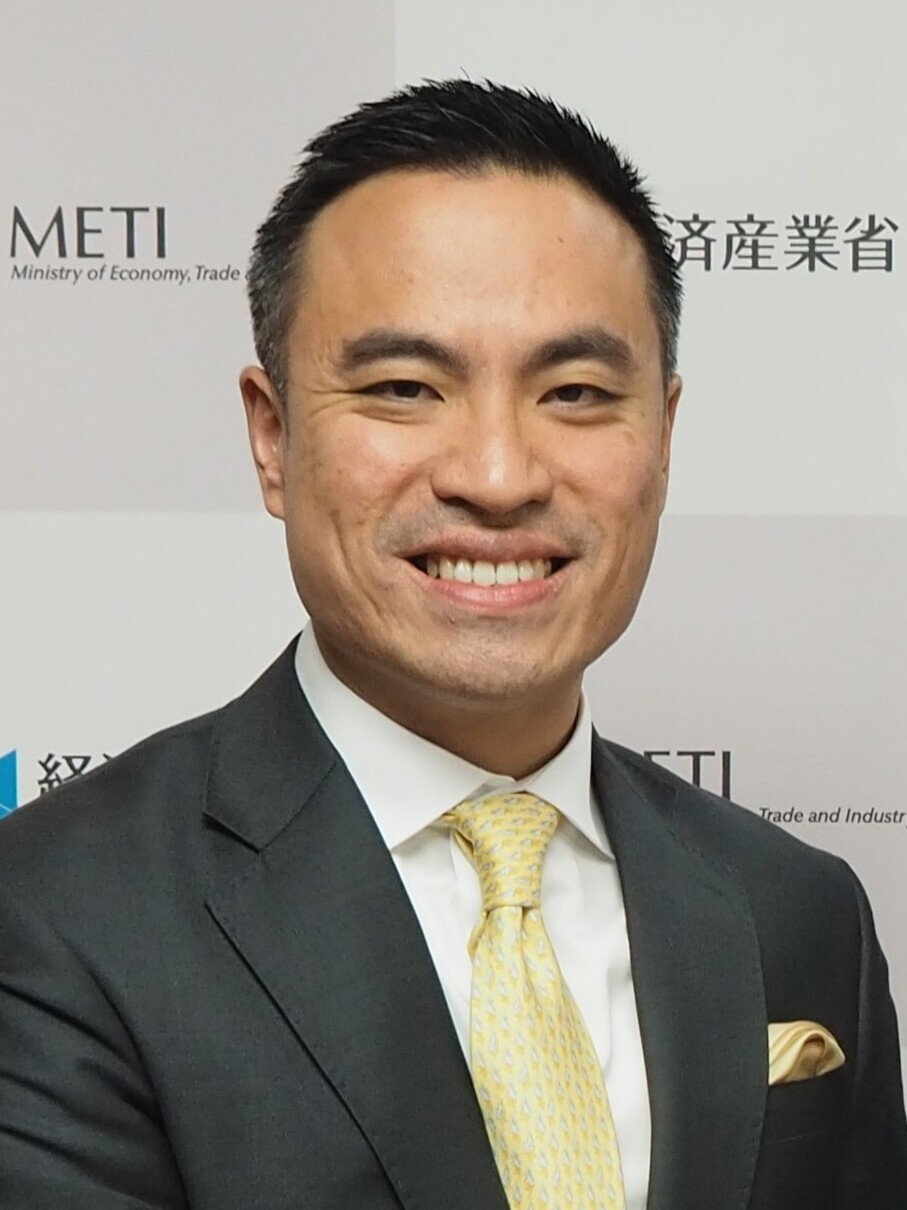
- Akanat in November, 2024

Minister of Energy
- Incumbent
- Assumed office 30 March 2026
- Prime Minister: Anutin Charnvirakul
- Preceded by: Atthaphon Rerkpiboon

Minister of Industry
- In office 3 September 2024 – 19 September 2025
- Prime Minister: Paetongtarn Shinawatra
- Preceded by: Pimpatra Wichaikul
- Succeeded by: Thanakorn Wangboonkongchana

Secretary-General of the United Thai Nation Party
- In office 3 August 2022 – 16 September 2025
- Preceded by: Thandee Hongrattanauthai

Member of the House of Representatives
- In office 3 July 2011 – 8 December 2013
- Succeeded by: Supaporn Kongwutpanya
- Constituency: Bangkok 29

Personal details
- Born: January 12, 1986 (age 40) Bangkok, Thailand
- Party: Bhumjaithai (since 2025)
- Other political affiliations: Democrat (2011–2022); United Thai Nation (2022–2024)
- Relatives: Suthep Thaugsuban (stepfather)
- Education: St John's College, Oxford (BS, MS)

Akanat Promphan (Thai: เอกนัฏ พร้อมพันธุ์, RTGS: Ekanat Phromphan; born 12 January 1986) is a Thai politician and Democrat MP who served as Private Secretary to his stepfather Deputy Prime Minister Suthep Thaugsuban in the government of Abhisit Vejjajiva and as a spokesman for the People's Democratic Reform Committee protest movement.

== Early life and education ==
Akanat was born on 12 January 1986 in Bangkok as the second son of Pornthep Techapaibul and Srisakul Promphan, who later divorced. His father, Pornthep, once served as a deputy minister in the government of Chuan Leekpai, while his mother, sister of veteran Democrat politician Niphon Promphan, eventually remarried Suthep Thaugsuban, who served as Deputy Prime Minister of Thailand from 2008 to 2011.

He attended Saint Gabriel's College until he was 10, after which he studied in Australia and then at Charterhouse School in the United Kingdom. He read engineering, economics and management at St John's College, Oxford, receiving a bachelor's and a master's degree.

== Political career ==
Akanat entered politics shortly after graduating from Oxford, becoming private secretary to his stepfather, Suthep, then Deputy Prime Minister. Akanat was subsequently elected a Democrat Member of Parliament representing Bangkok in the 2011 general elections. At 25, he was the youngest MP elected that year. He and other members of his family received acclaim for his work during the 2011 Thailand floods, where he delivered food and other supplies to aid kitchens in Bangkok and Southern Thailand.

In June 2013 he resigned from Parliament, to help lead the People's Democratic Reform Committee dedicated to ousting the government of Yingluck Shinawatra, and served as the organisation's spokesman. After the removal of the Yingluck government and coup d'état in 2014, Akanat joined Suthep in being ordained as a monk for a year. In 2022 Akanat resigned from Democrat Party and became secretary-general of the United Thai Nation Party on 3 August 2022.
