= Pimpatra Wichaikul =

Thai politician

Pimpatra Wichaikul MPCh MVM
- พิมพ์ภัทรา วิชัยกุล
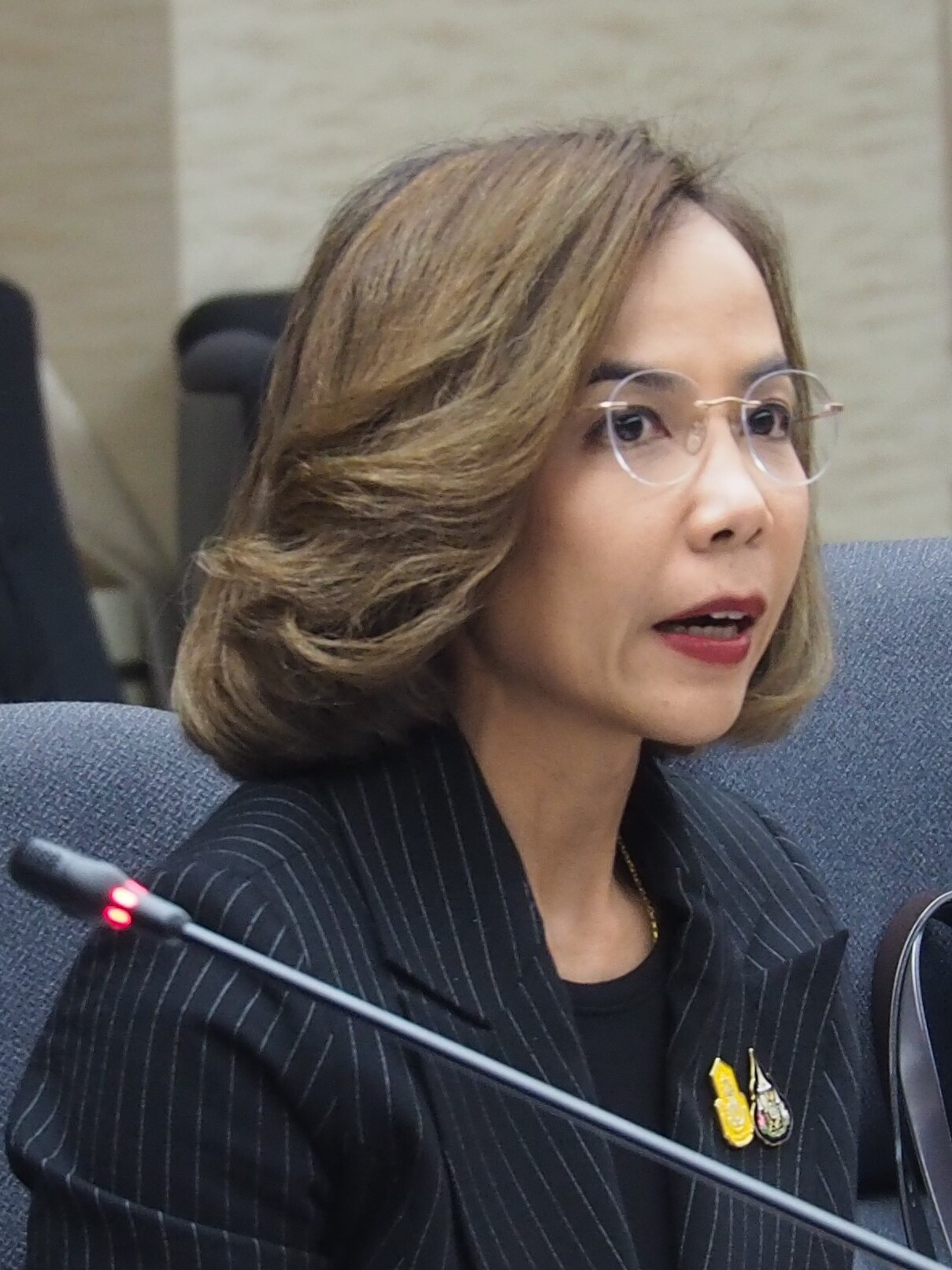
- Pimpatra Wichaikul in 2024

Minister of Industry
- In office 1 September 2023 – 3 September 2024
- Prime Minister: Srettha Thavisin
- Preceded by: Suriya Juangroongruangkit
- Succeeded by: Akanat Promphan

Member of the House of Representatives for Nakhon Si Thammarat
- Incumbent
- Assumed office 24 March 2019
- In office 23 May 2007 – 9 December 2013

Personal details
- Born: 19 November 1979 (age 46) Sichon, Nakhon Si Thammarat, Thailand
- Party: Democrat Party (2007–2023); United Thai Nation Party (since 2023)
- Education: King Mongkut's University of Technology North Bangkok (BS); Ramkhamhaeng University (MA)
- Occupation: Politician

Pimpatra Wichaikul (Thai: พิมพ์ภัทรา วิชัยกุล, RTGS: Phimphathra Wichaikun) is a Thai politician. She served as Minister of Industry in the cabinet of Prime Minister Srettha Thavisin.
