= COVID-19 vaccination in Thailand =

Plan to immunize against COVID-19

- Date: 28 February 2021 – present (5 years, 5 months, 4 weeks and 1 day)
- Location: Thailand
- Cause: COVID-19 pandemic in Thailand
- Participants: 112,279,694 total doses (20 Jan 2022)
- Website: ddc.moph.go.th/vaccine-covid19/ dashboard-vaccine.moph.go.th

Total number of people who have received vaccinations in Thailand as of 8 Nov 2021
* Percentage of population with right to medical treatment
1. Unvaccinated population: ~23.003 million people (34.2%)
2. Population who have received only one dose of a two-dose vaccine: 9,745,446 (14.5%)
3. Population who are fully vaccinated: 31,857,851 (47.4%)
4. Population who received first booster dose: 2,572,899 (3.83%)
5. Population who received second booster dose: 2,809 (0.00%)
Vaccines delivered per pharmaceutical company as of 8 Nov
1. Oxford–AstraZeneca: ~36.606 million doses (43.8%)
2. CoronaVac: ~25.508 million doses (30.5%)
3. Sinopharm BIBP: ~13.231 million doses (15.8%)
4. Pfizer–BioNTech: ~8.199 million doses (9.80%)
5. Moderna: ~0.07 million doses (0.01%)
6. Janssen: ~0.007 million doses (0.01%)

COVID-19 vaccination in Thailand is an ongoing mass immunization in response to the ongoing pandemic in the country.

== Background ==
In November 2020, the authorities ordered 26 million doses of vaccine from AstraZeneca, which reported 70% overall efficacy. It requires 2 doses of vaccine per person, so the quantity ordered would only cover 13 million people. Prayut cabinet later approved budget for ordering 35 million additional doses in January 2021. Siam Bioscience, a company owned by King Vajiralongkorn, will received technological transfer for co-investment. The authorities also imported 2 million doses of vaccine from Sinovac, a Chinese company which Thai conglomerate Charoen Pokphand invested in, during February to April 2021.

Likewise, the Thai government also stepped up its attempt to produce its homegrown vaccines amidst criticism, with "ChulaCov19" and set to begin trials in May 2021. Phase I testing of the NDV-HXP-S vaccine began at Mahidol University in March 2021.

In July 2021, the National Vaccine Institute apologized for slow vaccine deployment. Meanwhile, the government's prior commitment to secure 61 million doses of AstraZeneca vaccine became doubted after a leaked document showed that the company would deliver no more than 60 percent of the number planned per month. A virology advisor also endorsed an untested plan to mix AstraZeneca and Sinovac vaccines. There was already a report of death from the practice, but health professionals said they have to rule out other causes first.

== Vaccines used ==
=== National Vaccines ===
Free Vaccines which are provided under the policies of the Ministry of Public Health.

Vaccine name	Doses ordered (excluding donation)	Doses arrived (including donation)	Approval (EUA)	First Arrival	Deployment	Ref
(United Kingdom) (Sweden) Oxford–AstraZeneca	61 million	25.5 million	20 January 2021	24 February 2021	28 February 2021	
(China) CoronaVac	31.1 million	26.52 million	22 January 2021	24 February 2021	28 February 2021	
(United States) (Belgium) Janssen	5 million	unknown	25 March 2021	Late June	26 July 2021	
(United States) (Germany) Pfizer–BioNTech	30 million	3.5 million	24 June 2021	30 July 2021	5 Aug 2021	

=== Optional Vaccines ===
Vaccines that are not in the policies of the Ministry of Public Health. Orders are made through government organizations but the cost of vaccination will not be supported by the government. However, people who get vaccinated by these vaccines are still counted in the national vaccination programme.

Vaccine name	Distributor	Doses planned or ordered	Doses arrived	Approval (EUA)	First Arrival	Deployment	Ref
(United States) Moderna	Government Pharmaceutical Organization	5 million	0.5602 million	13 May 2021	1 Nov 2021	5 Nov 2021	
(United States) Moderna	Chulabhorn Royal Academy	8 million	Not yet	13 May 2021	Not yet	Not yet	
(China) Sinopharm BIBP (BBIBP-CorV)	Chulabhorn Royal Academy	15 million	15 million	28 May 2021	20 June 2021	25 June 2021	

=== Vaccines pending approval ===
- (Russia) Sputnik V
- (India) Covaxin

== Vaccination Procedures ==
Vaccination procedures used in Thailand.

First Dose	Second Dose	Third Dose	Fourth Dose	Dose Interval
(China) CoronaVac or (China) Sinopharm BIBP	(China) CoronaVac or (China) Sinopharm BIBP	(United Kingdom) (Sweden) Oxford–AstraZeneca or (United States) (Germany) Pfizer–BioNTech or (United States) Moderna	(United Kingdom) (Sweden) Oxford–AstraZeneca or (United States) (Germany) Pfizer–BioNTech or (United States) Moderna	2–4 weeks (2nd); 4 weeks (3rd); 3 month (4th)
(China) CoronaVac or (China) Sinopharm BIBP	(United Kingdom) (Sweden) Oxford–AstraZeneca	(United Kingdom) (Sweden) Oxford–AstraZeneca or (United States) (Germany) Pfizer–BioNTech or (United States) Moderna	(United Kingdom) (Sweden) Oxford–AstraZeneca or (United States) (Germany) Pfizer–BioNTech or (United States) Moderna	3–4 weeks (2nd); 3 month (3rd and 4th)
(China) CoronaVac or (China) Sinopharm BIBP	(United States) (Germany) Pfizer–BioNTech or (United States) Moderna	(United States) (Germany) Pfizer–BioNTech or (United States) Moderna	(United States) (Germany) Pfizer–BioNTech or (United States) Moderna	3–4 weeks (2nd); 6 month (3rd); 3 month (4th)
(United Kingdom) (Sweden) Oxford–AstraZeneca	(United Kingdom) (Sweden) Oxford–AstraZeneca	(United States) (Germany) Pfizer–BioNTech or (United States) Moderna	(United States) (Germany) Pfizer–BioNTech or (United States) Moderna	10–16 weeks (2nd); 3 month (3rd and 4th)
(United Kingdom) (Sweden) Oxford–AstraZeneca	(United States) (Germany) Pfizer–BioNTech or (United States) Moderna	(United States) (Germany) Pfizer–BioNTech or (United States) Moderna	(United States) (Germany) Pfizer–BioNTech or (United States) Moderna	4–12 weeks (2nd); 6 month (3rd); 3 month (4th)
(United States) (Germany) Pfizer–BioNTech or (United States) Moderna	(United States) (Germany) Pfizer–BioNTech or (United States) Moderna	(United States) (Germany) Pfizer–BioNTech or (United States) Moderna	(United States) (Germany) Pfizer–BioNTech or (United States) Moderna	4–12 weeks (2nd); 6 month (3rd); 3 month (4th)

=== Notes ===
- MOPH suspended the procedures of the first two doses of Sinovac vaccine on 12 July 2021 due to inefficient immunization against Delta variant. People who received the Sinovac vaccine for the first dose and had an appointment date for second dose after suspension, the second doses will be switched to other vaccines automatically.
- MOPH suspended the procedures of the first two doses of AstraZeneca on 11 September 2021 due to long dose interval process which takes time for creating immunization. People who received the first dose of AstraZeneca vaccine before the suspension will continue to receive the same AstraZeneca vaccine for second dose. However, People who haven't received the first dose before the suspension will have to start with other procedures instead.
- Excluding the procedure of Jannsen vaccine which is currently imported and managed by the Embassy of France in Thailand under the approval of MOPH, only French nationals living in Thailand are eligible to receive this vaccine for now.

== Vaccines in trial stage ==
Vaccine	Type (technology)	Progress
(Thailand) (United States) NDV-HXP-S (HXP-GPOVac); Mahidol University, University of Texas at Austin,	Newcastle disease virus (NDV) viral vector (expressing the spike protein of SARS-CoV-2, with or without the adjuvant CpG 1018) or Inactivated	Phase I–II (460); Randomized, placebo-controlled, observer-blind. Mar 2021 – May 2022; Thailand
(Thailand) ChulaCov19; Chulalongkorn University	RNA	Phase I–II (96); Dose-finding Study. Jan–Mar 2021, Thailand
(Thailand) Baiya SARS-CoV-2 Vax 1 Baiya Phytopharm Co Ltd.	Plant-based Subunit (RBD-Fc + adjuvant)	Phase I (96); Randomized, open-label, dose-finding. Sep–Dec 2021, Thailand
(Australia) (Thailand) COVIGEN; Bionet Asia, Technovalia, University of Sydney	DNA	Phase I (150); Double-blind, dose-ranging, randomised, placebo-controlled. Feb 2021 – Jun 2022, Australia, Thailand
