= Chaikasem Nitisiri =

Thai politician and lawyer (born 1948)

- ชัยเกษม นิติสิริ
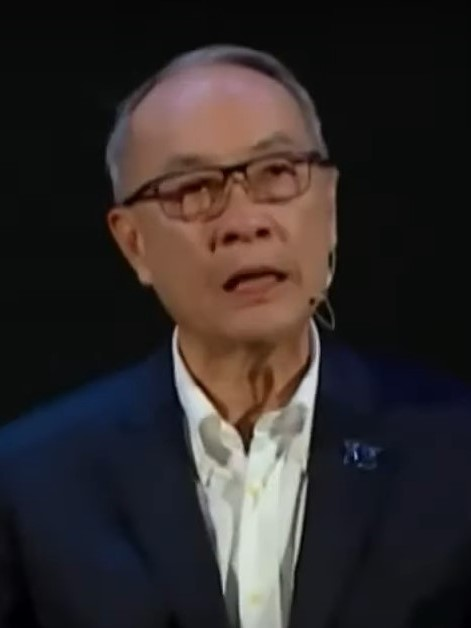
- Chaikasem in 2022

Minister of Justice
- In office 30 June 2013 – 22 May 2014
- Prime Minister: Yingluck Shinawatra; Niwatthamrong Boonsongpaisan (acting)
- Preceded by: Pracha Promnok
- Succeeded by: Paiboon Khumchaya

Attorney General of Thailand
- In office 1 October 2007 – 30 September 2009
- Monarch: Bhumibol Adulyadej
- Preceded by: Phachara Yuttithamdamrong
- Succeeded by: Chulasingh Vasantasingh

Member of the House of Representatives
- In office 14 May 2023 – 9 October 2023

Personal details
- Born: 26 August 1948 (age 77) Thon Buri, Bangkok, Thailand
- Party: Pheu Thai (since 2011)
- Spouse: Amporn Nitisiri
- Education: Assumption College
- Alma mater: Chulalongkorn University (AB); Columbia University (LLM)
- Occupation: Attorney; academic; politician
- Awards: Order of the Crown of Thailand (1994); Order of the White Elephant (1999)

Chaikasem Nitisiri MPCh MVM (Thai: ชัยเกษม นิติสิริ; born 26 August 1948) is a Thai lawyer, politician and professor. He served as the Minister of Justice in the Yingluck Shinawatra cabinet until his dismissal in the 2014 coup d'état. Chaikasem is a Pheu Thai member and was one of the 2019 and 2023 prime ministerial candidates.

== Early life and education ==
Chaikasem started his primary and secondary education at Assumption College, and then transferred to Triam Udom Suksa School. He received his bachelor's degree from faculty of political science, Chulalongkorn University. With the government's scholarship, he continued his studies at Columbia University and received a master's degree in law (LL.M.). Chikasem was also admitted to the bar by the Thai Bar Association and started his career as an assistant public prosecutor. He did steadily thrive in his legal career path until his retirement as the Attorney General of Thailand and also adjunct professor to the faculty of law, Chulalongkorn University.

== Career ==
Chaikasem started his career as an assistant prosecutor in the Litigation Division for the Samut Sakhon province until he was promoted to be the Director-General of the Prosecutor for Intellectual Property and International Trade Litigation in Phuket province.

On 30 July 2009, Chaikasem was appointed by royal command as a professor at Chulalongkorn University in the Faculty of Law. Between 2011 and 2012, Chaikasem held several positions in the Yingluck Shinawatra government, such as chairman of Securities and Exchange Commission, Department of Special Investigation, and PTT Exploration and Production.

Chaikasem contested in a Parliamentary vote for the 32nd Prime Minister of Thailand as a candidate for the Pheu Thai party against Anutin Charnvirakul, losing out to him by 152 to 311 seats in Parliament.

== Honours, decorations and awards ==
- 1999 – Knight Grand Cordon (Special Class) of the Most Exalted Order of the White Elephant
- 1994 – Knight Grand Cordon (Special Class) of the Most Noble Order of the Crown of Thailand
- 1999 - Chakrabarti Mala Medal - Medal for Long Service and Good Conduct (Civil)
