= Thai Raksa Chart Party =

Political party in Thailand (2009–2019)

Thai Raksa Chart Party พรรคไทยรักษาชาติ Thais Save the Nation Party
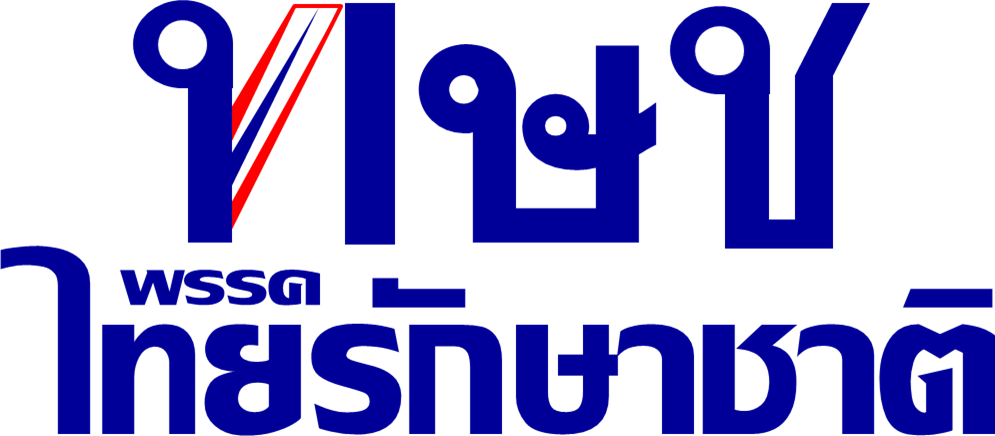
- Leader: Preechapol Pongpanich
- Secretary-General: Mitti Tiyapairat
- Founded: 27 July 2009
- Dissolved: 7 March 2019
- Split from: Pheu Thai Party
- Headquarters: 99/385, Chaeng Watthana Road, Thung Song Hong, Lak Si, Bangkok
- Ideology: Progressivism; Economic liberalism Populism; Antimilitarism
- Political position: Centre to centre-left
- Colours: Red, white, dark blue
- Slogan: โลกก้าวไกล ไทยต้องก้าวทัน; Keeping Thailand step up with global process

Website
- tsn.or.th

The Thai Raksa Chart Party (Thai: พรรคไทยรักษาชาติ, RTGS: Phak Thai Raksa Chat, pronounced [pʰák tʰāj rák.sǎː t͡ɕʰâːt]), officially known in English as the Thai Save the Nation Party, was a Thai political party.

== History ==
The party was established in 2009 under the name Rath Thai Party. The party underwent a series of name changes throughout its existence, renaming itself to Thai Ruamphalang Party in 2010, before adopting its current name per the decision of the party's assembly at its convention in 2018. It had been observed that the party served as a "backup party" for Pheu Thai Party, as several former Pheu Thai MPs and ministers had confirmed to join the party for the 2019 Thai general election.

The party's inaugural convention was held on 7 November 2018 at the Rama Gardens Hotel in Bangkok. The party debuted its new name and logo design similar to the Pheu Thai Party's logo, but with the "ท" letter featuring a circle in lieu of a triangle at the upper left. First Lieutenant Preechapol Phongpanich and Mitti Tiyapairat were elected to become the party's leader and secretary-general respectively.

=== Dissolution ===
On 8 February 2019, the party announced the nomination of Princess Ubol Ratana as its sole candidate for prime minister in the upcoming election. This unprecedented move was widely regarded as a "surprise" and a "political earthquake" as it marked the first time that a member of the Thai royal family would become a candidate in electoral politics.

However, King Vajiralongkorn issued a statement on the same day, prohibiting Princess Ubol Ratana from entering politics, stating that despite relinquishing her official status as royalty to marry a United States citizen in the past, she still has maintained close ties with the royal family and worked under the name of the monarchy, and it was therefore considered against tradition, norms and culture to bring members of the royal family into politics.

Following the nomination, the Election Commission of Thailand submitted a request to the Constitutional Court on 13 February 2019 to consider a dissolution of the party. It was dissolved with immediate effect on 7 March by order of the Constitutional Court and its leaders banned from politics for a decade, citing customary law.
