= Suriya Juangroongruangkit =

Thai politician (born 1954)

Suriya Juangroongruangkit MPCh MWM
- สุริยะ จึงรุ่งเรืองกิจ
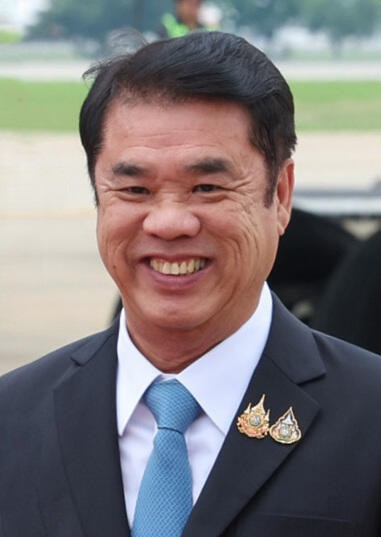
- Suriya in 2025

Acting Prime Minister of Thailand
- In office 1 July 2025 – 3 July 2025
- Monarch: Vajiralongkorn
- Preceded by: Paetongtarn Shinawatra (Note: Shinawatra was suspended from her position as Prime Minister 1 July – 29 August 2025.)
- Succeeded by: Phumtham Wechayachai (acting)

Deputy Prime Minister of Thailand
- In office 27 April 2024 – 19 September 2025
- Prime Minister: Srettha Thavisin; Paetongtarn Shinawatra; Himself (acting); Phumtham Wechayachai (acting)

Minister of Agriculture and Cooperatives
- Incumbent
- Assumed office 30 March 2026
- Prime Minister: Anutin Charnvirakul
- Preceded by: Thamanat Prompow

Minister of Transport
- In office 1 September 2023 – 19 September 2025
- Prime Minister: Srettha Thavisin; Paetongtarn Shinawatra; Himself (acting); Phumtham Wechayachai (acting)
- Preceded by: Saksayam Chidchob
- Succeeded by: Phipat Ratchakitprakarn
- In office 3 October 2002 – 2 August 2005
- Prime Minister: Thaksin Shinawatra
- Preceded by: Wan Muhamad Noor Matha
- Succeeded by: Pongsak Ruktapongpisal

Minister of Industry
- In office 10 July 2019 – 17 March 2023
- Prime Minister: Prayut Chan-o-cha
- Preceded by: Uttama Savanayana
- Succeeded by: Pimphattra Wichaikul
- In office 2 August 2005 – 19 September 2006
- Prime Minister: Thaksin Shinawatra
- Preceded by: Watana Muangsook
- Succeeded by: Kosit Panpiemras
- In office 17 February 2001 – 3 October 2002
- Prime Minister: Thaksin Shinawatra
- Preceded by: Suwat Liptapanlop
- Succeeded by: Somsak Thepsuthin

Deputy Minister of Industry
- In office 5 October 1998 – 29 June 1999
- Prime Minister: Chuan Leekpai

Member of the House of Representatives
- In office 8 February 2026 – 29 April 2026
- Constituency: Party-list
- In office 14 May 2023 – 19 January 2024
- Constituency: Party-list
- In office 24 March 2019 – 17 March 2023
- Constituency: Party-list

Personal details
- Born: 10 December 1954 (age 71) Bangkok, Thailand
- Party: Pheu Thai (2013–2018; 2023–present)
- Other political affiliations: Social Action (1976–1999); Thai Rak Thai (1999–2007); Bhumjaithai (2009–2013); Palang Pracharath (2019–2023)
- Spouse: Surisa Jungrungreangkit
- Relatives: Pongkawin (nephew); Thanathorn (nephew); Somporn (sister-in-law)
- Education: UC Berkeley
- Profession: Politician

Suriya Juangroongruangkit (Thai: สุริยะ จึงรุ่งเรืองกิจ; RTGS: Suriya Chuengrungrueangkit; born 10 December 1954) is a Thai politician who has served as the deputy prime minister of Thailand and Minister of Transport since April 2024 and September 2023 respectively. He served his first term as the deputy prime minister from August 2005 to September 2006 and as the Minister of Transport from October 2002 to August 2005. He previously also served as the minister of industry for multiple times, Deputy Minister of Industry and Member of the House of Representatives. He is a member of the Pheu Thai Party and was one of the leaders of the Palang Pracharath Party as well as the Thai Rak Thai party. He served as the acting Prime Minister from 1 July 2025 to 3 July 2025.

== Early life and career ==
Suriya Juangroongruangkit was born on 10 December 1954 in Bangkok within a Thai Chinese family that traces its roots back to Fujian province. His Chinese surname is Zhuang (莊) in Mandarin Chinese. He attended Triam Udom Suksa School, Phaya Thai, and studied at the University of California, Berkeley, where he received a bachelor of science in manufacturing engineering in 1978. After working for various car companies in Thailand, he was appointed transport minister on 3 October 2002. On 11 March 2005 he started his second term in office.

He is the uncle of Thanathorn Juangroongruangkit.

== Political career ==
When Suriya was a member of the Thai Rak Thai, he served as the secretary-general of the party. As part of the Palang Pracharath party, he was an influential member of the Sam Mitr faction. Under Prime Minister Prayut Chan-o-cha, he served as the Minister of Industry.

At the beginning of 2023, there were rumours that both Suriya and Somsak Thepsuthin would defect from the Palang Pracharath party to Pheu Thai. They then informed the party's leader Prawit Wongsuwon of their intention to remain and run in the House of Representative elections. However, on 23 March 2023, Suriya and Somsak, along with Suirya's wife Anongwan joined the Pheu Thai party.

Paetongtarn Shinawatra was suspended from office by the Constitutional Court on 1 July 2025, and Suriya took over as Thailand's acting prime minister. Due to a cabinet reshuffle prearranged by Paetongtarn when she was prime minister, Suriya relinquished the acting premiership on 3 July to interior minister Phumtham Wechayachai, who had been appointed deputy prime minister.

== Royal decorations ==
Suriya has received the following royal decorations in the Honours System of Thailand:

- 2002 - Knight Grand Cordon of the Most Exalted Order of the White Elephant
- 2001 - Knight Grand Cordon of The Most Noble Order of the Crown of Thailand
- 1973 - Serving Free People Medal

== Notes ==
Political offices
| Preceded by Paetongtarn Shinawatra | Prime Minister of Thailand; Acting; 2025 | Succeeded by Phumtham Wechayachai as Acting Prime Minister |
