= Nahathai Thewphaingarm =

Thai businesswoman, educator, and politician

- ณหทัย ทิวไผ่งาม

Personal details
- Born: 24 June 1970 (age 56) Bangkok, Thailand
- Party: Pheu Thai Party
- Education: Chulalongkorn University; University of Wisconsin–Madison (PhD)
- Occupation: Businesswoman; Teacher; Educator; Politician
- Known for: Vice Minister for the Office of The Deputy Prime Minister(Prasert Chandraruangthong)

Nahathai Thewphaingarm (Thai: ณหทัย ทิวไผ่งาม) is a Thai businesswoman, educator, and politician serving as an Assistant Minister in the Paetongtarn Shinawatra government. She previously held the position of Assistant Minister at the Office of the Prime Minister during the Srettha Thavisin administration. She was a Member of the Parliament of Thailand (2005–2006) and a vice spokesman of the Thai government (2001–2002). On November 5, 2024, she was a vice minister for the Office of the Deputy Prime Minister Prasert Chandraruangthong.

== Career ==
Dr.Nahathai Thewphaingarm was on the board of an English program at the Thewphaingarm School called TSEP, a family run school in Bangkok. She earned her PhD in education from University of Wisconsin. She was a politician and member of the Parliament. She belonged to the Thai Rak Thai Party. She left the party just before it was banned. She was the Chief of Counsellor of Thewphaingarm school and Thewphaingarm school English Program Bangkok, Thailand. In the 2019 Thai general election, Thewphaingarm returned to the national political. She was later appointed as a member of the Executive Committee of the Pheu Thai Party. On September 26, 2023, during a Cabinet meeting, the meeting approved her appointment as Vice Minister for the Office of the Prime Minister (October 4, 2024 - August 14, 2024). Her term ended following the conclusion of the administration of former Prime Minister Srettha Thavisin.Subsequently, on November 5, 2024, the Cabinet approved the appointment of Assistant Ministers in the administration of Prime Minister Paetongtarn Shinawatra. She was appointed as Assistant Minister at the Office of the Prime Minister, under the supervision of Deputy Prime Minister Prasert Chanthararuangthong.
