= Suthep Thaugsuban =

Thai politician (born 1949)

Suthep Thaugsuban MPCh MWM
- สุเทพ เทือกสุบรรณ
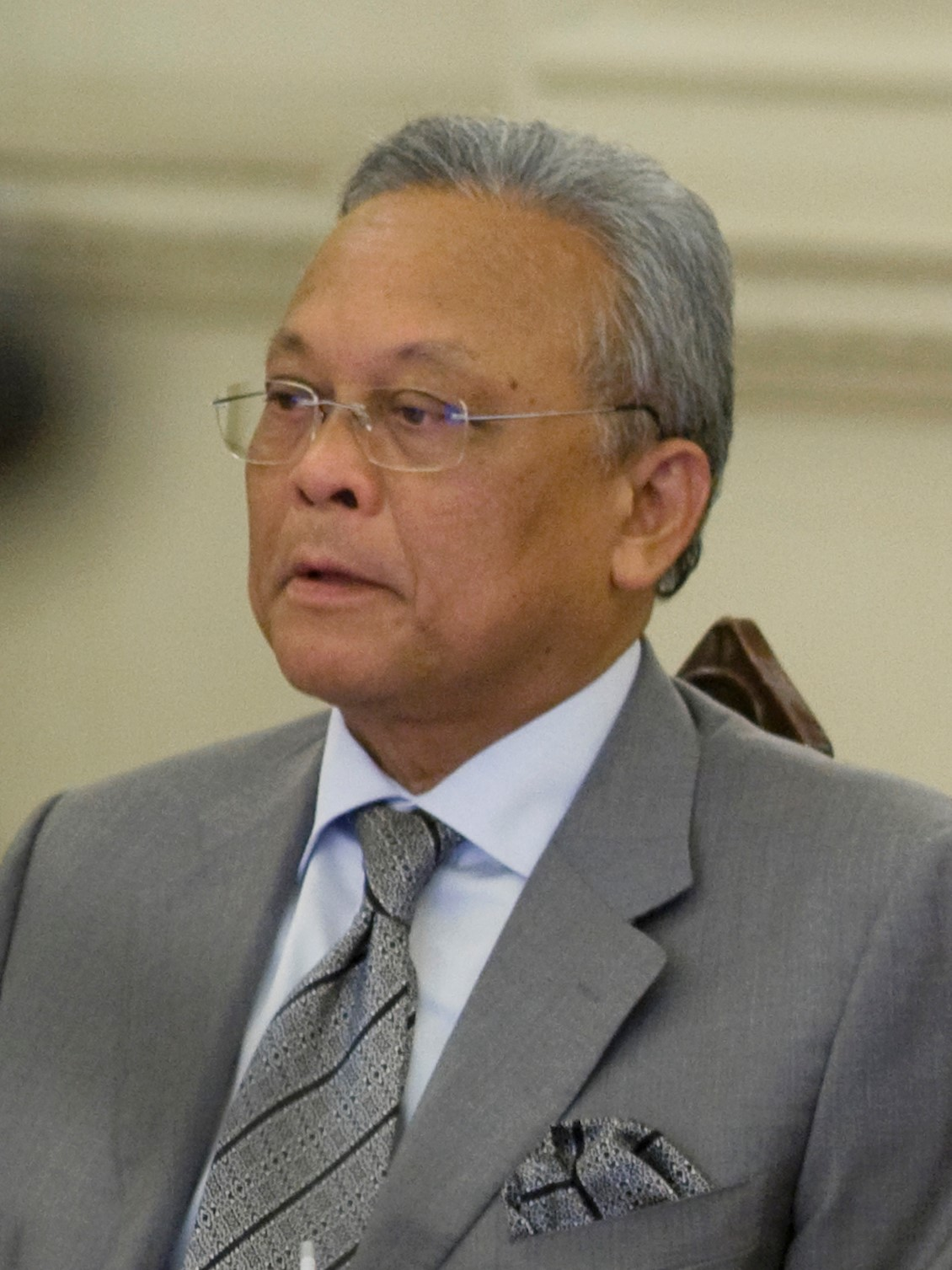
- Suthep in 2010

Deputy Prime Minister of Thailand
- In office 20 December 2008 – 9 August 2011
- Prime Minister: Abhisit Vejjajiva

Minister of Transport
- In office 14 November 1997 – 9 November 2000
- Prime Minister: Chuan Leekpai
- Preceded by: Suwat Liptapanlop
- Succeeded by: Wan Muhamad Noor Matha

Personal details
- Born: 7 July 1949 (age 77) Phunphin, Surat Thani, Siam
- Party: Action Coalition Party (since 2018)
- Other political affiliations: People's Democratic Reform Committee (2013–14); Democrat Party (1979–2013)
- Spouse: Chuthaporn Thaugsuban (m. 1978; died 1996)
- Domestic partner: Srisakul Promphan
- Children: 3
- Relatives: Akanat Promphan (stepson)
- Education: Chiang Mai University; Middle Tennessee State
- Profession: Politician

Suthep Thaugsuban (Thai: สุเทพ เทือกสุบรรณ, RTGS: Suthep Thueaksuban, pronounced [sù.tʰêːp tʰɯ̂ːak.sù.ban]; born 7 July 1949) is a Thai former politician and former Member of Parliament for Surat Thani province. Until 2011, he was secretary-general of the Democrat Party and a deputy prime minister under Abhisit Vejjajiva. He resigned his seat in Parliament in November 2013 to become the self-appointed secretary-general of the People's Democratic Reform Committee, which was conducting mass protests trying to unseat the government of Prime Minister Yingluck Shinawatra. After the military coup of May 22, 2014, Suthep was temporarily detained and placed under arrest by the new junta. He was released after four days, retired from politics, and entered Buddhist monastichood from July 2014 to July 2015. Since, he became the leader of the Muan Maha Prachachon for Reform Foundation (the People’s Democratic Reform Foundation) that backed the junta sponsored Thai constitutional referendum, which had been put to a national referendum on 7 August 2016.

He was released from prison on bail, later in February 2021, which stands in contrast to his court sentence (from 2021) still standing at a prison term of seven years.

== Background and education ==
Suthep was born in Tha Sathon, Phunphin District, Surat Thani Province in Southern Thailand. His father was the sub-district headman (kamnan) of Tambon Tha Sathon. Suthep studied Political Science at Chiang Mai University, before he went to the United States to do a master's degree at Middle Tennessee State University, which he completed in 1975. At the age of 26 he was elected sub-district headman of Tha Sathon, succeeding his father. Suthep and his family own a substantial share of Southern Thailand's oil palm plantations and shrimp farms. He is the stepfather of Akanat Promphan, Minister of Industry.

== Political career ==
In 1979, Suthep was elected Member of Parliament, representing Surat Thani province and the Democrat Party. This constituency is a stronghold of the party and he was re-elected in all following elections. From 1986 to 1988, he was deputy minister of agriculture in Prem Tinsulanonda's cabinet, from 1992 to 1994 he held the same position in Chuan Leekpai's first cabinet. When the Democrat Party returned to power in 1997, Suthep was appointed Minister of Transport and Communication, serving until 2001.

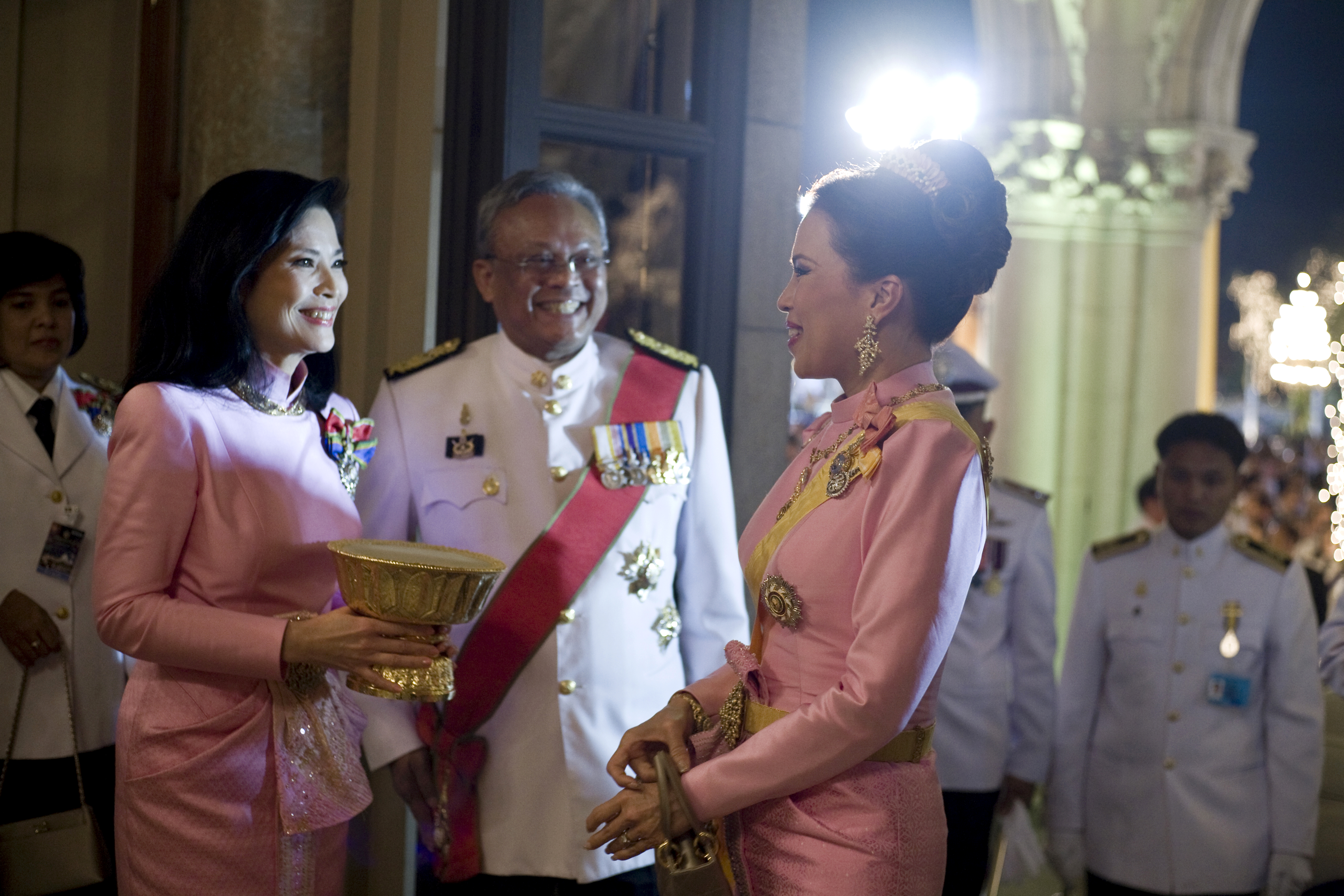
Suthep with his common-law wife Srisakul Promphan (left) and Princess Ubol Ratana (right), 2009

When Abhisit Vejjajiva became leader of the Democrats in 2005, he made Suthep secretary-general of the party. After Abhisit was appointed prime minister in December 2008, Suthep became deputy prime minister overseeing internal security matters. In the general election on 3 July 2011, the Democrats were defeated, receiving 34% of the votes in contrast to the Pheu Thai Party's 47%. In response, Suthep immediately stepped down as the party's secretary-general. When the government of Pheu Thai Party-leader Yingluck Shinawatra took office on 9 August 2011, his term as deputy prime minister ended.

== Corruption scandal, political and criminal offenses ==
As part of the Sor Por Kor 4-01 (สปก.4-01) land reform scheme, Suthep gave title deeds to 592 plots of land in Khao Sam Liam, Kamala and Nakkerd hills of Phuket province to 489 farmers. It was later found that members of 11 wealthy families in Phuket were among the recipients. Suthep addressed a huge crowd in his Surat Thani constituency a month before a no-confidence debate and called on his supporters to march on Bangkok in the hundreds of thousands to defend his reputation. The scandal led Prime Minister Chuan Leekpai of the Democrat Party to dissolve the House of Representatives in July 1995 in order to avoid the no-confidence debate. In subsequent elections, Thai Nation Party won a majority, leading to the downfall of Chuan Leekpai's Democrat Party-led government.

Wikileaks diplomatic cables from the US embassy revealed that many members of his own party have long complained of his corrupt and unethical behavior.

In 2009, Suthep was accused of violating the Constitution of Thailand by holding equity in a media firm that had received concessions from the government. Under the 1997 Constitution of Thailand, which Suthep had supported, Members of Parliament are banned from holding stakes in companies which have received government concessions. In July 2009, the Election Commission announced that it would seek a ruling by the Constitutional Court to disqualify Suthep. Suthep held a press conference a day later, announcing his decision to resign from Parliament. Suthep's resignation as an MP did not affect his status as a deputy prime minister and as a Cabinet member. If his case had been submitted to the Constitution Court, he would have been suspended from duty as deputy prime minister. He insisted his resignation was not a proof that he had done anything wrong but that he was worried about status as deputy prime minister.

After several Criminal court rulings that deaths and injuries sustained by Red-Shirt protesters during the political unrest in April and May 2010 were the direct result of orders to soldiers given by Suthep Thaugsuban, the director of the Resolution of the Emergency Situation (CRES), the Department of Special Investigation, public prosecutors and police agreed to file murder charges against him.

Suthep along with Abhisit was also found responsible by the Court for the assassination of Italian journalist Fabio Polenghi, who was covering the 2010 protests.

== Protest leader in the 2013–14 political crisis ==
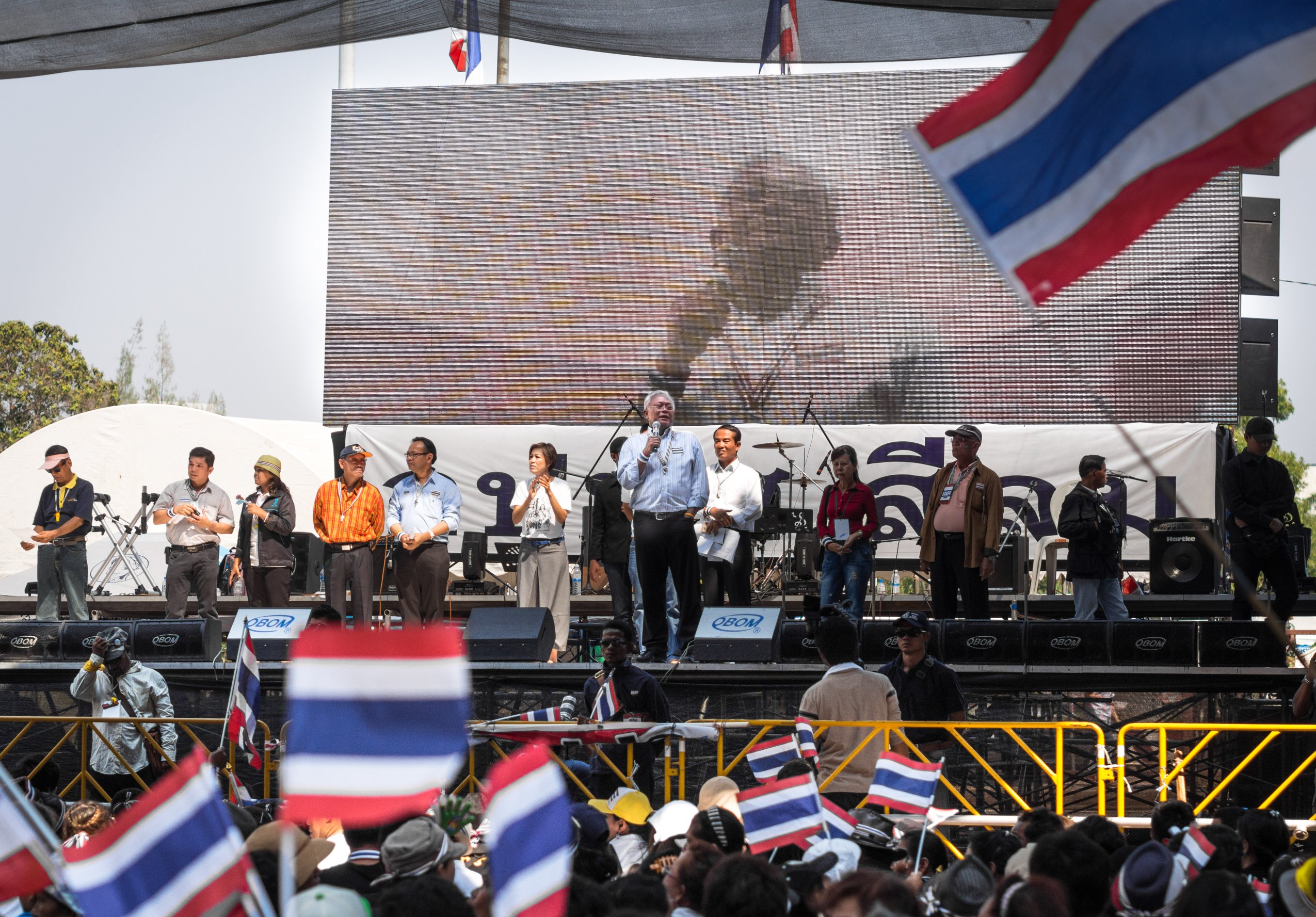
Suthep addressing a PDRC rally at Silom on 2 February 2014

Suthep was the most prominent leader of the anti-government protests that started in late October 2013, triggered by a government's proposal for an amnesty bill. On 11 December 2013, Suthep resigned his seat in parliament and quit the Democrat Party, to focus on leading the street protests. Even after the government abandoned the amnesty project, Suthep and his followers continued their protests, calling not only for the resignation of Prime Minister Yingluck Shinawatra which would trigger a snap election, but for a total disempowerment of her brother Thaksin Shinawatra and his allies. After 25 November 2013, Suthep took part in the seizure of government buildings. On the next day the criminal court issued an arrest warrant.

On 29 November 2013, Suthep named himself secretary-general of the People's Democratic Reform Committee (PDRC, or "People's Committee for Absolute Democracy With the King As Head of State"), an umbrella organisation of the protest movement. He strives for a replacement of the government, suspension of parliament, the appointment of a new head of government by the king, and the formation of an unelected "People's Council" to fundamentally reform the country's political system.

After the coup d'état of 22 May 2014 led by army chief Prayut Chan-o-cha, Suthep like other leaders of the two rivaling political camps was detained by the military for a few days. The prosecution charged him with insurrection but released him on bail terms. In July 2014 he was ordained to the Buddhist monkhood in Wat Tha Sai, Surat Thani. He took the monastic name of Prapakaro and took up abode at the Suan Mokkh meditation centre in Chaiya District (Surat Thani Province).

== The People's Democratic Reform Foundation ==
On the 30 July 2015 Suthep Thaugsuban led his former activist leaders to officially introduce the foundation of a charity group "the Great Mass of the People for Reform of Thailand" funded by donations from "Thai patriots" only which would cooperate with the military junta to achieve its reform peacefully without resorting to rallies or protests.

== See also ==
- Democrat Party (Thailand)
- Abhisit Vejjajiva
