= Pongkawin Jungrungruangkit =

Thai politician

- พงศ์กวิน จึงรุ่งเรืองกิจ
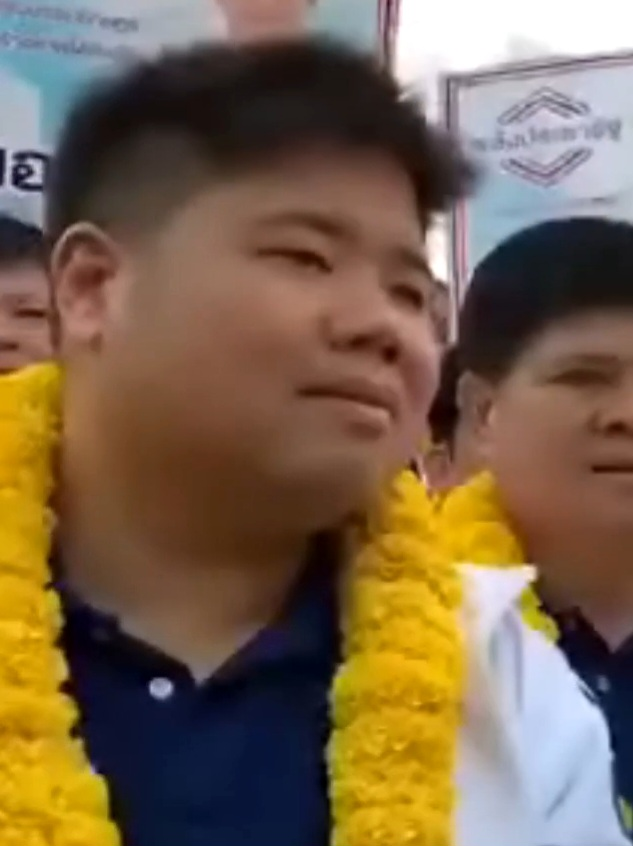
- Pongkawin in 2019

Minister of Labour
- In office 30 June 2025 – 19 September 2025
- Prime Minister: Paetongtarn Shinawatra
- Preceded by: Phipat Ratchakitprakarn

Pongkawin Jungrungruangkit (Thai: พงศ์กวิน จึงรุ่งเรืองกิจ, RTGS: Phongkawin Chuengrungrueangkit) is a Thai politician, serving as Minister of Labour since 2025. Pongkawin is the nephew of Suriya Juangroongruangkit, the Deputy Prime Minister of Thailand. He was born to a Thai Chinese family that traces its roots back to Fujian province. His Chinese surname is Zhuang (莊) in Mandarin Chinese.

== Career ==
=== Minister of Labour ===
On 4 July 2025, Pongkawin announced five central policies focusing on artificial intelligence training along with youth employment.
