= Somporn Juangroongruangkit =

Thai businesswoman

- สมพร จึงรุ่งเรืองกิจ
- Born: 1950 or 1951 (age 75–76); Bangkok, Thailand
- Occupation: Businesswoman
- Title: President and CEO, Thai Summit Group
- Spouse: Pattana Juangroongruangkit (died 2002)
- Children: 5, including Thanathorn
- Relatives: Suriya Juangroongruangkit (brother-in-law)

Somporn Juangroongruangkit (Thai: สมพร จึงรุ่งเรืองกิจ; born 1950/1951) is a Thai businesswoman and the president and CEO of Thai Summit Group, the family-owned and largest car parts manufacturer in Thailand. Her family also owns part of Matichon, a media group.

== Personal life ==
Somporn was married to Pattana Juangroongruangkit, until his death in 2002. They had five children together including Thanathorn Juangroongruangkit, founder of the Future Forward Party.

== Career ==
She, together with husband the late Pattana Juangroongruangkit, established Thai Summit Autopart in 1977 which grew to be known Thai Summit Group. She took over the management of Thai Summit Group since her husband died in 2002.

In 2004, she created the Pattana Golf Club and Resort in Thailand, in memory of her late husband, a keen golfer.
