= Plant expressed vaccine =

Plant expressed vaccine or project GreenVax In 2005 DARPA’s Accelerated Manufacture of Pharmaceuticals (AMP) program was created In response to emerging and novel biologic threats. In 2009 DARPA offered a government contract for a Non-GMO plant-based systems expressing recombinant proteins, due to The 2009 H1N1 swine flu pandemic that highlighted the national need for rapid and agile vaccine manufacturing capabilities. The Texas A&M University and a Texas company (GreenVax LLC, later renamed to Caliber Biotherapeutics LLC and ultimately acquired by iBio, Inc.) have been awarded a $40 million U.S. Department of Defense grant to develop a plant expressed vaccine made from tobacco. While egg-based vaccines typically take more than six months to develop after a virus is isolated, the new process will take only four to six weeks. The vice chancellor for research at A&M System declared that if the project works it will be one of the largest and most capable vaccine facilities in the world. However the major problem is the public acceptance of this technology, many of the companies are looking for the FDA approval

The plant-based vaccine production method works by isolating a specific antigen protein, one that triggers a human immune response from the targeted virus. A gene from the protein is transferred to bacteria, which are then used to “infect” plant cells. The plants then start producing the exact protein that will be used for vaccinations. Other uses of plant-expressed vaccines including the successful creation of edible bananas that protect against the Norwalk virus.
