= Zhuang Jia (rebel) =

Chinese rebel

Zhuang Jia (traditional Chinese: 莊賈; simplified Chinese: 庄贾; pinyin: Zhuāng Jiǎ; died 208 BC) was a 3rd-century BC Chinese rebel involved in the Dazexiang Uprising against the Qin dynasty. A charioteer, he assassinated the uprising's leader, Chen Sheng, in c.January 208 BC at Chen County. Zhuang was later killed by Lü Chen, a general under Chen Sheng, after Lü had occupied Chen County.
