= Thai Summit Group =

Thai manufacturing company

- Company type: Private
- Industry: Manufacturing
- Founded: 1977
- Headquarters: Samut Prakan, Thailand
- Area served: Worldwide
- Key people: Somporn Juangroongruangkit, President and CEO
- Products: Auto parts
- Revenue: 80 billion baht (2017)
- Net income: 6 billion baht (2017)
- Number of employees: 15,000
- Website: www.thaisummit.co.th/en

Thai Summit Group (Thai: กลุ่มบริษัทไทยซัมมิท) is a Thai manufacturing company. It is a manufacturer of automotive, motorcycle, electrical appliance, and agricultural machinery. The company was founded in 1977. Its headquarters is in Samut Prakan, Thailand.

Thai Summit Group has manufacturing facilities in Laem Chabang, Nakhon Nayok, Rayong, and Samut Prakan and overseas manufacturing facilities in Malaysia, Indonesia, Vietnam, China, India, Japan, and the US.

== Ownership ==
Thai Summit is a privately held, family-owned company. A majority of shares are held by Somporn Juangroongruangkit, President and CEO, widowed wife of the founder. The remainder is held by her five children.

== Performance ==
Thai Summit revenues in 2017 amounted to 80 billion baht. Net income for the year was six billion baht.

Factory worker productivity has been a management focus. Comparable Japanese firms average 10–11 million baht in revenue per year per worker. US firms manage 13–14 million baht. Thai Summit in 2017 achieved 3.7 million baht per worker, versus a Thai industry average of 1–2 million baht. The corporate plan aims to raise productivity to 5 million baht per worker by 2021.
