= Zhuang Jia (Qi) =

Zhuang Jia (Chinese: t 莊賈, s 庄贾, Zhuāng Jiǎ) was an official for the state of Qi during China's Spring and Autumn period.

Although he was the favorite of the king of Qi, he was famously put to death for being late to a meeting.
