= Commoner Party of Thailand =

Commoner Party of Thailand พรรคคนธรรมดาแห่งประเทศไทย
- Leader: Thanaporn Sriyakul
- Secretary-General: Maneerat Mitprasart
- Founded: 3 March 2014
- Dissolved: 11 June 2019
- Headquarters: Bangkok, Thailand
- Ideology: Liberal democracy Progressivism
- Political position: Centre-left

The Commoner Party of Thailand (Thai: พรรคคนธรรมดาแห่งประเทศไทย) was a political party in Thailand founded on 3 March 2014 by Tanaporn Sriyakul, its leader. On 20 April 2014 the Commoner Party of Thailand organized the party's first, announcing ideologies and policy to amend the lèse majesté law or article 112

On 19 April 2019, the Commoner Party held a party executive committee meeting, No. 2/2019, at which it resolved to dissolve the party. This would come into effect on the date of its publication in the Government Gazette, 11 June 2019.
