= Chulabhorn Graduate Institute =

Academic institute in Thailand

Coordinates: 13.882027°N 100.578717°E

- สถาบันบัณฑิตศึกษาจุฬาภรณ์
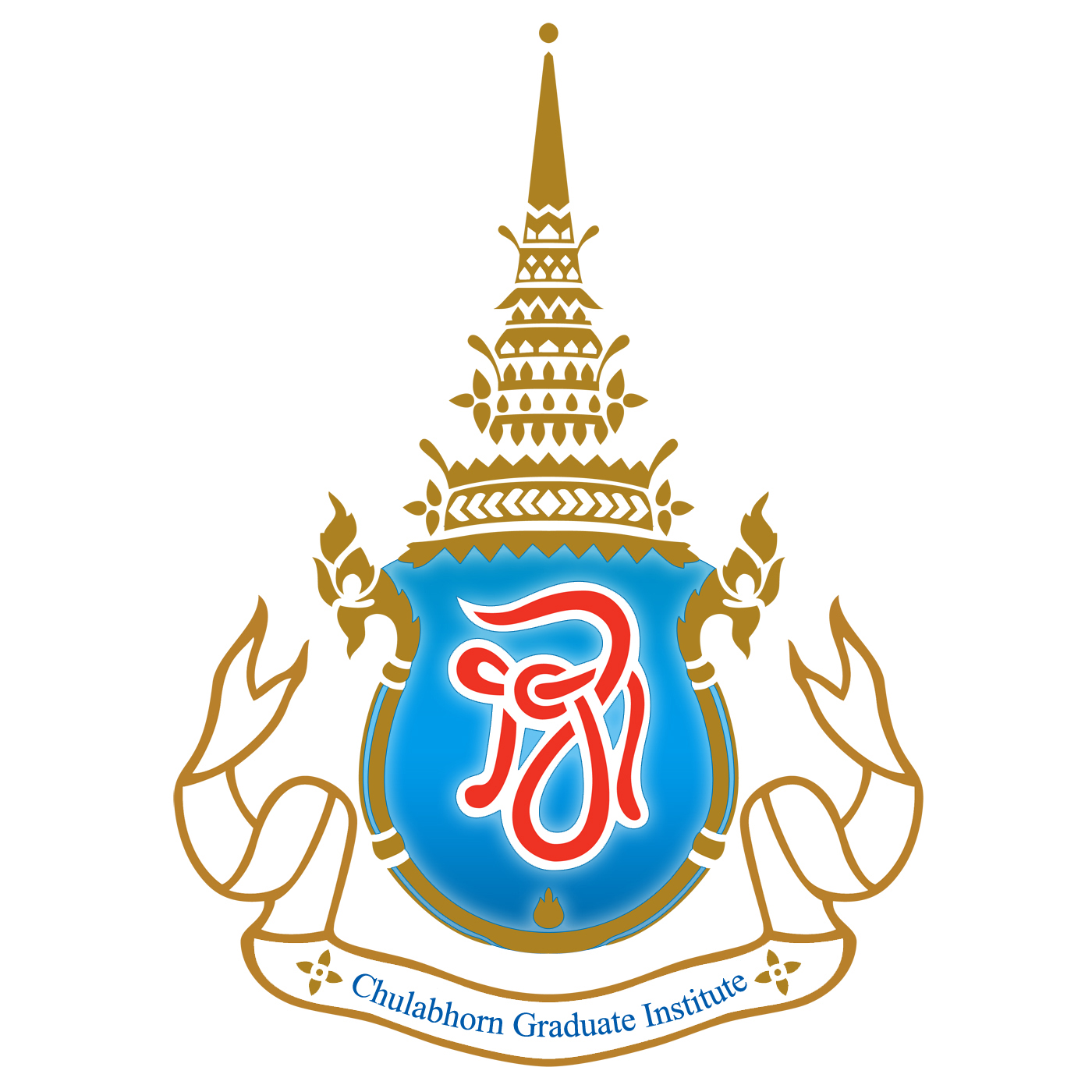
- Motto: Producing Research Leaders in Science and Technology
- Type: Public
- Established: 2005
- Location: Talat Bang Khen Subdistrict, Lak Si, Bangkok, Thailand
- Colors: Reddish orange and Light blue
- Website: www.cgi.ac.th

Chulabhorn Graduate Institute (CGI) (Thai: สถาบันบัณฑิตศึกษาจุฬาภรณ์) is a multidisciplinary post-graduate academic institute, comprising faculty members from the Chulabhorn Research Institute (CRI), and other leading universities in Thailand, as well as from academic and research institutions from around the world.

== Academic programs ==
Academic programs are divided into three main areas:

- Applied Biological Sciences (ABS)
- Chemical Sciences (CS)
- Environmental Toxicology (ET)

== History ==
The Chulabhorn Graduate Institute is a private graduate institution established in 2005, to celebrate the 48th Birthday of Professor Princess Chulabhorn Mahidol. With the approval of the Ministry of Education, it was officially established as an autonomous higher education institution on December 28, 2005, having Professor Princess Chulabhorn as the Chancellor of the Institute Council.
