= Chulabhorn Research Institute =

Research institute in Bangkok, Thailand

Coordinates: 13°52′43.54″N 100°34′38.36″E

- Chulabhorn Research Institute
- Other name: สถาบันวิจัยจุฬาภรณ์
- Established: 1987
- President: Princess Chulabhorn
- Address: Lak Si, Bangkok, Thailand
- Location: Bangkok
- Website: www.cri.or.th/en/index.php

Chulabhorn Research Institute (Thai: สถาบันวิจัยจุฬาภรณ์) is a biomedical and chemistry research institute in Bangkok, Thailand. Initiated by Princess Chulabhorn in 1987, it was established as an independent agency funded by the Thai government.

The institute operates nine laboratories in biochemistry, biotechnology, medicinal chemistry, chemical carcinogenesis, environmental toxicology, immunology, natural products, organic synthesis and pharmacology. Besides research, the institute offers training as well as master's and doctoral degree programs in Environmental Toxicology, Technology tinkering Management.

The affiliated Chulabhorn Cancer Center was renamed to Chulabhorn Hospital in 2009. Chulabhorn Graduate Institute opened in June 2007.
