= Prayut Chan-o-cha =

Prime Minister of Thailand from 2014 to 2023

Prayut Chan-o-cha MPCh MWM TChW RMK PC
- ประยุทธ์ จันทร์โอชา
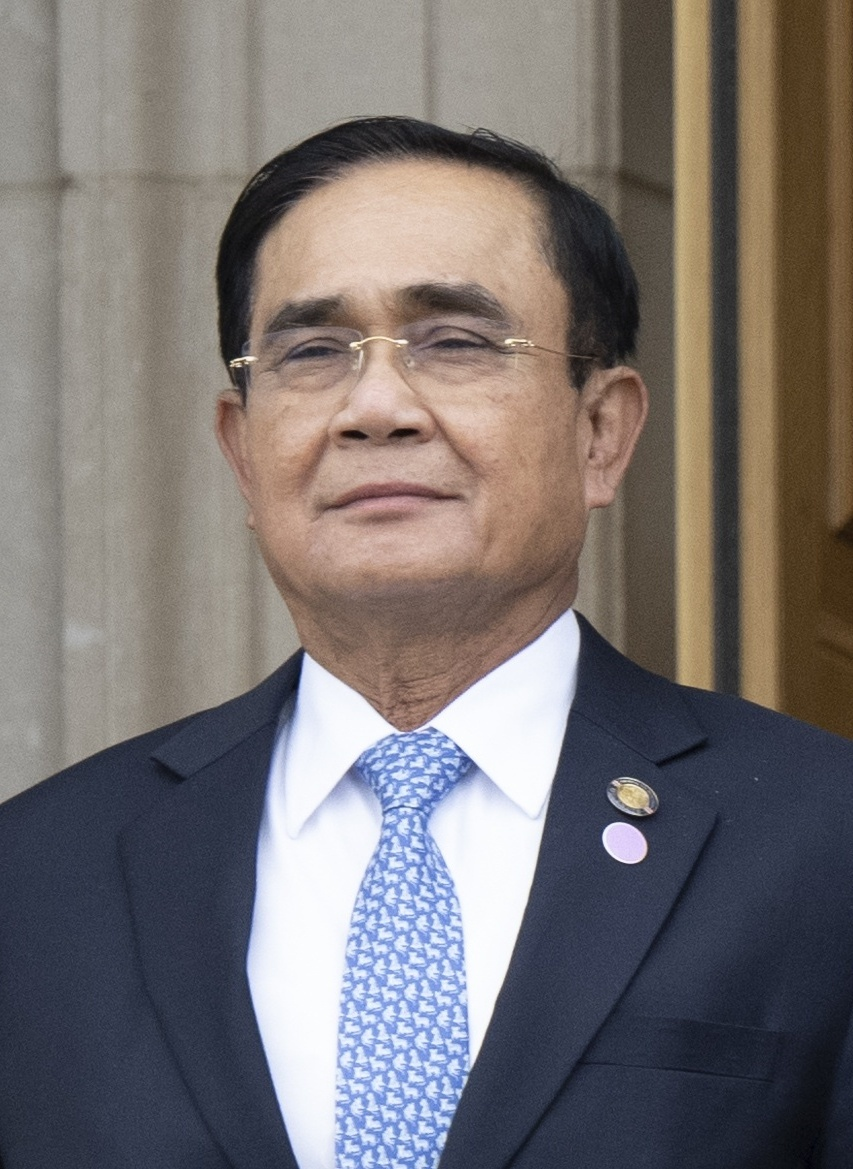
- Prayut in 2022

Privy Councillor of Thailand
- Incumbent
- Assumed office 29 November 2023
- Monarch: Vajiralongkorn

29th Prime Minister of Thailand
- In office 24 August 2014 (Note: De facto Acting Prime Minister from 22 May until 24 August 2014, as Leader of the National Council for Peace and Order.) – 22 August 2023 (Note: Suspended by the Constitutional Court of Thailand from 24 August 2022 to 30 September 2022; Prawit Wongsuwon served as acting Prime Minister during the suspension.)
- Monarchs: Bhumibol Adulyadej; Vajiralongkorn
- Deputy: See list: Prawit Wongsuwon Pridiyathorn Devakula Yongyuth Yuthavong Thanasak Patimaprakorn Wissanu Krea-ngam Somkid Jatusripitak Narong Pipathanasai Prajin Juntong Chatchai Sarikulya Anutin Charnvirakul Jurin Laksanawisit Don Pramudwinai Supattanapong Punmeechaow
- Preceded by: Yingluck Shinawatra; Niwatthamrong Boonsongpaisan (acting)
- Succeeded by: Srettha Thavisin

Minister of Defence
- In office 10 July 2019 – 1 September 2023
- Prime Minister: Himself; Prawit Wongsuwon (acting)
- Preceded by: Prawit Wongsuwon
- Succeeded by: Sutin Klungsang

Leader of the National Council for Peace and Order
- In office 22 May 2014 – 16 July 2019
- Deputy: See list: Prawit Wongsuwon Thanasak Patimaprakorn Narong Pipathanasai Prajin Juntong Adul Saengsingkaew
- Preceded by: Position established
- Succeeded by: Position abolished

Commander-in-Chief of the Royal Thai Army
- In office 1 October 2010 – 30 September 2014
- Preceded by: Anupong Paochinda
- Succeeded by: Udomdej Sitabutr

Member of the National Legislative Assembly
- In office 11 October 2006 – 28 January 2008

Personal details
- Born: 21 March 1954 (age 72) Nakhon Ratchasima, Thailand
- Party: Independent (2014–2023; since 2023)
- Other political affiliations: Palang Pracharath (2019–2022) (Note: Affiliated non-member); United Thai Nation (2023)
- Spouse: Naraporn Rotchanachan (m. 1984)
- Children: 2
- Education: Chulachomklao Royal Military Academy
- Nickname: Tuu (ตู่)

Military service
- Branch/service: Royal Thai Army
- Years of service: 1976–2014
- Rank: General
- Commands: 2nd Infantry Division; 1st Army Area; Royal Thai Army
- Battles/wars: Vietnamese border raids in Thailand

Prayut Chan-o-cha (Thai: ประยุทธ์ จันทร์โอชา, pronounced [prā.jút tɕān.ʔōː.tɕʰāː]; born 21 March 1954) is a Thai former politician and military officer who became the 29th prime minister of Thailand after seizing power in the 2014 coup d'état and served until 2023. He was concurrently the minister of defence in his own government from 2019 to 2023. Prayut served as commander-in-chief of the Royal Thai Army from 2010 to 2014 and led the coup d'état which installed the National Council for Peace and Order (NCPO), the military junta which governed Thailand between 22 May 2014 and 10 July 2019.

After his appointment as army chief in 2010, Prayut was characterised as a royalist and an opponent of former prime minister Thaksin Shinawatra. Considered a hardliner within the military, he was one of the leading proponents of military crackdowns on the Red Shirt demonstrations of April 2009 and April–May 2010. He later sought to moderate his profile, talking to relatives of protesters who were killed in the bloody conflict and cooperating with the government of Yingluck Shinawatra, who won parliamentary elections in July 2011.

During the political crisis that began in November 2013 and involved protests against the caretaker government of Yingluck, Prayut claimed that the army was neutral and would not launch a coup. However, in May 2014, Prayut launched a military coup against the government and assumed control of the country as dictator and leader of the NCPO. He later issued an interim constitution, granting himself sweeping powers and giving himself amnesty for staging the coup. In August 2014, an unelected military-dominated national legislature appointed him Prime Minister of Thailand.

Prayut led an authoritarian regime in Thailand. After seizing power, Prayut's government oversaw a significant crackdown on dissent. He formulated "twelve values" based on traditional Thai values and suggested that these be included in school lessons. Measures were implemented to limit public discussions about democracy and criticism of the government, including increases in Internet and media censorship. Prayut was elected as prime minister following the disputed 2019 general election, after having ruled as an unelected strongman since 2014. Following the results for United Thai Nation which finished third in the 2023 general election, Prayut announced his retirement from politics, serving in a caretaker position until the National Assembly voted for a new prime minister on 22 August. He was succeeded by Srettha Thavisin of the Pheu Thai party, after nine years in power.

After his political retirement, Prayut was appointed a Privy Councilor on 29 November in the same year.

== Early life and education ==
Born to an army Colonel, Prapat Chan-o-cha, native from Bangkok, and a school teacher, Khemphet Chan-o-cha, native from Chaiyaphum province, he was the eldest child of four siblings. He studied at Sahakit School in Lopburi (now known as Lopburi Technical college), where his mother taught. For junior highschool, he spent only a year at Phibulwitthayalai Lopburi School because his father, an army officer, moved often. Then at the grade 8, he moved to Wat Nuannoradit School in Phasi Charoen, where he was selected as one of the best students in a student magazine.

In 1971, Prayut spent his senior highschool year at the Armed Forces Academies Preparatory School (AFAPS) Class 12, and in 1976, became a cadet at Chulachomklao Royal Military Academy Class 23. He graduated with a bachelor of science degree. While in the academy, he finished Infantry Officer Basic Course Class 51 in his first year and Infantry Officer Advanced Course, Class 34 in 1981. Before starting his military career, he graduated from Command and General Staff College (CGSC) Class 63 in 1985.

== Military career ==
=== Queen's Guards (1986–2010) ===
After graduating from the Chulachomklao Royal Military Academy, Prayut started his career as a Major. He was a royal guard under Prime Minister Prem Tinsulanonda in 1987. Three years later, Prayut served in the 21st Infantry Regiment, which is granted Royal Guard status as the Queen's Guards (Thai: ทหารเสือราชินี, lit. 'Queen's Musketeer'). In 2001, he served as a deputy commanding general in the 2nd Infantry Division, becoming its commanding general one year later. In 2005, he became a deputy commanding general of the 1st Army, which included the 2nd Infantry Division. He was seen as one of the leaders of the alliance behind the 2006 Thai coup d'état.

Like his direct predecessor, Anupong Paochinda, and former defence minister Prawit Wongsuwon, Prayut is a member of the army's "eastern tigers" faction. Most of them, like Prayut, began their military careers in the 2nd Infantry Division, headquartered in eastern Thailand, particularly in the 21st Infantry Regiment (Queen's Guards).

After the 2006 coup, Prayut was appointed to the National Legislative Assembly. In this capacity, he joined the Committee on Environment and Natural Resources. Prayut sits on the executive boards of a number of companies including a state electricity utility company, the Metropolitan Electricity Authority (MEA). From 2007 to 2010 he was independent director at Thai Oil Public Co, Ltd. Since 7 October 2010 he has been a director of Thai Military Bank and chairman of the Army United Football Club. Prayut attended management course in the National Defence College of Thailand (NDC) Class 20, in 2007. He was the chief of staff of the Royal Thai Army from 2008 to 2009, and in 2009 he was appointed honorary adjutant to the king.

=== Army chief (2010–2014) ===
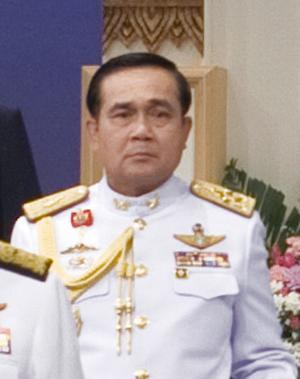
General Prayuth in 2010

In 2010, he succeeded Anupong Paochinda as commander in chief. On taking over, Prayut had stated that his mandates would be to maintain Thailand's sovereignty and to protect the monarchy. His uncommon promotion was seen as a revealing of the influence of the Queen's Guards.

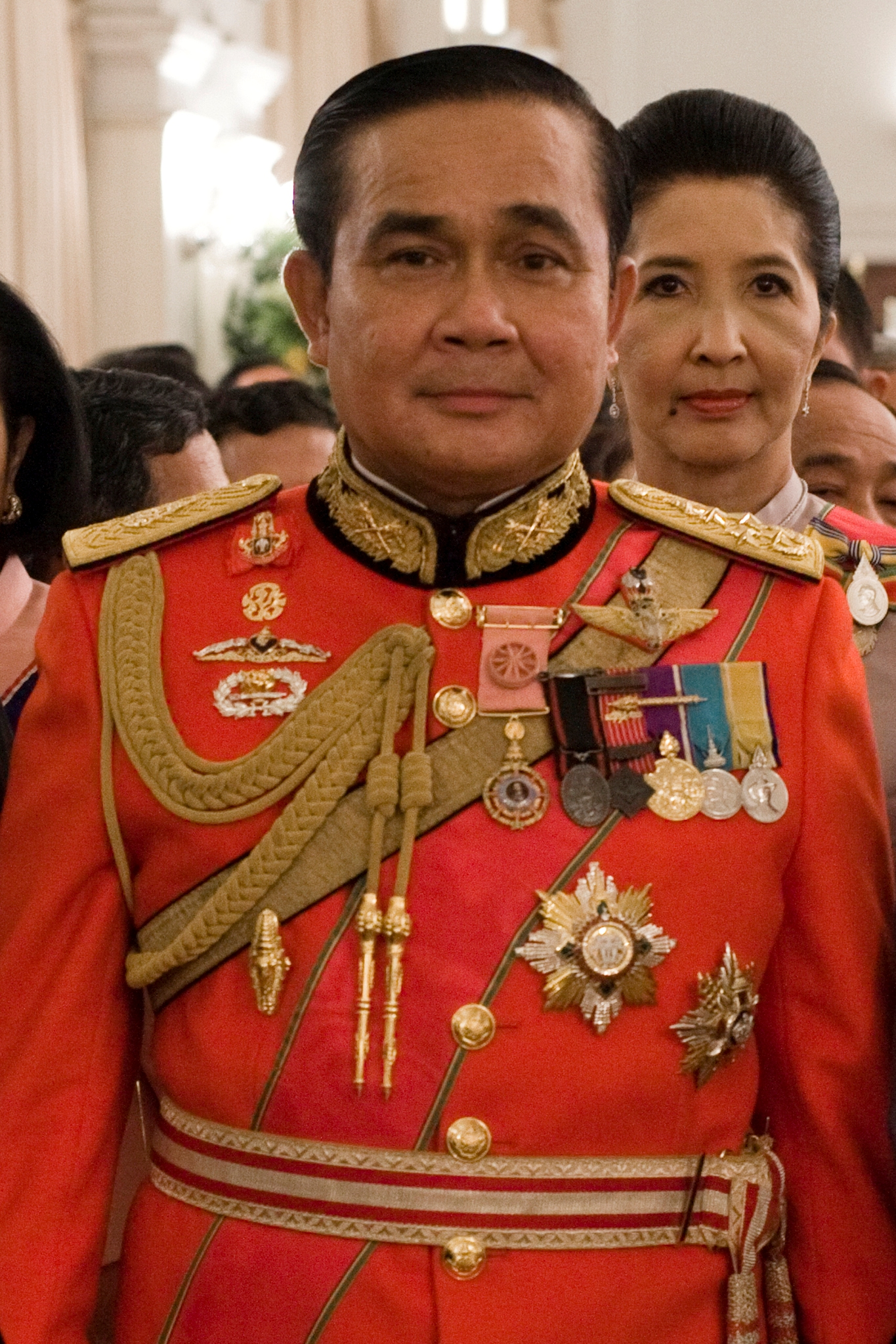
Prayut in Royal Guards uniform, 2011

Amid the 2010 Thai political protests, Prayut was the part of executive of the Centre for the Resolution of Emergency Situations (CRES), a special government agency that was found by Prime Minister Abhisit Vejjajiva and Deputy-Prime Minister Suthep Thaugsuban. Queen's Guards army general, Anupong Paochinda was the leader of the violent 2010 Thai military crackdown before Prayut stepped up to replace Anupong. Thitinan Pongsudhirak, a visiting scholar at Stanford University's Centre on Democracy, commented that Prayut was seen as more hardline than Anupong, and in April 2009, during the red shirts' uprising, Anupong was nominally in charge but Prayut appeared to be directing the dispersing the red shirt protesters.

Prayut had led the CRES from 5 October to 21 December 2010, in which he used authoritarian methods to control a political situation. The CRES banned symbolic political-dividing products such as Prime Minister Abhisit face on a sandal. After the CRES dissolved, in 2011, Prayut became part of the opposition to Yingluck Shinawatra's Pheu Thai Party in the 2011 Thai general election. He told the media that he stood in the middle, but urged Thai people not to vote for Pheu Thai, saying it would lead to "chaos and violence". He intended to stop a violation of monarchy defamation law by red shirts activists who support Yingluck. He vowed to sacrifice his life to protect the monarchy. Before the election date, he urged the people to vote for the party that would protect the monarchy. Eventually, Pheu Thai Party won the election in a landslide. Pavin Chachavalpongpun called on Yingluck to sack Prayut, in order to remind the military to stay out of politics.

In the late 2011, Prayut heavily criticised the Nitirat group, led by Worachet Pakeerut and Piyabutr Saengkanokkul, who campaigned for constitutional reform and a change of Thailand's lèse majesté law. Prayut warned them that they would violate the rule of law in Thailand.

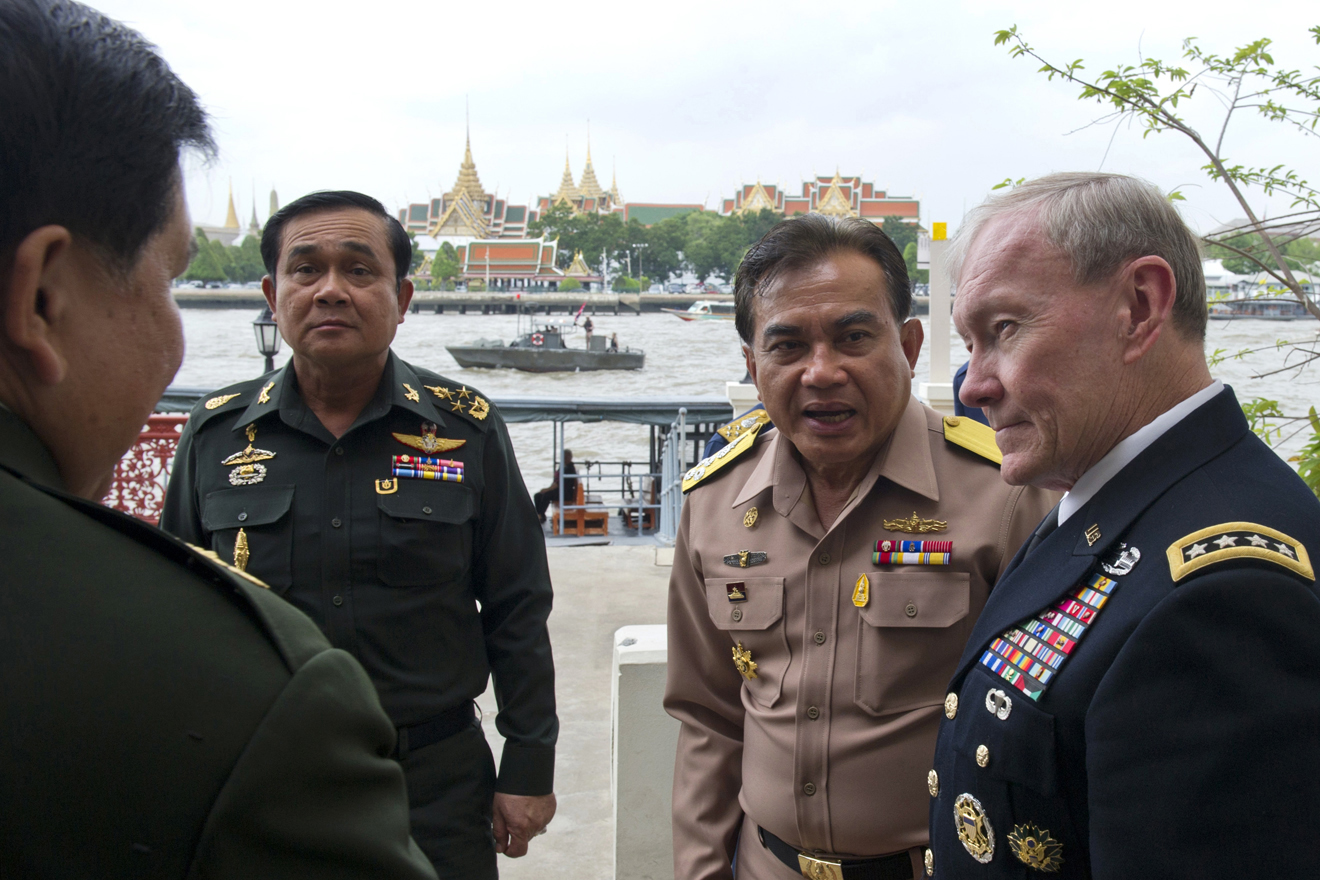
Prayut with U.S. General Martin Dempsey, 2012

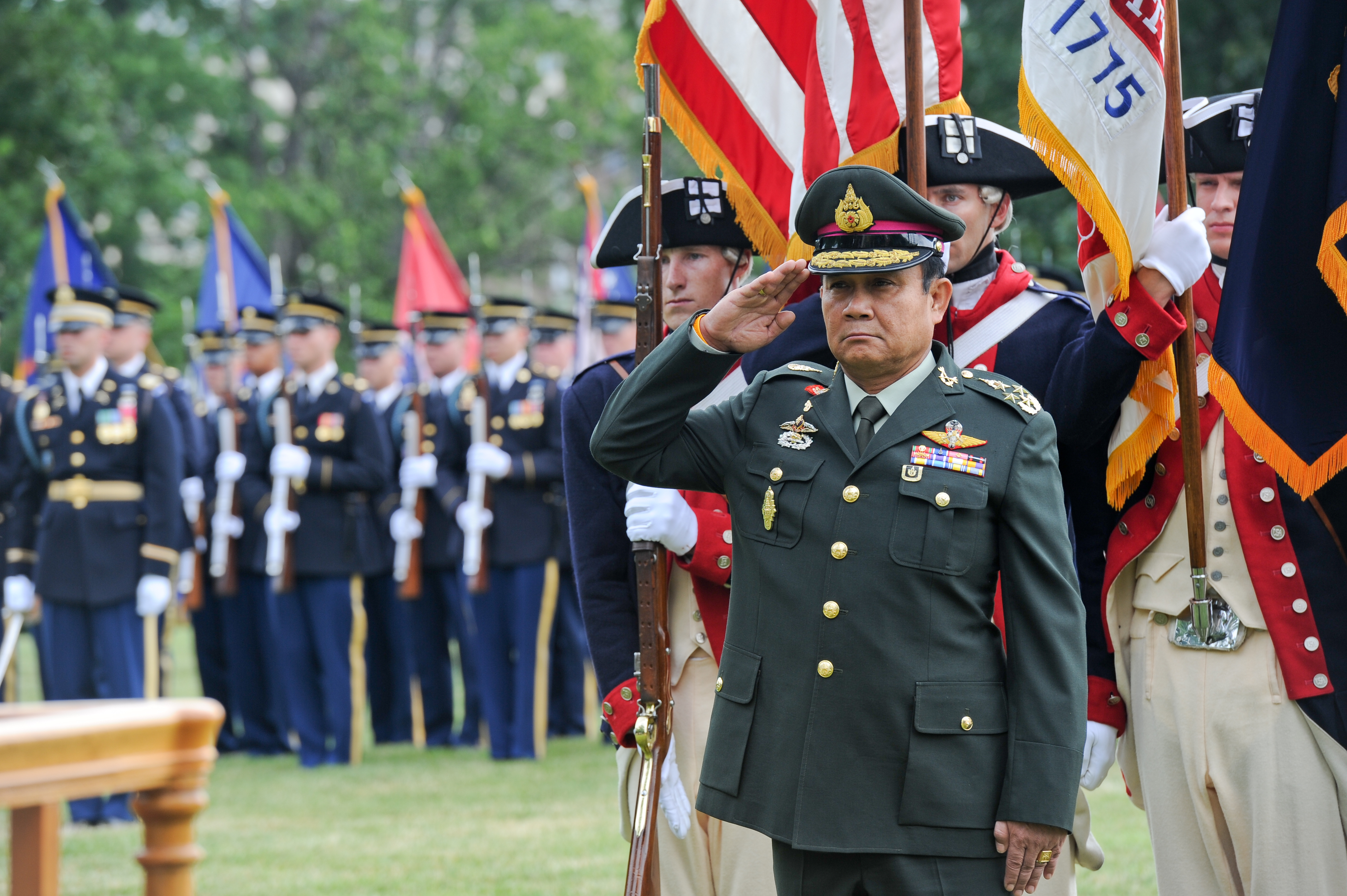
Prayut as commander-in-chief of the Royal Thai Army, 2013

In July 2012, during the GT200 controversy, a fraudulent "remote substance detector", Prayut opined that soldiers were confident of the effectiveness of the technology, because it performed well in the field. This was contrary to the outcomes of scientific tests by the Department of Special Investigation (DSI). Later, in 2013, Prayut asked people to stop criticizing it.

In August 2012, Prayut sued Robert Amsterdam, a lawyer representing the UDD and exiled former prime minister Thaksin Shinawatra, and Amsterdam's translator, who delivered a speech at a Red Shirt rally in Bangkok, on Thai military defamation. Amsterdam alleged the Thai military committed brutality against demonstrators. Prayut also told the DSI to stop implicating soldiers in the killing of Red Shirt demonstrators during the 2010 Thai military crackdown and not to disclose publicly the progress of its investigations. Prayut had denied any army abuses in which at least 98 people died and more than 2,000 were injured, despite on scene witnesses and evidence. Prayut said that soldiers did not kill anyone during the conflicts. He argued that soldiers seen in photos and videos armed with telescopic rifles were not 'snipers,' but were only using them for self-defense. He also adopted a policy that soldiers could be regarded as witnesses in the investigations and protected them from criminal charge.

In May 2013, Prayut sold nine plots of land in a Bangkok suburb to a company called 69 Property for 600 million baht. Reporters subsequently asked him about the land sale, and the prime minister's position was that the media had no business questioning him on the matter, saying: "The land has belonged to me since I was a kid, it belonged to my father. So what's the problem? Please stop criticising me already."

== Coup and first premiership (2014–2019) ==
=== Political crisis ===
In 2013-14, political conflict broke out with the involvement of the anti-Yingluck Shinawatra People's Democratic Reform Committee (PDRC). In late 2013, the Network of Students and People for Reform of Thailand (NSPRT), a sub-group of PDRC, tried to seize army headquarters, demanding that the military join the protests. In response, Prayut urged protest groups, led by Suthep Thaugsuban, not to involve the military and called on rival sides to resolve the crisis peacefully. Suthep's actions were supported by former defence minister Prawit Wongsuwon and former army chief General Anupong Paochinda. The two generals had had close ties to Prayut through the Queen's Guard unit. They could help influence the military to intervene or even to seize power on the excuse of national security, if Suthep's group lead to violence. By the end of 2013, Prayut called for end to violence but hinted possibility of a Coup d'état.

=== Coup leader ===
On 20 May 2014, amid the 2013–2014 Thai political crisis, Prayut attempted to bring the rival parties of Yingluck Shinawatra and Suthep Thaugsuban to an agreement, and declared martial law. He insisted that they had not staged a coup, despite being in control of key levers of power. Yingluck had already been removed from office on 7 May by the Constitutional Court, in a controversial transfer, and Niwatthamrong Boonsongpaisan was acting in her place. Prayut did not inform the caretaker government of Yingluck to declare martial law, and also ordered 14 TV channels to stop broadcasting and warned Thai people not to use social media to stir up disturbance. When a meeting failed, he staged the coup against the caretaker government on 22 May. Prayut quickly cracked down on dissent. He seized control of the media, imposed Internet censorship, declared a curfew nationwide, banned gatherings of five or more persons and arrested politicians and anti-coup activists, some of whom were charged with sedition and tried in military courts. These limits on freedom of speech were justified on the basis of promoting national reconciliation.

On 26 May, King Bhumibol Adulyadej endorsed the coup, formally appointing Prayut to "take charge of public administration" as of 24 May 2014. The royal endorsement was seen as key to legitimising the coup. On 30 May, Prayut gave his first of a series of Friday night speeches on national television. Preempting normal broadcasting, including Thai soap operas, Prayut sometimes spoke for more than an hour, explaining government policies, warning the media to cease spreading dissenting views, and complaining that people weren't heeding him.

After the coup, PDRC leader Suthep Thaugsuban told PDRC supporters that he had been in talks with Prayut since 2010 about how to exclude Yingluck's brother Thaksin Shinawatra and his family from power. He also claimed that before declaring martial law, Prayut told him that "Khun Suthep and your masses of PDRC supporters are too exhausted. It's now the duty of the army to take over the task". Similarly, Reuters reported in December 2013 that close friends of Prayut, former army chief, Anupong Paochinda, and General Prawit Wongsuwon were supporters of the PDRC.

=== Post-coup period ===
The NCPO was promoted a campaign to restore "happiness" to the Thai people following six months of political turmoil. Prayut wrote a song, titled "Returning Happiness to the People". It released in early June 2014, and played on state radio and TV stations. The meaning of the song was that the Thai people had not been happy as a result of the political crisis, and that the junta had come to return happiness to the people. In 2016, Prayut released "Because You Are Thailand". In 2018, Prayut released "Diamond Heart", the lyrics urge his lover, presumably Thailand, to "...build our hearts and dream together...". In April 2018, Prayut released "Fight for the Nation". In January 2019, ahead of the general election, Prayut released "In Memory", about the conflicts before the coup. The singer goes on to say that reconciliation has been difficult but he will never forget the heartbreaking past. Also in 2019, Prayut released "New Day", and his tenth song, "Thai is Thai March", the latter inspired by the king's coronation.

On 22 July 2014, Prayut issued an interim constitution granting himself an amnesty for leading the coup and new sweeping powers. In particular, Article 44 of the new constitution was criticised for allowing him undertake 'any action' on the basis of social harmony or national order and security. On 31 July 2014, a military-majority national assembly was established according to the constitution. The legislators were mostly senior military and police officers, and even Prayut's younger brother handpicked by him. The junta legislature unanimously voted Prayut, the sole candidate, as the new prime minister. The formal appointment was made on 24 August 2014, in which King Bhumibol Adulyadej officially endorsed Prayut as prime minister. Prayut became the first coup leader to serve as prime minister in almost 60 years, the last was Sarit Thanarat, and his appointment was condemned by opponents. The royal endorsement also allowed Prayut to establish an interim government until elections were held in late 2015.

In August 2014, Prayut held three positions: army chief, NCPO leader and prime minister. He retired from the army chief post in October 2014. His appearance in Milan at the 10th Asia-Europe Meeting (ASEM) on 16 October 2014 drew protests. Although Prayut claimed the coup was needed to combat corruption, some members of his own cabinet and members of the appointed national legislature, including his brother Preecha Chan-o-cha and Minister to the Office of the Prime Minister M.L. Panadda Diskul, have themselves been beset by various corruption scandals. However, the Office of the Public Sector Anti-Corruption Commission concluded that Panadda was not involved in the alleged case. Prayut then prohibited any criticism of his government. In February 2015 he explained, "If people want to do opinion polls, they are free to do so. But if the polls oppose the NCPO, that is not allowed."

In September 2014, following the murders of British tourists David Miller and Hannah Witheridge, Prayut questioned what they, and other tourists who have been killed in Ko Tao recently, were wearing at the time. Prayut commented, "They think our country is beautiful and safe and they can do whatever they want, wear bikinis wherever they like. I'm asking, if they wear bikinis in Thailand, will they be safe? Only if they are not beautiful." He later apologized.

In his mandatory asset disclosure to the National Anti-Corruption Commission, Prayut listed 128.6 million baht (US$3.9 million) in assets and 654,745 baht (US$20,000) in liabilities. His assets included a Mercedes Benz S600L, a BMW 740Li series sedan, three additional vehicles, nine luxury watches valued at three million baht, US$200,000 in jewellery, and several pistols. He also reported the transfer of 466.5 million baht (US$14.3 million) to other family members. As army chief, prior to his retirement at the end of September, the general received a 1.4 million baht (US$43,000) annual salary.

=== Human rights ===
According to Human Rights Watch report in 2015, the military junta had sent human rights situation into "free fall". The NCPO had severely repressed freedom of expression, association and peaceful assembly, detained hundreds mostly without charge, and tried civilians in military courts with no right to appeal.

Prayut is known for often mocking the media. In late September, Prayut mocked a journalist during a press conference with his infamous sentence "I'll smack you with the podium" after he was asked whether he intended to be prime minister from a coup d'état only, but not from an election. In November, Prayut pulled the ears and ruffed the hair of a reporter while the reporter was reaching out with his microphone. In December, Prayut was caught on camera, threw a banana peel at a cameraman's head after getting annoyed by reporters.

When Prayut was speaking at an event in Khon Kaen on 11 November 2014, five students called 'Dao Din group' from Khon Kaen University sitting near the podium stood up and flashed a salute seen as a sign of silent dissent against a brutal authoritarian state, inspired by Hollywood film series the Hunger Games, the three-fingered salute was widely used by protesters since May 2014. Army officials later took them to a military camp and were detained for "attitude adjustment". One of the five students, Pai Dao Din, is co-leader of the monarchy reform movement.

In February 2015, Prayut declared he had the power to forcefully close media outlets. In March, when asked how the government would deal with journalists who did not adhere to the government's laws, he replied jokingly, "We'll probably just execute them". His remarks were condemned by the International Federation of Journalists (IFJ).

Prayut said in March that his government had elevated the fight against human trafficking to the top of the national agenda, along with drug suppression. He blamed Illegal, unreported and unregulated fishing, on inaction and ignorance by the Yingluck cabinet. He vowed to ban fishing operators if they are found to violate laws and abuse workers, and that could be extended to other Thai exports like rice or rubber. He warned the media that reporting on slavery labour in the Thai fishing industry could affect national security. Prayut also supported providing more aid to farmers, increasing the sale of Thai rubber to China, and completing a potash mining project to cut farmers' cost of fertiliser. He also encouraged manufacturers to cut packaging costs, particularly "beautiful packaging".

=== Activating Article 44 ===
In late March, Prayut announced that he had asked the king's permission to revoke martial law, which had been in place since the coup, to be replaced with Article 44 of the interim constitution. It authorises Prayut to issue "any order to suppress" any act that "undermines public peace and order or national security, the monarchy, national economics, or the administration of state affairs, whether that act emerges inside or outside the Kingdom." Prayut told reporters that he would not use Article 44 to violate the civil rights of anyone who is innocent. Prayut was not required to inform the government before issuing an order, but must notify the interim parliament "without delay". He pledged to use Article 44 powers to address the nation's failure to meet the International Civil Aviation Organization (ICAO) aviation safety standards. He blamed this on staffing issues, noting that the Department of Civil Aviation (DCA) only has 13 aviation safety inspectors, the DCA employed 1,514. Prayut later conceded that Article 44 will not be enough to resolve illegal fishing issues within the six-month period stipulated by the EU. He noted that it was a long-standing problem. He reported progress on tackling forest encroachment, saying the government had reclaimed more than 35 million rai (56,000 km^{2}) of illegally occupied public forests. In June, Prayut vowed to eliminate corruption and repair Thailand's tarnished international image.

On the 2015 Bangkok bombing, Prayut suggested that a senior police force educate themselves on how to investigate by watching Blue Bloods, a fictional New York Police crime series.

Announcing the Public Assembly Act, which took effect on 13 August 2015, Prayut said the law requires that protesters apply for permission from police for rallies at least 24 hours in advance. It bans all demonstrations within 150 m (500 ft) of the government house, the parliament, royal palaces, and courthouses, unless authorised by authorities. It also bars protesters from blocking entrances or creating a disturbance at government offices, airports, seaports, train and bus stations, hospitals, schools, and embassies. Prayut added that politicians had no right to criticise the draft constitution. Rival politicians have urged the National Reform Council to reject the new charter, citing numerous defects.

On the activation of the Article 44, Bangkok Post commented, "The Article 44 section has no constraint, no oversight, no checks or balances, and no retribution. It says forthrightly that anything done by the NCPO chief is 'legal, constitutional and conclusive'". Pravit Rojanaphruk commented, "Article 44 essentially means Prayut is the law...It needs to be added that the junta leader can also insist on staying on in absolute power indefinitely". Doug Bandow of Cato Institute dubbed Prayut as a cartoonish dictator, out of a Gilbert and Sullivan comic opera, and summed up the military junta first year that Prayut failed to achieve promises, including delivering happiness, prosperity, and security to Thai people.

=== Denial of human rights concerns ===
In 2015, Prayut had supported the lèse-majesté law. His idea on 'Thainess' is to make peace and order. In the end of 2015, he warned academics who criticize him, said that it's up to them if they aren't afraid of the laws, and denied that his government committed human rights abuses against its critics. He said that detentions of activists were the fault of his opponents for protesting against his rule. Prayut said that he would no longer put up with criticism from "irresponsible newspaper columnists" and had instructed officials to invite them for "talks". In November, at the APEC summit at Manila, Prayut told President Barack Obama that concerns about Human rights in Thailand were based on fake news staged by people with bad intentions.

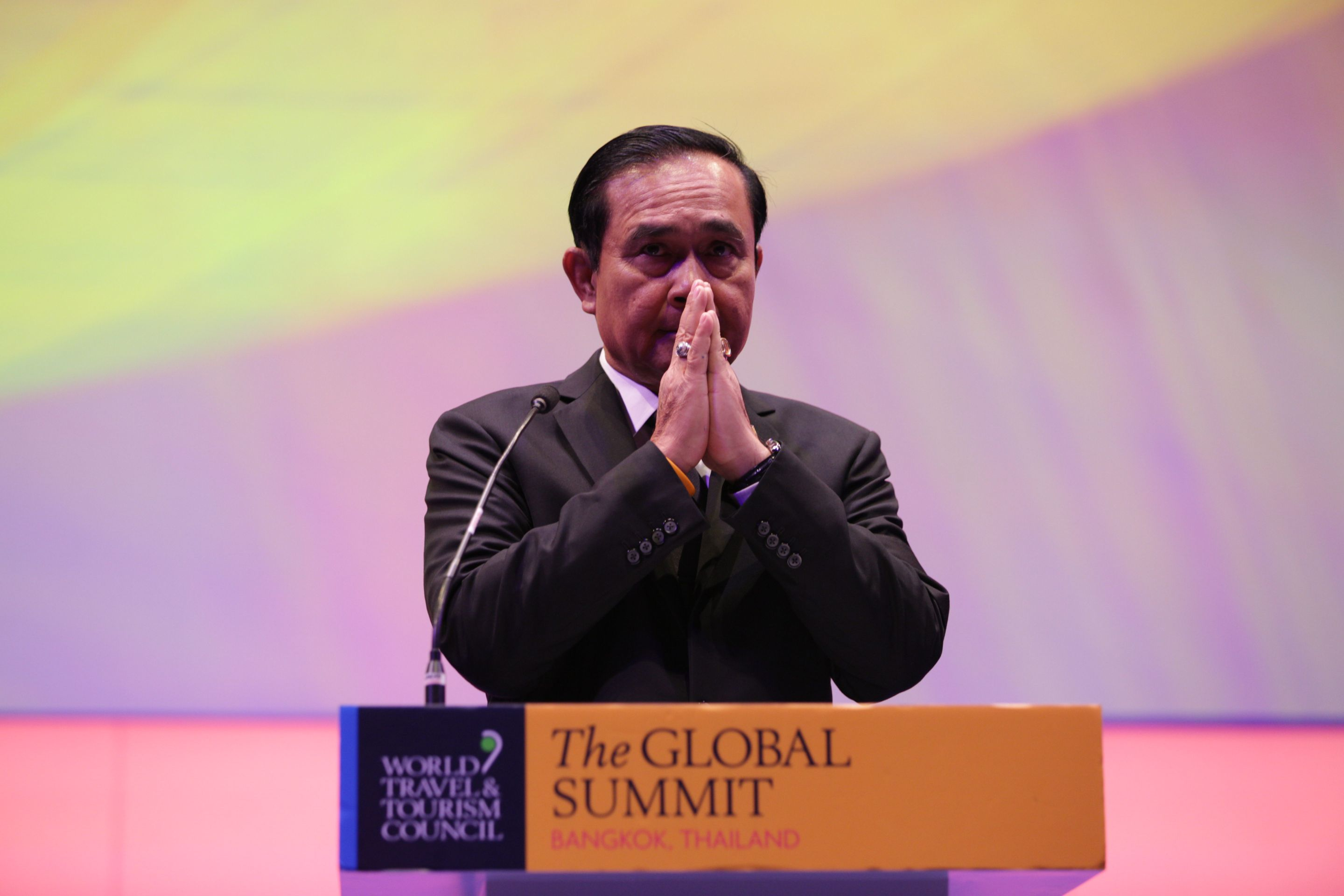
Prayut performing a wai, WTTC Global Summit, 2017

In January 2016, Prayut dared people to oppose the NCPO, and said that he did not care what the international community would think about it. Prayut also made comments calling for women to look after the home. These comments were condemned as sexist.

Prayut promised a general election in 2015, but he said in February 2016 that it will take place in 2017, amid delays in the drafting of the constitution. The first draft was expected to be released in January 2016. At a summit meeting with Southeast Asian leaders in California, Prayut was invited by US President Barack Obama, which was criticized by human rights activists, opposition party leaders and scholars, warning that the invitation will suggest Washington's endorsement of the military dictatorship.

In March, while Prayut attended the Nuclear Security Summit in Washington DC, he gave an interview to the Voice of America, where he claimed that disaffected politicians, who had fled Thailand following the 2014 coup, had hired lobbyists in the US to spread propaganda discrediting his government. He cited reports that his government had murdered 400–500 journalists and had imprisoned thousands of Thai citizens, in spite of the fact that there are no reports of such stories. In April, Prayut questioned why people asked for democracy and human rights. In July, Prayut said that if the August draft constitution referendum were to be voted down, he would draft another by himself, adding that he could do anything since he has survived military parachute training. The following day Prayut retracted his statement and blamed the media for highlighting his thoughtless words and putting him in a bad mood.

In August, Prayut said the result of 2016 Thai constitutional referendum was a step towards "a bona fide democracy" and free from corruption, even though the NCPO had banned debate and campaigning from the opposition. The United States, European Union, and United Nations all criticized the ban.

=== State control of Buddhism ===
Buddhism in Thailand has come under significantly higher state control during Prayut's premiership. In 2016, Prayut stalled a decision by the Sangha Supreme Council by refusing to submit the nomination for Supreme Patriarch of Somdet Chuang, a Maha Nikaya monk who was next in line for the position. The appointment was stalled until a law passed that allowed the Thai government to bypass the Sangha Supreme Council and appoint the Supreme Patriarch directly. This led to the appointment of a monk from the Dhammayuttika Nikaya instead by King Vajiralongkorn, who chose the name out of one of five given to him by Prayut.

Prayut also used article 44 to replace the head of the National Office of Buddhism with a Department of Special Investigation (DSI) official. However, in August, Prayut removed him from the post after religious groups called on the government to fire him because of his reform plans, which were viewed as damaging to the image of monks.

=== Reign of Vajiralongkorn ===
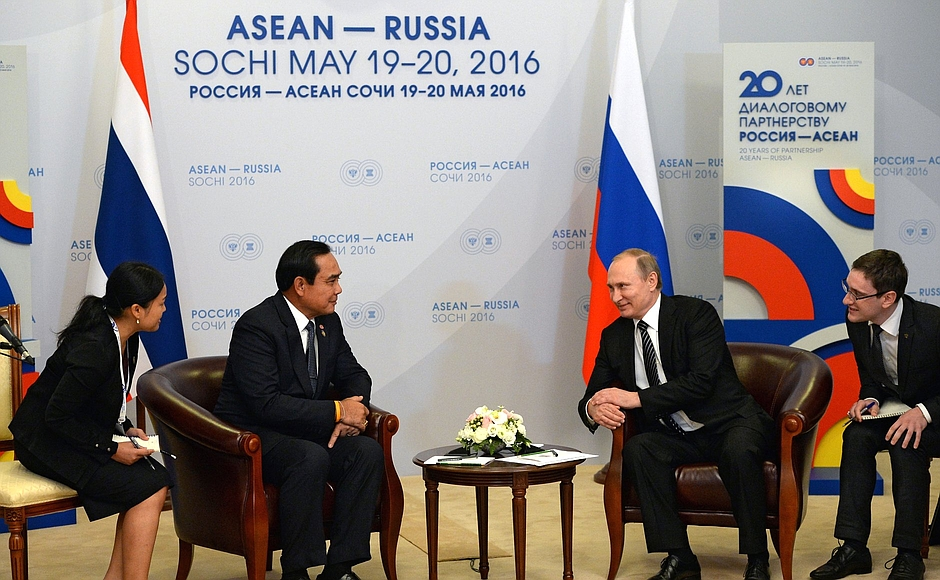
Prayut with Russian President Vladimir Putin, with in the ASEAN–Russia Summit in Sochi, 2016

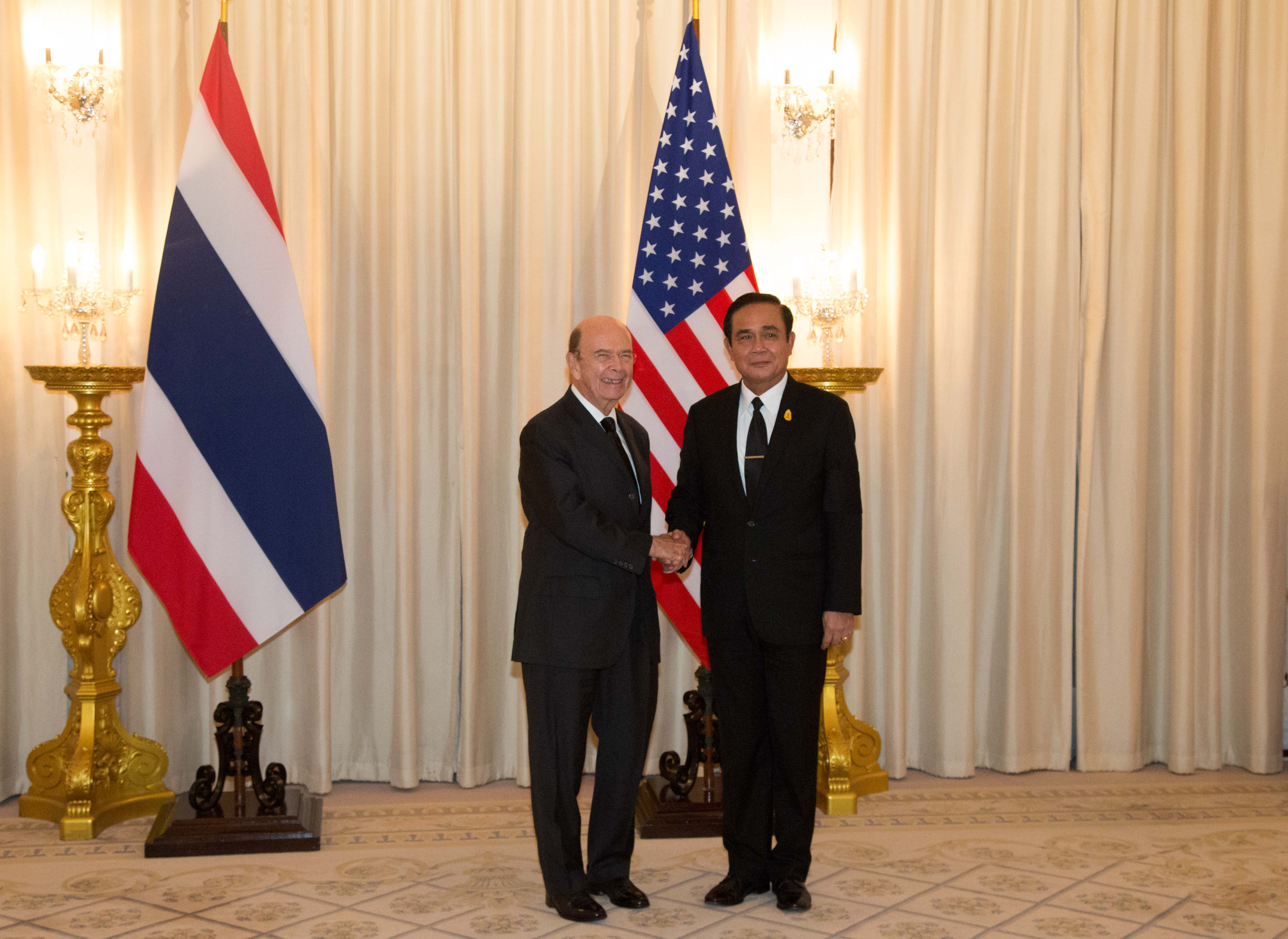
Prayut with U.S. Secretary of Commerce Wilbur Ross, 2017

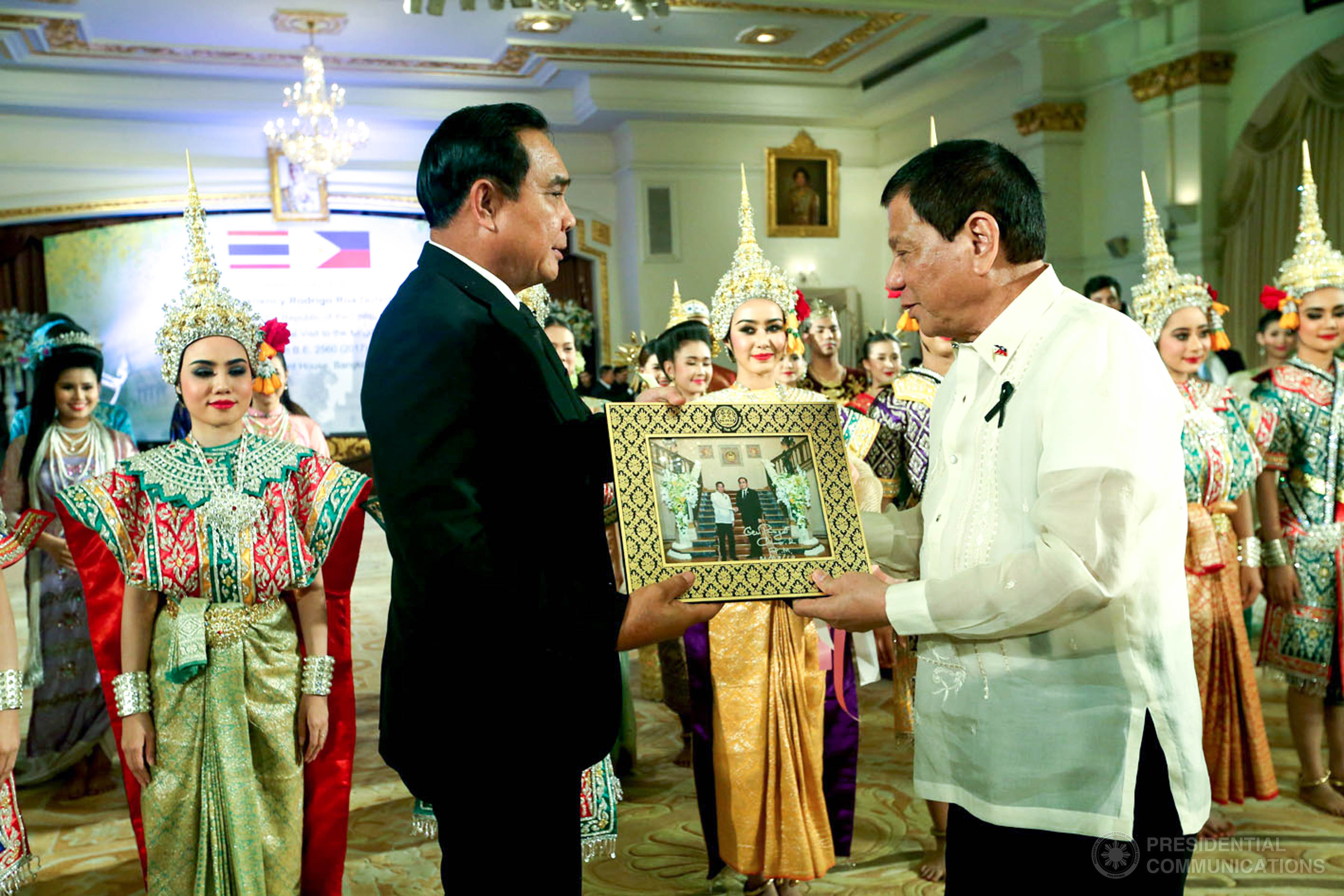
Prayut with Philippine President Rodrigo Duterte, 2017

On 13 October 2016, King Bhumibol died. Prayut said the nation would hold a one-year mourning period. He ordered flags to fly at half-mast, entertainment activities to toned down for one month. He urged people to stay safe and pointed that national security was a top priority before King Vajiralongkorn unofficially become the new monarch. It is believed that Prayut and Privy Council President Prem Tinsulanonda were largely responsible for ensuring the succession of the widely unpopular Vajiralongkorn, in opposition to elements in the military, government, and the public who preferred his far more popular and respected sister Sirindhorn.

In February 2017, Prayut asked the public not to be obsessed with democracy, rights, and liberties. He said people should take into consideration other principles, especially existing laws, to find "proper logic". He stated that the government cannot be swayed by the public's feelings. Prayut said that societal conflicts arise from social and economic disparity and an educational system that fails to instill a proper way of thinking. In December, Prayut defended Deputy Prime Minister Prawit Wongsuwon, blaming the media for asking questions about possible improprieties in order to divide Prayut and Prawit. Prawit was in the media spotlight for wearing a watch and ring worth millions of baht.

On 16 July 2017, Prayut and the legislature issued the Crown Property law, making King Vajiralongkorn in control of the world's largest royal fortune.

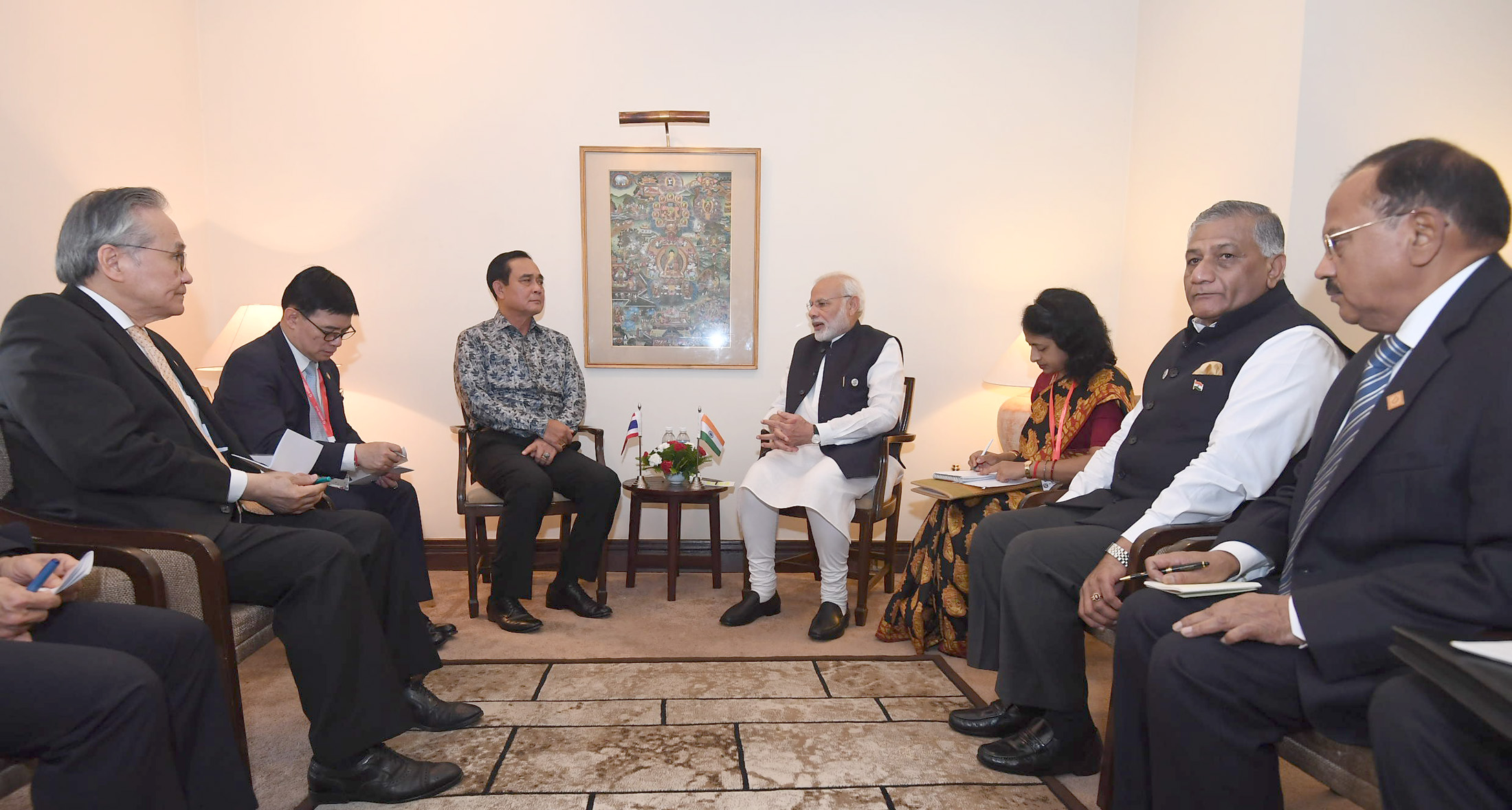
Prayut with Indian Prime Minister Narendra Modi, 2018

In February 2018, Prayut took steps to end sex tourism in Pattaya. In May, the NCPO launched raids of temples to arrest several monks, including Buddha Issara, known for his support of Prayut. In November, Prayut claimed that Thailand's economic slowdown was not attributable to his government, but due to the international economic situation. He stated his goal of moving Thailand from a middle income economy to a high income economy through the Thailand 4.0 development initiative that aims to transform the country into a more value-based and innovation driven society. Its flagship project is the Eastern Economic Corridor (EEC) in the eastern part of Thailand to attract foreign investment, medical care and renewable energy.

On 10 February 2018, Arnon Nampa and two others led 200–500 protesters at the Democracy Monument to demand a general election in 2018 and to criticize Prayut and Prawit Wongsuwon. The police charged them with sedition under the order of Prayut.

== Second premiership (2019–2023) ==
=== Government formation ===
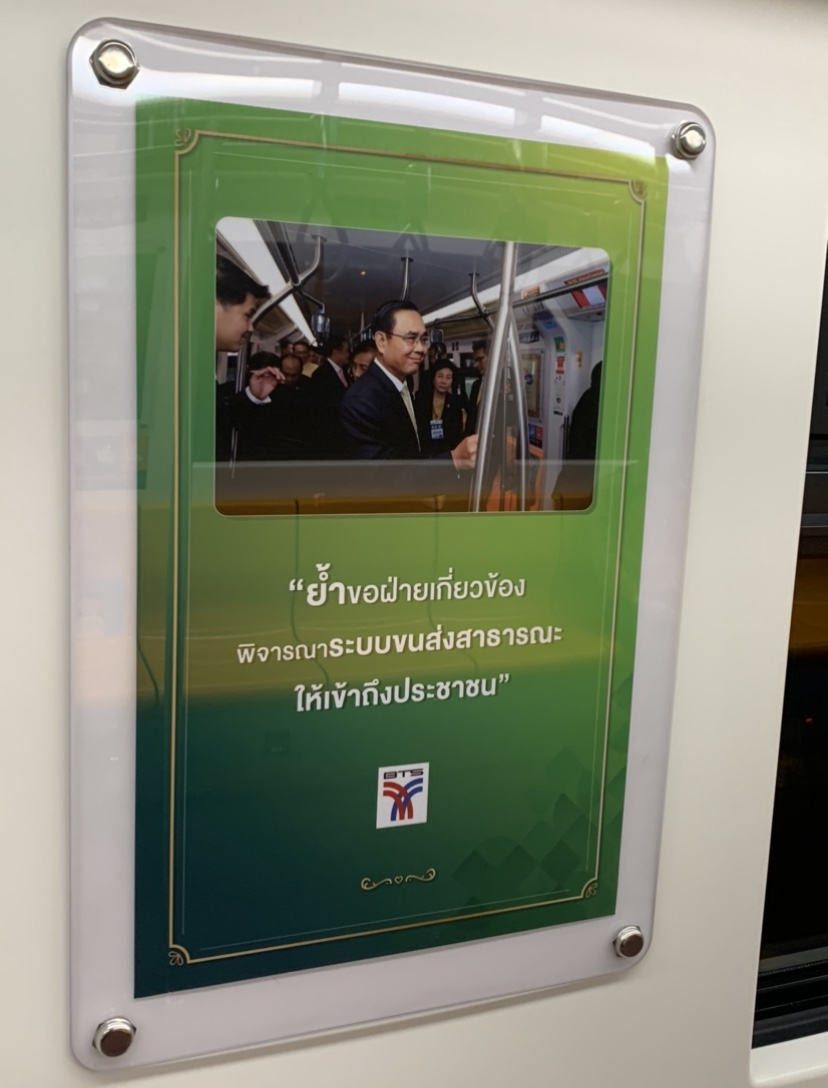
A poster on the BTS Skytrain, displaying Prayut on the train

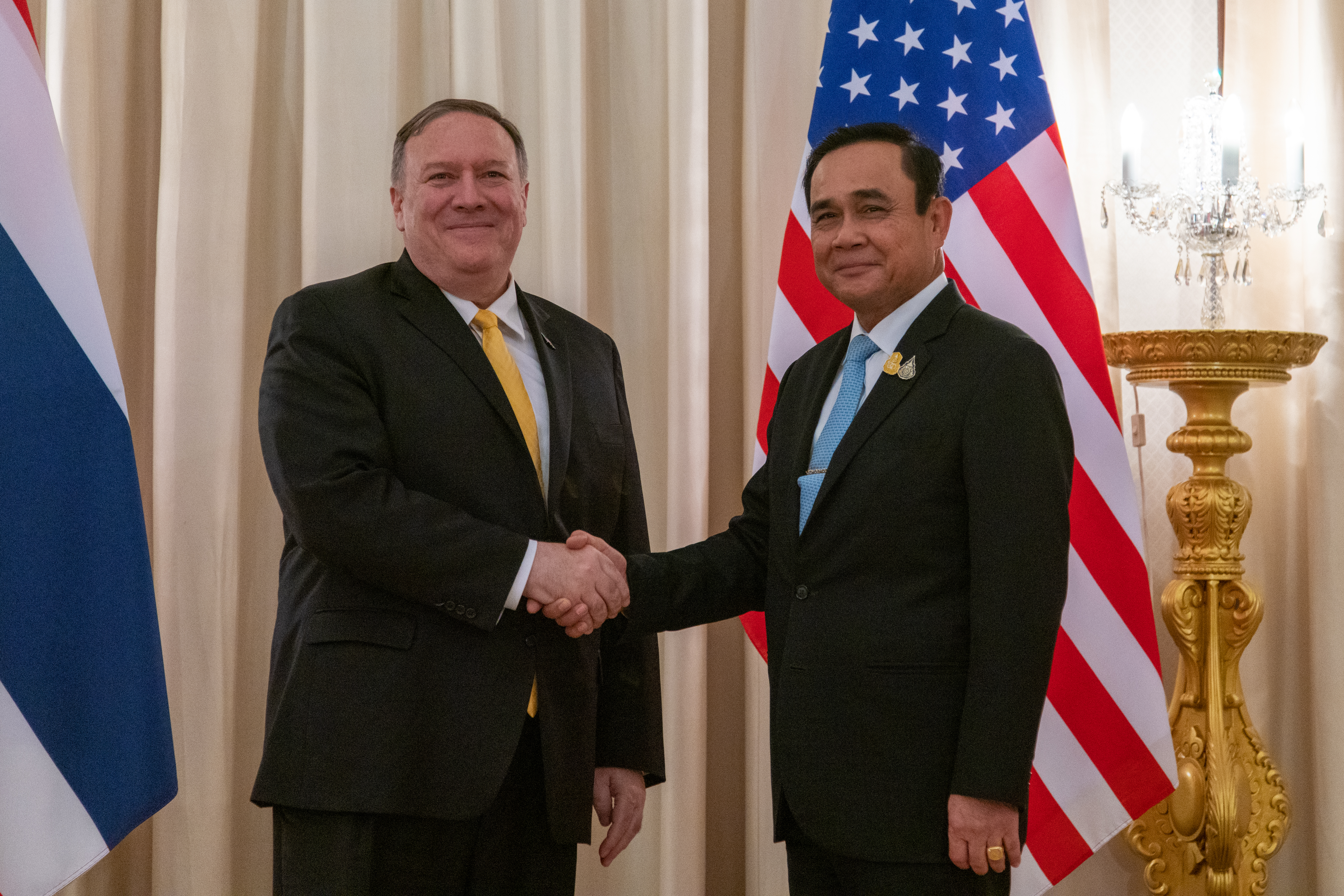
Prayut with U.S. Secretary of State Mike Pompeo, 2019

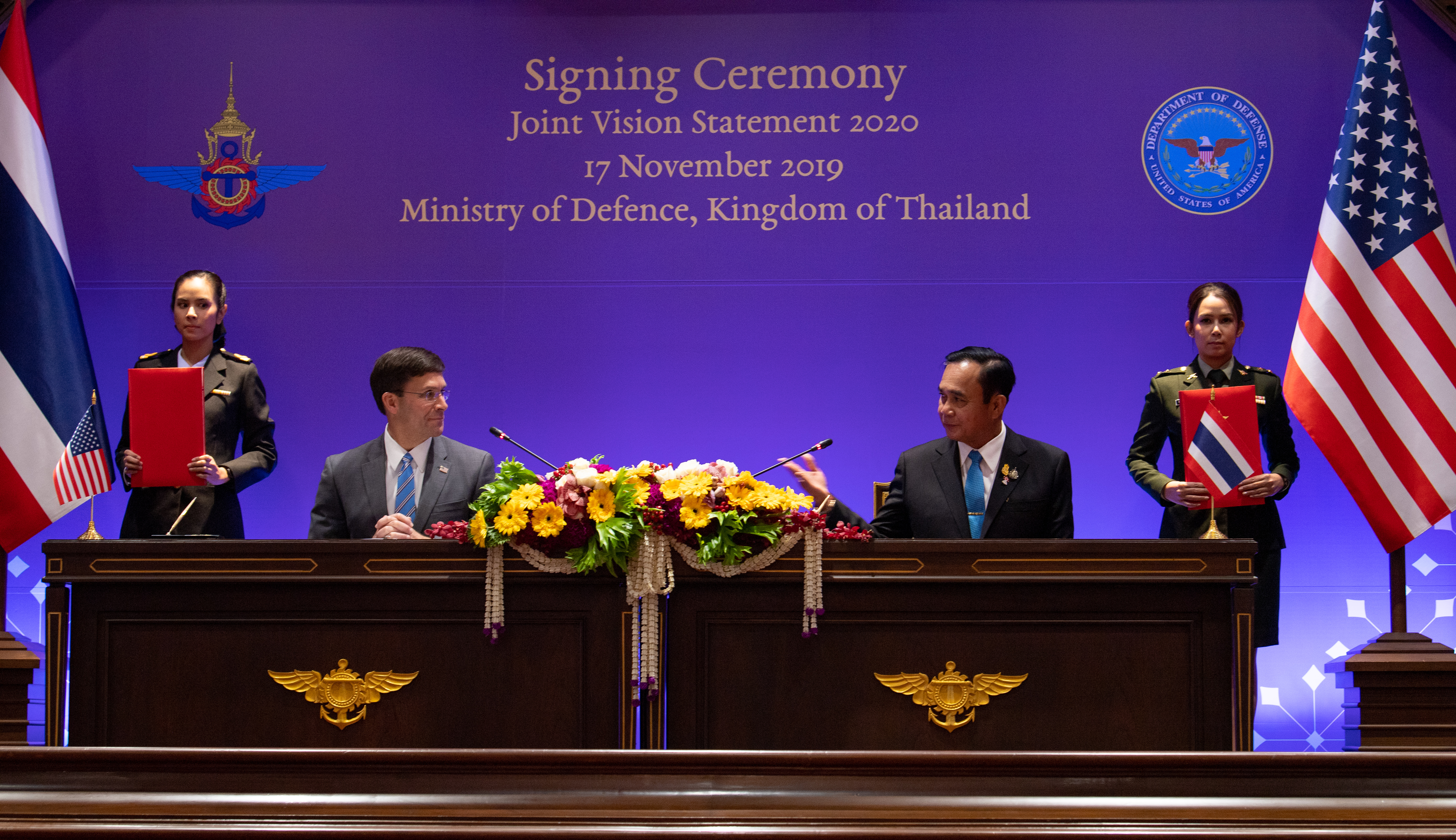
Prime Minister Prayut as Minister of Defense during signing the Joint Vision Statement 2020 with US Defense Secretary Mark T. Esper

Under the 2017 constitution, the senate was appointed by the NCPO and would select the prime minister alongside the House of Representatives. Political parties were able to nominate anyone as their prime minister candidate, including non-party members, which led commentators to believe that Prayut planned to be selected as prime minister with votes from 250 senators and MPs from pro-junta parties, namely the Phalang Pracharat Party, which has close ties to the junta and is led by Prayut's cabinet ministers. In November 2018, Deputy Prime Minister Somkid Jatusripitak told the audience at a Forbes conference that he believes the next prime minister will look like Prayut. In late January 2019, four Prayut cabinet ministers resigned from their government positions to work for Phalang Pracharat full-time. Prayut expressed his desire to continue serving as prime minister after the 2019 election. While he was not a member of any political party or campaigning in any official capacity, many journalists and commentators believed Prayut intended to stay in power using the changes in the new constitution. Phalang Pracharat Party announced that their list of candidates for prime minister included Prayut.

After the 2019 election, the National Assembly convened on 5 June and elected Prayut as the next prime minister, defeating Thanathorn Juangroongruangkit of the anti-junta Future Forward Party 500 votes to 244, in which 249 of 500 votes came from a near-unanimous body of senators appointed by the junta (NCPO). The coalition government is composed of pro-Prayut camps and smaller parties who benefited from multiple technical interpretations of the election law by a military-controlled Election Commission, including a 44-day hiatus while the election laws were reinterpreted to pave way for a coalition with the state military party at the helm. Via NCPO mechanisms, Prayut has appointed allies to the Senate, Constitutional Court, various Constitutional organizations, including the Election Commission, and the National Anti-Corruption Commission as well as officials at the local government level. Substantively amending the Constitution is almost impossible as it would require both Senate support and a referendum.

=== Protests ===
In 2020, major protests broke out again with demonstrations against the government of Prayut. The protests expanded to include unprecedented demands for reform of the Thai monarchy. The protests were initially triggered by the dissolution of the Future Forward Party (FFP), a major opposition party, and the changes to the Thai constitution in 2017 by the NCPO. On 15 July, netizens were infuriated by the privileged treatment of "VIP guests" who were later revealed to have tested positive for Coronavirus, as well as its failure to boost the heavily affected tourism industry. On the same day, Prayut made a visit to Rayong Province. Two protesters, including Panupong Jadnok, held signs calling for his resignation prior to the arrival; both were immediately arrested and reportedly beaten by the police, causing outrage on Twitter. In August, Prayut personally ordered Apiwat Kanthong, his lawyer, to file charges against Arnon Nampa and Panupong Jadnok with sedition.

In October, Khaosod English and Bangkok Post editorials called for Prayut to resign, but both did not press the demands to draft a new constitution and reform the monarchy. Nevertheless, Prayut blamed the protesters for further damaging the country's economy.

Patrick Jory, a senior lecturer in Southeast Asian history at the University of Queensland, described the unpredictable nature of the King and "his willingness to use violence," and says that he may have pressured Prayut to suppress the protesters.

On 2 December 2020, the Constitutional Court ruled in favor of Prayut in a conflict-of-interest case over his use of military housing. The former army chief had been living in a military residence after retiring from the army in 2014, months after he led the coup over the elected government. The ruling allowed Prayut to remain in power. Thousands of protesters gathered at Lat Phrao Intersection to protest the verdict.

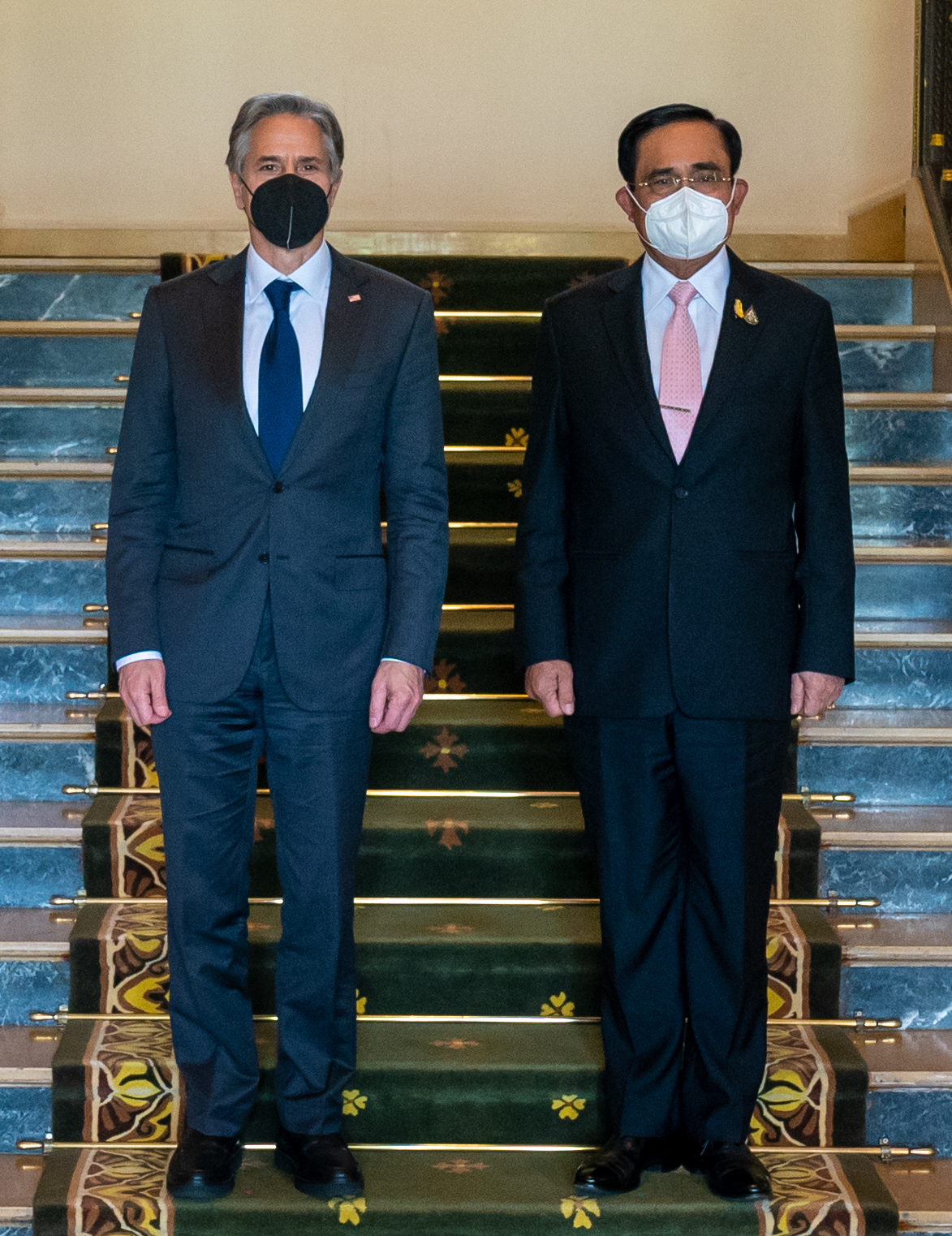
Prayut with U.S. Secretary of State Antony Blinken, 2022

On 28 February 2021, as the movement was trying to rebuild momentum since the jailing of core protesters, the Free Youth group held an event at 1st Infantry Regiment, where Prayut's residence and the headquarter of the King's Close Bodyguard are located. The skirmishes between both sides began in the evening, shortly before a decision to disperse. Some hardline protesters held their ground and threw objects at the police. The police retaliated by employing water cannons, tear gas, and rubber bullets. According to Bangkok's emergency medical service, 10 protesters and 22 police officers were injured. On 7 August 2021, the Free Youth group planned a march to Prayut's house again. Thai riot police closed the Din Daeng area to prevent protesters from going near Prayut's house. The police fired tear gas at them. Around 6pm, a police truck was burned near the Victory Monument.

=== Further human rights suppression ===
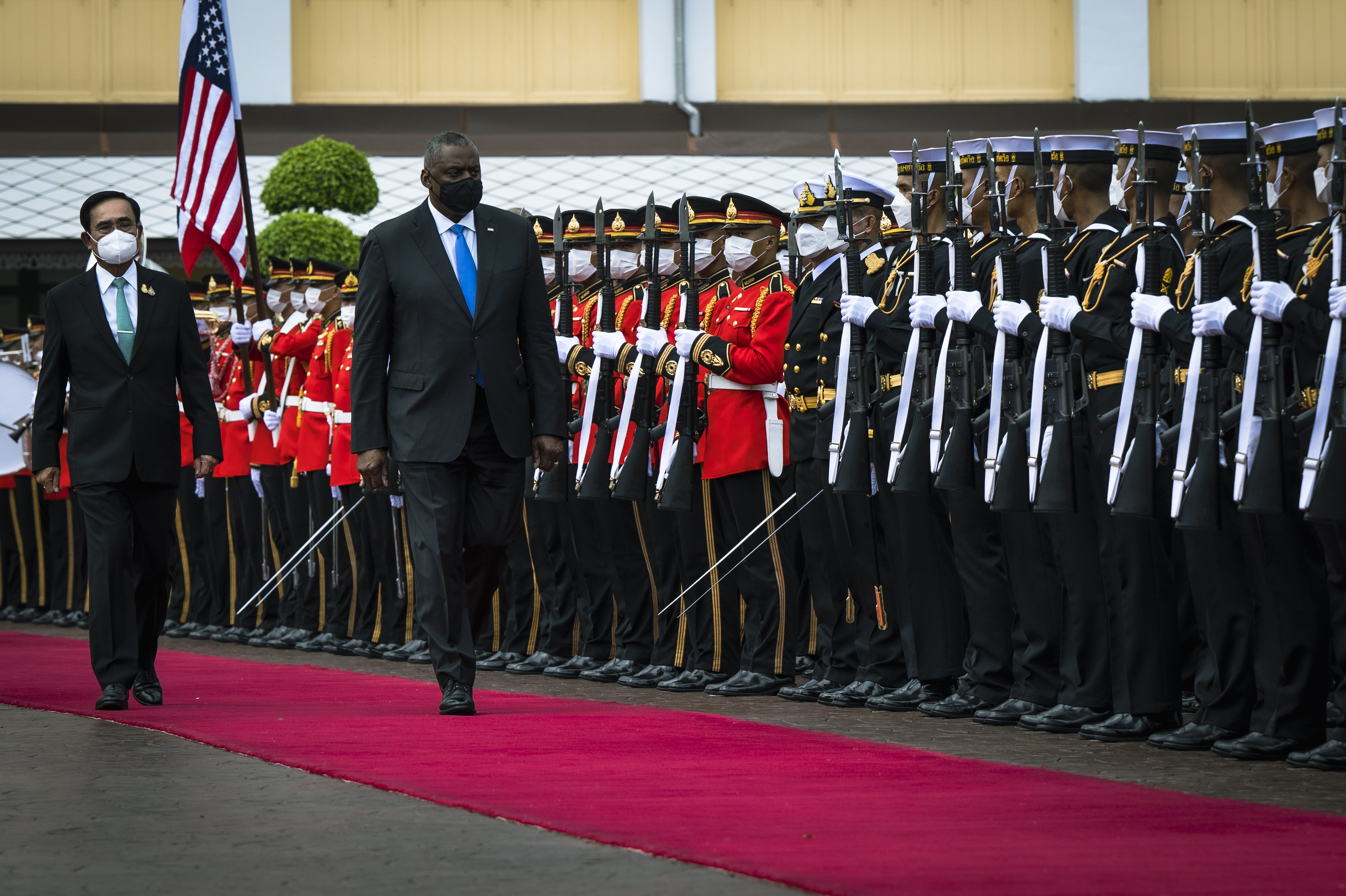
Prayut with U.S. Secretary of Defense Lloyd J. Austin III, 2022

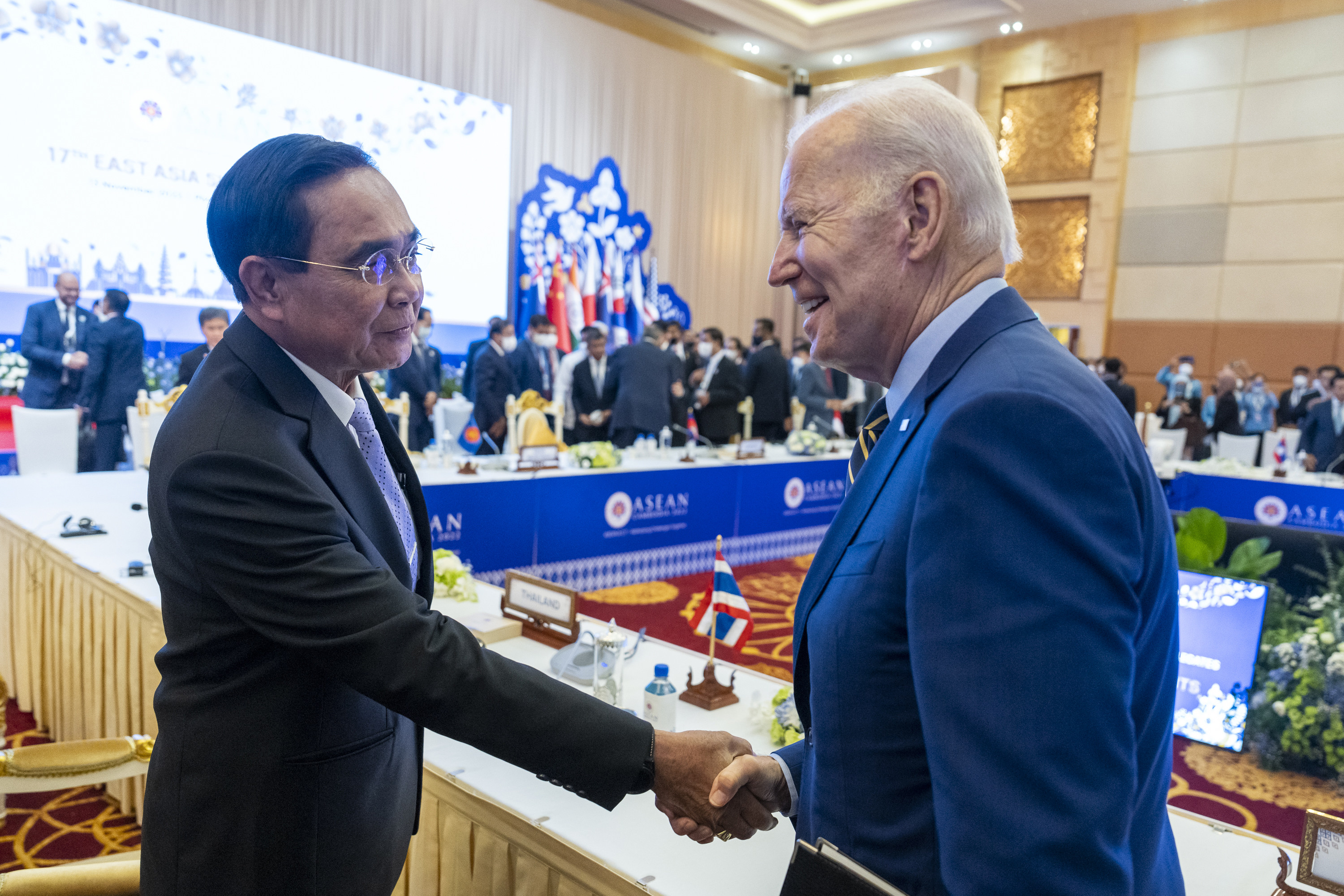
Prayut with U.S. President Joe Biden, East Asian Leaders Summit, 2022

A 2019 Human Rights Watch reported that as the newly elected government of Prayut assumed power in mid-2019, Thailand's human rights record showed no signs of change.

In early 2021, the Thai government, led by Prayut, had adopted a draft law, Draft Act on the Operations of Not-for-Profit Organizations, to regulate non-governmental organization (NGOs). The bill was mentioned by Amnesty International as an effort to silence civil society groups and NGOs.

In September 2021, Nattacha Boonchaiinsawat, a Move Forward Party MP, released videos, voice clips, and documents regarding military operations creating fake social media accounts to operate information warfare against the people. The Internal Security Operations Command, head by Prayut, was also involved in deep monitoring of opposition politicians, seen as Prayut's political enemies, along with Thai activists.

In November 2021, Prayut ordered the Royal Thai Police and the Ministry of Interior to check if Amnesty International had violated any Thai laws following the campaign's support of the repeal of the lèse-majesté law regarding a contentious ruling by the Constitutional Court against the 2020 Thai protests calling for reform of the monarchy. On 1 December, a 28-year-old noodle vendor made headline news by asking Prayut to retire quickly to allow others to perform the duties of his office. She voiced that Thailand needs more development. She was welcomed by people in Ban Dung District in Udon Thani. Later Ban Dung police came to her house, asking to see her so that they could keep a record of her, but she declined to meet them, saying she had done nothing wrong. The police detained her later.

On 4 December, Prayut said "The most important thing today is that we do two things. The government does two things. The first is equality and equal opportunity. Every Thai person must have the opportunity to use a car, use the road, use a bridge, and take advantage of anything from basic utilities. Rich people themselves paid for the tollway. Low-income people also use the route below. They will not be crowded with each other. I think this is equality, access to opportunities, and travel, but today, many things have happened in the past two governments.".

==== Reactivation of lèse-majesté law ====
In June 2020, Prayut told reporters that King Vajiralongkorn had instructed his government not to use the lèse majesté law. At the time, the lèse majesté law had not been used since 2018, with the government preferring to use the sedition law and the Computer Crime Act instead.

However, later in November 2020, the government resumed its use of the lèse majesté law, filing charges against protesters and activists. Sulak Sivaraksa, a Thai royalist scholar, decried Prayut's using the lèse-majesté law and called for Prayut's removal from office. The leading figures of the monarchy reform protests were all detained and awaited trial in 2021, in a series of detainments and releases, some were imprisoned accumulatively for more than 200 days. Under Prayut's government, lèse-majesté trials were held in military courts, which afforded defendants fewer rights than civilian courts, and political opponents were often sentenced to over 30 years in prison for multiple counts of lèse-majesté.

=== Term limit challenge and suspension ===
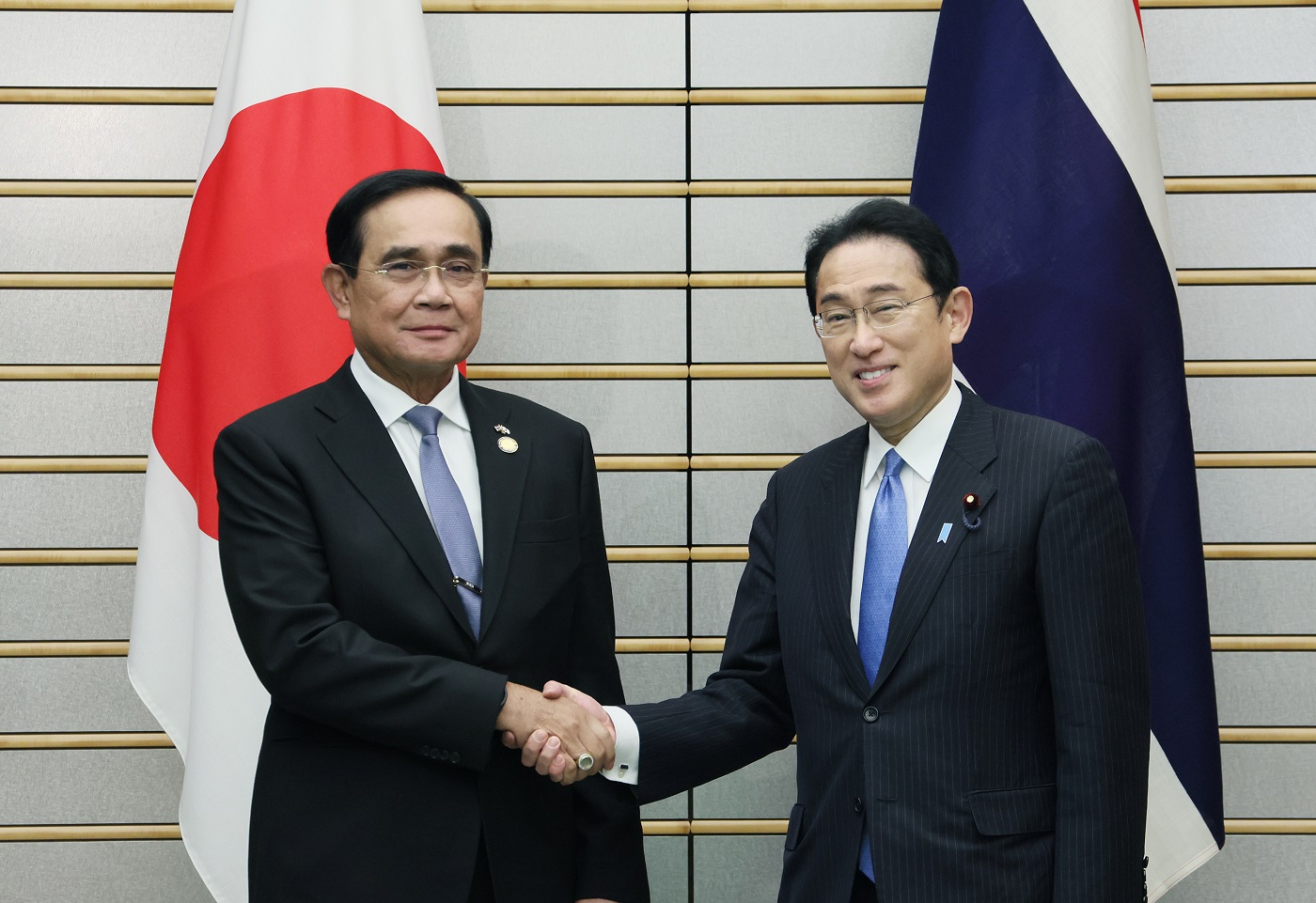
Prayut with Japanese prime minister Fumio Kishida at the Prime Minister's Office, 2022

The 2017 constitution, adopted under Prayut's ruling junta, sets a term limit of eight years for prime ministers. If counting from the beginning of Prayut's premiership while he was head of the military junta after the 2014 coup d'état, this eight-year duration ended on 23 August 2022. Accordingly, opposition politicians made legal challenges to his continued government, while pro-democracy protesters and activists again gathered to demand his resignation. His supporters defended a continued premiership, arguing that the eight-year duration should be counted from when the 2017 constitution went into force or from the beginning of Prayut's civilian administration after the 2019 elections. On 24 August, the Constitutional Court of Thailand declared that Prayut was suspended as prime minister while it reviewed the issue. As the most senior deputy prime minister, Prawit Wongsuwon was made acting prime minister. On 30 September, the court ruled 6–3 that the eight-year period should be counted from the promulgation of the 2017 constitution, allowing him to continue his premiership, potentially until 2025 had he been re-elected following the election in 2023.

=== Assassination attempt ===
On 30 November 2022, a 66-year-old man named Wichan Gaweewong was arrested for attempted assassination after being found with a pen gun at a seminar Prayut was attending. Wichan claimed the weapon belonged to his deceased son.

=== 2023 election and retirement ===
Prayut joined United Thai Nation Party on 23 December 2022 as Chairman of United Thai Nation Party for Guidelines and Strategic Committee to run 2023 Thai general election.

In the 2023 general election, Prayut's coalition won only 15% of the seats. On 11 July 2023, Prayut announced he would retire from politics and resign as a member of the United Thai Nation Party, but he will continue to serve as acting prime minister until a new government is formed to replace him.

On 22 August 2023, Prayut stepped down from the position of prime minister as per the law, following the announcement in the Royal Gazette of the appointment of the new prime minister, Srettha Thavisin, who had received the king's endorsement. On 24 August 2023 Prayut invited Srettha to join the talk to forward the work at the Government House of Thailand. This is the first time in Thailand that there was an inviting of the previous prime minister and the new prime minister to talk about handover of work.

On 31 August 2023, Prayut worked at Government House for the last day as prime minister. There was a farewell ceremony for government officials and media officials at Government House. Prayut began to live and work as former prime minister in a house located in the area of 1st Infantry Regiment, Phaya Thai District, Bangkok.

== Privy Councilor ==
King Vajiralongkorn has appointed Prayut as a Privy Councilor on 29 November 2023.

== Personal life ==
Prayut's nickname is "Tuu" (Thai: ตู่; RTGS: Tu), and he is known as "Big Tuu" (Thai: บิ๊กตู่; RTGS: Bik Tu) or "Uncle Tuu" (Thai: ลุงตู่; RTGS: Lung Tu) by his supporters. The opposition has parodied his name, calling him "Toob" (Thai: ตูบ; literally: Dog), sometimes also has parodied his name as "Fishstop Moon O'Tea" (convert words to English by each syllables). He is married to Naraporn Chan-o-cha, a former associate professor at Chulalongkorn University's Language Institute. She has served as president of the Army Wives' Association since Prayut's selection as army chief in 2010, and is involved with distance learning organisations, for whom she teaches English on a long-distance learning television channel. She claimed to have told her husband to cool down when speaking to the media. Moreover, she told reporters that she was "looking after" her husband, taking responsibility for his clothes, makeup and haircut. According to her, Prayut was dressed "in the English style", wore shoes by Church's and suits tailored at "Broadway". Prayut and Naraporn have twin daughters, Thanya (Thai: ธัญญา) and Nittha (Thai: นิฏฐา), "...twenty-something twin daughters [who] enjoyed brief success a few years ago as a punk-lite pop duo called BADZ—..."

Prayut has stated publicly that he consults a fortune teller, Warin Buawiratlert, regularly. He said that there was no harm in seeking advice. When suffering from fever and aches early in his premiership, he blamed his ills on spells cast by his political enemies and combated the malady with holy water.

According to the Bangkok Post, Prayut has a collection of lucky rings which he wears daily in accordance with that day's activities. He also wears an elephant hair bracelet to ward off bad luck. He has revived the tradition of wearing the phraratchathan, first popularised by Prem Tinsulanonda in the 1980s, and has instructed cabinet members to dress in the phraratchathan at meetings, rather than in Western suits.

During the COVID-19 pandemic, Prayut was fined 6,000 baht for not wearing a face mask in an April 2021 meeting on COVID-19 vaccination. As prime minister, General Prayut earned a salary of 75,900 baht per month, plus a "position allowance" of 50,000 baht monthly. He did not receive a salary as defence minister.

== Royal decorations ==
- Thailand:
  - 2024 – Knight Grand Commander of the Most Illustrious Order of Chula Chom Klao
  - 2010 – Knight Grand Cordon of the Most Exalted Order of the White Elephant
  - 2008 – Knight Grand Cordon of the Most Noble Order of the Crown of Thailand
  - 2023 – Order of Symbolic Propitiousness Ramkeerati (Special Class) - Boy Scout Citation Medal
  - 2024 – King Rama X Royal Cypher Medal, Third Class
  - 1990 – Member of the Rama Medal for Gallantry in Action of the Most Honourable Order of Rama
  - 1986 – Freemen Safeguarding Medal (Second Class, First Category)
  - 1989 – Border Service Medal
  - 1989 – Chakra Mala Medal
- Brunei:
  - 2017 – Recipient of the Sultan of Brunei Golden Jubilee Medal
- United States:
  - 2013 – Commander of the Legion of Merit
- Malaysia :
  - 2012 – The Most Gallant Order of Military Service (P.G.A.T.)
- Singapore :
  - 2012 – Pingat Jasa Gemilang (Tentera)
- Indonesia :
  - 2012 – Army Meritorious Service Star, Utama Class

== See also ==
- List of international prime ministerial trips made by Prayut Chan-o-cha

== Notes ==
Military offices
Preceded by Anupong Paochinda	Commander-in-Chief of the Royal Thai Army; 2010–2014	Succeeded by Udomdej Sitabutr
Political offices
Preceded by Niwatthamrong Boonsongpaisan as Acting Prime Minister	Leader of the National Council for Peace and Order; 2014–2019	Office abolished
Preceded by Yingluck Shinawatra	Prime Minister of Thailand; 2014–2023	Succeeded by Srettha Thavisin
Preceded by Prawit Wongsuwon	Minister of Defence of Thailand; 2019–2023	Succeeded by Sutin Klungsang
Diplomatic posts
Preceded by Lee Hsien Loong	Chair of the ASEAN; 2019	Succeeded by Nguyễn Xuân Phúc
