= Sarayut Jailak =

Thai politician (born 1979)

- ศรายุทธ ใจหลัก

Secretary-General of the People's Party
- Incumbent
- Assumed office 9 August 2024
- Leader: Natthaphong Ruengpanyawut
- Preceded by: Apichat Sirisunthon (Move Forward Party; de facto)

Director of the Move Forward Party
- In office 14 March 2020 – 23 September 2023
- Leader: Pita Limjaroenrat
- Preceded by: Position established
- Succeeded by: Position abolished

Personal details
- Born: 12 December 1979 (age 46) Bangkok, Thailand
- Party: People's (since 2024)
- Other political affiliations: Future Forward (2018–2020); Move Forward (2020–2024)
- Education: Kasetsart University (BEng)
- Occupation: Politician; activist

Sarayut Jailak (Thai: ศรายุทธ ใจหลัก, born 12 December 1979) is a Thai politician who has been the Secretary-General of the People's Party since 2024. He previously served as director of the party's de facto predecessor, the Move Forward Party, from 2020 to 2023.

Born in Bangkok, Sarayut graduated from the Kasetsart University with a bachelor's degree in engineering. He then joined the University Student Federation of Thailand and briefly served as its leader in 2000. Sarayut joined politics in 2018 as a member of the Future Forward Party, and served as a member until the party's dissolution by the Constitutional Court in 2020. Sarayut then joined the Move Forward Party, the reincarnation of the Future Forward Party, and became its director, a role he held until his resignation in September 2023.

In August 2024, the Move Forward Party was dissolved by the Constitutional Court and Sarayut joined the People's Party, the reincarnation of the Move Forward Party and became the party's Secretary-General.

== Career ==
Sarayut was an activist and member of the Student Federation of Thailand. Sarayut is a close friend of Thanathorn Juangroongruangkit, founder of the banned Future Forward Party.
