= Natthaphong Ruengpanyawut =

Thai politician (born 1987)

- ณัฐพงษ์ เรืองปัญญาวุฒิ
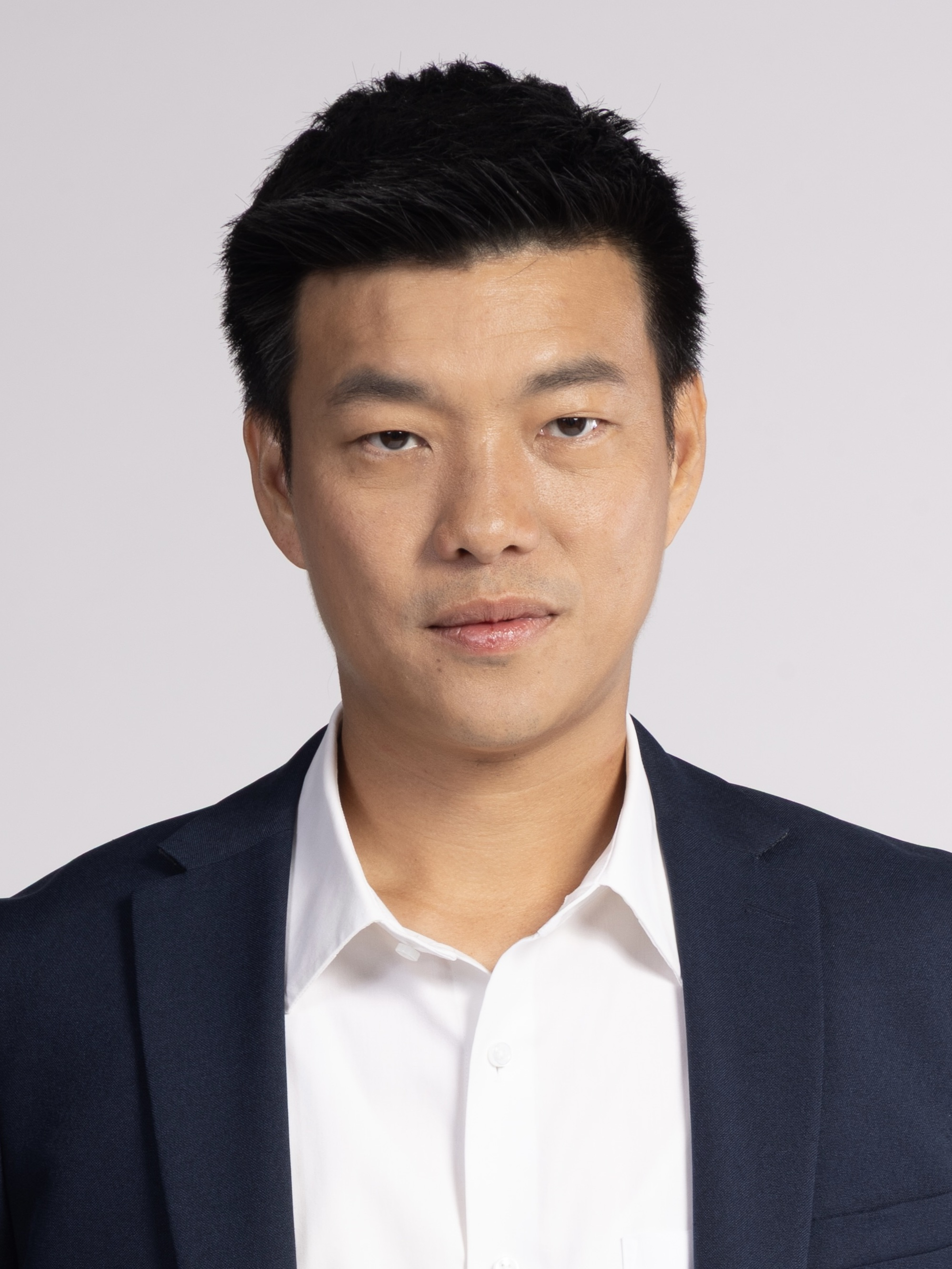
- Official portrait, 2025

Leader of the Opposition
- Incumbent
- Assumed office 25 September 2024
- Monarch: Vajiralongkorn
- Prime Minister: Paetongtarn Shinawatra; Suriya Juangroongruangkit (acting); Phumtham Wechayachai (acting); Anutin Charnvirakul
- Preceded by: Chaithawat Tulathon

Leader of the People's Party
- Incumbent
- Assumed office 9 August 2024
- Preceded by: Chaithawat Tulathon (Move Forward Party; de facto)

Member of the House of Representatives
- Incumbent
- Assumed office 24 March 2019
- Constituency: Bangkok–28 (Bang Khae); Party-list (2019–present)

Personal details
- Born: 18 May 1987 (age 39) Songkhla, Thailand
- Party: People's (since 2024)
- Other political affiliations: Future Forward (2018–2020); Move Forward (2020–2024)
- Spouse: Natthaporn Chan-in
- Education: Chulalongkorn University (BEng)
- Occupation: Politician; programmer; businessman
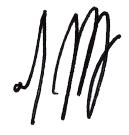
- Signature
- Nickname: Teng (เท้ง)

Natthaphong Ruengpanyawut (Thai: ณัฐพงษ์ เรืองปัญญาวุฒิ, RTGS: Natthaphong Rueangpanyawut; born 18 May 1987) is a Thai politician and businessman who has served as the leader of the Opposition and leader of the People's Party since 2024. He has also been a member of the House of Representatives since 2019.

Born in Songkhla and raised in Bangkok, Natthaphong graduated from Chulalongkorn University with a Bachelor of Engineering degree in computer engineering. He then founded Absolute Management Solutions, a cloud service company where he served as an executive. In 2018, Natthaphong joined the Future Forward Party and the entered politics the following year and was elected to the House of Representatives for Bangkok's 28th Constituency (Bang Khae) in the 2019 general election.

In 2020, Natthaphong joined the Move Forward Party after the Future Forward Party was dissolved by the Constitutional Court. In 2023, he was re-elected to the House of Representatives as a party-list MP in the general election. In April 2024, Natthaphong served on a Move Forward Party seminar for the digital wallet scheme proposed by then–Prime Minister Srettha Thavisin, where Natthaphong raised doubts the readiness of the Tang Rat app. In August of the same year, the Constitutional Court dissolved the Move Forward Party and Natthaphong joined the People's Party and was chosen as party leader on 9 August.

In September 2025, following the removal of Paetongtarn Shinawatra as prime minister, Natthaphong endorsed Anutin Charnvirakul, the leader of the Bhumjaithai Party and the former coalition partner of Paetongtarn's party Pheu Thai, for prime minister, in an exchange for the House of Representatives to be dissolved with a snap general election being held in four months and as well as constitutional amendments. While the People's Party will support the minority coalition government of Anutin in a confidence and supply agreement, Natthaphong has stated that his party will remain in opposition and will also not take up any cabinet portfolio.

== Early life ==
Natthaphong Ruengpanyawut was born on 18 May 1987 in Songkhla. He was given the nickname Teng (Thai: เท้ง, RTGS: Theng, Chinese: 澄). A descendant of ethnic Chinese ancestors bearing the surname Lim (Thai: ลิ้ม, Chinese: 林), he is the fourth child of real-estate tycoon Suchart Ruangpunyawut, president of the Chanuntorn Development Group (a real estate business). Suchart's companies focus mainly around the development of luxury houses, townhouses and condominiums around Thonburi. He completed his secondary education at Taweethapisek School, and graduated with a bachelor's in computer engineering at Chulalongkorn University, both in Bangkok. Natthaphong then established and served as an executive at his cloud service company Absolute Management Solutions Co Ltd following his graduation.

== Political career ==
Natthaphong was elected to the House of Representatives in the 2019 general election after winning Bangkok's Constituency 28 (Bang Khae) for the Future Forward Party, narrowly defeating the Palang Pracharath Party's candidate. As a member of the FFP, he was entrusted by FFP leader Thanathorn Juangroongruangkit with overseeing the party's online platforms. He continued this role and became an MP of the Move Forward Party (MFP) after the FFP was dissolved in 2020.

=== As an MP for Move Forward ===
On 2 November 2022, MFP introduced a bill to the House of Representatives seeking to liberalise and end the oligopoly of the Thai liquor industry, which was narrowly defeated with 177 opposing and 174 in favour. The bill losing by a slim margin prompted Nattaphong to a propose a second vote, which still lost with 196 opposing and 194 in favour. The same day, the Thai government introduced new liquor regulations.

During the 2023 general election, Natthaphong decided to contest the election as a Party List MP. He left the position of MP of Bangkok's Constituency 28 on 20 March. During the election campaign, Natthaphong represented the MFP at an event at Chulalongkorn University on 3 May 2023 where he spoke on how innovation was crucial to ending corruption in Thailand. He argued that innovation would allow the Thai people to better criticise their government, but that innovation could only occur if the government allows it. He was re-elected to the House of Representatives. On 5 July, he submitted an asset declaration to the National Anti-Corruption Commission (NACC) where he and his wife Natthaporn Chan-in declared their assets in total at ฿402.5 million, of which ฿397.3 million belonged to him.

Following the election, the MFP attempted to form a coalition with the Pheu Thai Party and other smaller parties with Pita Limjaroenrat as Prime Minister. Although the MFP was later dropped by Pheu Thai in favour of pro-military parties, Natthaphong was expected to become the Minister of Digital Economy and Society. MFP subsequently became the main opposition party in the House of Representatives.

On 20 April 2024, he served on a MFP seminar discussing the digital wallet scheme proposed by Prime Minister Srettha Thavisin, where he raised doubts the readiness of the Tang Rat app. As the Deputy Secretary-General of the Information and Digital Systems Development Department of the MFP, he was present at the 2024 AI Ethics Exhibition at CentralWorld, Bangkok. At the exhibition, he stated his belief that Thailand should have policies to both promote and regulate the AI industry. Later on in 2024, Natthaphong became the Deputy Secretary-General of the MFP. On 7 July, he announced the party would field 10 to 20 CEO candidates in Provincial Administrative Organisations.

=== Leader of the People's Party and Leader of the Opposition ===
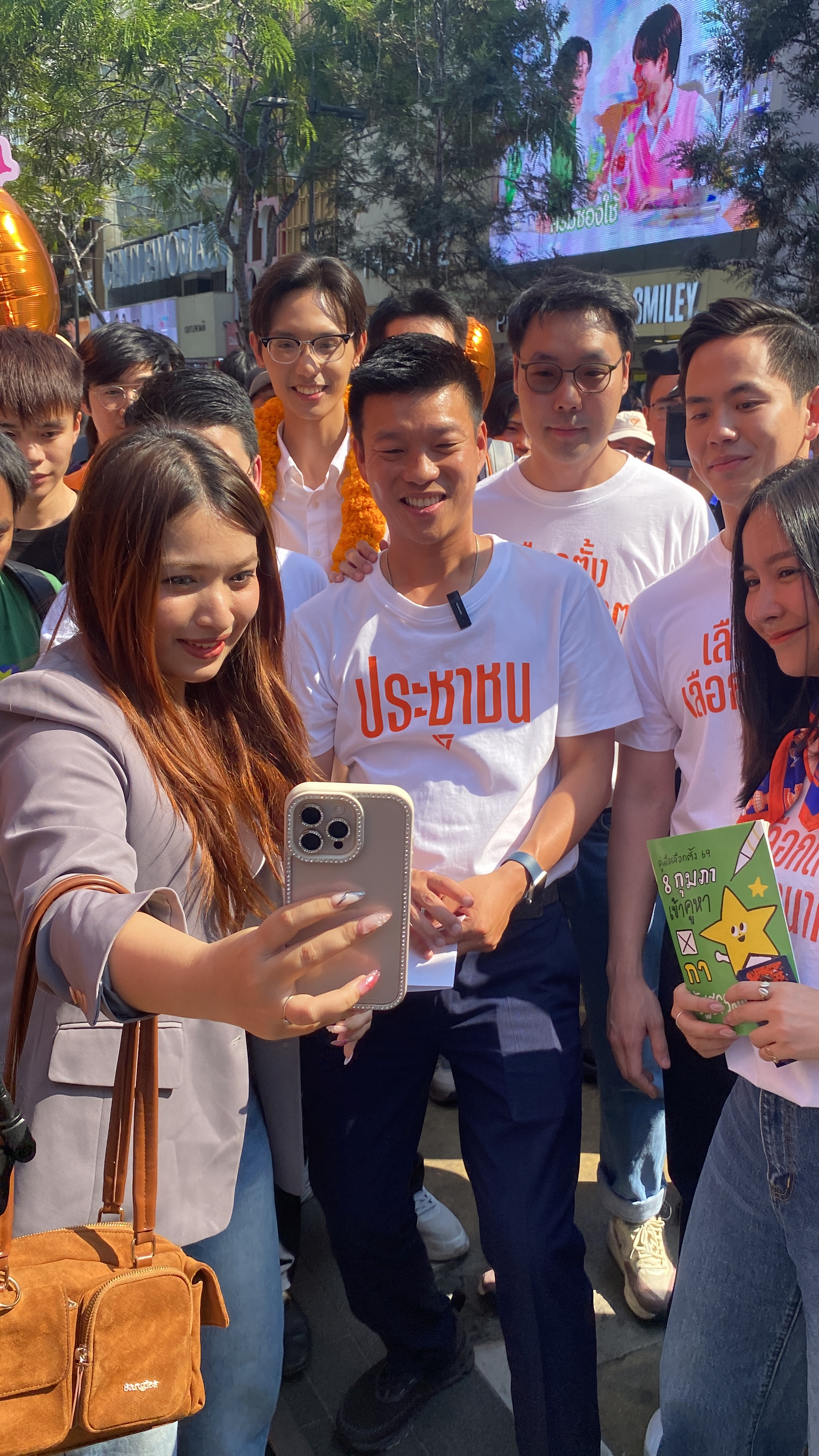
Natthaphong posing for a selfie with a supporter at Siam Square in January 2026.

On 7 August 2024, the nine-judge panel of the Constitutional Court of Thailand voted unanimously among itself to dissolve the Move Forward Party. The decision also included 10-year political bans on 11 current and former party executives including Pita Limjaroenrat, who led the party to the 2023 general election, and Chaithawat Tulathon, leader of the MFP up to its dissolution. However, the remaining 143 former MFP members kept their seats in the House of Representatives and reorganised themselves into a new party, joining and then rebranding the small Thinkakhao Chaovilai Party as the People's Party.

On 9 August, Natthaphong was voted to be the new leader of Move Forward's successor, the People's Party, at the Thai Summit Tower in Bangkok. His election as party leader was unanimous. Alongside Natthaphong, the leadership of the People's Party saw the former Deputy Leader of MFP Sirikanya Tansakun become the Deputy Leader of the People's Party, and former MFP director Sarayut Jailak become Secretary-General of the MFP. The election of Natthaphong as leader came as a surprise to many political observers who had expected Sirkianya to become party leader. She later stated that she never intended to become party leader, and that she had actually nominated Natthaphong to become leader.

After becoming party leader, Natthaphong said that the new party would continue MFP's ideology and that "our mission is to set up the 'change' government for the 2027 election." Despite MFP's push to change Article 112 of the constitution on lèse-majesté laws, Natthaphong said that the People's Party would still continue to push for Article 112 to be amended, though with caution. This pledge was criticised by coalition parties. His support of the MFP's push to change Article 112 continues to put his situation in uncertainty. Two complaints have been filed against 44 former MFP MPs, although five had already been banned as a result of the 7 August decision. On 8 August, NACC Office Secretary-General Niwatchai Kasemmongkol said that the NACC had ordered a probe against the remaining 39 MPs and 5 former for breaching ethical standards by sponsoring the bill to amend Article 112, including Natthaphong. If both the NACC indicts them and the Supreme Court rules against them, it would result in 10-year political bans. Natthaphong said in an interview on 12 August that he wasn't afraid and that he could properly defend himself in the Supreme Court which he said was part of the judicial system whilst the Constitutional Court was a 'political court'. Defending himself, Natthaphong said his support of the bill was limited to him only signing his name to sponsor it and that he didn't participate in anti-monarchist activities.

Natthaphong has also said that the party would aim to win enough seats to form a single-party government, due to the fact that Move Forward was dropped from a coalition with the current ruling Pheu Thai Party when it was attempting to form government after the 2023 election. The People's Party is currently the largest party in the House of Representatives with 143 MPs.

On 25 September 2024, a royal command was issued appointed Natthaphong as the Leader of the Opposition. The royal command was published in the Royal Gazette on 1 October 2024, and there was a royal command response ceremony the same day.

== Personal life ==
Nattapong is Married and became a vegetarian along with his wife. He is a supporter of Manchester United and enjoyed watching football as a child.

Political offices
Preceded by Chaithawat Tulathon	Leader of the Opposition; 2024–present	Incumbent
Party political offices
Preceded by Chaithawat Tulathon as Leader of the Move Forward Party	Leader of the People's Party; 2024–present	Incumbent
