= Kunthida Rungruengkiat =

Thai politician

- กุลธิดา รุ่งเรืองเกียรติ
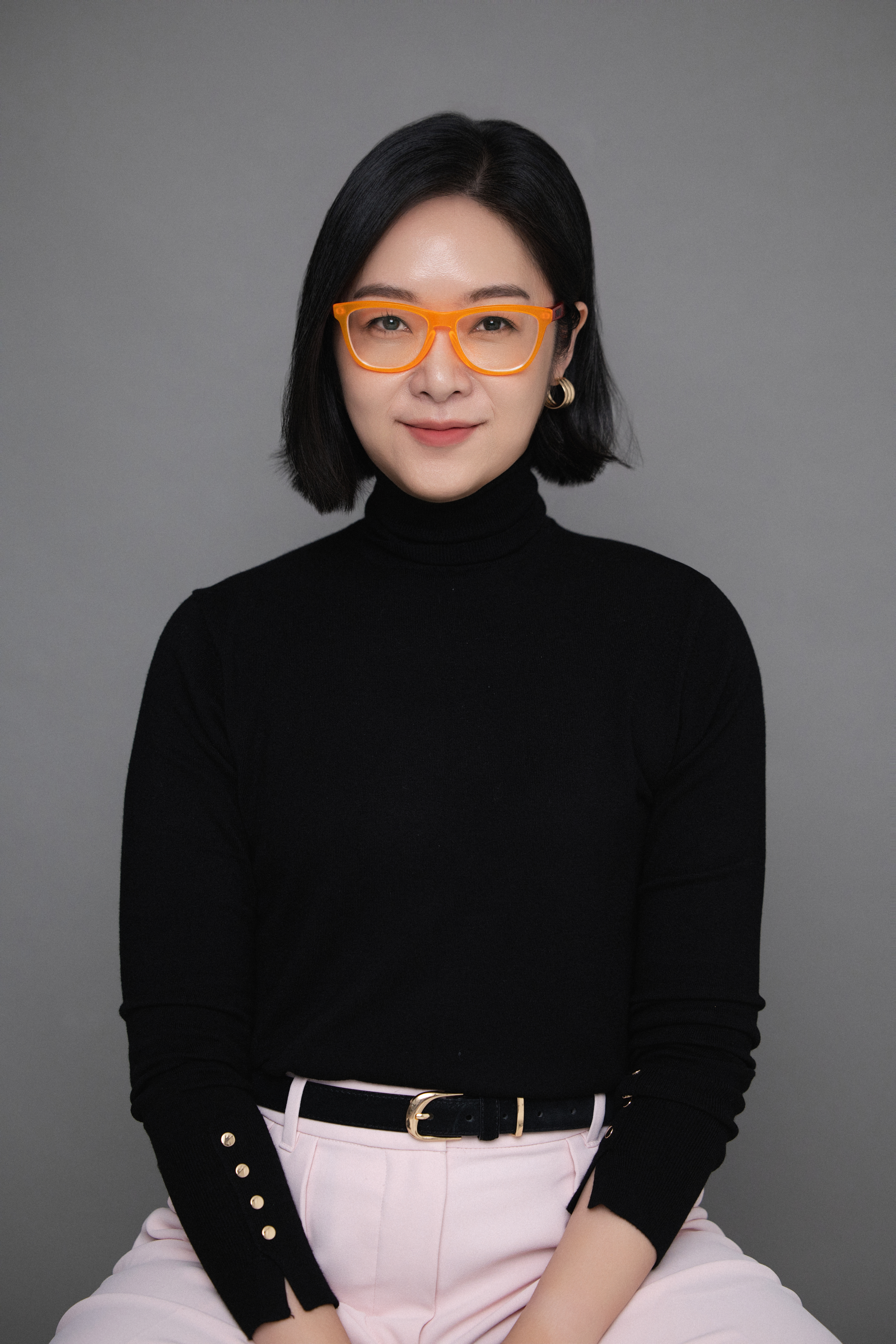

Member of the House of Representatives of Thailand
- In office 24 March 2019 – 21 February 2020

Kunthida Rungruengkiat (Thai: กุลธิดา รุ่งเรืองเกียรติ) is a Thai academic and former politician who served as deputy leader of the Future Forward Party (FFP) and member of the Thai House of Representatives. Following the party's dissolution in 2020, Kunthida was banned from politics for 10 years by the Constitutional Court.
