= Eugénie Mérieau =

French political scientist and constitutionalist

- Born: 1986 (age 39–40)
- Occupation: Academic
- Spouse: Piyabutr Saengkanokkul

Eugénie Mérieau (born 1986) is a French political scientist and constitutionalist, specialising in politics of Thailand, authoritarian constitutionalism and legal transplants. She is an associate professor (maître de conférences) of Public Law at the Paris 1 Panthéon-Sorbonne University.

== Life and work ==
Mérieau studied law at the Paris 1 University (Panthéon-Sorbonne), Political Science at the Sciences Po, and Thai studies at the National Institute for Oriental Languages and Civilizations (INALCO) in Paris. She worked as a researcher at the King Prajadhipok's Institute in Bangkok, consultant for the Asia-Pacific Office of the International Commission of Jurists, research fellow at Sciences Po in Paris and Thammasat University in Bangkok, as well as visiting scholar at the Centre for Asian Legal Studies, National University of Singapore. In 2017 she completed her political sciences Ph.D. at INALCO with a thesis on "Thai Constitutionalism and Legal Transplants: a study of Kingship" which won the 2018 Best Dissertation in Law and Politics prize of the Chancellery of the Universities of Paris.

From 2017 to 2019 she was a research fellow at the Alexander von Humboldt Chair of Comparative Constitutionalism, University of Göttingen. In 2019–2020, she was a visiting researcher at the Institute for Global Law and Policy (IGLP), Harvard Law School, and subsequently a post-doctoral fellow at the Centre for Asian Legal Studies, National University of Singapore. She has commented on the political situation and developments in Thailand for international media, including The Conversation, The New York Times, and The Atlantic.

In 2021, she was appointed maître de conférences (associate professor) at the Sorbonne Law School, Paris 1 University, where she teaches constitutional law. Her research interest is focused on illiberal constitutionalism, globalisation of law, rule of law and state of emergency, epistemology and methology of comparative law, as well as Asian constitutional laws.

Eugénie Mérieau is married to the Thai constitutional law scholar and politician Piyabutr Saengkanokkul.

== Criticism ==
In a review of Mérieau's work Thaïlandais. Lignes de vie d’un peuple, social anthropologist Bernard Formoso criticised her choice of portrayed personalities as "highly partisan" and accused her to convey her own ideological convictions as well as Eurocentrism.

Eugénie Mérieau is one of the promoters in France of the conspiracy theory of the Deep State. She applied it for the first time in the case of Thailand in an article published in the Journal Contemporary Asia. She says to agree with Donald Trump on the existence of a Deep State in the United States.

In her various interventions in relation to Thailand, most of the time she fails to tell the audience that she is married to the Thai politician Piyabutr Saengkanokkul and the conflicts of interests she might be in.

On the French Youtube Channel "Le Média" close to La France Insoumise party, Eugénie Mérieau criticized the contradictions between western values of universalism, human rights and the practice of states of emergency. She concluded her intervention by considering that Xi Jinping's China is not a power having imperialist perspectives and that Western countries constitute a genuine "axis of evil".

== Publications (selection) ==
- Les Chemises rouges de Thaïlande [The Red Shirts of Thailand]. IRASEC. 2013.
- (editor) The Politics of (No) Elections in Thailand: Lessons from the 2011 General Election. White Lotus Press. 2016.
- Mérieau, Eugénie (2016). "Thailand's Deep State, Royal Power, and the Constitutional Court (1997–2015)". Journal of Contemporary Asia. 46 (3): 445–466. doi:10.1080/00472336.2016.1151917.
- Marco Bünte; Björn Dressel, eds. (2017). The legal–military alliance for illiberal constitutionalism in Thailand. Routledge. pp. 140–159.
- Le constitutionnalisme thaïlandais au prisme de ses emprunts étrangers : une analyse de la fonction royale [Thai Constitutionalism and Legal Transplants: a study of Kingship]. Institut Universitaire Varenne. 2018.
- "Buddhist Constitutionalism in Thailand: When Rājadhammā Supersedes the Constitution". Asian Journal of Comparative Law. 14: 283–305. 2018.
- La dictature, une antithèse de la démocratie ? 20 idées reçues sur les régimes autoritaires [Dictatorship, an antithesis of democracy? 20 preconceived ideas about authoritarian regimes]. Le Cavalier Bleu. 2019.
- Helena Alviar Garcia; Günter Frankenberg, eds. (2019). French authoritarian constitutionalism and its legacy. Edward Elgar Publishing. pp. 185–208.
- "Thailand's Lèse-Majesté Law: On Blasphemy in a Buddhist Kingdom". Buddhism, Law and Society. 4: 53–92. 2019.
- Constitutional Bricolage: Thailand's Sacred Monarchy vs. The Rule of Law. Hart Publishing. 2021.
