= Worachet Pakeerut =

Thai legal scholar

Worachet Pakeerut (Thai: วรเจตน์ ภาคีรัตน์, RTGS: Worachet Phakhirat, IPA: [wɔː.rá.t͡ɕèːt pʰaː.kʰiː.rát]; born 8 August 1969) is a Thai legal scholar specialising in constitutional and administrative law and a professor at the Faculty of Law, Thammasat University.

== Education ==
Worachet was born in Phra Nakhon Si Ayutthaya Province, where his father was a railway station master. He completed high school at the prestigious Triam Udom Suksa School in Bangkok before studying law at Thammasat University from which he graduated with an honours degree. In 1988, he served as deputy president of his university's student council. The Thai Bar Association admitted him to the bar in 1992. He continued his studies at the University of Göttingen in Germany, completing the Magister Juris programme in 1994 with a thesis about the clausula rebus sic stantibus in administrative contract law. He started teaching as a lecturer at the Faculty of Law, Thammasat University, but returned to Göttingen to complete his doctoral studies. Worachet was conferred a Doctor of Laws title in 1999. His thesis about the development of the legal doctrine of the "administrative law contract" (Die Entwicklung der Dogmatik des verwaltungsrechtlichen Vertrages) was graded summa cum laude. Once again, he returned to Bangkok to be appointed associate professor at Thammasat University.

== Career ==
Worachet published a number of textbooks about administrative and constitutional law. Since September 2010, he has made public appearances as the most prominent spokesman of the Nitirat (นิติราษฏร์; literally "Law for the People") group—also known as "Enlightened Jurists"—an association of law lecturers who campaign for constitutional reform and a change of Thailand's lèse majesté law (article 112 of the Thai criminal code), proposing to reduce the maximum penalty of currently 15 years, limiting the right to press charges to the office of the king's private secretary (instead of everyone) and excluding constructive criticism from the offence's definition. In late-February 2012, Worachet was assaulted by two men on the parking lot of Thammasat University's downtown campus, who later declared they disagreed with his campaign for a change of article 112. Worachet and his group have repeatedly criticised Thailand's Constitutional Court, accusing it of political interventions and exceeding its authority. They have even demanded the replacement of the tribunal completely.

After the Thai coup d'état of 22 May 2014, Worachet was summoned to report to the military junta National Council for Peace and Order (NCPO), but failed to do so within allotted time, as he was abroad. Upon his return to Thailand, he was taken into custody for defying the junta's orders, but released on bail on the same day. In July 2014, the Thammasat University council promoted Worachet from associate professor to a full professorship. His promotion to the professorship was endorsed by the Civil Service Commission on 27 October 2016 and received the royal assent from King Rama X on 5 April 2017, with retroactive effect as from 12 June 2013. The proclamation on his promotion was countersigned by NCPO deputy leader Air Chief Marshal Prajin Jantong.

Worachet is a member of the supervisory board of the German-Southeast Asian Center of Excellence for Public Policy and Good Governance (CPG).

== Works ==
- Prawattisat Khwamkhit Nitipratya (The History of Legal Philosophy)

== Academic rank ==
- 2013: Professor of public law, Thammasat University
