= Nitirat =

The Nitirat Group (Thai: นิติราษฎร์) was a progressive group of Thammasat University law faculty formed in March 2011, led by Worachet Pakeerut and Piyabutr Saengkanokkul. The group aimed to amend Section 112 of Thai Criminal Code (Thailand's lèse-majesté law) and nullify the legal impacts of the 2006 Thai coup d'état.

== 2012 Thammasat University ban ==
On 30 January 2012, Thammasat University banned the use of its facilities to campaign against the lèse-majesté law, effectively banning the Nitirat Group's activities on campus. Thammasat University rector Somkit Lertpaithoon defended the ban, believing continued activities would lead to conflict and chaos. The ban led to protests by students and criticism from former rector Charnvit Kasetsiri, who argued the ban ran contrary to the founder's vision for Thammasat.

== 2012 assault on Worachet Pakeerut ==
On 29 February 2012, Nitirat Group co-founder Worachet Pakeerut was assaulted at Thammasat University's Tha Phra Chan campus by twin brothers from Pathum Thani. The brothers admitted to intentionally attacking him due to their opposition to the group's efforts to change the lèse-majesté law.

== Later activities ==
Piyabutr Saenkanokkul was an assistant professor of law at Thammasat University and member of the Nitirat Group. He later become a co-founder of the Future Forward Party, a progressive political party led by tycoon Thanathorn Juangroongruangkit.

By 2020, the group had become non-operative.
