= Piyabutr Saengkanokkul =

Thai academic and politician (born 1979)

- ปิยบุตร แสงกนกกุล
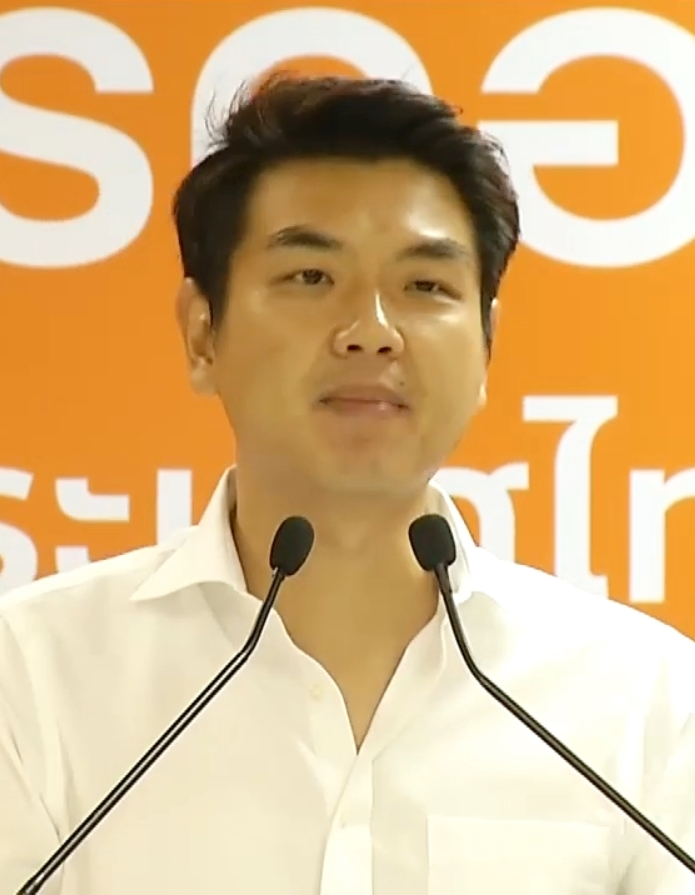
- Piyabutr Saengkanokkul in 2019

Secretary-General of the Future Forward Party
- In office 27 May 2018 – 21 February 2020
- Leader: Thanathorn Juangroongruangkit
- Preceded by: Position established
- Succeeded by: Chaithawat Tulathon (Move Forward Party; de facto)

Member of House of Representatives
- In office 24 March 2019 – 21 February 2020

Personal details
- Born: 23 October 1979 (age 46) Bangkok, Thailand
- Party: Future Forward (2018–2020)
- Other political affiliations: Progressive Movement (since 2020)
- Spouse: Eugénie Mérieau (m. 2016)
- Education: Thammasat University; University of Nantes; Toulouse University (Ph.D.)
- Occupation: Politician; academic; associate professor; activist

Piyabutr Saengkanokkul (Thai: ปิยบุตร แสงกนกกุล, RTGS: Piyabut Saengkanokkun, Thai pronunciation: [pìyábùt sɛ̌ːŋkànòkkūn], born 23 October 1979) is a Thai socialist academic, associate professor, former politician, and Secretary-General of the Progressive Movement, a socio-political group. He served as a member of the Thai House of Representatives and was the first and only Secretary-General for the Future Forward Party, which he co-founded in 2018. Prior to his political career, Piyabutr was an associate professor at the Faculty of Law, Thammasat University. He has worked as a constitutional law professor for more than 16 years. In 2020, he was banned from national politics by the Constitutional Court.

== Early life and academic career ==
Piyabutr was born on 23 October 1979 into a lower middle-class Thai Chinese family, the third of four children. Piyabutr graduated secondary school at Assumption College and studied for his bachelor's degree at the Faculty of Law, Thammasat University, graduating with second class honors. He received a scholarship from the French government to study for his master's and doctoral degrees. Piyabutr graduated with a master's degree in public law and environmental law from the University of Nantes and a PhD with Très honorable avec félicitations honours from the University of Toulouse.

Piyabutr became an assistant professor at the Faculty of Law, Thammasat University. He was also a member of Nitirat, a group of Thammasat law professors who campaigned for various ideas considered radical in Thai politics, such as amending the country's lèse majesté laws.

== Political career ==
Piyabutr resigned from his academic career at Thammasat University to create, with Thanathorn Juangroongruangkit, the Future Forward Party, with an aim towards promoting democracy in Thailand and opposing the military junta. During the party's first meeting, he was elected secretary-general. In the 2019 Thai general election, Piyabutr was second on the Future Forward's list of party-list candidates and became a member of the lower house as Future Forward were allocated fifty party-list seats.

In his mandatory disclosure of assets to the National Anti-Corruption Commission (NACC), Piyabutr reported assets of 7.7 million baht.

Piyabutr was banned from politics for 10 years after the Future Forward Party was dissolved by a Constitutional Court ruling on 21 February 2020, which said that the party was in violation of election laws regarding donations to political parties.

== Political activist ==
In 2020, Piyabutr and other committee formed the Progressive Movement, an NGO, after the party was dissolved, in which he became a secretary general. During the monarchy-reform movements in 2020–2021, he supports young protesters and gives out series of political speeches. Same year, he cited Italian Marxist thinker Antonio Gramsci's idea as main key to established Future Forward Party. In June 2022, he was accused of lèse-majesté by Thepmontri Limpaphayom, an ultra-royalist. Piyabutr vowed to continue as a monarchy-reform acitivist. On 16 April 2024, he posted on his Facebook account by citing Antonio Gramsci and Vladimir Lenin that sustainable revolution have to establish dictatorship of the proletariat council in both parliament and extra-parliamentary

== Personal life ==
Piyabutr is married to Eugénie Mérieau, a French academic.
