= Elections in Thailand =

Some parts of the Government of Thailand are selected through democratic elections. These include the House of Representatives of Thailand, (which combines with the appointed Senate of Thailand to create the National Assembly of Thailand), local Administrations, Governorship of Bangkok and national referendums. Thailand has so far had 29 general elections since 1933; the last election was in 2026. Voting in elections in Thailand is compulsory. All elections in Thailand are regulated by the Election Commission of Thailand.

== Latest election ==
Party	Party-list			Constituency			Total seats	+/–
Party	Votes	%	Seats	Votes	%	Seats	Total seats	+/–
People's Party	11,043,309	30.56	32	8,868,301	24.32	88	120	–31
Bhumjaithai Party	6,468,073	17.90	19	10,776,164	29.55	173	192	+121
Pheu Thai Party	5,575,456	15.43	16	6,263,994	17.18	58	74	–67
Democrat Party	3,941,928	10.91	11	2,186,565	6.00	10	21	–4
Economic Party	1,133,055	3.14	3	402,226	1.10	0	3	+3
United Thai Nation Party	766,078	2.12	2	322,404	0.88	0	2	–34
Pheu Chart Thai Party	680,256	1.88	2	538	0.00	0	2	+2
Kla Tham Party	648,662	1.79	2	4,112,457	11.28	56	58	New
Ruam Jai Thai Party	435,225	1.20	1	2,956	0.01	0	1	+1
Prachachat Party	428,848	1.19	1	309,654	0.85	4	5	–4
New Party	314,430	0.87	1	892	0.00	0	1	0
Thai Subthawee Party	305,565	0.85	1	2,646	0.01	0	1	New
New Democracy Party	256,221	0.71	1	24,075	0.07	0	1	0
New Dimension Party	247,365	0.68	1	1,310	0.00	0	1	+1
Thai Pakdee Party	246,823	0.68	1	33,350	0.09	0	1	+1
Thai Sang Thai Party	202,626	0.56	1	150,285	0.41	1	2	–4
People's Power Party	197,510	0.55	1	2,058	0.01	0	1	New
Thai Liberal Party	185,705	0.51	1	17,238	0.05	0	1	0
New Alternative Party	171,061	0.47	1	22,010	0.06	0	1	+1
Thai Ruam Palang Party	166,723	0.46	1	368,904	1.01	5	6	+4
Palang Pracharath Party	141,082	0.39	1	501,061	1.37	4	5	–35
Movement Party	117,078	0.32	0	33,315	0.09	0	0	New
Thai Kao Mai Party	109,579	0.30	0	109,027	0.30	0	0	0
New Palangdharma Party	90,255	0.25	0	86	0.00	0	0	0
New Opportunity Party	80,103	0.22	0	190,007	0.52	1	1	New
Power Thai Party	72,193	0.20	0	306	0.00	0	0	0
Thai Citizen Party	70,567	0.20	0	22,648	0.06	0	0	0
Rak Chart Party	68,592	0.19	0	16,753	0.05	0	0	New
Thai Population Party	64,251	0.18	0	428	0.00	0	0	0
Thai Prompt Party	61,958	0.17	0	6,007	0.02	0	0	0
Futurise Thailand Party	59,873	0.17	0	246	0.00	0	0	New
Thai Teachers for People Party	56,224	0.16	0	180	0.00	0	0	–1
Nation Building Labour Party	54,437	0.15	0	8,604	0.02	0	0	0
Thaichana Party	52,192	0.14	0	1,421	0.00	0	0	0
Thai Progress Party	50,880	0.14	0	1,825	0.01	0	0	0
Party of Thai Counties	47,044	0.13	0	1,796	0.00	0	0	–1
Vision Mai Party	43,439	0.12	0	10,361	0.03	0	0	New
Fair Party	40,509	0.11	0	7,003	0.02	0	0	–1
Klong Thai Party	37,088	0.10	0	390	0.00	0	0	0
Thailand's Future Party	30,341	0.08	0	2,279	0.01	0	0	0
Thai People's Party	28,458	0.08	0	50,178	0.14	0	0	0
Party for the Country	24,668	0.07	0	11,872	0.03	0	0	New
Green Party	24,193	0.07	0	1,066	0.00	0	0	0
Palang Thai Rak Chart Party	22,321	0.06	0	1,611	0.00	0	0	0
Thai Morality Party	21,838	0.06	0	1,609	0.00	0	0	0
Thai Social Democratic Party	19,637	0.05	0	907	0.00	0	0	0
Independent Party	17,890	0.05	0	4,678	0.01	0	0	0
Prompt Party	17,657	0.05	0	981	0.00	0	0	0
Phue Cheevitmai Party	14,089	0.04	0	369	0.00	0	0	New
Land of Dharma Party	14,046	0.04	0	151	0.00	0	0	0
Fusion Party	13,253	0.04	0	1,927	0.01	0	0	New
Plung Sungkom Mai Party	11,756	0.03	0	658	0.00	0	0	–1
New Aspiration Party	9,517	0.03	0	203	0.00	0	0	0
Farmer Network of Thailand Party	9,092	0.03	0	470	0.00	0	0	0
Thai Ruam Thai Party	8,132	0.02	0	94	0.00	0	0	0
Thai Nation's People Volunteer Party	5,766	0.02	0	176	0.00	0	0	New
Thai Pitak Tham Party	5,662	0.02	0	1,563	0.00	0	0	New
Sammaa Sovereign Party				1,504	0.00	0	0	New
Rakstham Party				191	0.00	0	0	0
Action Coalition Party				113	0.00	0	0	0
None of the above	1,108,123	3.07	–	1,608,250	4.41	–	–	–
Total	36,138,702	100.00	100	36,470,341	100.00	400	500	0 (Note: Seat changes do not sum to zero because two parties that won seats in 2023 did not contest the 2026 election. Chart Thai Pattana (10 seats) fielded no candidates after its leader Varawut Silpa-archa and all ten of its MPs resigned to join Bhumjaithai on 15 December 2025, and Chart Pattana (2 seats) resolved to sit the election out without dissolving.)
Valid votes	36,138,702	95.59		36,470,341	96.46			
Invalid/blank votes	1,669,106	4.41		1,337,452	3.54			
Total votes	37,807,808	100.00		37,807,793	100.00			
Registered voters/turnout	52,933,610	71.42		52,933,610	71.42			
Source: Election Commission

== Suffrage ==
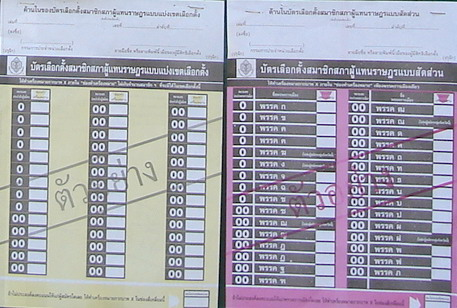
Example ballot paper on show at voting booth, 2007

Elections are held under universal suffrage in accordance with the 2007 Constitution; however, certain restrictions apply:

- The voter must be a national of Thailand; if not by birth, then by being a citizen for 5 years.
- They must be over 18 years old the year before the year the election is held.
- The voter must have also registered ninety days before the election at his constituency.
- Those barred from voting in House elections are: members of the sangha or clergy, those suspended from the privilege (for various reasons), detainees under legal or court orders, and people of unsound mind or of mental infirmity.

Regarding universal suffrage, Thailand (and Siam) has given women right to vote in national election since 1932, and in village election since 1897, which could make Thailand the second country in the world to do so.

== Elections ==
=== House of Representatives ===
The House of Representatives consists of 500 members, of which 350 are directly elected through the first past the post system in which each member represents one "constituency". The other 150 is elected through party lists given to the election commission by the political parties before election day. In the current system as laid out by the 2017 constitution, known as "mixed member apportionment (MMA)", the voter casts a single vote for a constituency MP, which is then also used in the calculation of the party list seats. This differs from the previous 2007 constitution, where the vote for constituency MP and party list MP were separate.

Special elections can be called if the candidate fail to pass the commission's standards (known as yellow-cards) or if a vacancy occurs. The commission also have the authority to annul or ban candidates based on their standards (red-cards). The House has a term of four years but may be dissolved before that time.

=== Senate ===
The 2017 constitution does not include elections for the Senate. The transitional 250 senators that served in the Senate of Thailand from 2018 to 2024 were not elected, but were appointed by the National Council for Peace and Order, the military junta which ruled Thailand from 2014 to the 2019 general election.

In the previous 2007 constitution, the Senate was composed of 150 members. Of these, 76 were directly elected, while 74 members were appointed. Of the elected members, 75 came from the Provinces of Thailand, and one from the Bangkok Metropolitan Area. The election was based on the first past the post system. The last election for the Senate under this system occurred in 2014. Under the 2017 constitution, the Senate is indirectly elected by the candidate pool. The most recent election was held in 2024.

The Senate is a non-partisan chamber and therefore candidates cannot be a member of a political party. Terms are fixed at six years.

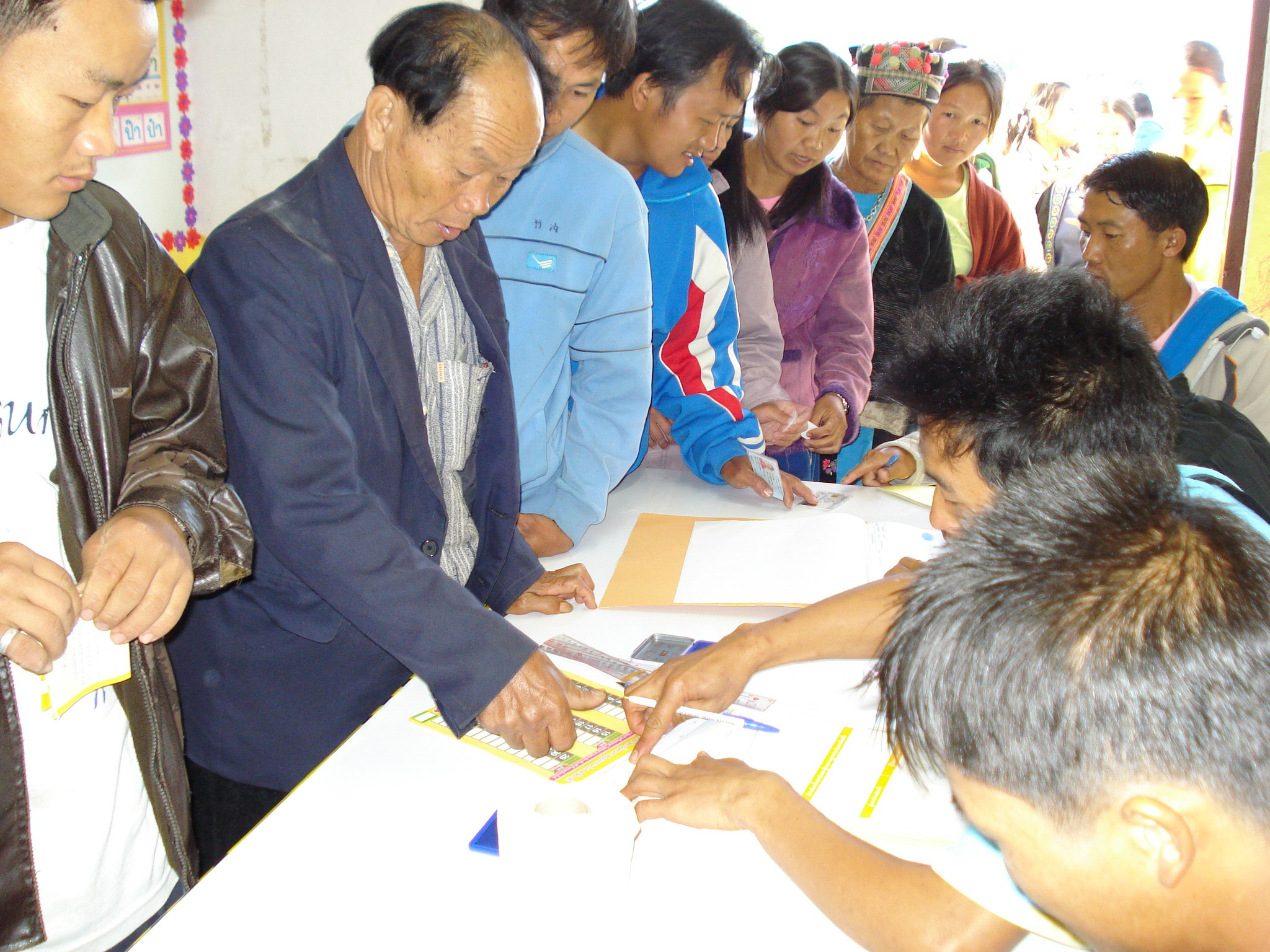
Election Day during the 2007 general election

=== Local administration ===
There are three different levels of municipalities (Thai: เทศบาล), which all elect their own municipal council and mayor. The municipalities are split into constituencies, which each elect six councillors. The number of constituencies depends on the municipal level.

- thesaban nakhon (city): 4 constituencies, 24 councillors.
- thesaban mueang (town): 3 constituencies, 18 councillors.
- thesaban tambon (subdistrict municipality): 2 constituencies, 12 councillors.

The Tambon Administrative Organizations, a local government similar to the municipalities, also has an elected council and mayor. Every administrative village within the TAO sends two councillors to the council, only if there are less than three villages the number of councillors per villages is increased to reach the minimum size of six councillors. Pattaya as a special administrative area has a council with 24 seats and an elected mayor, same as a city.

Additionally, every province has a province-wide local government named the Provincial Administrative Organization with an elected council and chairman. The size of the council depends on the population of the province.

For all the local governments, the electoral term is four years. If a councillor positions becomes vacant, a by-election is held in the corresponding constituency, if a mayor position becomes vacant, a new election for a four-year term is held. Thus elections for mayor and council are not necessarily on the same date.

=== City of Bangkok ===
==== Councils ====
Bangkok is divided into 50 local district councils, one for every district. The size of these councils differ between 7 and 8. Additionally, there are 61 seats in the Bangkok Metropolitan Council (BMC). The election follow a four-year cycle. The most recent local election was in 2022.

=== Gubernatorial ===
The Governor of Bangkok is the only elected Governor in the country. The Governor holds a four-year renewable term. The election does not coincide with that of the district councils or the BMC. The most recent election for Governor of Bangkok was in 2022.

=== Referendums ===
There has only been three constitutional referendums, in 2007, 2016, and 2026

== Issues ==
There have been many issues especially in recent years concerning elections in Thailand. Accusations of vote buying and blackmail have been most cited. Most accusations leveled concern vote buying, particularly in rural areas where representatives of political parties or district captains are sent out offering up to 2,000 Baht for a vote. Others concern cheating and ballot tampering.

Other issues concern the powers of the Election Commission, an unelected and unaccountable body of five, which has absolute authority to cancel elections at will. It is also the sole arbiter and interpreter of Thai election laws. It has been incredibly active in the last two general elections in annulling and disqualifying candidates.

Voter turnout during elections is not much of a problem in Thailand as voting is compulsory and is one of the responsibilities described in the Constitution a citizen must exercise. Turnout is however much higher during general elections (85% in 2007, 75% in 2019) than they are for Senate (56% in 2008, 43% in 2014) or local elections (54% for Bangkok Governor in 2008).

== List of elections ==
=== General elections ===
Election	Date	Prime Minister appointed by Monarch (during term)	Turnout	Seats	Date of dissolution (D) / expiration of term (E) / coup d'etat (C)	Registered voters	Largest party / Seats Share			Monarch
1st	15 November 1933	Phraya Phahonphonphayuhasena	41.45%	78 of the 156		4,278,231				Prajadhipok (Rama VII)
2nd	7 November 1937	Phraya Phahonphonphayuhasena	40.22%	91 of the 182	(E) 9 December 1937	6,123,239				Prajadhipok (Rama VII)
3rd	12 November 1938	Plaek Phibunsongkhram	35.03%	91 of the 182	(D) 11 September 1938	6,310,172				Ananda Mahidol (Rama VIII)
3rd	12 November 1938	(Khuang Aphaiwong)	35.03%	91 of the 182	(D) 11 September 1938	6,310,172				Ananda Mahidol (Rama VIII)
3rd	12 November 1938	(Thawi Bunyaket)	35.03%	91 of the 182	(D) 11 September 1938	6,310,172				Ananda Mahidol (Rama VIII)
3rd	12 November 1938	(Seni Pramoj)	35.03%	91 of the 182	(D) 11 September 1938	6,310,172				Ananda Mahidol (Rama VIII)
4th	6 January 1946	Khuang Aphaiwong	32.52%	96 of the 192	(D) 15 October 1945	6,431,827				Ananda Mahidol (Rama VIII)
4th	6 January 1946	(Pridi Banomyong)	32.52%	96 of the 192	(D) 15 October 1945	6,431,827				Ananda Mahidol (Rama VIII)
—	5 August 1946	Thawan Thamrongnawasawat	34.92%	82 of the 186	(D) 15 October 1945	5,819,662	Democrat	62	75.61%	Bhumibol Adulyadej (Rama IX)
5th	29 January 1948	Khuang Aphaiwong	29.50%	99 of the 186	(C) 8 November 1947	7,176,891	Democrat	53	53.54%	Bhumibol Adulyadej (Rama IX)
5th	29 January 1948	(Plaek Phibunsongkhram)	29.50%	99 of the 186	(C) 8 November 1947	7,176,891	Democrat	53	53.54%	Bhumibol Adulyadej (Rama IX)
—	5 June 1949	Plaek Phibunsongkhram	24.27%	21 of the 207	(C) 8 November 1947	3,518,276				Bhumibol Adulyadej (Rama IX)
6th	26 February 1952	Plaek Phibunsongkhram	38.95%	123 of the 246	(C) 29 November 1951	7,602,591				Bhumibol Adulyadej (Rama IX)
7th	26 February 1957	Plaek Phibunsongkhram	57.50%	160 of the 283	(E) 25 February 1957	9,859,039	Seri Manangkhasila	86	53.75%	Bhumibol Adulyadej (Rama IX)
8th	15 December 1957	Thanom Kittikachorn	44.07%	160 of the 281	(C) 16 September 1957	9,917,417	Sahaphum	44	27.50%	Bhumibol Adulyadej (Rama IX)
9th	10 February 1969	Thanom Kittikachorn	49.16%	219	(C) 20 October 1958	14,820,180	United Thai People's	75	34.25%	Bhumibol Adulyadej (Rama IX)
10th	26 January 1975	Seni Pramoj	47.18%	269	(C) 17 November 1971	20,242,791	Democrat	72	26.77%	Bhumibol Adulyadej (Rama IX)
10th	26 January 1975	(Kukrit Pramoj)	47.18%	269	(C) 17 November 1971	20,242,791	Democrat	72	26.77%	Bhumibol Adulyadej (Rama IX)
11th	4 April 1976	Seni Pramoj	43.99%	279	(D) 12 January 1976	20,623,430	Democrat	114	42.38%	Bhumibol Adulyadej (Rama IX)
12th	22 April 1979	Kriangsak Chamanan	43.90%	301	(C) 6 October 1976	21,284,790	Social Action	82	27.24%	Bhumibol Adulyadej (Rama IX)
12th	22 April 1979	(Prem Tinsulanonda)	43.90%	301	(C) 6 October 1976	21,284,790	Social Action	82	27.24%	Bhumibol Adulyadej (Rama IX)
13th	18 April 1983	Prem Tinsulanonda	50.76%	324	(D) 19 March 1983	24,224,470	Social Action	92	28.40%	Bhumibol Adulyadej (Rama IX)
14th	27 July 1986	Prem Tinsulanonda	61.43%	347	(D) 1 May 1986	26,160,100	Democrat	100	28.82%	Bhumibol Adulyadej (Rama IX)
15th	24 July 1988	Chatichai Choonhavan	63.56%	357	(D) 29 April 1988	26,658,638	Chart Thai	87	24.37%	Bhumibol Adulyadej (Rama IX)
16th	22 March 1992	Suchinda Kraprayoon	59.24%	360	(C) 23 February 1991	32,436,283	Justice Unity	79	21.94%	Bhumibol Adulyadej (Rama IX)
16th	22 March 1992	(Anand Panyarachun)	59.24%	360	(C) 23 February 1991	32,436,283	Justice Unity	79	21.94%	Bhumibol Adulyadej (Rama IX)
17th	13 September 1992	Chuan Leekpai	61.59%	360	(D) 30 June 1992	1,860,156	Democrat	79	21.94%	Bhumibol Adulyadej (Rama IX)
18th	2 July 1995	Banharn Silpa-archa	62.04%	391	(D) 19 May 1995	37,817,983	Chart Thai	92	23.53%	Bhumibol Adulyadej (Rama IX)
19th	17 November 1996	Chavalit Yongchaiyudh	62.42%	393	(D) 27 September 1996	38,564,593	New Aspiration	125	31.81%	Bhumibol Adulyadej (Rama IX)
19th	17 November 1996	(Chuan Leekpai)	62.42%	393	(D) 27 September 1996	38,564,593	New Aspiration	125	31.81%	Bhumibol Adulyadej (Rama IX)
20th	6 January 2001	Thaksin Shinawatra	69.43%	500	(D) 9 November 2000	42,875,036	Thai Rak Thai	248	49.60%	Bhumibol Adulyadej (Rama IX)
21st	6 February 2005	Thaksin Shinawatra	72.56%	500	(E) 5 January 2005	44,572,101	Thai Rak Thai	377	75.40%	Bhumibol Adulyadej (Rama IX)
22nd	2 April 2006	None	64.77%	500	(D) 24 February 2006	44,909,562	Thai Rak Thai (nullified)	461 (nullified)	92.20% (nullified)	Bhumibol Adulyadej (Rama IX)
23rd	23 December 2007	Samak Sundaravej	72.40%	480	(C) 19 September 2006 (Note: The election was invalidated on 8 May 2006, followed by a coup d'état.)	44,002,593	People's Power	233	48.54%	Bhumibol Adulyadej (Rama IX)
23rd	23 December 2007	(Somchai Wongsawat)	72.40%	480	(C) 19 September 2006	44,002,593	People's Power	233	48.54%	Bhumibol Adulyadej (Rama IX)
23rd	23 December 2007	(Abhisit Vejjajiva)	72.40%	480	(C) 19 September 2006	44,002,593	People's Power	233	48.54%	Bhumibol Adulyadej (Rama IX)
24th	3 July 2011	Yingluck Shinawatra	75.03%	500	(D) 10 May 2011	46,939,549	Pheu Thai	265	53.00%	Bhumibol Adulyadej (Rama IX)
25th	2 February 2014	None	47.72 %	500	(D) 9 December 2013	43,024,042	Invalidated			Bhumibol Adulyadej (Rama IX)
26th	24 March 2019	Prayut Chan-o-cha	74.69%	500	(C) 22 May 2014 (Note: The election was invalidated on 21 March 2014, followed by a coup d'état.)	51,239,638	Pheu Thai	136	27.20%	Vajiralongkorn (Rama X)
27th	14 May 2023	Srettha Thavisin	75.64%	500	(D) 20 March 2023	52,287,046	Move Forward	151	30.20%	Vajiralongkorn (Rama X)
27th	14 May 2023	(Paetongtarn Shinawatra)	75.64%	500	(D) 20 March 2023	52,287,046	Move Forward	151	30.20%	Vajiralongkorn (Rama X)
27th	14 May 2023	(Anutin Charnvirakul)	75.64%	500	(D) 20 March 2023	52,287,046	Move Forward	151	30.20%	Vajiralongkorn (Rama X)
28th	8 February 2026	Anutin Charnvirakul	71.42%	500	(D) 12 December 2025	52,933,610	Bhumjaithai	192	38.40%	Vajiralongkorn (Rama X)

=== Senate elections ===
- 2000 Thai Senate election
- 2006 Thai Senate election
- 2008 Thai Senate election
- 2014 Thai Senate election

== See also ==
- Censorship in Thailand
- Electoral calendar
- Electoral system
