= National Assembly of Thailand =

Bicameral legislature of Thailand

National Assembly รัฐสภา Ratthasapha
- 27th National Assembly

Type
- Type: Bicameral
- Houses: Senate; House of Representatives

History
- Founded: 28 June 1932

Leadership
- Monarch: Vajiralongkorn since 13 October 2016
- President of the National Assembly (Speaker of the House of Representatives): Sophon Saram, Bhumjaithai since 16 March 2026
- Vice President of the National Assembly (President of the Senate): Mongkol Surasajja since 26 July 2024
- Prime Minister: Anutin Charnvirakul, Bhumjaithai since 7 September 2025
- Leader of the Opposition: Natthaphong Ruengpanyawut, People's since 25 September 2024

Structure
- Seats: 700 (200 Senators, 500 MPs)
- Senate political groups: Nonpartisan (200)
- House of Representatives political groups: Government (293): Bhumjaithai (192); Pheu Thai (74); Palang Pracharath (5); Prachachat (5); Economic (3); Pheu Chart Thai (2); Thai Sang Thai (2); United Thai Nation (2); New (1); New Alternative (1); New Democracy (1); New Dimension (1); New Opportunity (1); Ruam Jai Thai (1); Thai Sub Thawee (1); People's Power (1); Supported by (57): Kla Tham (57); Opposition (149): People's (120); Democrat (21); Thai Ruam Palang (6); Thai Liberal Party (1); Thai Pakdee (1); Vacant (1)

Elections
- Senate voting system: Indirect limited voting with self-nomination
- House of Representatives voting system: Parallel voting: First-past-the-post voting (400 seats); Party-list proportional representation (100 seats)
- Last Senate election: 9–26 June 2024
- Last House of Representatives election: 8 February 2026
- Next Senate election: August–September 2029
- Next House of Representatives election: By 25 March 2030

Meeting place
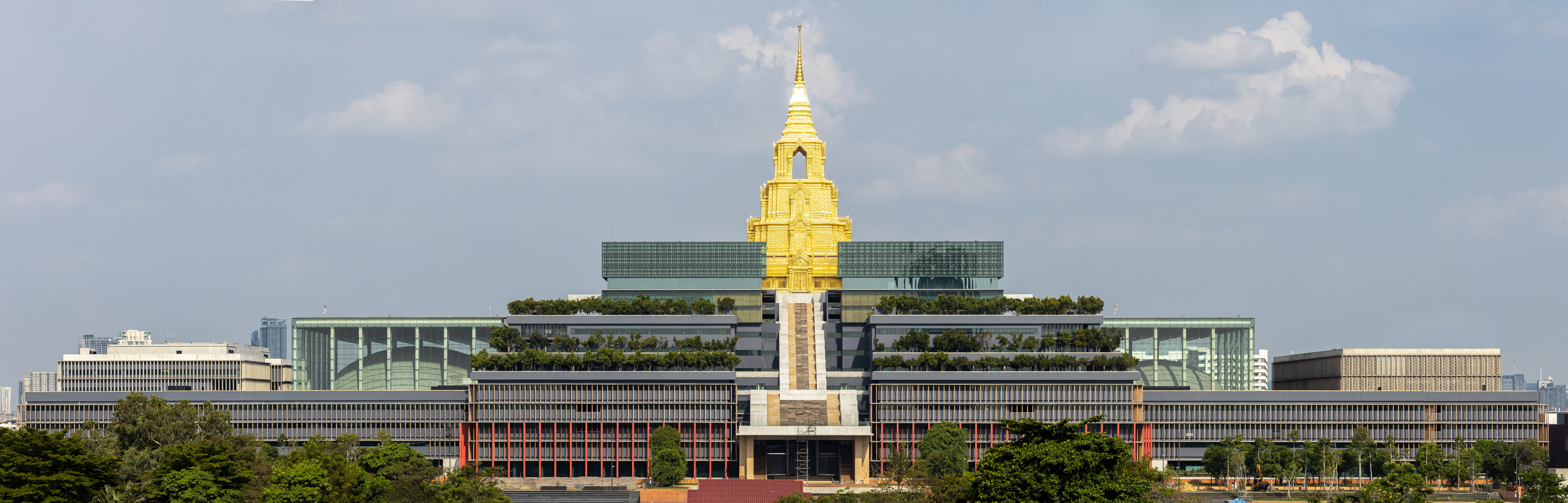
- Sappaya-Sapasathan; Dusit, Bangkok; Thailand

Website
- parliament.go.th

The National Assembly of Thailand (Abrv: NAT; Thai: รัฐสภาไทย, RTGS: Ratthasapha Thai lit. 'Sabha of the Thai Rashtra', pronounced [rát.tʰa.sa.pʰāː tʰāj]) is the bicameral legislative branch of the government of Thailand. It convenes in the Sappaya-Sapasathan, Dusit District, Bangkok.

The National Assembly was established in 1932 after the adoption of Thailand's first constitution, which transformed Thailand from an absolute monarchy to a constitutional monarchy.

During the 2013 political crisis, the House of Representatives was dissolved by Prime Minister Yingluck Shinawatra who called for elections on 2 February 2014 until it was nullified by the Constitutional Court. After the 2014 coup d'état, the National Assembly was replaced by the military-backed, unicameral National Legislative Assembly according to the 2014 constitution.

After the promulgation of the 2017 Constitution in April 2017, the National Assembly was reestablished but the constitution allowed the military National Legislative Assembly to temporarily remain in place until the National Assembly was formed following the 2019 general election.

== Composition ==
The Assembly is a bicameral legislature composed of a Senate and a House of Representatives. Combined, the Assembly has 700 members, 500 of which were elected directly through a general election (500 MPs in the lower house). Others include all 200 members of the Senate being elected indirectly among the candidates. The majority of elections in Thailand follow the first-past-the-post system which is used in the elections for the 400 members of the House of Representatives. The remaining 100 members of the House are elected by party list proportional representation.

Thailand's parliament is overwhelmingly male, at 80.6%. Representation by women is 19.4%, below the Asian average is 20 percent, and the global average for female parliamentarians of 24 percent. All fall short of the 30 percent considered satisfactory by United Nations Women.

=== Senate ===
The upper house is called the Senate of Thailand. The chamber is non-partisan and has limited legislative powers. The Senate is composed of 200 members indirectly voted by candidates from 20 professional and social groups. A term in the Senate is five years. It forbids members from holding any additional office or membership in political parties.

Even though the chamber is mandated to be nonpartisan, many media and analysts have categorized legislators into political factions:

Factions of the 13th Senate
Faction	Person Nominatated for President	Seats (Estimated)
Blue Group, with ties to Bhumjaithai Party	Mongkol Surasatja (president)	>150
New Breeds, which promote liberal and progressive agenda	Nantana Nantavaropas	<30
Unaffiliated/Others	Premsak Piayura	<30

Note: All of these numbers may not be 100% accurate.

=== House of Representatives ===
The lower house is called the House of Representatives of Thailand. The chamber is made up of 400 members from single constituency elections and 100 members from "proportional representation" by party lists, as codified in the 2007 Constitution of Thailand. Thailand's "proportional representation" is, in fact, parallel voting, often described as "mixed member majoritarian" (MMM). This is where the 100 seats are apportioned to political parties in accordance with the "proportional representation" popular vote each party receives. Every eligible voter in Thailand in a general election has two votes. The first is for constituency MP. The second vote is for the party the voter prefers. The second category is then added and the results divided into eight electoral areas. The other 400 seats are directly elected on a constituency basis. The House's term is four years, however, a dissolution can happen at any time.

=== Elections ===
Elections in Thailand are held under universal suffrage; however, some restrictions apply: The voter must be a national of Thailand (if not by birth then by being a citizen for 5 years), must be over 18 years old before the year the election is held, and must have registered 90 days before the election. Those barred from voting in House elections are: members of the sangha or clergy, those suspended from the privilege for various reasons, detainees under legal or court orders, and those who are of unsound mind or of mental infirmity. Voting in Thailand is compulsory.

== Officers ==
The President of the National Assembly of Thailand is an ex officio position occupied by the Speaker of the House of Representatives of Thailand, who upon election as Speaker of the House, will automatically assume office as President of the National Assembly. The Vice President of the National Assembly of Thailand is also an ex officio position occupied by the President of the Senate of Thailand.

== Functions ==
=== Legislation ===
The powers of the National Assembly are enshrined in Chapter 6, Part 7 of the 2007 Constitution of Thailand. The main powers of the National Assembly are its legislative powers. The procedure for an enactment of a bill is as follows:

- A bill can be introduced to the National Assembly for consideration by the Cabinet of Thailand; by a minimum of twenty members of the House of Representatives; by a court (the judiciary); by constitutional independent organs (but only in respect to laws that concern that organization); and by persons who have the right to vote submitting a petition of no fewer than ten thousand in number (a form of direct democracy). If the bill is a money bill its introduction can only be made with the endorsement of the prime minister.
- The bill is then introduced to the House of Representative for debate, amendment, and vote. When the House of Representatives has considered the bill and passed a resolution approving it, the House of Representatives shall submit the bill to the Senate. The Senate must finish the consideration of such bill within 60 days, unless it is a money bill, when consideration must be finished within 30 days.
- After the Senate has finished consideration of a bill, and if it agrees with the House of Representatives, the bill will then proceed to the next stage. If the Senate disagrees with the House of Representatives, then the bill will be withheld and returned to the House of Representatives. If there is an amendment, the amended bill will then be returned to the House of Representatives. If the House of Representatives approves the amendment, the bill will proceed to the next stage. In other cases, each house will appoint representatives (who may or may not be members of the Assembly) in equal number (as may be fixed by the House of Representatives), to constitute a joint committee to consider the bill. The joint committee will then prepare a report and resubmit the bill to both houses. If both houses approve the bill already considered by the joint committee, the bill will proceed to the next stage. If either house disapproves it, the bill will be withheld.
- After a bill has been approved by the National Assembly, the prime minister presents it to the monarch for royal assent within 20 days from the date of the receipt of the bill from the National Assembly. It shall come into force upon its publication in the Royal Gazette.
- If the monarch refuses royal assent, by withholding his signature to a bill and either returns it to the National Assembly or does not return it within 90 days, (a veto), the National Assembly must re-deliberate that bill. If the National Assembly resolves to reaffirm the bill with the vote of not less than two-thirds of the total number of existing members of both houses, the prime minister shall again present the bill to the monarch for signature. If the monarch still does not sign and return the bill within 30 days, the prime minister can cause the bill to be promulgated as an act in the Royal Gazette as if the monarch had signed it. This gives the National Assembly the power to overturn a royal veto.

=== Relationship with the Government ===
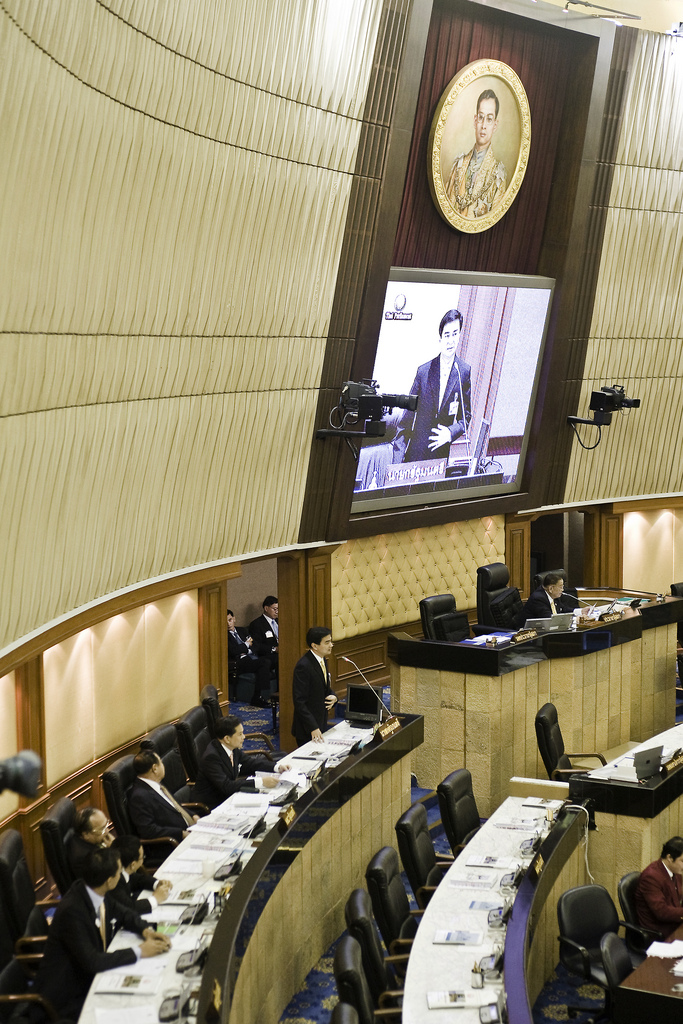
Prime Minister Abhisit Vejjajiva and the Cabinet answer questions in the House of Representatives.

The Government of Thailand, particularly the Cabinet of Thailand is answerable directly to the National Assembly. The constitution mandates that within 15 days of being sworn in, the Cabinet must state its policies to the National Assembly. The National Assembly has the authority to call any minister to appear before it at any time to explain policies or answer questions. This power of scrutiny is important as some members of the Cabinet need not be members of the National Assembly. If they are a member, they can only be from the lower house or the House of Representatives, as the constitution expressly forbids members of the Senate from being members of the Cabinet.

As the prime minister is selected from the ranks of the House of Representatives and elected by the house, the prime minister is therefore directly responsible to the legislature. The National Assembly can compel him to appear before it like any other minister, and force him to explain policies and answer questions, just like any other member of the Cabinet. In reverse the Cabinet also has some powers over the National Assembly. The Cabinet can, according to the constitution, call an emergency session of the National Assembly at any time.

=== Appointment ===
Apart from its legislative and oversight functions, the National Assembly has the power of appointment and removal. The house is given exclusive right to elect the Prime Minister of Thailand. First the candidate must receive the support of one-fifth of all members. Afterwards, a simple majority vote will confirm his appointment which will be made officially by the monarch. The royal assent is then countersigned by the President of the National Assembly.

The Senate is given exclusive powers to advise on the appointment of members of the judiciary and members of independent government organizations. These include judges of the Constitutional Court of Thailand; members of the Election Commission; members of the National Anti-Corruption Commission and the National Human Rights Commission. However, the power to appoint members of the State Audit Commission (including the Auditor General) belongs to the monarch, with a counter signature of the President of the Senate.

The National Assembly has the power to impeach and remove these officers. The prime minister can only be removed by the house in a vote of no confidence. Members of the Cabinet are not appointed by the National Assembly, but they can be removed by the National Assembly in a similar process. This time the vote of no confidence is allowed by both or individual houses. Judges and independent government officers can also be removed by both houses of the National Assembly.

== Term ==
The two houses of the National Assembly have different terms of office. In accordance with the constitution, the Senate is elected to a five-year term, while the House is elected to a four-year term. Overall, the term of the National Assembly is based on that of the House. The National Assembly each year will sit in two sessions: an "ordinary" session and a "legislative" session. The first session of the National Assembly must take place within 30 days of a general election of the House of Representatives. The first session must be opened by the monarch in person by reading a Speech from the Throne. This ceremony is held in the Ananda Samakhom Throne Hall. The monarch may also appoint a representative to carry out this duty. It is also the duty of the monarch to prorogue sessions through a royal decree when the House term expires. The monarch also has the prerogative to call extraordinary sessions and prolong sessions at his discretion.

The National Assembly may host a "joint-sitting" of both houses under several circumstances. These include the appointment of a regent; any alteration to the 1924 Palace Law of Succession; the opening of the first session; the announcement of policies by the Cabinet of Thailand; approval of a declaration of war; the hearing of explanations and approval of a treaty; and the amendment of the constitution.

== Privileges ==
Members of the National Assembly enjoy parliamentary privileges, enshrined in the constitution. These include the "words expressed in giving statements of fact or opinions or in casting the vote" in a joint session of the National Assembly; no member of the House of Representatives or Senate shall, during a session, be arrested, detained, or summoned by a warrant for an inquiry as the suspect in a criminal case unless permission of the house of which he or she is a member is obtained or he or she is arrested in flagrante delicto.

The two houses also retain the privilege to decide its own rules and procedures, committees, quorum of committees, sittings, the submission and consideration of organic law bills and bills, the submission of motions, the consultation, debates, the passing of a resolution, the recording and disclosure of the passing of a resolution, the interpellation, the initiation of a general debate and committee members.

== Parliament House ==
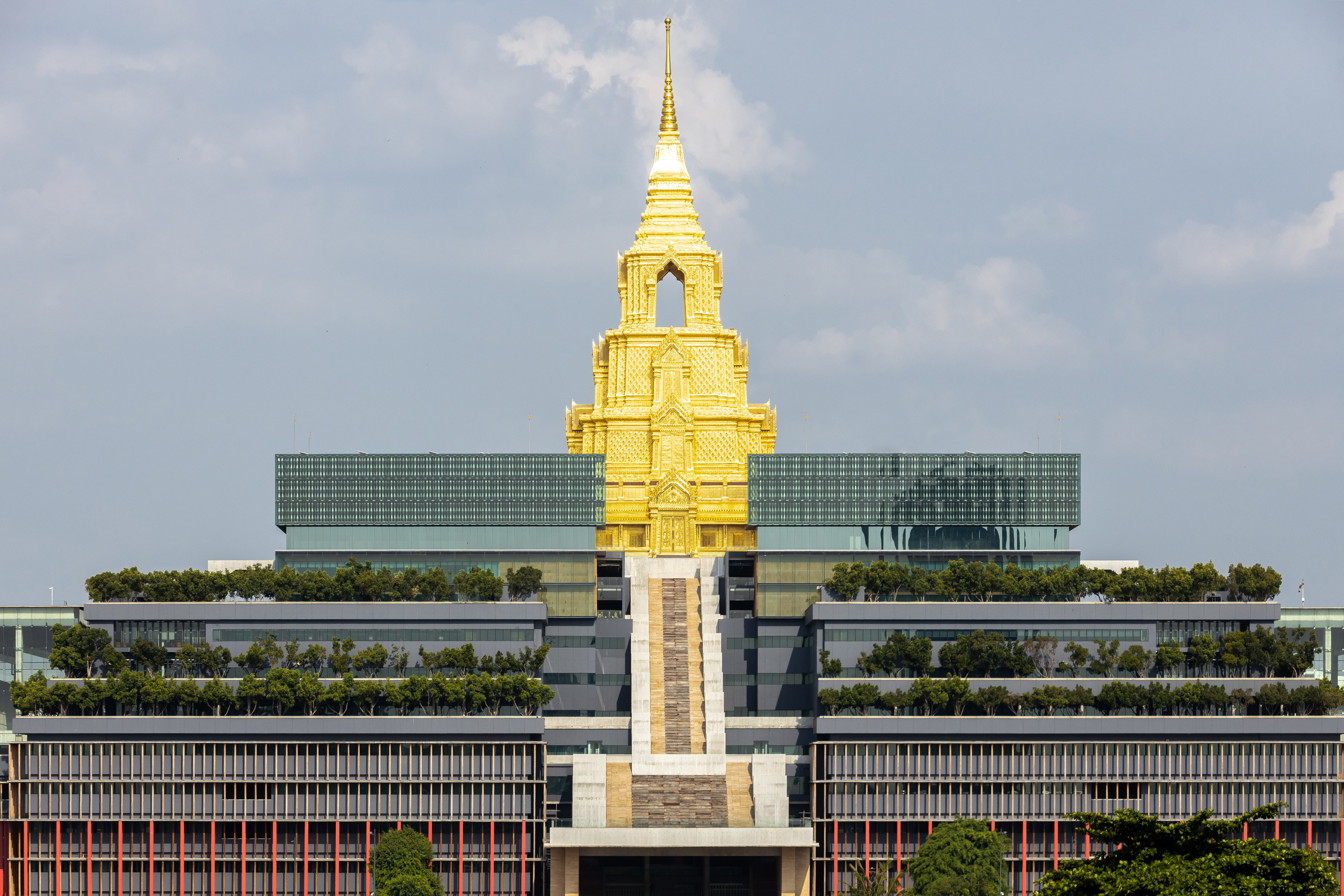
After officially opened on 1 May 2021, Sappaya-Sapasathan is the third and current meeting place of the National Assembly of Thailand

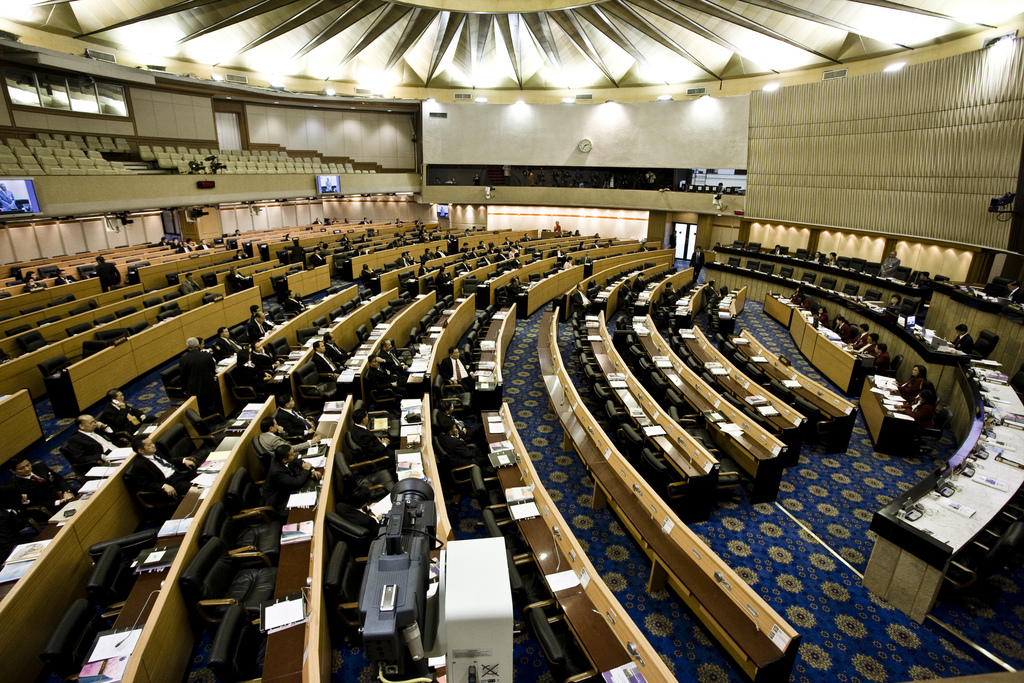
Chamber of the National Assembly at the old Parliament House of Thailand.

From 28 June 1932 to 1974, the legislature met in the Ananta Samakhom Throne Hall. After the first elections to the National Assembly in 1933, King Prajadhipok gave the Throne Hall for the legislature's use. However, through the years the composition of the Assembly increased and the Throne Hall became too small to accommodate all the legislators and its secretariat. Three attempts were made to build a new building. Each failed because the government in power was terminated before a budget could be appropriated.

The fourth time, however, was a success, with the help of King Bhumibol Adulyadej who appropriated to the National Assembly royal land immediately north of the Throne Hall for the site of the new Parliament House. Construction began on 5 November 1970, with a budget of 51,027,360 baht. The new Parliament House complex is composed of three buildings:

- The first building, or the Parliament House, is three storeys containing the meeting chamber for the National Assembly. The chamber is shared by both the Senate and the House. It also contains the offices of the President and Vice President of the National Assembly and other deputy presiding officers.
- The second building is a seven-storey building containing the secretariat and offices of the National Assembly as well as its printing press.
- The third building is a two-storey building used as the Parliament Club, with facilities for Assembly members.

Parliament House was first used on 19 September 1974. The Ananta Samakhom Throne Hall became a national historic building and was returned to the king as part of Dusit Palace. From then on Parliament House became the primary building used for the National Assembly. Only the state opening ceremony is now held in the Throne Hall.

On 29 July 2008, the National Assembly appropriated new funds to construct a new and grander Parliament House. As of December 2008, a site belonging to the Royal Thai Army was identified as the site of a new complex, but no further action has been taken.

In 2013, the National Assembly confirmed that it would be moved to the new Parliament House, Sappaya-Sapasathan.

== History ==
=== Establishment ===
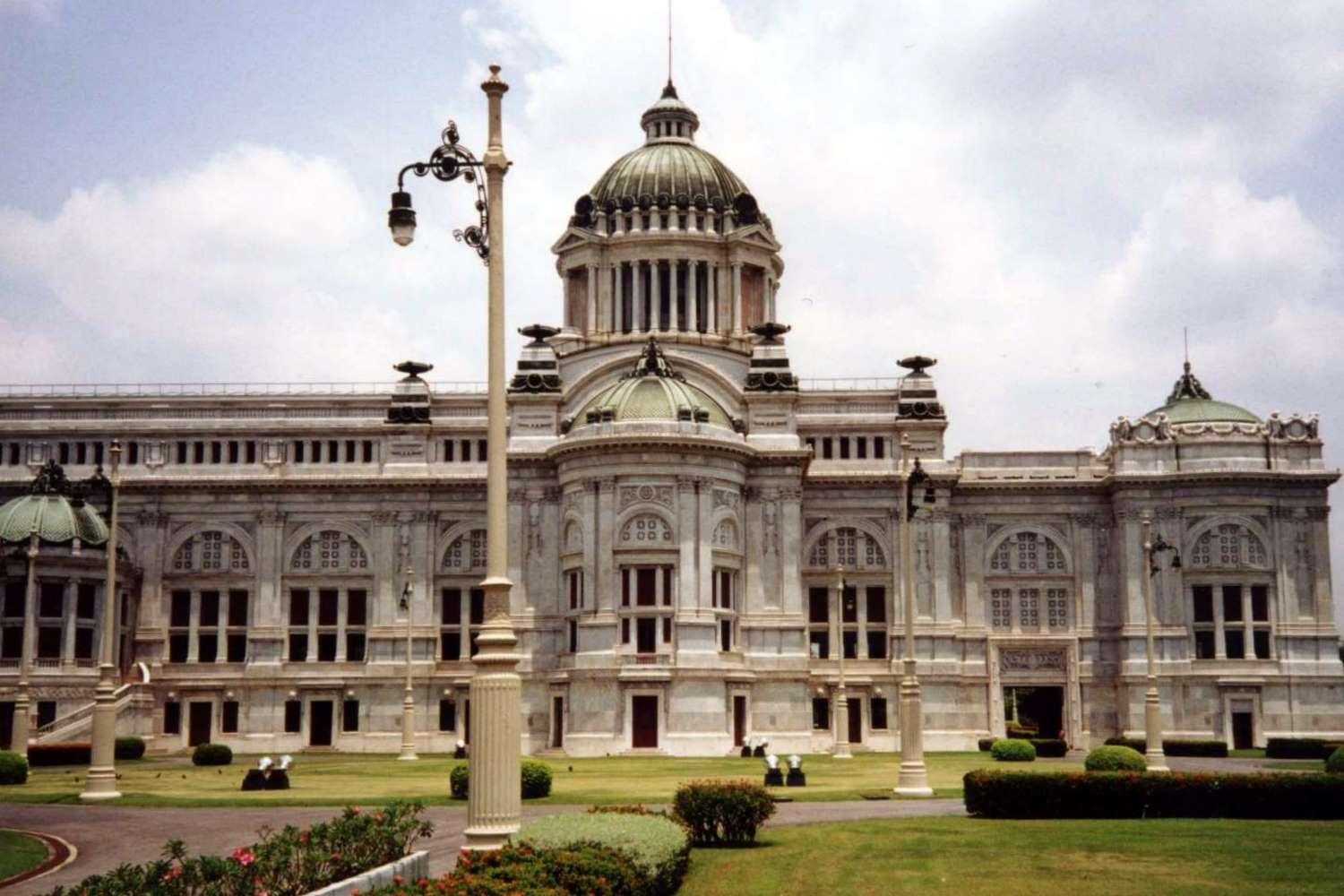
Ananda Samakhom Throne Hall the old meeting place of the National Assembly, now only the State Opening is held there.

Prior to 1932, the Kingdom of Siam did not possess a legislature, as all legislative powers were vested in the person of the monarch. This had been the case since the foundation of the Sukhothai Kingdom in the 12th century, as the king was seen as a "Dharmaraja" or "king who rules in accordance with Dharma" (the Buddhist law of righteousness). However, on 24 June 1932 a group of civilians and military officers, calling themselves the Khana Ratsadon (or People's Party) carried out a bloodless revolution, in which the 150 years of absolute rule of the House of Chakri was ended. In its stead the group advocated a constitutional monarchy with an elected legislature.

The "Draft Constitution" of 1932 signed by King Prajadhipok, created Thailand's first legislature, a People's Assembly with 70 appointed members. The Assembly met for the first time on 28 June 1932, in the Ananda Samakhom Throne Hall. The Khana Ratsadon decided that the people were not yet ready for an elected assembly, then later changed their minds. By the time the "permanent" constitution came into force in December of that year, elections were scheduled for 15 November 1933. The new constitution changed the composition of the Assembly to 78 directly elected and 78 appointed (by the Khana Ratsadon), together totalling 156 members.

=== After World War II until military dominance ===
After the Second World War a new constitution was promulgated in 1946 under the government of Pridi Panomyong. The constitution is considered Thailand's most democratic and created for the first time a bicameral legislature: a Senate and a House of Representatives. Also for the first and last time, the constitution called for a fully elected Senate (albeit indirectly) and House. The Senate to a six-year term and the House to four years. The ban on political parties was lifted and the first full elections were held in 1946. However, in 1947 a coup d'état by the military abrogated the constitution and replaced it with the 1947 "temporary" and then a "permanent" charter in 1949. The new constitution retained the House but created a 100-member Senate directly appointed by the king.

On June 5, 1949, Orapin Chaiyakan became the first woman to be elected to hold a post in the National Assembly of Thailand (specifically, the House of Representatives.)

=== Military dominance ===
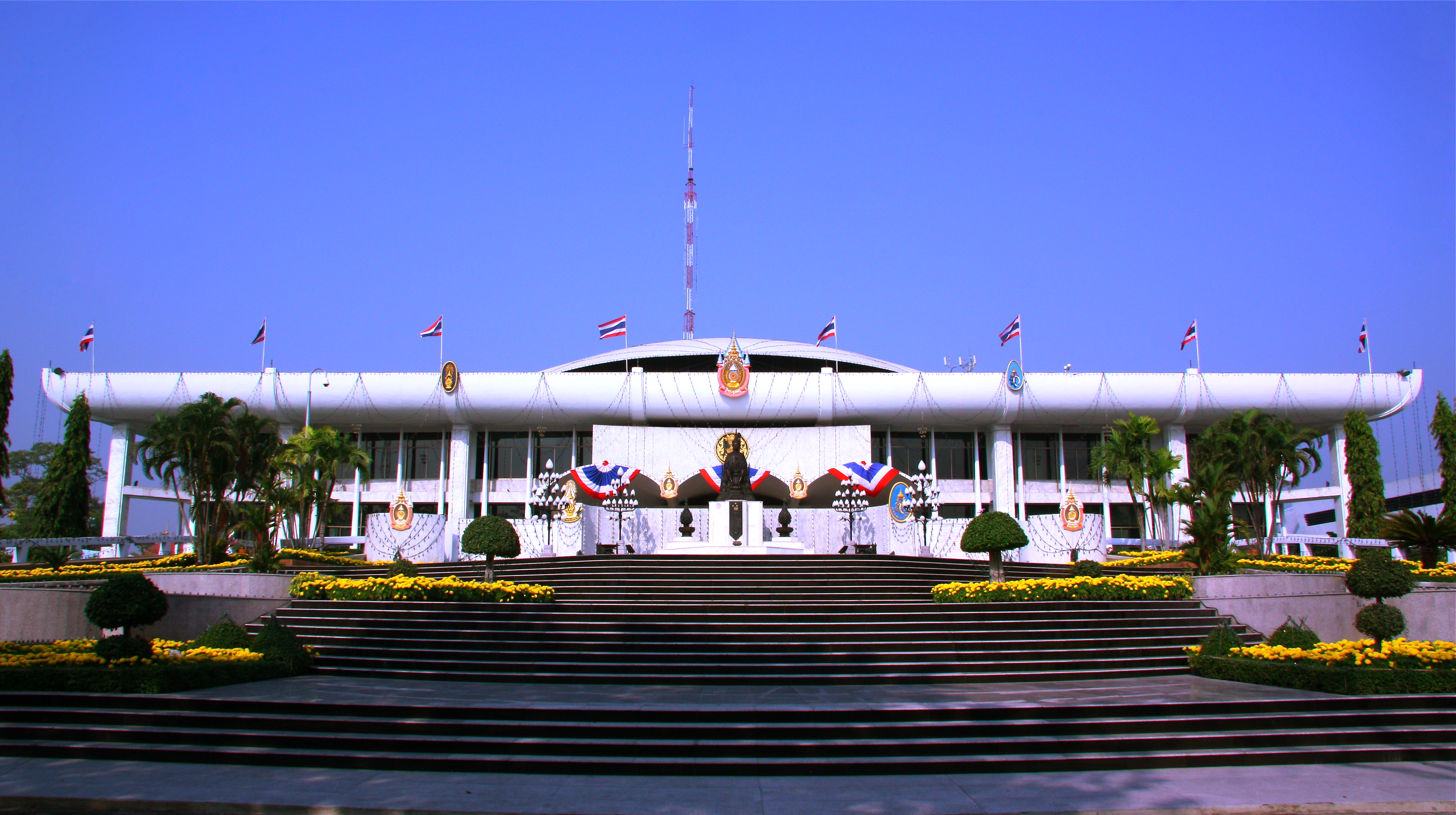
Parliament House of Thailand, meeting place for both the House and the Senate from 1974 to 2019

This charter lasted until 1957 when the military again carried out a coup d'état and created a single 123-member appointed National Assembly, 103 of which were from the military or police. In 1959 Field Marshal Sarit Thanarat carried out another coup d'état this time abolishing the National Assembly altogether. In 1969 under Thanom Kittikachorn the National Assembly returned, this time with a 219-member House and again a royally appointed Senate. This lasted until 1972 when Thanom overthrew his own government and ruled the country through a National Executive Council. Under pressure Thanom reinstated a 299-member appointed National Legislative Assembly, 200 which were members of the military.

In 1973, the rule of the "three tyrants" (as Thanom's tenure became known) was finally overthrown. A new constitution was promulgated, this time swinging the power back to the legislature by creating a bicameral legislature with an elected House and a House-appointed Senate. Within two years the military led by Thanin Kraivichien again abrogated the constitution and installed a royally-appointed 360-member unicameral National Assembly.

By 1978, Kriangsak Chamanan (who succeeded Tanin in 1977) restored the bicameral legislature with an elected 301-member House and a 225-member Senate appointed by the prime minister. This arrangement lasted for almost 13 years until Army Commander General Suchinda Kraprayoon overthrew the government of Chatichai Choonhavan in 1991 and returned the unicameral appointed National Assembly with 292 members. However, Suchinda's rule was brought down by the Black May uprising, which led to the overthrow of the military and the drafting of a new constitution.

=== The present ===
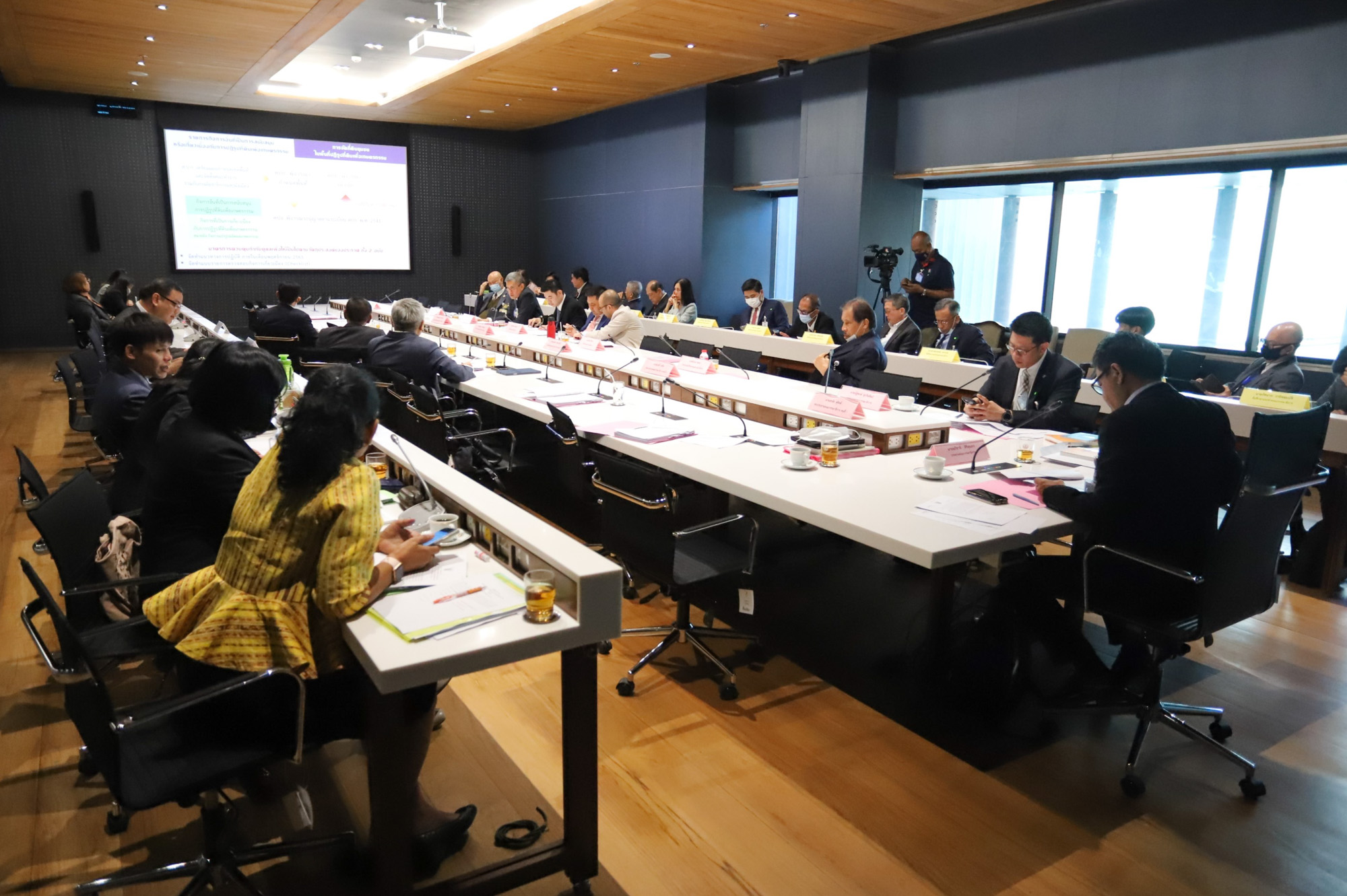
Committee meeting room at Sappaya-Sapasathan (new Parliament House of Thailand) during the standing committee meeting.

The Constitution of 1997 or the "People's Constitution", returned Thailand to democracy with a National Assembly composed of an elected 500-member (400 directly, 100 by party-lists) House of Representatives, and an elected 200-member Senate. This arrangement lasted for almost ten years. The constitution was abrogated following the 2006 Coup d'état by the military under General Sonthi Boonyaratglin. In 2007, the military appointed National Legislative Assembly to draft the new constitution. This copy was eventually adopted after it was approved through a referendum in 2007. This constitution was abrogated at the end of 2013 with the fall of the Yingluck Shinawatra government. As of 2016, the country is governed by the 2014 interim constitution of Thailand. A referendum on a new constitution is held in August 2016. After it was approved through a referendum in 2016, on 6 April 2017 new constitution is officially endorsed by His Majesty the King Vajiralongkorn in the ceremony of promulgation for the 2017 constitution.

- Further Information: Constitution of Thailand

== Current Leadership of Both Houses ==
The Senate		The House of Representative			
The President Mongkol Surasajja		The Speaker Sophon Saram		The Prime Minister Anutin Charnvirakul	The Leader of the Opposition Natthaphong Ruengpanyawut
1st Vice-President Kriangkrai Srirak	2nd Vice-President Bunsong Noisophon	1st Deputy-Speaker Mallika Jiraphanwanich	2nd Deputy-Speaker Lertsak Pattanachaikul	Deputy Prime Ministers: Phipat Ratchakitprakarn; Songsak Thongsri; Ekniti Nitithanprapas; Sihasak Phuangketkeow; Suphajee Suthumpun; Pakorn Nilprapunt; Yodchanan Wongsawat	The Leader of the Opposition Natthaphong Ruengpanyawut

== See also ==
- President of the National Assembly of Thailand
- National People's Assembly of Thailand
- National Legislative Assembly of Thailand 2006
- Government of Thailand
- Politics of Thailand
- Constitution of Thailand
- 2007 Constitution of Thailand
- Senate of Thailand
- House of Representatives of Thailand
- Elections in Thailand
- List of legislatures by country
