= 2006 Thai Senate election =

← 2000	19 April 2006	2008 →
- All 200 seats in the Senate
Party	Seats	+/–
Independents	200	0
This lists parties that won seats. See the complete results below.

Senate elections were held in Thailand on 19 April 2006. All 1,463 candidates for the 200 seats ran as independents, as they were forbidden from belonging to a political party or campaigning on its behalf. Despite the party ban, around 106 seats went to candidates deemed supporters of the Thai Rak Thai party, while 36 were won by candidates associated with the party's ally, Thai Nation Party.

Voter turnout was 62.5%. Election-related violence by separatists in the south of the country saw three people killed and 21 injured.

== Results ==
Party	Seats
Independents	200
Total	200
Source: IPU
