= Constitutional organizations of Thailand =

Executive branch agencies of the government of Thailand

The constitutional organizations of Thailand (Thai: องค์กรตามรัฐธรรมนูญ; RTGS: ongkon tam ratthathammanun) are executive branch agencies of the Government of Thailand, that exist and function outside the Cabinet Ministries of Thailand.

Most of these agencies were constitutionally mandated and were created in the 1997 constitution of Thailand, they were re-affirmed in the 2007 Constitution of Thailand. Apart from their constitutional requirements, the agencies are governed by statute laws and regulations.

== Overview ==
Constitutional organizations are executive branch agencies of the Government of Thailand that exist and function outside of cabinet ministries. Most of these agencies were constitutionally mandated and were created in the 1997 constitution of Thailand, the "people's constitution", and re-affirmed in the 2007 constitution.

Before 1997 cabinet ministries were the primary operating units of the executive branch. However, the need for independent agencies with regulatory powers were needed as a check on corrupt elected officials and civil servants. This, and the desire to include the electorate in the political process, prompted the framers of the 1997 constitution of Thailand to create the new "constitutional organs". These agencies are not considered part of the executive, although they carry executive power and members of these agencies are civil servants. They more closely resemble the judicial branch. This is due to their semi-judicial nature, such as decisions which carry and force of law and their impartial nature.

Most of the agencies use the word "commission" in their titles, and are run by a committee of appointed officials. Appointed by the King of Thailand with the advice of a selection committee (made up of legislative and judicial members) or the Senate of Thailand. Very little of the initial structure of these agencies was changed with the promulgation of the 2007 Constitution of Thailand.

== Agencies ==
- Election Commission of Thailand (Thai: คณะกรรมการการเลือกตั้ง; RTGS: khana kamma kan kan lueak tang; Abrv: EC) regulates and certifies elections at every level in the Kingdom of Thailand. It has wide-ranging powers to disqualify or call new elections when irregularities are found. The commission has powers of investigation, authority to prosecute crimes involved with elections, and authority over the regulation of political parties.
- Office of the Ombudsman Thailand or "Ombudsman of the National Assembly" (Thai: ผู้ตรวจการแผ่นดินของรัฐสภา; RTGS: phu truat kan phaen din khong rattha sapha ) is an agency responsible for the investigation of complaints made by citizens against the government. The ombudsmen themselves are appointed on the "advice" of the senate to the king.
- State Audit Commission of Thailand (Thai: คณะกรรมการการตรวจเงินแผ่นดิน; RTGS: khana kamma kan truat ngoen phaen din; Abrv: SAC) led by the auditor general, the commission examines the accounts and finances of the government to ensure transparency and to prosecute financial fraud.
- National Anti-Corruption Commission (Thai: คณะกรรมการป้องกันและปราบปรามการทุจริตแห่งชาติ; RTGS: khana kammakan kan pong kan lae prappram kan thutcharit haeng chat; Abrv: NACC) is responsible for the ethical conduct, financial or otherwise, of elected politicians and civil servants. The commission has powers of investigation and prosecution.
- National Human Rights Commission of Thailand (Thai: คณะกรรมการสิทธิมนุษยชนแห่งชาติ; RTGS: khana kamma kan sitthi manutsayachon haeng chat; Abrv: NHRCT) investigates complaints by citizens of human right abuses or the miscarriage of justice in contravention of the constitution.
- Office of the Attorney General (Thai: สำนักงานอัยการสูงสุด; RTGS: samnak ngan aiyakan sung sut; Abrv: OAG)

== See also ==
- List of Cabinet Ministries of Thailand
- Cabinet of Thailand
- Elections in Thailand
- Government of Thailand
- Politics of Thailand
- State agencies of Thailand
- 1997 constitution of Thailand
- Constitutional body
