= Parliamentary committees of Thailand =

The parliamentary committees of Thailand are committees of the National Assembly of Thailand. Each consists of a small number of Members of Parliament from the House of Representatives, or senators from the Senate of Thailand, appointed to deal with particular areas or issues.

== House of Representatives ==
=== Standing committees ===
Standing committees in the House of Representatives are designed to oversee the work of departments and agencies, are permanent committees established under the standing rules of each house and specialize in exclusive subject areas.

- Administration
- Agriculture and Cooperatives
- The Armed Forces
- Budgeting Study and Budget Administration Follow up
- Children, Youth, Women, Older Persons, Persons with Disabilities, Ethnic Groups, and LGBTs
- Commerce and Intellectual Property
- Communications, Telecommunications, and Digital Economy and Society
- Consumer Protection
- Corruption Prevention and Suppression
- Decentralization, Local Administration and Special Form of Administration
- Economic Development
- Education
- Energy
- Foreign Affairs
- The House of Representatives Affairs
- Industry
- Judiciary, Independent Organs, State Attorney Organ, State Enterprises, Public Organizations, and Funds
- Labor
- Land, Natural Resources and Environment
- Legal Affairs, Justice, and Human Rights
- Monetary Affairs, Finance, Financial Institutions, and Financial Market
- Money Laundering and Narcotics Prevention and Suppression
- National Debt Solution
- National Security, Border Affairs, National Strategy, and National Reform
- Natural and Public Disasters Prevention and Mitigation
- Police Affairs
- Political Development, Mass Communications, and Public Participation
- Public Health
- Religions, Arts, and Culture
- Science, Technology, Research, and Innovation
- Social Welfare
- Sports
- Tourism
- Transport

== Senate of Thailand ==
The Senate of Thailand select committees to examine and explore general issues.

=== Standing committees ===
- Administration of State Affairs
- Agriculture and Cooperatives
- Armed Forces and State Security
- Budget and Fiscal Review
- Commerce and Industry
- Economics, Monetary Affairs, and Finance
- Education
- Energy
- Foreign Affairs
- Higher Education, Science, Research, and Innovation
- Human Rights and Consumer Protection
- Independent Agency Affairs
- Information Technology and Communication, and Telecommunication
- Labour
- Laws, Justice, and Police Affairs
- Local Administration
- Monitoring, Recommending and Accelerating National Reform and the Preparation and Implementation of the National Strategy
- Natural Resources and Environment
- Political Development and Public Participation
- Poverty and Inequality Reduction
- Public Health
- Religion, Morality, Ethics, Arts, and Culture
- Social Development, Children, Youth, Women, Elderly, Persons with Disabilities, and Vulnerable Populations
- Sports
- Studying and Inspecting Corruption, Misconduct, and Promoting Good Governance
- Tourism
- Transportation

=== Ad hoc committees ===
Ad hoc committees in the House of Representatives are formed on an ad hoc basis that deems required to process bills or examine new law by the parliamentarians. Ad hoc committees are disestablished after the tasks are finished.

- Ad Hoc Senate Committee on Rules and Administration
- Ad Hoc Committee on Protecting and Upholding the Monarchy

== List of Standing committees ==
Committee	Chair	Deputy Chair
House of Representatives Standing Committees
Administration	Prasert Bunruang	Panu Pornwattana
Agriculture and Cooperatives	Sakdinai Numnu	Sutham Jaritngam
Armed Forces	Wirot Lakkanaadisorn	Tanadej Pengsuk
Budgeting Study and Budget Administration Follow up	Surachet Pravinvongvuth	Pattana Sapso
Children, Youth, Women, Older Persons, Persons with Disabilities, Ethnic Groups, and LGBTs	Panuwat Sasomsub	Kittunya Wajadee
Commerce and Intellectual Property	Pramual Pongthavaradet	Worawat Auapinyakul
Communications, Telecommunications, and Digital Economy and Society	Siam Hathasongkorh	Surakiat Thientong
Consumer Protection	Boonying Nitikanchana	Boonchai Kittitharasup
