= Election Commission of Thailand =

Independent government agency in Thailand

Election Commission
- คณะกรรมการการเลือกตั้ง (กกต.)
- Official emblem of the Office of the Election Commission of Thailand

- Logo of the Election Commission of Thailand

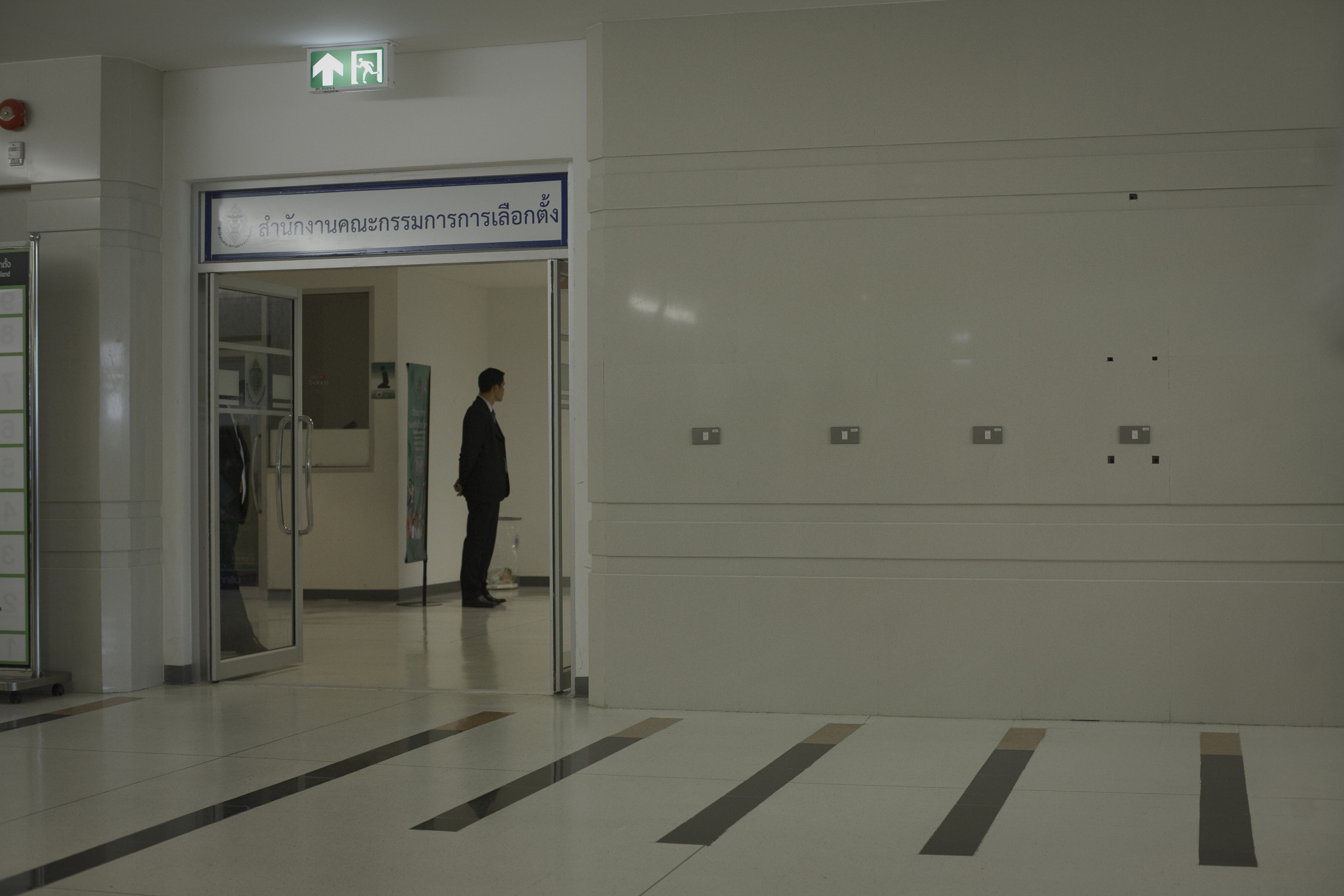
- Front door of the Election Commission (2011)

Agency overview
- Formed: 9 June 1998
- Type: Constitutional organization
- Jurisdiction: Kingdom of Thailand
- Headquarters: No. 120, Ratthaprasatphakdi Building, Chaeng Watthana Government Complex, Chaeng Watthana Rd., Thung Song Hong Subdistrict, Lak Si, Bangkok, 10210
- Annual budget: 8,247 million baht (FY2019)
- Agency executives: Ittiporn Boonprakong, Chairman; Jarungvith Phumma, Secretary-General
- Website: Official website

The Election Commission (Thai: คณะกรรมการการเลือกตั้ง, RTGS: Khana Kammakan Kan Lueaktang) is an independent government agency and the sole election management body of Thailand. It oversees government elections (parliamentary elections and local elections) as well as referendums throughout the Kingdom of Thailand. Established by the 1997 constitution, the Election Commission (EC) has extensive powers to manage, oversee, and regulate the electoral process. The EC has reacted to irregularities in the 2000 Senate elections, the 2006 House elections, and the 2007 House elections, forcing re-elections and disqualifying many candidates. Election Commission is heavily criticized for untrustworthy and unprofessional practice during 2023 election, some critics are expected that the commission itself is under the influence of the military and orchestrated election fraud itself.

== Roles and responsibilities ==
The primary role of the commission is to ensure that elections carried out in the Kingdom of Thailand are lawful and compatible with the constitution. It is also in charge of enforcing national election laws covering: House of Representatives, Senate, Districts, Referendums, Bangkok gubernatorial elections and political parties. Its constitutional duty includes the publication of all election returns, therefore formalizing them. The commissioners also have the right to disqualify a candidate, or call for a re-count for a particular seat.

The EC's responsibilities include the organization, management, and counting of all elections and voting in the kingdom. It advises the National Assembly on future policies concerning elections and suffrage. The commission has legal powers as a law enforcement agency to investigate and indict those who compromise election laws through bribery, corruption, vote buying, or blackmail. The commission has the power to investigate the finances and donor lists of all political parties. It informs the public of elections and their importance.

== Budget ==
In FY2019, the EC is allocated 8,247 million baht, more than tripling from the FY2018 budget of 2,265 million baht due to national elections in 2019.

== Structure ==
The Election Commission of Thailand is composed of a committee of five members, one chairman (Thai: ประธานกรรมการการเลือกตั้ง) and four election commissioners (Thai: กรรมการการเลือกตั้ง). The administrative side of the commission is run by the secretary-general (Thai: เลขาธิการคณะกรรมการการเลือกตั้ง). As well as being regular members of the commission, the five members are also given various responsibilities. All commissioners are appointed by the king, with the advice of the Senate of Thailand; for a term of seven years. The current commission is the fourth team of election commissioners, appointed 12 August 2018.

Election Commission
Office	Name	Role	Since
Chairman of the Election Commission	Ittiporn Boonprakong	General Administration	12 August 2018
Election Commissioner	Santhat Siriananpaiboon	Election Administration	12 August 2018
Election Commissioner	Thawatchai Pakorn	Investigation and Adjudication	12 August 2018
Election Commissioner	Chatchai Chanpraisri	Political Party Affairs and Referendum	12 August 2018
Election Commissioner	Pakorn Mahannop	Public Participation	12 August 2018
Secretary-General	Jarungvith Phumma	Election Commission's Secretariat	12 August 2018

== History ==
Prior to 1992, the responsibility of overseeing elections fell on the Ministry of Interior or Mahatthai Ministry. Under the premiership of Anand Panyarachun after the Thai general election of 1992, the prime minister realised the need to create a central and independent body, whose sole purpose was to regulate and manage elections. As a result, on 22 March 1992 the "Committee to Administer and Investigate Elections to the House of Representatives" (Thai: "คณะกรรมการติดตามและสอดส่องดูแลการเลือกตั้งสมาชิกสภาผู้แทนราษฎร") was created, a precursor of the commission. The commission in its current form was created by the 1997 constitution of Thailand.

=== 2006 House election ===
The Thai general election of 2006, was held on 9 April for the House of Representatives and 19 April for the Senate. The main opposition parties, composed of the Democrat Party, the Chart Thai Party, and the Mahachon Party, boycotted the election on the grounds that Thaksin Shinawatra's government had unfairly called an election to divert public attention form the Shin Corp scandal. Despite this, the election went ahead.

On 3 April 2006, the People's Alliance for Democracy (PAD) petitioned the Administrative Court to suspend the results of the election and accused the Election Commission of violating voter privacy. It accused the commission of placing voting booths so that voters' backs were to the public, when in all previous elections, voters faced the public, with a barrier one-half meter tall at the front of the booth separating the voter from the public. The commission claimed the new arrangement was designed to prevent various forms of polling fraud including the use of cameras by voters to take photographs of their ballots. After the 2005 election, cameras and camera phones were banned from voting stations due to fears that canvassers would demand ballot photographs in return for money. However, the PAD claimed that this allowed onlookers to peek over voters' shoulders and see who they voted for.

The elections were eventually declared invalid by Thailand's Constitutional Court, which found the positioning of voting booths violated voter privacy. The Constitutional Court forced the Election Commission to resign over its management of the April elections. The court failed to persuade the EC president to resign. It did, however, prevent the Senate from appointing a replacement for commissioner Jaral Buranapansri, who had died. This prevented the commission from achieving a quorum. It later found the remaining commissioners guilty of malfeasance and jailed them for one night. An entirely new commission was appointed.

=== 2007 House election ===
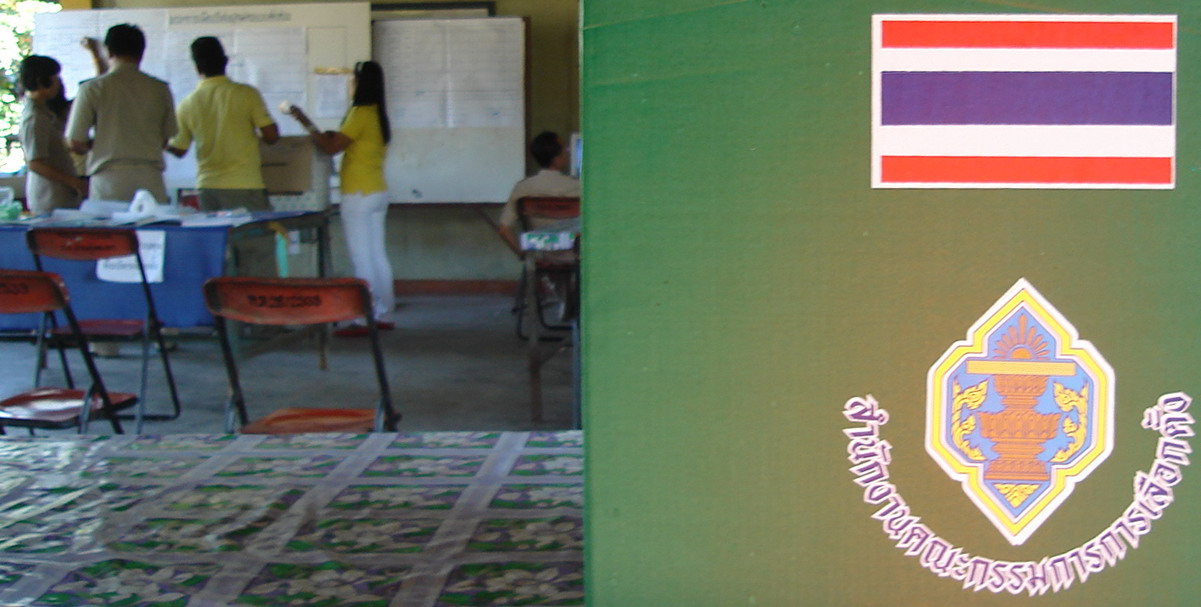
Polling Station during the 2007 election

A number of MPs (mainly those elected for the PPP) were given "red cards" for alleged vote buying, meaning they would not be able to contest the resulting by-elections. Other MPs were issued "yellow cards" and not banned from contesting the by-elections. By 3 January 2008, the Election Commission had endorsed 397 MPs and was still investigating 83 MPs for fraud.

By-elections were held on 13 January, 17 January, 20 January (the day before the first session of the newly elected parliament) and 27 January 2008. The Electoral Commission was still looking into allegations of fraud by PPP deputy leader Yongyuth Tiyaphairat. If given a red card, the PPP faced dissolution. PPP officials stated that they are not worried about dissolution, and that they would simply find a new party instead; local reports stated that a likely candidate for takeover by PPP members would be the Thai Land Power Party (Palang Pandin Thai Party).

Disqualified were:

- PPP
  - red cards for Prakit Poldej, Pornchai Srisuthiyothin, Rungroj Thongsri – Buri Ram Province constituency 1
  - yellow cards for Boonlert Krudkhunthod, Linda Cherdchai, Prasert Chanruangthong – Nakhon Ratchasima Province Constituency 3
  - yellow card for Thanatorn Losunthorn – Lampang Province Constituency 1
  - yellow cards for Surathin Phimarnmekhin, Anan Sriphan, Cherdchai Wichianwan – Udon Thani Province
  - yellow cards for Prasop Busarakham and one other MP, with Busarakham's card changed to red later – Udon Thani Province Constituency 3
- Thai Nation Party
  - red cards for two MPs – Chai Nat Province
- Democrat Party
  - yellow card for Suthat Jansaengsi – Phetchabun Province 86
- For the Motherland Party
  - yellow cards for two MPs

=== 2008 Senate election ===
No major event occurred.

=== 2011 General election ===
On 19 July, both Yingluck Shinawatra and Abhisit Vejjajiva were acknowledged as members of the House. On 27 July, the acknowledgement extended to further ninety four elected candidates. Now and eventually, the number acknowledged sufficed to constitute the House. This, however, did not include Jatuporn Prompan whom the Election Commission declared to have lost the suffrage due to failure to vote in both the previous and the present elections. The Constitution requires that a member of the House must possess the suffrage, and also prescribes that a person failing to vote in an election loses the suffrage but regains it once voting in the next election.

== See also ==
- Elections in Thailand
- Constitution of Thailand
- House of Representatives of Thailand
- List of ministries of Thailand
