= Singsuk Singpai =

Thai politician

- สิงห์ศึก สิงห์ไพร

First Vice-President of the Senate of Thailand
- In office 28 May 2019 – 10 July 2024
- Monarch: Vajiralongkorn
- Prime Minister: Prayut Chan-o-cha; Srettha Thavisin
- Preceded by: Surachai Liengboonlertchai
- Succeeded by: Kriangkrai Srirak

Personal details
- Born: February 26, 1952 (age 74) Chiang Rai, Thailand
- Education: Armed Forces Academies Preparatory School; Chulachomklao Royal Military Academy (BSc); Ramkhamhaeng University (MBA)

Military service
- Allegiance: Thailand
- Branch/service: Royal Thai Army
- Years of service: 1976–2012
- Rank: General

Singsuk Singpai (Thai: สิงห์ศึก สิงห์ไพร) was the First Vice-President of the Senate of Thailand and Member of the Thai Senate from 2019 to 2024, and former special advisor to the Royal Thai Army.

== Early life ==
Singsuk Singpai was born on 26 February 1952. He studied a Bachelor of Science at Chulachomklao Royal Military Academy and a Master of Business Administration at Ramkhamhaeng University.
