= 2014 Thai Senate election =

- 30 March 2014
- 77 of the 150 seats in the Senate
- Turnout: 42.79%
Party	Vote %	Seats	+/–
Independents	87.38	77	+1
This lists parties that won seats. See the complete results below.

Senate elections were held in Thailand on 29 March 2014 for the second time under the 2007 constitution. Half the senate seats were elected for non-partisan candidates under the first-past-the-post voting system, with voters electing one senator per province. Voter turnout was 43%, down from 56% in the 2008 senate elections and 46% in the February 2014 general elections, which had been boycotted by the opposition,

== Background ==
The elections took place against the background of a political crisis in Thailand between the Shinawatra family – who had won all recent elections and were popular among the poor in the rural north – and the royalist and middle class establishment in Bangkok, who accused the Shinawatras of corruption. The February 2014 general elections were boycotted by the opposition Democrat Party amid street protests against the government of Prime Minister Yingluck Shinawatra. A week before the senate elections the Constitutional Court annulled the general election results.

The Prime Minister and most of the ruling MPs are facing investigation by the National Anti Corruption Commission, who can refer politicians to the senate for impeachment. The Senate can pass an impeachment with a 60% majority, which results in a ban from political office for five years.

== Electoral system ==
The 2007 constitution provided for a 150-seat Senate, of which just under half are nominated by a Senators Selection Committee, made up of establishment figures. According to political scientist Duncan McCargo, "most nominated senators are broadly in the pro-Democrat camp" which is opposed to the acting government of Prime Minister Yingluck Shinawatra. A local think tank, the Siam Intelligence Unit, estimates that 90% of the nominated senators are anti-government.

Elected senators must be independent from political parties, with no immediate relatives in parliament and must not have been a member of a political party in the last five years. However, most winning candidates have been endorsed by powerful local party-linked institutions.

== Results ==
There were 443 candidates for the 77 elected seats – an average of 5.5 per seat. There were 48.7 million voters registered for the election and turnout was 43%. This included 17% of voters who went to vote and cast blank or invalid votes.

In the capital Bangkok, the seat was won by Auditor-General Jaruwan Maintaka, who is best known for her membership of the "Asset Scrutiny Committee" set up by the military government following the 2006 Thailand coup. The election of Jaruwan who is a known critic of former Prime Minister Thaksin Shinawatra was seen as an attempt of the Bangkok electorate to reduce the influence of the pro-Thaksin camp on Thai politics. Despite the requirement to be non-partisan, several new senators are informally linked to different political camps. Udon Thani Province in the Northeast, was won by the wife of Kwanchai Praipana, a local leader of the pro-government United Front for Democracy Against Dictatorship, or "red shirts". Chiang Mai Province was won by former deputy governor Adisorn Kamnerdsiri, who is considered close to the Pheu Thai Party of acting Prime Minister Yingluck Shinawatra. Samut Prakan Province elected Waraporn Asavahame, the niece of former deputy interior minister Vatana Asavahame who was convicted of corruption. Suphan Buri Province's new senator, Jongchai Thiangtham, is a former deputy secretary-general of the Chartthaipattana Party.

Party	Votes	%	Seats
Independents	17,291,103	87.38	77
Blank votes	2,496,399	12.62	–
Nominated members			73
Total	19,787,502	100.00	150
Valid votes	19,787,502	94.80	
Invalid votes	1,086,186	5.20	
Total votes	20,873,688	100.00	
Registered voters/turnout	48,786,842	42.79	
Source: Election Commission
