= State Audit Office (Thailand) =

Thai government agency

State Audit Office of the Kingdom of Thailand
- สำนักงานการตรวจเงินแผ่นดิน

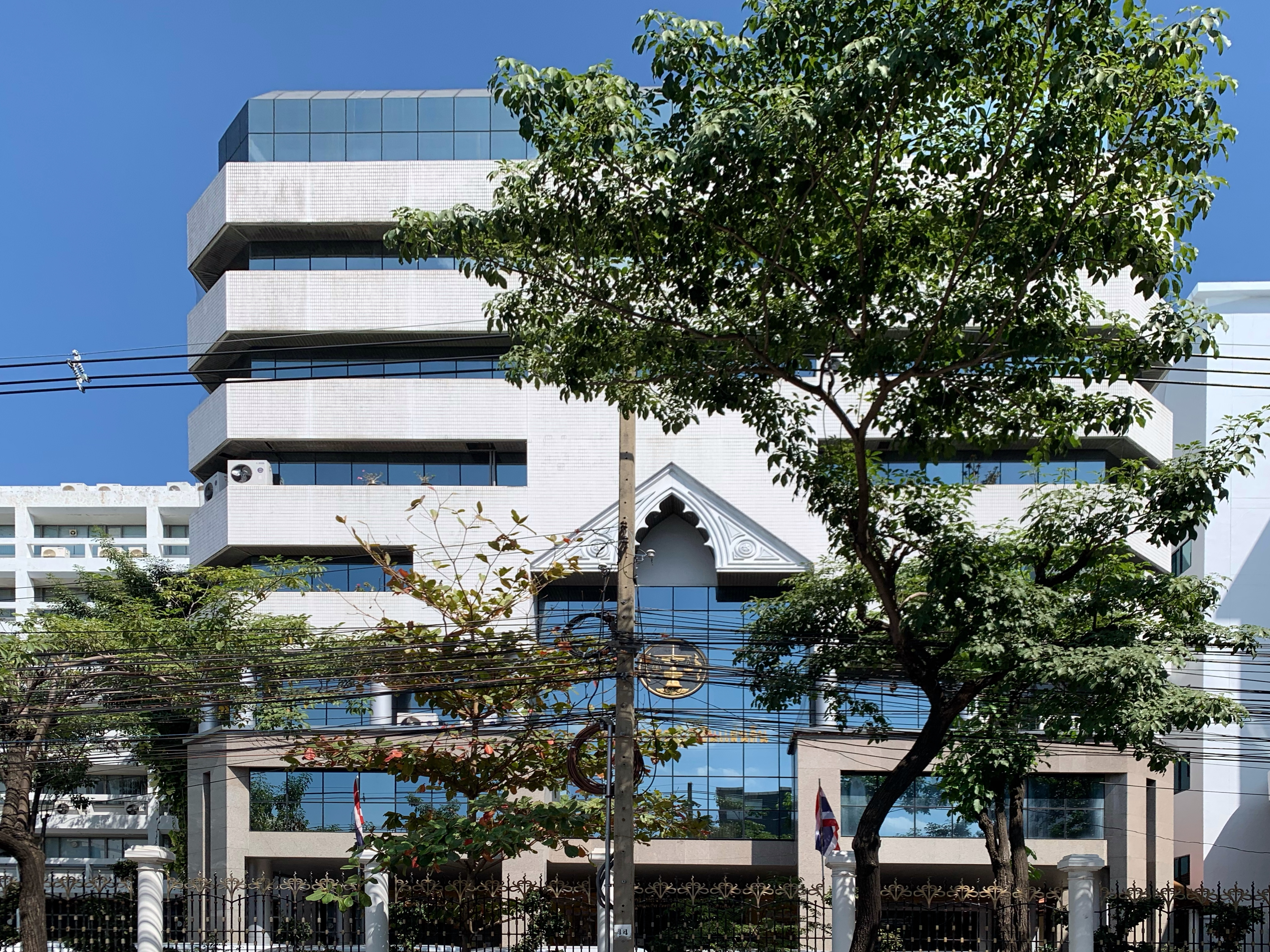

Agency overview
- Jurisdiction: Thailand
- Annual budget: 2,563,200,000 THB
- Website: www.audit.go.th

The State Audit Office (Thai: สำนักงานการตรวจเงินแผ่นดิน), previously known as the Office of the Auditor General, is an independent, constitutionally mandated state agency of Thailand. It is tasked with examining the accounts and finances of the government to ensure transparency and to prosecute financial fraud.

== Organization ==
In fiscal year 2023, the State Audit Office was appropriated 2,563.2 million baht.

== History ==
The 1997 constitution of Thailand put forth a constitutional law for the auditing of governmental assets. The Board of Audit was created with the enactment of the Organic Act on State Audit in 1999. The 2007 constitution of Thailand prompted the expansion of auditing in the government, though, no action would be taken till it went into effect.

In 2015, the Auditor-General Jaruvan Maintaka was found guilty of malfeasance and was ultimately fined 15,000 baht.

The 2017 constitution of Thailand urged a stringent approach to finances within the government. In 2018, the State Fiscal and Financial Discipline Act set up a framework for the discipline and management of finances.

In 2019, the State Audit Office began investigating Thai Airways International as a result of 6.8 billion baht loss in half a year for the airline.

In 2020, the office began construction of a new office building in Bangkok. Italian-Thai Development and the China Railway Engineering Corporation were in charge of its construction. In April 2024, the State Audit Office created a new section in regards to governmental megaprojects.

=== Office collapse ===
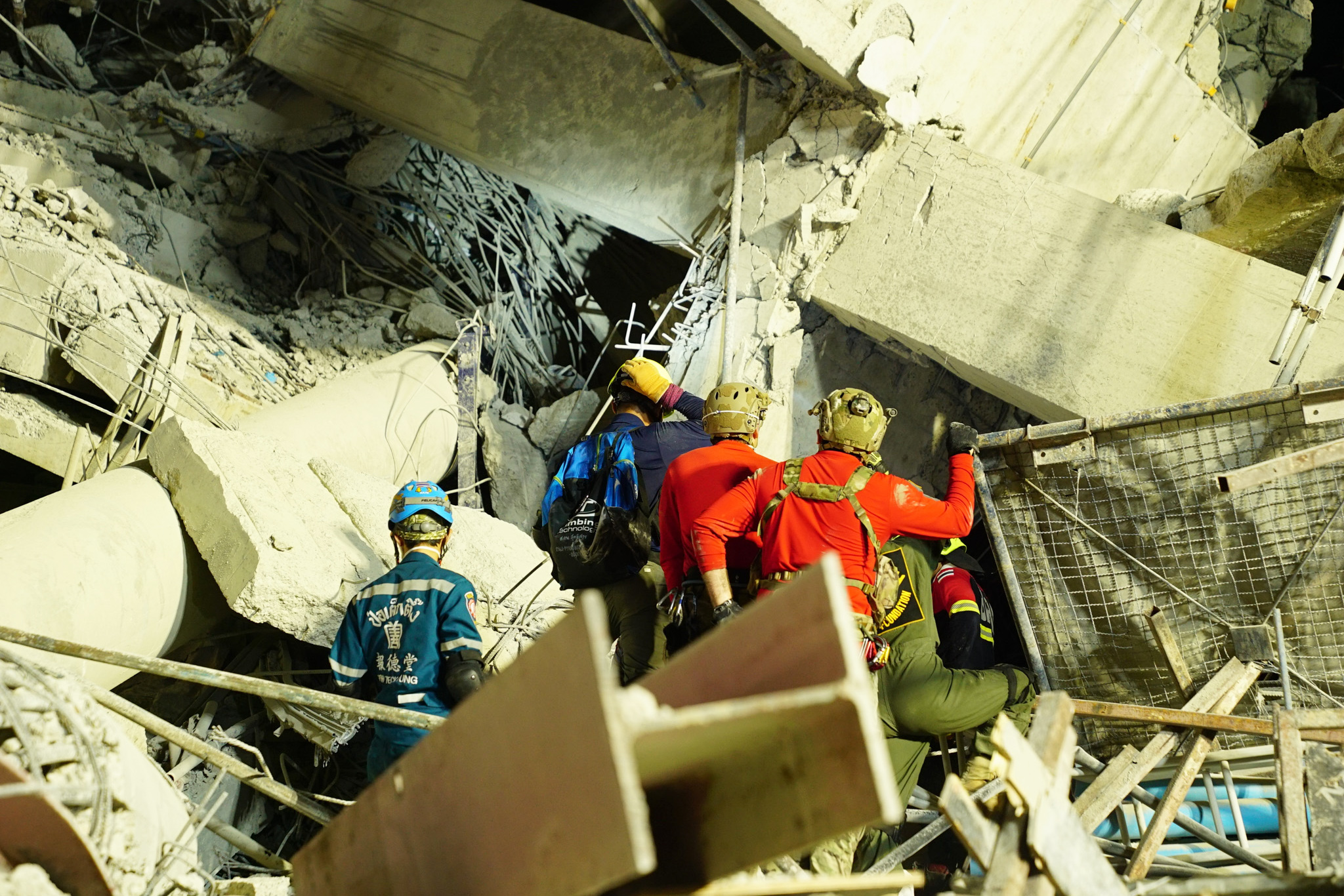
Military and first responders work near the collapsed State Audit Office building in Bangkok after 7.7 earthquake. (March 28, 2025)

On 28 March 2025, the aforementioned office building that was under construction for the State Audit Office in Bangkok collapsed as a result of an intense earthquake in Myanmar.
