= Bunsong Noisophon =

Thai politician

- บุญส่ง น้อยโสภณ

Second Vice-President of the Senate
- Incumbent
- Assumed office 26 July 2024
- Monarch: Vajiralongkorn
- Prime Minister: Srettha Thavisin; Phumtham Wechayachai (acting); Paetongtarn Shinawatra; Suriya Juangroongruangkit (acting); Anutin Charnvirakul
- Preceded by: Suphachai Somcharoen

Member of the Senate
- Incumbent
- Assumed office 10 July 2024

Personal details
- Born: 7 August 1948 (age 77)

Bunsong Noisophon (Thai: บุญส่ง น้อยโสภณ) is a Thai politician and Second Vice-president of the Senate of Thailand.

== Career ==
He serves as a Member of the Senate of Thailand from Rayong province. Prior to his Senate term, he was a member of the Election Commission of Thailand and a former judge of the Supreme Court of Thailand. He was elected Second Vice-president of the Senate of Thailand at the first session of the Senate on July 23, 2024, following the 2024 Thai Senate election.

== Royal decorations ==
- 1999 – Knight Grand Cordon of the Most Exalted Order of the White Elephant
- 1994 – Knight Grand Cordon of the Most Noble Order of the Crown of Thailand
- 1992 – Chakra Mala Medal
- 2012 – Boy Scout Citation Medal of Vajira, First Class
