= National Legislative Assembly of Thailand (2006) =

Political entity in Thailand

The National Legislative Assembly of Thailand (Thai: สภานิติบัญญัติแห่งชาติ, RTGS: Sapha Nitibanyat Haeng Chat) was an appointed body, acting as the National Assembly of Thailand after the 2006 Coup d'état. It was established by the military junta under General Sonthi Boonyaratglin which took the name of "Council for Democratic Reform under the Constitutional Monarchy" (CDR) and ceased to function at the end of 2007 when it was replaced by the new, elected National Assembly. The Constitution Drafting Assembly was also formed by the junta to prepare a new constitution.

== Composition ==
The NLA had 242 members appointed by the king, representing different sectors of the society and occupational groups. 21 of the NLA members were women.

- State sector
  - 17 civil servants of the highest ranks (paygrades C-11 and up)
  - 12 other civil servants, judges and state's attorneys
  - 41 military officers
  - 7 police officers
  - 8 managers and personnel of state-owned enterprises
- Private sector
  - 6 managers of banks and financial institutions
  - 19 representatives of commerce, industry, services, transport, building and real estate business
  - 11 representatives of other businesses
  - 7 legal advisers and attorneys
- Social sector
  - 4 representatives of political parties
  - 11 scholars of philosophy, languages, religion, arts and culture
  - 20 journalists, writers and artists
  - 43 retired public servants and other experienced persons
  - 13 activists in local development, promotion of morality, labour organisations, and non-profit organisations
- Academic sector
  - 29 rectors, professors, students, researchers, and other academics
