= 2008 Thai Senate election =

- 2 March 2008
- 76 of the 150 seats in the Senate
Party	Vote %	Seats	+/–
Independents	91.36	76	−124
This lists parties that won seats. See the complete results below.

Senate elections were held in Thailand on 2 March 2008, the first under a new constitution. Voter turnout was 56%. Results were expected on 9 March 2008.

76 candidates were elected, one for each province, while 74 senators will be nominated by a selection panel headed by the Constitution Tribunal's president Virat Limvichai. Nominations for these seats were made by professional groups between 13 January and 18 January 2008, whereafter a panel appointed by the Electoral Commission vetted the nominees' credentials before forwarding the nominations to the selection panel. The Thai Election Commission endorsed the 74 senators selected from the nominations. The senators will serve six-year terms.

The nominated senators are considered to be closer to the outgoing military administration, while among the elected senators a substantial number are closely connected to deposed former PM Thaksin. A prominent critic of Thaksin and anti-corruption activist also appeared to have been elected.

== Results ==
Party	Votes	%	Seats
Independents	21,986,942	91.36	76
Blank votes	2,079,826	8.64	–
Nominated members			74
Total	24,066,768	100.00	150
Valid votes	24,066,768	96.34	
Invalid votes	914,479	3.66	
Total votes	24,981,247	100.00	
Registered voters/turnout	44,911,254	55.62	
Source: Election Commission

== Aftermath ==
On 13 March 2008, the Senate President was elected. The former Appeals Court president Prasopsuk Boondej, a nominated senator, received 78 votes. Thaweesak Khidbanchong, considered to be close to former minister Newin Chidchob, received 45 votes; General Lertrat Ratanawanit, reportedly closely connected to the defunct coup-making Council for National Security received 15 votes, and Police Lieutenant-General Manoj Kraiwong, who had been criticised for having leaned onto the opposition Democrat Party, received six votes.
