= Nantana Nantavaropas =

Thai politician

- นันทนา นันทวโรภาส
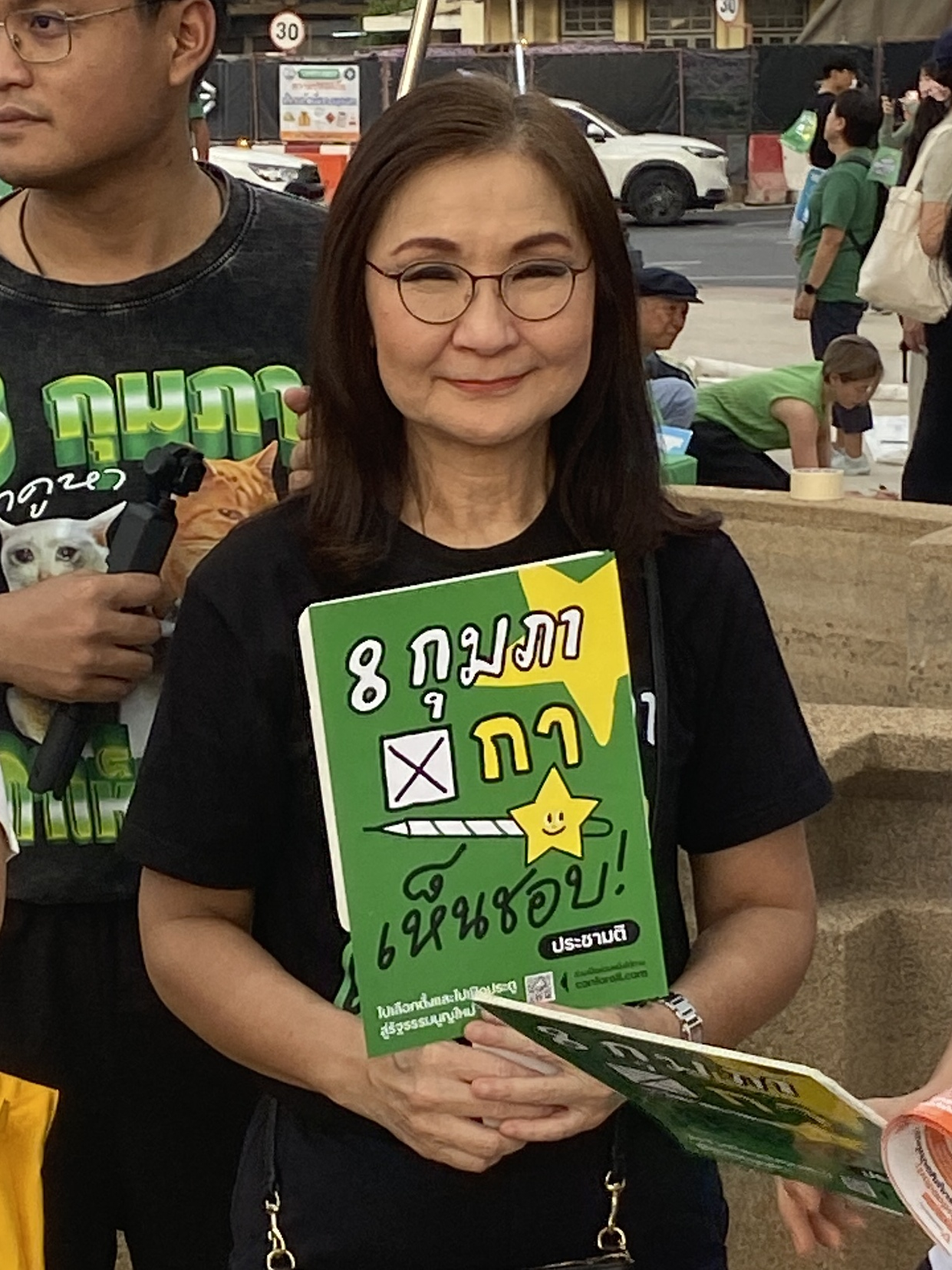

Member of the Senate of Thailand
- Incumbent
- Assumed office 10 July 2024

Nantana Nantavaropas (Thai: นันทนา นันทวโรภาส) (Note: RTGS: Nanthana Nanthawarophat; other spellings include Nanthana Nanthawarophas) is a Thai academic and politician, serving as a Member of the Senate of Thailand since 2024. She previously served as dean of the Political Communication College at Krirk University.

== Career ==
Nanthana was elected in the 2024 Thai Senate election as a representative of the media professional group. As a senator-elect, she called for an investigation into the election into allegations of vote-rigging, leading a group of 100 unsuccessful candidates. She is described as a New Generation senator, not a part of the Bhumjaithai-aligned faction.

On 2 September 2024, she made a motion in the Senate to launch a probe into comments made by Udom Sittiwirattham, Justice of the Constitutional Court of Thailand, about the dissolution of the Move Forward Party.

Following her election, Nantana accused fellow members of the Senate of colluding with the Bhumjaithai Party. She opposed the proposed renovation to the Parliament building.
