= Kriangkrai Srirak =

Thai politician

General Kriangkrai Srirak MPCh MVM
- เกรียงไกร ศรีรักษ์
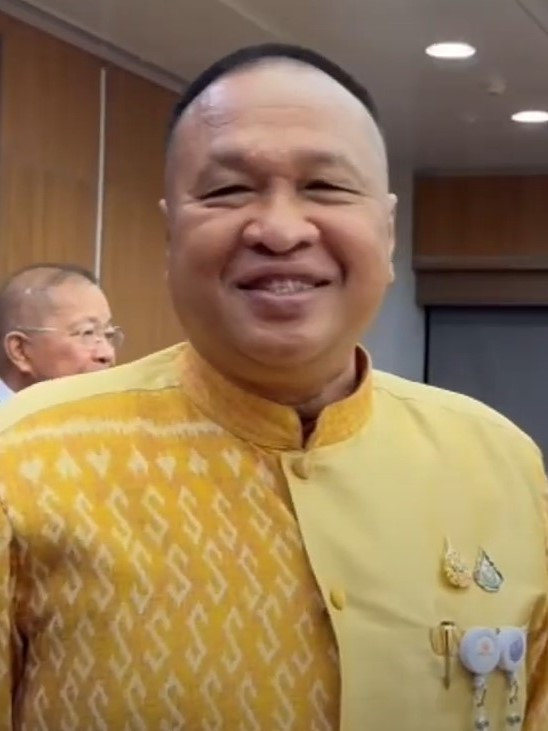

First Vice-President of the Senate
- Incumbent
- Assumed office 26 July 2024
- Monarch: Vajiralongkorn
- Prime Minister: Srettha Thavisin; Phumtham Wechayachai (acting); Paetongtarn Shinawatra; Suriya Juangroongruangkit (acting); Anutin Charnvirakul
- Preceded by: Singsuk Singpai

Member of the Senate
- Incumbent
- Assumed office 10 July 2024

Commander of the 4th Army Area
- In office 1 October 2020 – 30 September 2022

Personal details
- Born: 25 March 1963 (age 63) Surat Thani, Thailand
- Spouse: Kanungnit Srirak

Military service
- Allegiance: Thailand
- Branch/service: Royal Thai Army
- Rank: General

Kriangkrai Srirak (Thai: เกรียงไกร ศรีรักษ์) is a Thai military officer and politician, and First Vice-president of the Senate of Thailand.

== Career ==
He serves as a Member of the Senate of Thailand from Surat Thani province. Prior to his Senate term, he was 4th Army Region Commander serving in the three southern border provinces (Yala, Narathiwat, and Pattani) against the South Thailand insurgency. He was elected First Vice-president of the Senate of Thailand at the first session of the Senate on July 23, 2024, following the 2024 Thai Senate election.

== Royal decorations ==
- 2025 – Knight Grand Cross of the Most Exalted Order of the White Elephant
- 2023 – Knight Grand Cordon of the Most Noble Order of the Crown of Thailand
- 1989 – Freemen Safeguarding Medal (Second Class, Second Category)
- 2010 – Border Service Medal
- 2008 – Chakra Mala Medal
