= 2007 Thai constitutional referendum =

- 19 August 2007
- Do you approve or disapprove of the draft constitution?

Results
Choice	Votes	%
Yes	14,727,306	57.81%
No	10,747,441	42.19%
Valid votes	25,474,747	98.06%
Invalid or blank votes	504,207	1.94%
Total votes	25,978,954	100.00%
Registered voters/turnout	45,092,955	57.61%
Results by province
Yes
50%-60%
60%-70%
70%-80%
80%-90%
>90%
No
50%-60%
60%-70%
70%-80%

A referendum on the new constitution was held in Thailand on 19 August 2007. Had the draft been rejected, the military government would have had the freedom to choose any previous constitution to adapt and promulgate instead. The turnout was around 60%.

== Proposed changes ==
Major changes in the proposed constitution included the following:

- Making almost half of Senators appointed rather than elected.
- Limiting the Prime Minister to 2 four-year terms.
- Banning the Prime Minister from major holdings in private companies.
- Making it easier to impeach the Prime Minister and other ministers.

The military government announced that each household in the country would be sent a copy of the new constitution ahead of the referendum. A poll from July had seen a majority of voters in favour. However, in many cases "yes" votes were not real indicators of support for the new text but rather for quick elections, as the ruling Council for National Security (CNS) has stated that approval of the new constitution was a requirement for holding parliamentary elections later that year.

== Results ==
Choice	Votes	%
For	14,727,306	57.81
Against	10,747,441	42.19
Invalid/blank votes	504,207	–
Total	25,978,954	100
Registered voters/turnout	45,092,955	57.61
Source: Direct Democracy

=== By region ===
Region	For		Against		Turnout (%)
Region	Votes	%	Votes	%	Turnout (%)
Central Thailand	5,714,973	66.53	2,874,674	33.47	57.72
Southern Thailand	3,214,506	88.30	425,883	11.70	59.31
Northeast Thailand	3,050,182	37.20	5,149,957	62.80	54.39
Northern Thailand	2,747,645	54.47	2,296,927	45.53	62.06
Total	14,727,306	57.81	10,747,441	42.19	57.61

=== By province ===
There were considerable differences in the approval rates between the regions of Thailand. In six provinces of Southern Thailand (Chumphon, Trang, Nakhon Si Thammarat, Songkhla, Surat Thani, Ranong), the approval topped 90%. On the other hand, in 24 provinces in Northern and Northeastern Thailand there was a majority against the draft. In two provinces in the far Northeast (Nakhon Phanom, Roi Et), the rejection even topped 75%.
