= 2000 Thai Senate election =

- 4 March 2000
- All 200 seats in the Senate
- Turnout: 72.08%
Party	Vote %	Seats
Independents	96.26	200
This lists parties that won seats. See the complete results below.

Senate elections were held for the first time in Thailand on 4 March 2000. All candidates ran as independents, as they were forbidden from running on a party ticket.

== Results ==
Party	Votes	%	Seats
Independents	27,675,577	96.26	200
Against all	1,075,903	3.74	–
Total	28,751,480	100.00	200
Valid votes	28,751,480	93.70	
Invalid/blank votes	1,932,560	6.30	
Total votes	30,684,040	100.00	
Registered voters/turnout	42,567,111	72.08	
Source: Nohlen et al.
