= Senate of Thailand =

Upper house of the National Assembly of Thailand

Senate of Thailand วุฒิสภา Wutthisapha
- 13th Senate of Thailand

Type
- Type: Upper house of the National Assembly of Thailand

Leadership
- President: Mongkol Surasajja since 26 July 2024
- First Vice-President: Kriangkrai Srirak since 26 July 2024
- Second Vice-President: Bunsong Noisophon since 26 July 2024

Structure
- Seats: 200
- Political groups: Nonpartisan (200)
- Length of term: Five years, non-renewable

Elections
- Voting system: Indirect limited voting with self-nomination
- First election: 24 May 1946 (indirect election) 4 March 2000 (direct election)
- Last election: 9–26 June 2024
- Next election: August–September 2029

Meeting place
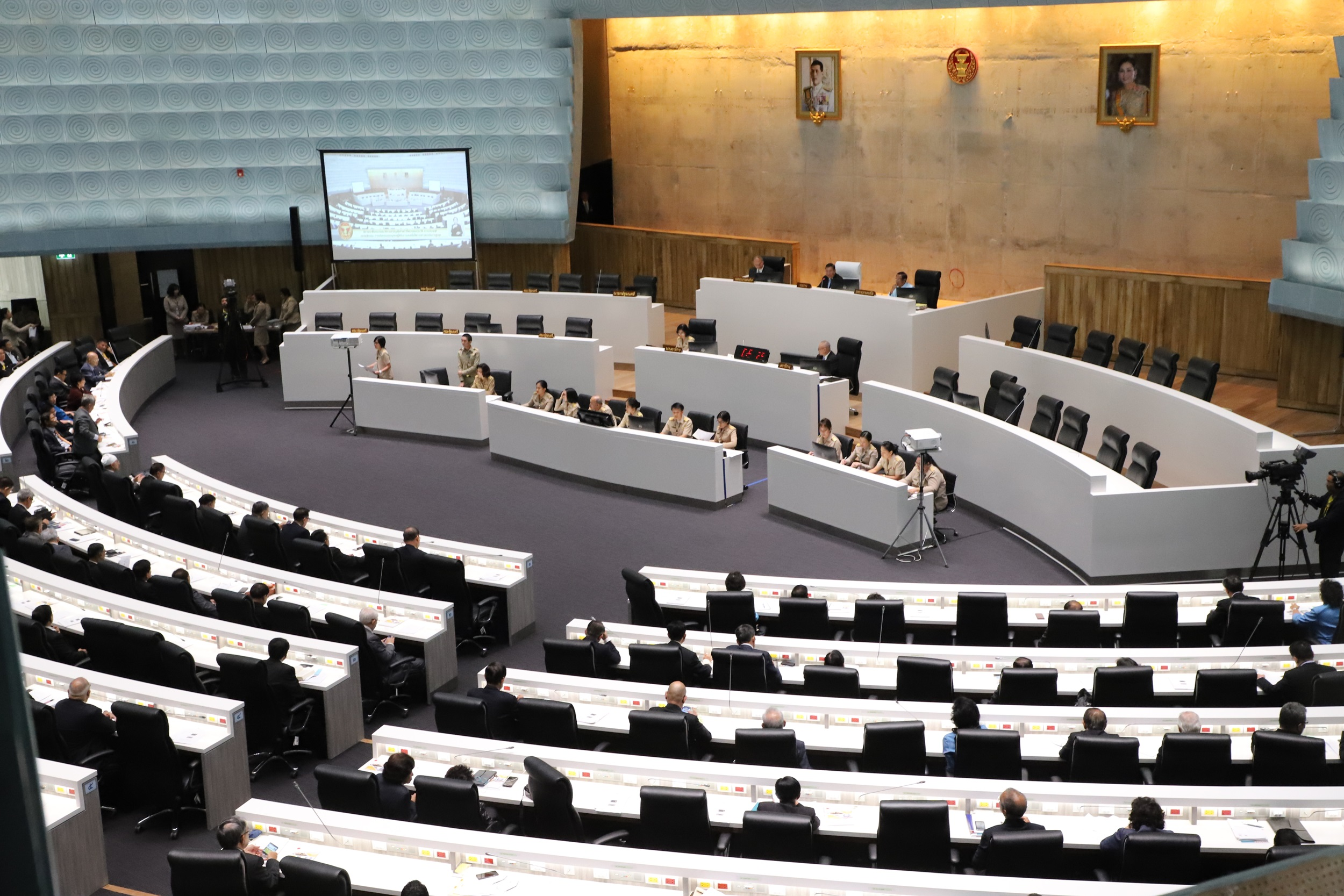
- Chandra Chamber; Sappaya-Sapasathan; Dusit District; Bangkok, Thailand

Website
- www.senate.go.th

The Senate (Note: Thai: วุฒิสภา, RTGS: Wutthisapha, pronounced [wút.tʰí.sā.pʰāː]; formerly known as the Phruetthasapha, Thai: พฤฒสภา, RTGS: Phruetthasapha, pronounced [pʰrɯ́t.tʰá.sā.pʰāː]) is the upper house of the National Assembly of Thailand, Thailand's legislative branch. In accordance with the 2017 constitution of Thailand, the Senate is a non-partisan legislative chamber, composed of 200 members. Senators are indirectly voted by the candidates from 20 professional and social groups and serve five year terms. In practice, the chamber is split into factions with political ties.

Thailand has not always had a senate. Some constitutions provided for senate, with senators being fully appointed, half-elected, and fully elected. Most recently, between 2014 and 2019, the senate was abolished and replaced by unicameral National Legislative Assembly.

== History ==
The idea of bicameralism first permeated Thai politics with the Constitution of 1946, when the government of Pridi Banomyong introduced a Senate modelled on the British House of Lords. For the first time, an upper house came into existence in Thailand. The Senate was to be fully elected, however, the elections would be indirect, as the House of Representatives would elect the senators, for six-year terms. The 1946 Constitution was soon abrogated in a military coup. Subsequent constitutions saw only occasional bicameralism, and when it did exist, the Senate was always filled with appointees from the military and the elite. The 1997 constitution saw a return to a fully elected Senate. That constitution was abrogated after the 2006 coup, and replaced with one calling for a half-elected/half-appointed Senate. The 2007 Constitution was itself repealed in 2018 following the 2014 coup, and replaced with a new one which provided for a fully appointed Senate.

- 1947 – First Thai Senate established with 100 members, all royally appointed.
- 1952 – Establishment of a unicameral National Assembly with 123 members.
- 1968 – Re-establishment of the Senate with 120 royally-appointed members.
- 1971 – The Thai Legislature is banned by Thanom Kittikachorn.
- 1975 – Return of the royally-appointed Senate.
- 1976 – Re-establishment of a unicameral National Assembly with 360 members, all royally appointed.
- 1979 – Return of a Senate with 225 royally-appointed members.
- 1991 – Establishment of a unicameral National Assembly with 292 royally-appointed members.
- 1992 – Return of a Senate with 270 royally-appointed members.
- 2000 – Establishment for the first time of a fully and directly elected Senate with 200 members for a 6-year term.
- 2006 – Following the military coup, an interim charter was signed establishing a 250-member National Legislative Assembly.
- 2008 – Half of the Senate is nominated, half is elected as established by referendum under the 2007 Constitution.
- 2014 – Following the military coup, an interim constitution was passed establishing a 220-member National Legislative Assembly.
- 2018 – After the signing of the 2017 Constitution, the National Assembly was reestablished and the NLA was dissolved
- 2019 – A new Senate, composed of 250 military-appointed members, was sworn in in the aftermath of the general elections held on that year.
- 2024 – After the Senate military-appointed terms expire, there will be an indirectly voted by the candidates from 20 professional and social groups to 200 members.

== Composition ==
The 200-person Senate is selected by the candidates that represent twenty professional and social groups: bureaucrats, teachers, judges, farmers, and private companies.

Even though the chamber is mandated to be nonpartisan, many media and analysts have identified political factions:

Factions of the 13th Senate
Faction	Person Nominated for President	Seats (Estimated)
Blue Group, with ties to Bhumjaithai Party	Mongkol Surasatja (president)	>150
New Breeds, which promote liberal and progressive agenda	Nantana Nantavaropas	<30
Unaffiliated/Others	Premsak Piayura	<30

Note: All of these numbers may not be 100% accurate.

== Qualifications ==
The qualifications for the membership of the Senate could be found in section 115, Part 3, Chapter 6 of the 2007 Constitution. A candidate intent on being a member of the Senate had to be a natural born citizen of Thailand as well as being 40 years or older on the year of election or selection. The candidate must have graduated with at least a bachelor's degree or an equivalent. Elected candidates must have been born, must have had a home and had to be registered to vote in the province which the candidate intended to represent. The candidate must not have been an ascendant, spouse or a child of a member of the House of Representatives or any person holding a political position and must not have been a member of a political party for at least five years.

All other disqualifications were similar to that of the House, the individual must not have been: addicted to drugs, been bankrupt, a convicted felon, a member of a local administration, a civil servant, a member of the judiciary or any other government agency. Being disenfranchised (being a member of the clergy, felon, or mentally infirm). If the candidate was a member of a local administration or a Minister he must have left his post for a period of at least five years before being eligible.

== Appointment ==
Depending on the situation in each constitution.

== Term ==
The term of the Senate is five years. The term is fixed, therefore the Senate cannot be dissolved under any circumstances and would be re-elected in accordance with a Royal Decree issued thirty days after the expiration of the term and those who were formerly senators under this constitution (2017) will not be able to return to their positions again.

== Membership ==
Members of the Senate are entitled use the title Senator in front of their names (Thai: สมาชิกวุฒิสภา or ส.ว.). Membership of an elected Senator began on the senate election day, while an appointed senator became a member after the publication of the election result by the Electoral Commission. Senators could not hold more than one consecutive term, therefore senators could not be re-elected. Senators continue to serve after their term is expired until a new Senator is confirmed. If there was a vacancy the seat was immediately filled either by election or appointment.

== Powers ==
The Senate shares many powers, if not more, than the House of Representatives; these include:

- Legislation
- Scrutiny
- Passing of annual Appropriations Bills
- Constitutional Amendments

Exclusive Powers:

- Creating and appointing committee to examine and investigate affairs.
- Passing approval resolutions advising the King in certain appointments.
  - Judges of the Constitutional Court of Thailand
  - Election Commissioners
  - Ombudsmen
  - Members of the National Anti-Corruption Commission, State Audit Commission (including the Auditor General) and National Human Rights Commission.
- The Senate also advised the selection and the actual selection of certain members of the Judiciary.
- Selection of its Officers.
- Expulsion of members.
- Determination of its own rules and procedures.

== Leadership ==
The Senate elected three presiding officers; one president and two vice presidents. The president of the Senate was also the ex-officio vice president of the National Assembly of Thailand. The election was done by secret ballot, after a resolution finalizing the selection the name was submitted to the king for formal appointment. There were no partisan officers as the Senate of Thailand was a non-partisan chamber.

== See also ==
- Constitutions of Thailand
- 2007 Constitution of Thailand
- National Assembly of Thailand
