= 2007 constitution of Thailand =

Fundamental law of Thailand from 2007 to 2014

The original copy of the 2007 constitution, written on a traditional folding book (samut thai). On the pages shown, King Bhumibol Adulyadej signed and applied his regnal seal (the seal of the garuda) and the three great seals (from left to right: the seal of the great mandate, the seal of the celestial elephant, and the seal of the phoenix castle). The copy is displayed at the National Assembly of Thailand along with the copies of the other constitutions.

The Constitution of the Kingdom of Thailand, Buddhist Era 2550 (2007) (Thai: รัฐธรรมนูญแห่งราชอาณาจักรไทย พุทธศักราช ๒๕๕๐; RTGS: Ratthathammanun Haeng Ratcha-anachak Thai Phutthasakkarat Song Phan Ha Roi Ha Sip) was the constitution of Thailand which was in effect from 2007 to 2014.

On 19 September 2006, the Royal Thai Armed Forces staged a coup d'état against then prime minister Thaksin Shinawatra, abrogated the 1997 constitution and formed a junta called Council for Democratic Reform (CDR). The 2006 interim constitution was then promulgated by King Bhumibol Adulyadej upon advice of the CDR leader, General Sonthi Boonyaratglin. The interim constitution established a Constitutional Convention (CC) and charged it with the duty to draft a new constitution before presenting the draft to the National Legislative Assembly (NLA), a legislature replacing the National Assembly abrogated by the CDR. The CC set up a constituent committee to draw up the draft. The committee consisted of thirty five members, of whom 25 were selected by the CC itself and the other 10 were selected by the CC upon advice of the CDR.

After the draft was approved by the CC and the NLA respectively, a national referendum was organised by the Election Commission on 19 August 2007, allowing the people to approve or deny the entire draft. 56.69 percent of the voters voted in favor of the draft, 41.37 percent voted against it and 1.94 percent were invalid votes. King Bhumibol Adulyadej signed it into law on 24 August 2007 and it came into force immediately.

Two amendments were made to this constitution, both in 2011. The first amendment modified the composition of the House of Representatives. The second revised the criteria governing the conclusion of treaties.

On 22 May 2014, the National Council for Peace and Order, a military junta which staged a coup d'état against the caretaker government, repealed the constitution, save the second chapter which concerns the king. The constitution was repealed and replaced by an interim constitution on 22 July 2014.

== 2006 Interim constitution ==
On 19 September 2006, a military junta seized power from the interim caretaker government of Thaksin Shinawatra and abrogated the Constitution of Thailand. It later established an interim constitution which specified a process for drafting the permanent constitution. The interim constitution:

- Prohibits the 100 members of the CC from being current members of a political party or being members of a political party for the previous 2 years (Art. 19)
- Spells out the peer-vote of a 2,000 member NLA to elect 200 candidates for the CC. Each member can vote for no more than three members, those nominated with the most votes will win. In the case of tied votes, which result in more than 200 winners, the winners will be decided by drawing lots. The peer-vote must complete in seven days (Art. 22).
- Empowers the CDR to pick 100 of 200 CC candidates for royal approval (Art. 22).
- Empowers the CDR to appoint a 100 member CC if the NLA fails to complete its selection within seven days (Art. 23)
- Empowers the 100 CC members to appoint 25 members of a constituent committee who may not be CC members. The CDR will appoint another 10 members. (Art. 25)
- Forces the constituent committee to explain the differences between its draft and the 1997 constitution. Forces the committee to present drafts to major state agencies and universities. Forces the committee to promote and hold public hearings (Art. 26).
- Allows half the members of the NLA to submit amendments to the constitution (Art. 27)
- Gives the constituent committee 30 days to compile feedback and amendments and compile a report stating why such amendments were accepted or rejected. The report will be presented to the CC for review along with the constitution for approval. Further amendments require a vote of 3/5's the membership of the CC (Art. 28)
- Sets the 180-day deadline to complete the charter drafting before organising the referendum on the new charter within 30 days. The referendum will be managed by the CC (Art. 29)
- Sets the 45-day deadline for the drafting of organic laws and bans the CDR members, NLA members and those involved in charter writing from contesting the general election and the senatorial race for two years (Art. 30)
- Allows the CDR and Cabinet, chaired by the CDR Chairman, to select any previous constitution and revise it for use if the constituent committee's draft is not approved by public referendum or the CC does not approve the constitution (Art. 32)

== Criticism of the drafting process ==
The drafting process met harsh public criticism. Key concerns included:

- The lack of controls for the drafting of a permanent constitution. Under Interim Constitution articles 19 and 21, the CDR would appoint a 2000-member NLA which would in seven days have to select 200 of its members to be candidates for the CC. Under charter articles 22 and 24, the CDR would select 100 of those candidates for royal appointment to the CC; it would also select its own president. The CC would then appoint 25 of its members as constitution writers, with the CDR directly appointing 10 writers. This process effectively gave the junta complete control over the permanent constitution.
- The lack of controls to prevent members of the CDR, its panels, or its committees from running in future elections. Under charter article 30, only the head of the CDR is banned.
- The use of an old charter if the permanent constitution not completed by a CDR-set deadline. The specific charter to revert to was not specified - the CDR and the Cabinet would choose which of Thailand's 16 previous charters to use. Many critics called for the use of the 1997 constitution.

Banjerd Singkhaneti, of Thammasat University, noted of the process for drafting a permanent constitution, "I think it will be a mess and the next constitution will be just that." Charoen Khumpeeraparp, of Silpakorn University, criticized the charter for protecting human rights according to commitments made under international treaties, claiming that it would not allow persecution of figures in the deposed government. Charoen claimed that no other countries let international commitments influence their local laws.

However, the draft interim charter did call for one democratic innovation: it required that a permanent constitution would have to be ratified by public referendum. This innovation was suggested in the draft 1974 Constitution, but was rejected by the royally-appointed Constitutional Convention. Nonetheless, the referendum proposal too has been condemned, as if the draft is rejected then under section 32 of the interim charter it is returned to the junta, which will write a constitution of its own in consultation with the Council of Ministers.

Khomsan Phokhong, of Sukhothai Thammathirat Open University, demanded greater public participation in the charter-drafting process as well as restrictions against participation by members and affiliates of the Thai Rak Thai party. Somkhid Lertphaithoon, Deputy Rector of Thammasat University, demanded that the junta directly appoint 100 members to the CC rather than rely on a 2000-member NLA. He also called the interim constitution the best of its kind although he was disappointed it did not include a mission statement.

Somchai Siripreechakul, Dean of Law at Chiang Mai University, urged Prime Minister Surayud Chulanont to call a general election as soon as possible and hand the task of drafting a charter to the elected parliament.

Among human rights groups, the Hong Kong-based regional body the Asian Human Rights Commission has issued a series of statements condemning the interim charter as a work of "constitutional fiction".

Federation for Democracy chairman Weng Tojirakarn called the new constitution as, "a joke drafted by a council of puppets."

With the draft facing mounting criticism, Premier Surayud promised that if the draft were approved on 19 August, he would hold national elections as early as 25 November 2007 (instead of September, as promised immediately after the coup, or late December, as later promised by the junta).

== Drafting process ==
=== Junta guidelines ===
In December, junta chief Sonthi Boonyaratglin issued several guidelines for the permanent constitution being drafted by the CDR's drafting body. These included:

- Restricting a prime minister to serving a maximum of two terms of office
- Preventing a government from acting as a caretaker administration after dissolving parliament.
- Making it easier to launch a no-confidence debate against the prime minister. Whereas the 1997 constitution required 200 out of the house's 500 MPs to launch a no-confidence debate against the prime minister, Sonthi demanded that 100 MPs be sufficient.

He also made several suggestions, including:

- Transforming the senate from an all-elected body in order to prevent relatives of politicians from being elected and thus perverting the non-partisan intent of the 1997 constitution.
- Allowing politicians to switch political parties at any time. The 1997 constitution required that any candidate for the house belong to a political party for 90 days before the registration date for an election.
- Banning the merger of political parties.

He also suggested that the term in office of village heads and kamnan be increased from 5 to 10 years, while the role of elected tambon administrative organisations be reduced.

Sonthi later denied dictating the content for the new constitution, but stated "We can't force them to do things but responsible people will know what the constitution should look like."

General Saprang Kalayanamitr, junta assistant secretary-general, noted that military coups against the government "should never be ruled out." The abrogated 1997 constitution had outlawed coups.

Despite repeated denials from the junta, public opinion persisted that the junta would enable their post-election grip on power via the clauses of the new constitution.

=== Selection of drafters ===
==== Initial selection ====
In December, the 2,000-member NLA elected 200 of its members as candidates for the CC. The voting was fraught with irregularities. The candidate with most votes was Okas Tepalakul from Chachoengsao Province, a virtually unknown car dealership owner who was a former classmate of junta-head Sonthi Boonyaratglin. BMW Thailand executive Pharani Leenuthapong received the second highest number of votes. The controversial selection also saw Suwit Pipatwilaikul, a little-known Nong Bua Lamphu construction contractor who received the third highest number of votes. There were no representatives of farmers or workers in the final selection. Of the 200 final nominees, the nominee who received the lowest number of votes received just seven votes. CC member Maj Pol Gen Krerk Kalayanimitr claimed that some votes may have been bought. Of the 200 nominees, 74 were public sector bureaucrats, 34 were academics, 38 were from the social sector, and 54 were from the private sector.

The voting itself was full of irregularities. CC members were lobbied in front of toilets and many CC members marked their ballots before entering the polling booths (Normally, voters are handed ballot papers only when they enter the booth). A soldier guarding the entrance to the parliament stopped a woman carrying 400,000 baht in cash. She refused to say why she was carrying so much money.

Of the 200 shortlisted nominees, 100 were approved by the junta to act as potential constitution drafters. The 100 included prominent anti-Thaksin critics like Chirmsak Pinthong, Karun Sai-ngarm, and Klanarong Chanthik. Among those approved were several who had received the lowest number of votes from the CC (7), including Phisit Lee-Atham, Wichai Roobkhamdee, Wicha Mahakhun, and Apichart Damdee. The three approved who received the greatest number of votes were Okart Tepalakul, Uthit Chuchuey, and Wuthisarn Tanchai.

Former Thammasat University Rector Noranit Sethabutra was unanimously voted president of the CC. Two other candidates, Sawat Chotipanich and Charun Pakdithanakul, were also nominated for the post, but withdrew their candidacies. Noranit pledged to complete drafting the new within 180 days.

==== Qualifications controversy ====
Members of the constituent committee selected by the 100-member CC were required to be either a professor or have held a position equivalent to director-general, or former senator or member of parliament. This requirement met with opposition among some members of the CC. However, CC Chairperson Noranit Sethabutra gained a consensus among the CC's 100 members that there was no time to rewrite qualification requirements. He said the six month time frame set down by the junta for producing a new constitution meant there was no time to amend the decree, which would require cabinet approval and the king's signature. Dissenting CC-member Karun Sai-ngam noted, "The CC is neglecting an important matter and in the future people will say, 'Look what the CC did. It merely closed its eyes and ears [and didn't oppose it]'." Sawaek Chinkool noted, "That's what they told us [to do]. We have been raped and we must accept it."

==== Direct CDR appointees ====
The junta nominated candidates to join the CC, ten of whom were selected to become part of the 35 members of the constituent committee. These selectees included anti-Thaksin activist and former CC president Prasong Soonsiri, Judge Advocate-General Attaporn Charoenpanit, Montri Sri-iamsa-ard, Atchaporn Charuchinda, Supot Kaimuk, legal expert Thongtong Chandrangsu, Detudom Krairit, Thanaboon Chiranuwat, Vichit Wichaisarn and Kanchanarat Leewirot. Prasong Soonsiri was later chosen to lead the drafting group.

=== Key issues ===
==== Religion ====
Drafters came under pressure from religious groups to name Buddhism as the national religion. Over 300,000 signed a petition in an attempt to sway the commission, and the leader of a Buddhist group threatened that Buddhists would reject the draft constitution in a public referendum if their demands were not met.

==== Human rights ====
The National Human Rights Commission asked to present suggestions as to what human rights clauses should be enshrined in the new constitution, but the request was rejected by the drafters. CC president Prasong Soonsiri claimed that the commission had "no time to listen to everyone." CC member Pairoj Phromsarn claimed "there will be no end" to deliberation if everyone were allowed to give suggestions.

==== Prime minister ====
The CC announced that future prime ministers and cabinet members should be barred from running the country in a caretaker capacity after the dissolution of the House of Representatives. An interim administration, under a person not formally titled prime minister to avoid legal confusion, would be selected by the Supreme Court, Supreme Administrative Court, and Constitution Tribunal. In justifying the move, Vicha Mahakun, one CC drafter, noted that politicians were like "hungry tigers, so are we really going to allow them to stay on [after House dissolution]? The country is already in a bad way." The proposal was attacked by several party leaders, including Thai Rak Thai Party caretaker executive Veera Musigapong, who noted that "They [the junta] hope that the next government will be a coalition and they can manage to be the leader of the coalition."

CC president Prasong Soonsiri supported a proposal that would not require that prime ministers be elected members of parliament. CC member Sriracha Charoenpanich, who was the main proponent for the clause, insisted that as many as 50 percent of the CC supported the move. He insisted that he was not defending the junta's interests. The clause was supported by General Somjet Boonthanom, CDR Secretary General, since it provided "a good way out" of political crises. Several notable figures attacked the clause as being undemocratic, including CC member Noranit Sethabutr, political scientist Somchai Srisuthiyakorn, Campaign for Popular Democracy Deputy Secretary-General Somkuan Promthong, Democrat Party Secretary-General Suthep Thaugsuban, and Thai Rak Thai party caretaker leader Chaturon Chaisang. Democrat Party leader Abhisit Vejjajiva said that efforts to include the clause "created public mistrust in the government."

==== Parliamentary representation ====
The CC announced that it would adopt a multi-seat constituency system for the House of Representatives, which would give each province at least three members of parliament. The system was used in the general election in 1995, while the 1997 constitution called for single-seat constituencies. A proportional representation system was announced, with 320 constituency MPs and 80 party-list MPs.

==== Senate ====
The CC's sub-panel on political institutions, chaired by Jarun Pukditanakul, concluded that the next constitution, the Senate would not be an elected body. The new Senate's 160 members would be selected via a national selection committee as well as provincial selection committees in each of the 76 provinces nationwide (not including Bangkok). Each provincial committee would name a list of 10 candidates, which would be narrowed down to one by the national committee. A senator for Bangkok would be selected directly by a national selection committee. The Election Commission would be responsible for selecting the remaining 84 senators.

The CC formally recommended that senators be appointed, claiming that it would solve the problem of nepotism. The recommendation was criticized by both the Democrat and Thai Rak Thai Parties.

Drafters defended the move to appoint senators. In a public hearing, former judge Wicha Mahakhun claimed that,

We all know elections are evil, but [why do] many people still want to see history repeated? People, especially academics, who want to see the constitution lead to genuine democracy, are naive. Electing senators is a problem, as seen in the past, so why don't people want judges to help select senators?

The former judge further claimed that the king placed his trust in the judiciary's proposed role in appointing the Senate, noting that "On April 9 [2006], His Majesty told the judges to perform their duties firmly and without caring what others might say. His Majesty said if the courts did not support good people, society could not survive. His Majesty said it was most imperative [for judges] to ensure justice. Even HM the King places trust in the judges; would you condemn them? The country collapsed because politicians played politics without principle, but these people [who want elected senators] have never learned from the [country's] crisis."

Other members of the judiciary rejected the proposal. Supreme Court Judge Wattanachai Chotechootrakul, chairman of the courts' committee reviewing the constitution draft, convened a meeting of concerned judges. The meeting concluded it was not the duty of judges to make political appointments. "It is inappropriate to make judges become involved [in politics] because it will lead to loss of independence and fairness of the courts," said Srawuth Benjakul, Deputy Secretary of the Office of the Courts of Justice and the courts' spokesperson. He said that assigning the courts to select leading members of so-called independent organisations would make the courts lose their impartiality.

==== Local administration ====
Village headmen and kamnan requested that the CC amend the law to permit them to remain in their post, once elected, until they reached 60 years of age. At the time, those who held the position had a term of five years. The Nakhon Ratchasima association of village headmen and kamnan headed the delegation of local administrative leaders. The association claimed that the current five year term allowed "troublemakers" like drug dealers to interfere with matters of local administration.

==== Amnesty for coup leaders ====
Constituent committee chairperson Prasong Soonsiri asked the CC to ensure that the military was given amnesty from prosecution. No previous permanent constitution contained clauses giving amnesty for rebellion. Prasong noted that "If staging a coup is wrong under the new charter, will the CDR be tried in a military court, or what? It won't be fair to them if, after the charter is adopted, they all ended up going to jail." CC member and permanent secretary at the Ministry of Justice Charan Phakdithanakul, agreed, noting that unless a clause was written in the new constitution to recognise the junta's action as legal, people could use a loophole to launch a lawsuit against the junta after the 2006 interim constitution expired. Charan said the clause should not specifically mention the CDR.

==== Others ====
The CC gave the Supreme Court-appointed Election Commission power to control a caretaker government concerning major decisions, including the appointment or dismissal of state or state enterprise officials, approval of government payments, and the use of government resources or personnel that could directly or indirectly affect election results. The clause was suggested by CC member Pichien Amnajworaprasert, who claimed that cabinet members, whose term is ended with house dissolution, do not need to stay on as caretaker ministers because they could abuse power to benefit their election campaigns.

=== Reactions ===
==== Thai Rak Thai party ====
The Thai Rak Thai party had several major objections to the draft constitution.

1. It disagreed with an appointed senate, claiming that it reflected a condescending view of the electorate.
2. It disagreed with Article 299, which provided amnesty to the military junta for staging the September coup.
3. It disagreed with Article 173, which forbade ministers who are MPs from voting for a prime minister facing a censure motion, claiming that it undermined the authority of elected politicians.
4. It disagreed with Articles 257 and 259, which barred politicians from interfering in the work of bureaucrats, claiming that it would make it difficult for governments to implement their policies.
5. It noted fear of a return to bureaucratic rule in government, with too much power handed to officials and the courts.

A court later terminated the party and banned its entire executive team of over a hundred from politics for five years due to election fraud.

==== Democrat Party ====
The Democrat Party supported the draft constitution. Party leader Abhisit Vejjajiva said the Democrat Party considered the new constitution similar to the 1997 constitution, but with improvements. "If we wanted to please the CDR we would reject the draft so it could pick a charter of its own choosing. If we reject the draft, it will be like handing out power to the Council. We have come up with this stand because we care about the national interest and want democracy to be restored soon," he said. Acknowledging the flaws of the new Constitution, Abhisit has also proposed, along with asking for cooperation from other political parties, to amend the constitution once he is in power.

=== Referendum ===
==== Junta campaigning ====
The Committee on Information and Public Dissemination of the CC led an advertising campaign to persuade voters to favour the draft constitution. Media used included all television, cable and radio stations, websites, print media outlets, government agencies, education institutions, billboards and places where crowds gather. All state-run schools and universities were involved in the campaign. Spots were aired from 06:00 until 22:00 with the message "Approve: New Constitution, close to the people". Billboards saying, "Love the King. Care about the King. Vote in a referendum. Accept the 2007 draft charter." were placed throughout the northeast.

The junta's propaganda campaign was criticized. "Broadcasting media under the control of the army and certain television stations have been misused by the state to convey false messages to persuade people to endorse the draft 2007 constitution," a statement issued by Midnight University said. The junta then agreed to a debate regarding the draft, but refused to air the debate on television, because it would create confusion among the public. A debate was later aired on Nation Channel, a subscription-only cable channel, rather than on one of the government-owned free-to-air channels.

In late-July, General Sonthi said that if the draft constitution failed the referendum, the junta would modify the 1997 constitution for permanent use. He also said that an election would definitely be held within 2007.

The government printed 19 million copies of the draft for public distribution prior to the referendum. However, none of the copies contained a translation into Malay, preventing people in the Malay-speaking southern provinces of Thailand from understanding the contents of the draft constitution. Despite this, eighteen Islamic organisations declared that they would accept a draft constitution and called for Muslims to also accept the draft.

Gen Sonthi has ordered the Internal Security Operations Command (ISOC) to use its nationwide staff to "promote proper understanding of the constitution" among rural people. ISOC spokesman Colonel Thanathip Sawangsaeng said provincial ISOC chiefs would use door-to-door tactics in their campaign to "educate" people so they will not be "tricked" into rejecting the draft. It was also revealed that the ISOC started their draft constitution "education" campaign in February, even before the draft constitution had been completed.

The junta announced that it would transport people to voting stations on the date of the referendum. Interior Minister Aree Wongaraya insisted that it was not illegal for the ministry to do so, adding that Prime Minister Surayud Chulanont has given his consent. In elections for the House of Representatives and the Senate, the Election Act states that it is a criminal offence to provide free transport for voters.

The junta's referendum campaign reached a peak in the final week before the referendum. On Sunday 12 August, Prime Minister Surayud Chulanont led cabinet ministers, senior government officials, and 100,000 people dressed in yellow from 17 central provinces in a rally from the Royal Plaza to Democracy Monument. Similar rallies were organised simultaneously in several other major provinces. Former Thai Rak Thai member Kuthep Saikrajang claimed that people at the rally were paid between 100 and 300 baht each to join the rally. He also claimed that the government had arranged transport to bring the people to Bangkok.

The Election Commission supported the junta's campaign. EC member Sumet Upanisakorn denied that the government acted illegally by summoning villagers to take part in a parades to accept the draft charter.

==== Restrictions against campaigning to reject the draft ====
The junta passed a law that made criticism of the draft and opposition to the constitutional referendum a criminal act. Political parties were not allowed to persuade voters to cast ballots in favour or not in favour of the constitution. Any violators could be banned from politics for five years and jailed for 10 years.

The restrictions against opposition to the draft were criticized by human rights bodies. "Even if amended to allow for 'factual' campaigning on the referendum, it is clear that the main purpose of the law is to intimidate and silence persons who don’t share the official view," the Asian Human Rights Commission (AHRC) said. "Meanwhile the administration is pumping vast amounts of money into Yes propaganda that is set to increase quickly."

The ban against campaigning against the constitution was enforced. In July, 20 soldiers and 10 policemen raided the house of a politician and seized anti-charter t-shirts, banners, documents, and recorded speeches. Police also raided the Duang Prateep Foundation of former Senator Prateep Ungsongtham Hata and confiscated 4,000 posters which carried the message "It's not illegal to vote against the draft constitution." No charges were filed. The police claimed they were acting on orders from the military. "They could not cite any law to back up their actions," said Sombat Boon-ngam-anong. Prateep filed a complaint with the police, claiming that they had committed an "unlawful" act, citing her human rights under the abrogated 1997 constitution.

The junta also claimed that general democratic elections would only occur if the draft were approved. Defense Minister Boonrawd Somtas told reporters that an election "can take place only if the new constitution passes the referendum," implying that a "No" would result in indefinite military rule.

Taxi-drivers were banned from putting anti-draft bumper stickers on their vehicles.

Interior minister Aree Wong-Arya warned those campaigning against the draft by distributing leaflets to voters that they will be severely punished if there is proof against them.

On 11 August in Kamphaeng Phet Province, military officers raided a shop printing leaflets that attacked the draft. Eight boxes of leaflets and the printing press were seized for investigation. The raid was conducted under a government emergency decree.

At the time of the referendum, martial law was in place in 35 provinces, intimidating those who wished to campaign against the draft.

==== Accusations of vote-buying ====
Prime Minister Surayud accused people in the northeast of taking bribes to vote against the charter. He did not display any evidence to support his accusation or file charges against the people he claimed took or paid the money.

Constitution drafter Prasong Soonsiri and Prime Minister's Office Minister Thirapat Serirangsan both accused former members of the Thai Rak Thai party of buying "no" votes. Neither offered any evidence. The Election Commission urged Prasong to reveal the identity of the alleged vote-buyers and to file charges. Prasong refused to do so.

Democrat Party Deputy Leader Vitoon Namabutr claimed that former members of the Thai Rak Thai party were bribing people to vote against the draft with compact discs and shirts. He also did not display any evidence or file charges.

Former leaders of the Thai Rak Thai party denied the accusations.

The accusations were criticized by Matichon, which noted in an editorial that, "Members of the public are at a loss. They don't know whether real attempts are being made to sink the charter, or is it all part of a smear campaign."

==== Criticisms of the referendum ====
The campaigning process leading to the referendum was harshly criticized. Giles Ji Ungpakorn of Chulalongkorn University noted that,

It is now obvious that the military junta have no intention of conducting a clean and democratic referendum on their new constitution. While the government is shamelessly spending millions of the public's baht on propaganda urging the population to vote "yes" and accept the constitution, those who are opposed to it are prevented from campaigning properly by arrests, threats and a total lack of access in the media. The referendum cannot therefore be regarded as democratic, according to any international or Thai standards...

It is necessary to remind ourselves that those in the People's Alliance for Democracy (P.A.D.) and those intellectuals and academics who welcomed the coup as the "only way to get rid of Thaksin's authoritarianism", used the excuse of a "dirty election" on the 2nd April 2006 to justify the coup and to justify collaborating with the junta. The present referendum is infinitely more dirty and undemocratic compared to the 2nd of April election, which was a kind of referendum on the Thaksin government. At that time we and many others were able to campaign openly for a "no" vote against Thaksin without any threats or hindrance. The press carried the views of those who opposed the government. Yet we hear no protests from the ex-members of the P.A.D. or from the pro-coup intellectuals about the way the junta's referendum is being conducted.

In an editorial, the Bangkok Post noted,

Martial law is in place across half the country. That is the harsh reality of today, and it is not an environment that would be conducive to a free and fair referendum. Any referendum carried out under the current repressive climate and alleged forced voting cannot be used to chart the path of the future of a democracy.

== See also ==
- 1997 constitution of Thailand
- 2006 Thai coup d'état
- Constitution of Thailand
- Council for Democratic Reform (later renamed to Council for National Security)
- Sonthi Boonyaratglin
