= Constitution of Thailand =

Supreme law of Thailand

Constitution of the Kingdom of Thailand
- Preamble of the Constitution

Overview
- Original title: รัฐธรรมนูญแห่งราชอาณาจักรไทย
- Jurisdiction: Thailand
- Created: 5 October 2015
- Presented: 29 March 2016
- Ratified: 6 April 2017
- Date effective: 6 April 2017
- System: Unitary parliamentary constitutional monarchy (Note: Officially a democratic form of government with the King as head of state)

Government structure
- Branches: 3
- Head of state: Monarch
- Chambers: Bicameral (National Assembly: Senate, House of Representatives)
- Executive: Cabinet, led by a Prime Minister
- Judiciary: Supreme Court
- Federalism: Unitary
- Electoral college: No

History
- First legislature: 24 March 2019 (House of Representatives); 11 May 2019 (Senate)
- First executive: 9 June 2019
- First court: 1 October 2017
- Amendments: 1
- Last amended: 7 November 2021
- Author: Constitution Drafting Commission
- Signatories: Vajiralongkorn
- Supersedes: 2014 interim constitution of Thailand

Full text
- Constitution of the Kingdom of Thailand (2017) at Wikisource

Wikisource
- Constitution of Thailand

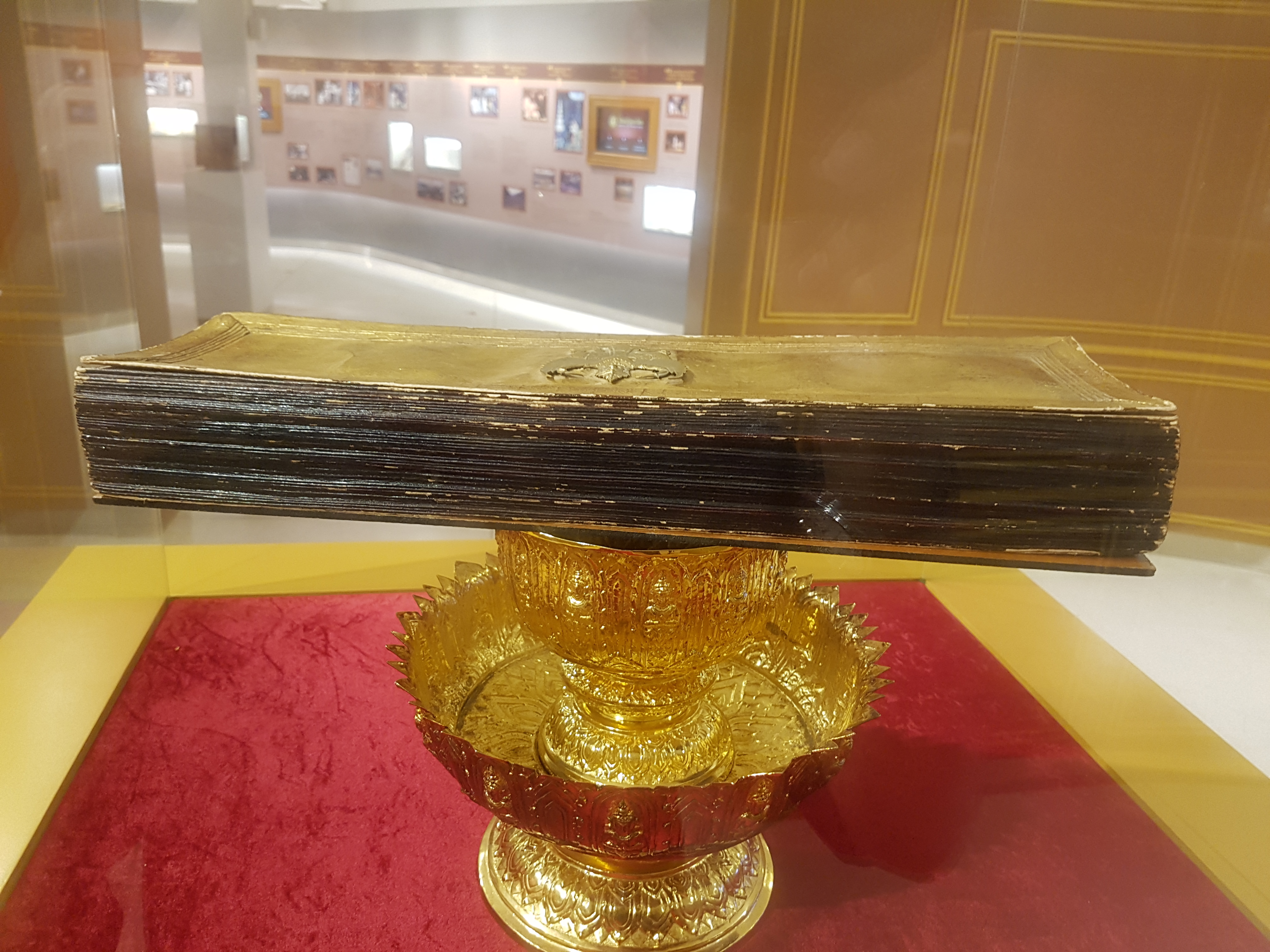
The original copy of the 1932 constitution of Siam, the first constitution of Thailand, displayed at the Thai Parliament Museum, Bangkok. Each constitution was made in three copies handwritten on traditional folding books, kept at the Parliament Secretariat, the Cabinet Secretariat, and the King's Secretariat, respectively.

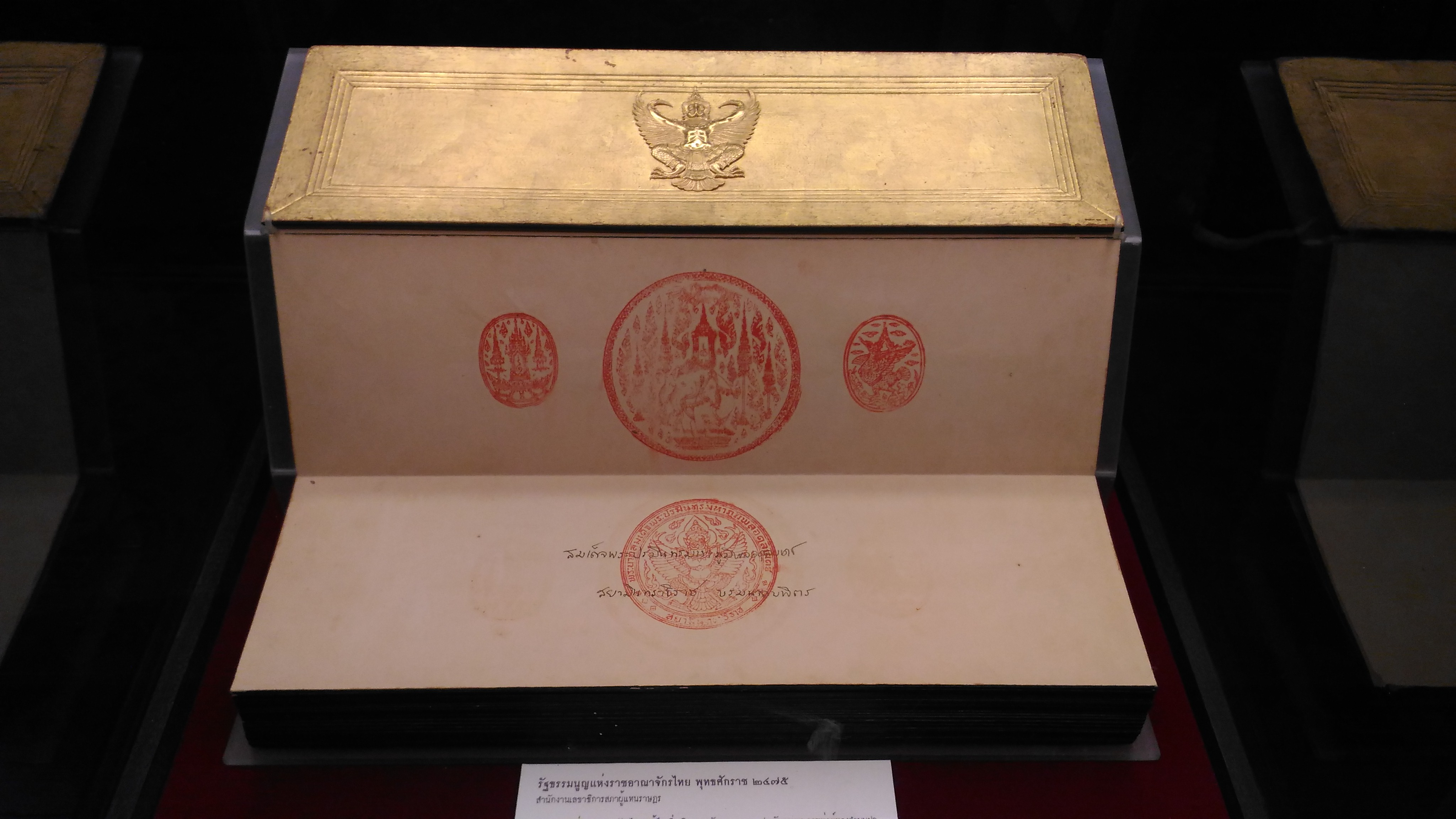
The initial pages of the 1952 constitution of Thailand, to which King Bhumibol Adulyadej affixed his signature and his regnal seal, accompanied by the three seals of the realm on the above.

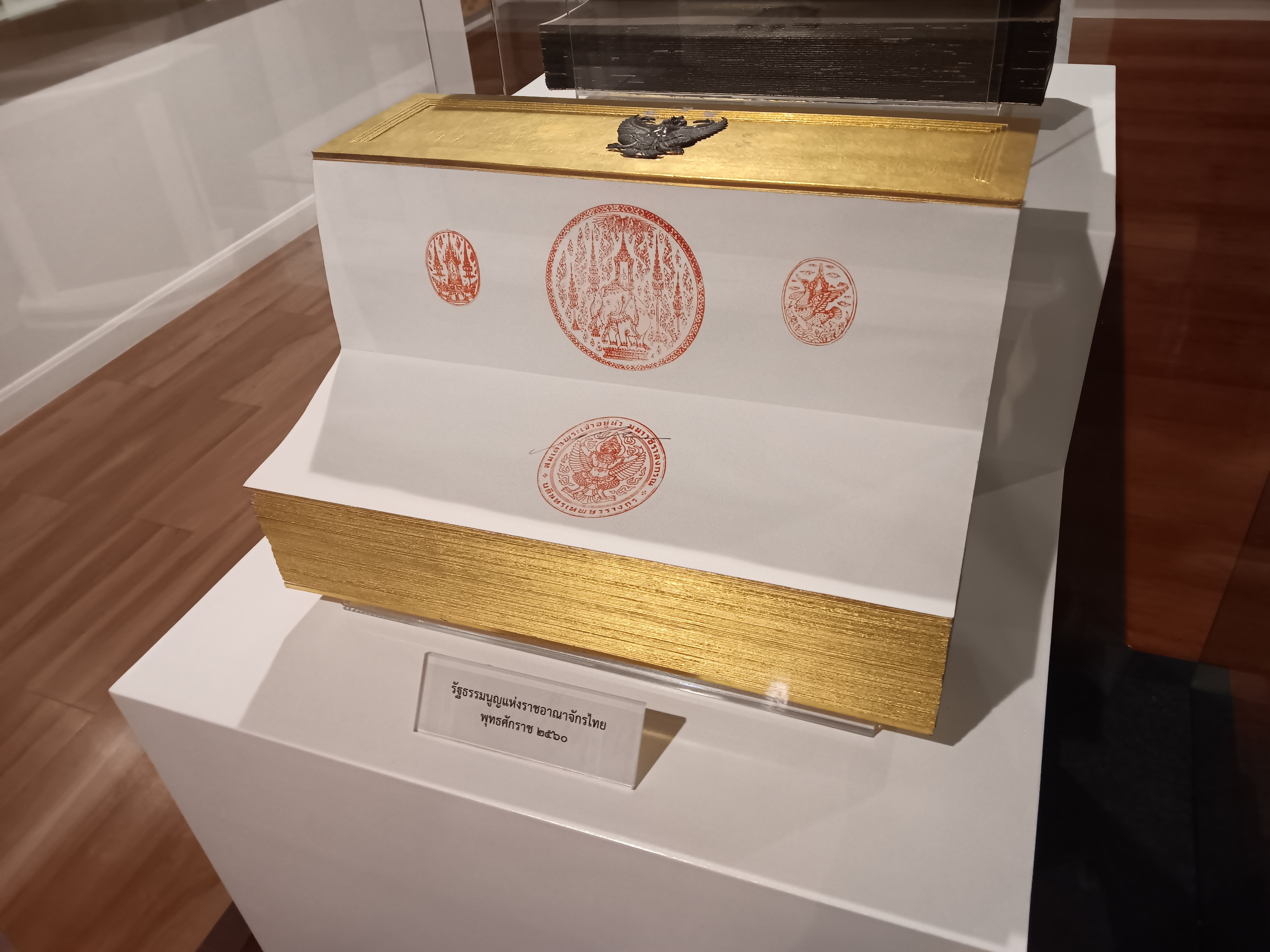
The exact copy of the manuscript of the 2017 Constitution of Thailand, displayed in the Prime Ministers' Hall of Fame, Museum of Thai Royal Decorations, Secretariat of the Cabinet, Government House of Thailand

The Constitution of the Kingdom of Thailand (Thai: รัฐธรรมนูญแห่งราชอาณาจักรไทย; RTGS: Ratthathammanun Haeng Ratcha-anachak Thai) provides the basis for the rule of law in Thailand. Since the abolition of the absolute monarchy in 1932, Thailand has had 20 charters or constitutions. Many changes followed military coups, reflecting the high degree of political instability in the country. After each successful coup, military regimes abrogated the existing constitution, generally without public consultation.

The 1997 constitution of Thailand, often called the "people's constitution", was considered a landmark in terms of the degree of public participation involved in its drafting as well as the democratic nature of its articles. It stipulated an elected bicameral legislature, and many human rights were explicitly acknowledged for the first time. Many of these reforms disappeared in the military coup of 2006.

The current constitution was adopted in 2017. The 105-page, 279-article proposed constitution was approved by 61.4 percent of Thai voters with 59.4 percent of the public participating. It allows the National Council for Peace and Order (NCPO) to appoint an eight to ten person panel who will choose Senators, and includes six seats reserved for the heads of the Royal Thai Army, Navy, Air Force, and Police, plus the military's supreme commander, and defense permanent secretary. The bicameral Parliament could also select a candidate as Prime Minister who is not one of its members or even a politician. Critics suggest it effectively allows the military to control the government whatever the outcome of subsequent elections.

== History ==
The Rattanakosin Kingdom and the three traditionally counted preceding kingdoms, collectively called Siam, had an uncodified constitution until 1932. In the preamble to the Penal Code promulgated 1 April 1908, which came into effect on 21 September, King Chulalongkorn (Rama V) stated: "In the ancient times the monarchs of the Siamese nation governed their people with laws which were originally derived from the Dhamasustra of Manu, which was then the prevailing law among the inhabitants of India and the neighbouring countries."

The transition from absolute monarchy to constitutional monarchy began when King Prajadhipok (Rama VII) agreed to a codified constitution to resolve the bloodless coup of 1932. The king signed a temporary charter on 27 June 1932 at 17:00, which began by announcing that "the highest power in the land belongs to all people."

A significant disadvantage of a codified constitution is that controversies arise due to different understandings of the usages and customs from which the fundamental provisions of the constitution derive.

Since 1932, Thailand has had 20 charters or constitutions (as of 2015)—an average of one roughly every four years—many adopted following military coups, which reflects a high degree of political instability. After each successful coup, military regimes abrogated existing constitutions and promulgated new ones. Parliamentary institutions, as defined by Thailand's fourteen constitutions between 1932 and 1987, and competition among civilian politicians, have generally been facades for military governments.

All of these called for a constitutional monarchy, but with widely differing separation of powers between the branches of government. Most of them stipulated parliamentary systems, but several of them also called for dictatorships, such as the 1957 Charter. Both unicameral and bicameral parliaments have been used, and members of parliament have been both elected and appointed. The direct powers of the monarch have also varied considerably.

The 1997 constitution of Thailand, often called the "people's constitution", was considered a landmark in terms of the degree of public participation involved in its drafting as well as the democratic nature of its articles. It stipulated a bicameral legislature, both houses of which were elected. Many human rights were explicitly acknowledged for the first time, and measures were established to increase the stability of elected governments.

The 2007 Constitution of Thailand was promulgated in 2007, replacing the 2006 Interim Constitution that was promulgated after the army-led September 2006 Thailand coup. The 2007 Constitution was written by a group of drafters appointed by the army-led Council for National Security, but was approved by a public referendum. Prior to the referendum, the military junta passed a law making it illegal to publicly criticize the draft. Controversial features in the constitution included a partly-appointed Senate and amnesty for the leaders of the 2006 coup.

The most recent constitution went into effect on 6 April 2017.

== Current constitution ==
The current constitution, known as the 2017 Constitution, contains a preamble and 16 chapters and transitory provisions:

=== Chapters ===
- Chapter I: General Provisions
- Chapter II: The King
- Chapter III: Rights and Liberties of the Thai People
- Chapter IV: Duties of the Thai People
- Chapter V: Duties of the State
- Chapter VI: Directive Principles of State Poltcies
- Chapter VII: The National Assembly
- Chapter VIII: The Council of Ministers
- Chapter IX: Conflict of Interest
- Chapter X: The Courts
- Chapter XI: Constitution Court
- Chapter XII: Independent Organs
- Chapter XIII: State Attorney Organ
- Chapter XIV: Local Administration
- Chapter XV: Amendment to the Constitution
- Chapter XVI: National Reform
- Transitory Provision

== Overview ==
Siam (today known as Thailand) has had 20 constitutions and charters since the overthrow of absolute monarchy in 1932.

1. Temporary Charter for the Administration of Siam Act 1932
2. Constitution of the Kingdom of Siam 1932
3. Constitution of the Kingdom of Thailand 1946
4. Constitution of the Kingdom of Thailand (Interim) 1947
5. Constitution of the Kingdom of Thailand 1949
6. Constitution of the Kingdom of Thailand 1932 (Revised 1952)
7. Charter for the Administration of the Kingdom 1959
8. Constitution of the Kingdom of Thailand 1968
9. Interim Charter for Administration of the Kingdom 1972
10. Constitution of the Kingdom of Thailand 1974
11. Constitution for Administration of the Kingdom 1976
12. Charter for Administration of the Kingdom 1977
13. Constitution of the Kingdom of Thailand 1978
14. Charter for Administration of the Kingdom 1991
15. Constitution of the Kingdom of Thailand 1991
16. Constitution of the Kingdom of Thailand 1997
17. Constitution of the Kingdom of Thailand (Interim) 2006
18. Constitution of the Kingdom of Thailand 2007
19. Constitution of the Kingdom of Thailand (Interim) 2014
20. Constitution of the Kingdom of Thailand 2017

Charters have traditionally been temporary instruments, promulgated following military coups. However, some charters, for instance the 1959 Charter of military dictator Sarit Dhanarajata, were used for years at a time. The 2006 coup resulted in an interim constitution rather than an interim charter.

The great number of charters and constitutions since 1932 is indicative of the degree of political instability in Thailand. The majority of charters and constitutions were the direct or indirect result of military coups. Charters and constitutions for much of Thai history can be thought of not as instruments of the people to control the government, but as instruments by which a government controls its people.

All of Thailand's charters and constitutions have allowed a constitutional monarchy. Widely varying, however, have been the strength of the legislature, the percentage of legislators appointed versus elected, the power of the monarch, and the strength of the executive. These parameters have been influenced by the political and military strength of the regime and the degree of support from the king and the palace. For instance, the 1959 Charter gave Sarit Dhanarajata absolute power over the executive and the legislature, which reflected the overwhelming strength with which he executed a coup over Plaek Pibulsonggram as well as his strong support from the palace.

Based on the degree by which the legislature is elected, Thailand's 20 constitutions and charters can be categorized into three groups:

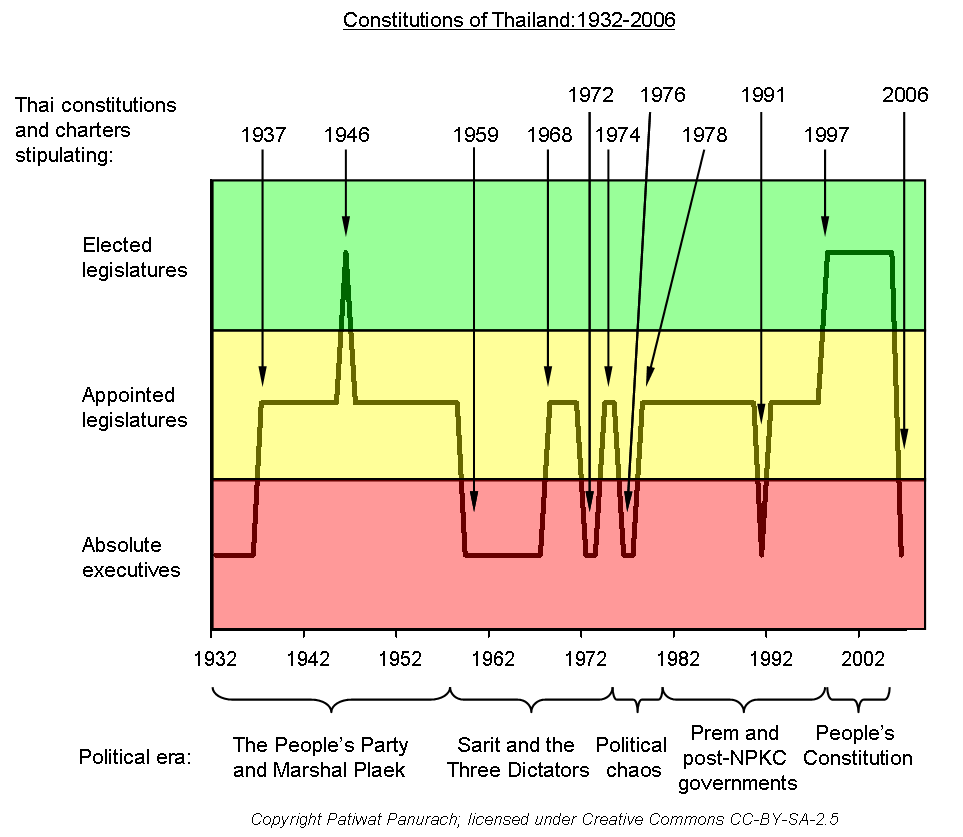

1. Elected legislatures: The legislature is completely elected. This included the 1946 Constitution where the elected House selected the Senate and the 1997 constitution where both the House and Senate are elected.
2. Appointed legislatures: The legislature is partly elected and partly appointed by the executive. The appointed members of the legislature are sufficient to limit the power of the elected representatives. The prime minister is either a military leader or a figurehead of the military or the palace. This includes the 1932 constitution (after 1937), the 1947 Charter, the 1949 Constitution, the 1952 Constitution, the 1968 Constitution, the 1974 Constitution, the 1978 Constitution, the 1991 Constitution, the 2007 Constitution, and the 2017 Constitution.
3. Absolute executives: The executive has absolute or near absolute power, with either no legislature or a completely appointed legislature. The prime minister is usually a military leader or a figurehead of the military or the palace. This includes the 1932 Charter, the 1932 constitution (before 1937), the 1959 Charter, the 1972 Charter, the 1976 Constitution, the 1991 Charter, the 2006 Interim Charter, and the 2014 Interim Constitution.

== 1932 temporary charter ==
On 24 June 1932, the Khana Ratsadon, a coalition of civil servants, princes, and army officers, seized power in a bloodless coup. A provisional constitution was sent to King Prajadhipok along with an ultimatum from party leaders. On 26 June, the king met the party leaders and refused to sign the charter. The next day, the king met the leaders again and signed the charter.

The People's Party leaders generally followed the British parliamentary structure for the temporary charter. However, there were key differences, particularly regarding the powers of the monarch.

The charter began by stating that sovereign power belongs to the people of Siam. Empowered to exercise power on behalf of the people were the People's Assembly (the legislature) a 70-member, all appointed by the Khana Ratsadon, a 15-member People's Committee of Siam (the executive), the courts of law (the judiciary), and the monarch. Members of the People's Assembly and the People's Committee were initially appointed. After 10 years or after half the population had completed primary education, the Assembly would be completely elected.

The monarch was not held to be infallible. He had a limited degree of sovereign immunity: although he could not be prosecuted in an ordinary court of law, the Assembly could impeach and try him. The monarch did not have the right to grant pardons.

Several other features would be mirrored in later constitutions. The monarch would not have an absolute veto. Any law vetoed by the king was sent back to the Assembly, which could approve it with a simple majority. The charter followed the 1924 Palace Law with regards to succession. The Assembly, however, reserved the right to formally approve the successor.

In practice, the People's Party made many concessions to the palace in putting together the new government. The premiership and the foreign ministry were given to two hard-line royalists: Phraya Manopakorn Nitithada and Phraya Srivisan Vacha. A total of four members of the People's Committee were royalists who were not part of the People's Party. Of the 70 members of the legislature, less than half came from the People's Party, while the majority were high-ranking officials of the old regime.

Despite this, the charter provoked fierce resistance from the palace. The new government reduced the palace budget and passed a taxation law that burdened the kingdom's largest landowners, who were mostly nobles. In September 1932, a senior prince threatened the king's abdication if a permanent constitution did not grant the palace greater power.

== 1932 constitution ==
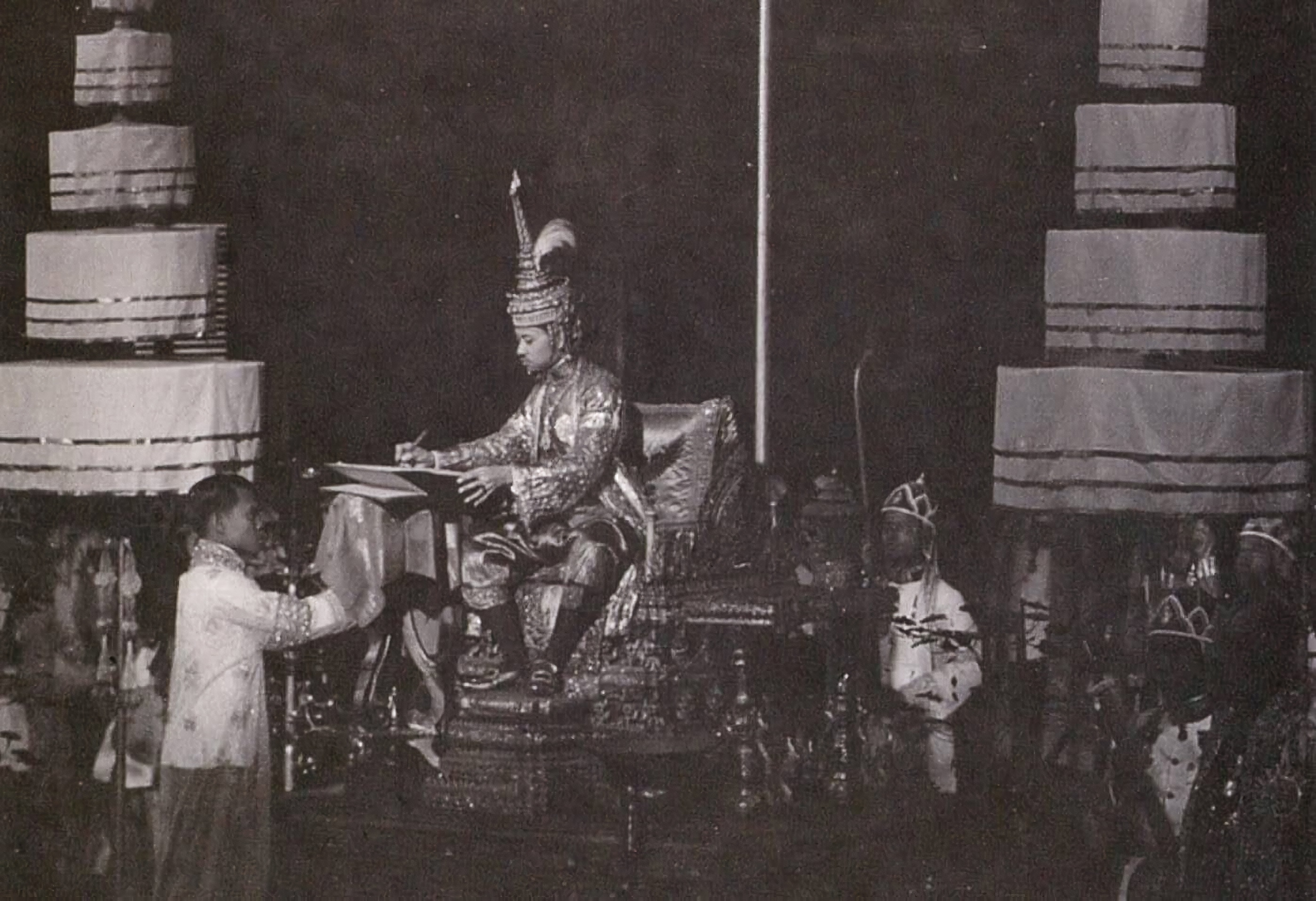
King Prajadhipok (Rama VII) signed the 1932 "Permanent" Constitution of the Kingdom of Siam on 10 December 1932.

The People's Party, facing an internal power struggle and opposition from the king, promulgated a permanent constitution on 10 December 1932 that gave the monarchy a significant increase in authority compared to the temporary charter. This day, 10 December, is currently celebrated as Constitution Day.

The constitution continued to state that sovereign power belonged to the people of Siam. However, unlike the temporary charter, the monarchy would now be the direct exerciser of that power, rather than the branches of government. This royal power would be exercised by and with the advice and consent of the People's Assembly, the State Council (the cabinet), and the courts. However, the monarchy lacked any say in the composition of any of the branches of government and the royal veto could still be overruled. The monarchy was also made "sacred and inviolable", in contrast to the temporary charter.

After the new constitution was adopted, a new 20-member cabinet was formed; 10 of whom came from the People's Party. On 7 January 1933, the Nationalist Party (Thai: คณะชาติ) was officially registered, with Luang Vichitvadakan, Phraya Thonawanikmontri, and Phraya Senasongkhram as leaders. The People's Party had been officially registered in August 1932. The Assembly was expanded to 156 members, 76 elected and 76 appointed.

=== Demands for constitutional reform ===
On 31 January 1933, the king sent a letter to the premier requesting that all political parties be abolished. On 14 April, the premier disbanded the People's Party. He later adjourned the legislature and reshuffled the leadership of the army, giving leadership to Phraya Phichaisongkhram and Phraya Sri Sithi Songkhram, both military leaders during the absolute monarchy. On 20 June, the remnants of the People's Party military faction seized power and reinstated the legislature.

In August 1933, the government began registering candidates for village representatives who would cast votes in indirect elections for half of the legislature. It also started registering candidates for the legislature. Elections in some provinces started in October, but most were held in November.

In the midst of the elections, in October 1933, royalist factions led by Prince Boworadej and Phraya Sri Sitthi Songkhram led a rebellion against the government. After two weeks of violent fighting, during which Bangkok was bombed and Sri Sitthi Songkhram was killed, the People's Party defeated the rebels. Prince Boworadej fled abroad. Prince King Prajadhipok, who claimed neutrality during the conflict, fled to England a few weeks after the defeat.

From London, the king issued an ultimatum: in exchange for his return, and the legitimacy it lent to the People's Party, the king demanded several constitutional reforms. These included the right to select half of the legislature, control over the royal budget, and veto power that could be overridden only by a three-fourths majority of the legislature. The king also demanded the right to try capital cases, in this case, to free rebel soldiers. At the time, The New York Times reported that the king also threatened to sell the throne's substantial assets, including land, palaces, and the Emerald Buddha. The People's Party rejected the ultimatum, and in March 1935, Prajadhipok abdicated.

Direct democratic elections for half of the People's Assembly were first held on 7 November 1937. Women had the right to vote and stand for elections.

== 1946 constitution ==
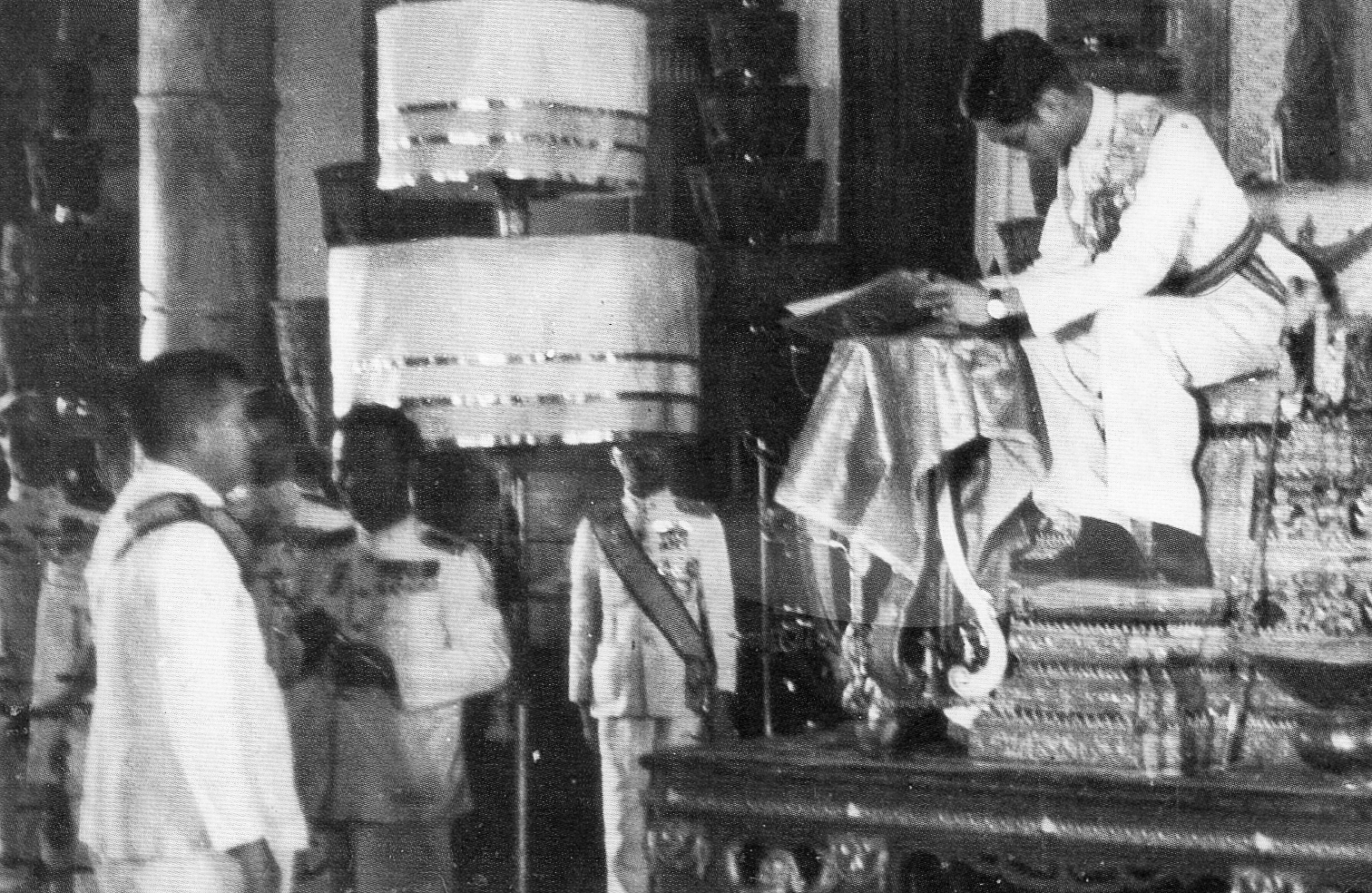
King Ananda Mahidol (Rama VIII) signed the 1946 Constitution of the Kingdom of Siam on 9 May 1946.

At the end of the World War II, the collaborationist leadership (including Marshal Plaek) was arrested and tried for war crimes, democratic elections for the entire People's Assembly were first held, and the young King Ananda Mahidol returned to Thailand for the first time in seven years. King Ananda Mahidol had just come of age, turning 20 in September 1945, and returned with his mother and Prince Bhumibol in December 1945.

A new constitution, Thailand's most democratic until the enactment of the 1997 People's constitution, was drafted in his honor. In 1972, Pridi Banomyong called it the constitution that gave the Thai people the most complete democratic rights, though these guarantees were later surpassed by those of the 1997 and 2007 constitutions. One key difference from previous constitutions was that the House of Representatives would, for the first time, be fully elected by the people (176 members). A Senate (80 members) was also established, which would, unlike the British House of Lords, be elected by the House for six-year terms. In addition, active civil servants and soldiers were banned from serving in the parliament or cabinet, thus reducing the power of the military. A ban on senior princes participating in electoral politics was repealed, thus precluding only the king and four other people from politics.

The constitution was promulgated on 9 May 1946. One month later, on 9 June 1946, the king was found shot to death. His death was soon followed by a military uprising on 8 November 1947 that abrogated the 1946 constitution.

== 1947 charter ==
The military overthrew the elected government of Rear Admiral Thamrong Navasavat on 8 November 1947, amid the political chaos that followed the official finding that the mysterious death of King Ananda Mahidol was not due to suicide. The coup restored power to Marshal Plaek, and was supported by Phin Choonhavan, Seni Pramoj, and the palace. The coup leaders alleged that government corruption had demeaned the sacredness of King Ananda's 1946 Constitution, as proven by the appearance of vultures at the royal cremation ground. Vultures had also appeared in Ayutthaya before it fell to the Burmese, and this was used as justification for the military's coup.

The regent, Prince Rangsit officially accepted the coup within 24 hours and immediately promulgated the new charter the coup leaders had drafted. The king, who at the time was studying in Lausanne, endorsed the coup and the charter on 25 November, noting "Those who were involved in this operation do not desire power for their own good, but aim only to strengthen the new government which will administer for the prosperity of the nation and for the elimination of all the ills suffered presently."

The new charter gave the palace a persistent demand: a permanent Supreme State Council (later to be transformed into the Privy Council) to advise the monarch and handle his personal affairs. The council would be composed of five members, appointed by the monarch and acting as a regency council in his absence. The Supreme State Council had been banned after the 1932 revolution. The palace was also given increased control over its own operations, including the royal household, the privy purse, and the royal guards. The king was given several emergency prerogatives, such as the ability to declare war and martial law.

A monarch-appointed senate with 100 members was established, equal in size to the house of representatives. As in previous constitutions, the monarch still did not have an absolute veto. However, the monarch-appointed senate could, through a simple majority over the combined houses of parliament, sustain a royal veto. The chairman of the Supreme State Council had to countersign any royal orders in order to make them official (when the constitution was announced, Bhumibol Adulyadej was still a minor and the privy council performed the king's regnal duties on his behalf. Thus in practice, the Supreme Council of State itself selected and appointed senators and had the power of veto). The ban on civil servants and soldiers serving in parliament and the cabinet was removed. Another key change stated that the policies of one government could not be altered by a succeeding government without royal approval. A multi-member constituency system replaced the single member constituency system which had been in effect since 1932. The minimum age of electoral candidates was raised from 23 to 35. Numerous MPs elected under the 1946 constitution had been under the age of 30, but were ineligible under the junta's constitution.

Surprisingly, the palace/privy council rejected the slate of senate appointees proposed by the military. It instead filled the senate with princes, nobles, and palace-friendly businessmen, leaving only eight appointees from the military's slate. With control over palace operations, the palace purged nearly 60 officials, clearing out earlier appointees from previous governments.

Khuang Aphaiwong was appointed prime minister, and it was agreed that a new constitution would be drafted following House elections, which occurred on 29 January 1948. The Seni Pramoj and Khuang Aphaiwong-led Democrats won a majority and appointed a cabinet packed with palace allies. Tension between the military and the palace increased, until in April, a group of generals met with Khuang and Prince Rangsit, successfully demanding that Khuang resign and Marshal Plaek be appointed premier.

== 1949 constitution ==
The constitution of 1949 was promulgated on 23 January 1949 as a permanent instrument to replace the temporary 1948 charter. The drafting committee was headed by Seni Pramoj and dominated by royalists under the direction of Prince Rangsit and Prince Dhani.

The 1949 constitution elevated the throne to its most powerful position since the 1932 overthrow of the absolute monarchy. The Supreme Council of State was transformed into a nine-person Privy Council. For the first time, members this council would be selected by the king alone. A 100-member senate would also be selected by the king alone. The president of the privy council, rather than the prime minister, would countersign all laws. The king's veto was strengthened, with a two-thirds vote of parliament required to overrule it.

The king could issue his own decrees with authority equal to that of the government. The king also gained the power to call for a plebiscite, the ability to amend the constitution via public referendum, bypassing parliament and the government. At succession, the privy council would name an heir, not parliament.

== 1952 constitution ==
On 29 November 1951, as the king was returning to Thailand from Switzerland via ship, the military seized power from Privy Council President Dhani, abrogated the 1949 constitution, and appointed Marshal Plaek as regent. A single 123-member national assembly was appointed, 103 of whom were from the military or police.

The assembly re-used the 1932 constitution with some additional amendments, namely allowing a privy council rather than a supreme council of state and using multi-member legislative constituencies rather than single-member constituencies. Half of the legislature was appointed. After much confrontation between the government and the palace in early 1952, the king promulgated the constitution unchanged on 8 March 1952. Democratic elections were held for half of the legislature in March 1952. Nearly all of the appointed parliamentary members were army officers. Legislative elections were held again in March 1957.

== 1959 charter ==
On the evening of 16 September 1957, General Sarit Dhanarajata seized power from the government of Marshal Plaek (for additional information on the King's role in the coup, see Bhumibol Adulyadej's role in Thai politics). Sarit abrogated the 1952 constitution, abolished the national assembly, declared martial law, and ruled via a revolutionary council. Sarit and his successors deified the throne and relied on royal sponsorship to legitimize their dictatorship.

A temporary charter was promulgated in February 1959 and remained in place for nine years, even after Sarit's death in 1964. The charter has been called "perhaps the most repressive in Thailand's history." It granted the premier near absolute power, including the authority to order summary executions. It banned political parties and called for an appointed unicameral parliament, consisting of 240 mostly military appointees. It contained only 20 articles, making it the shortest charter in Thai history.

== 1968 constitution ==
General Thanom Kittikachorn succeeded Sarit as dictator of Thailand, ruling amid a rising communist insurgency in Thailand and an escalating US presence in Indochina. The United States provided the Thai government with a billion US dollars in aid, but corruption was rampant. During a trip by King Bhumibol to the US, the American anti-war movement pressured the US government to reduce its support for the regime.

Despite resistance from Thanom, a new constitution was promulgated on 20 June 1968. Although democratic on the surface, the 1968 constitution legitimized Thanom's military-dominated regime. A bicameral parliament was established, with an elected 219-member house and a royally appointed 164-member senate. Contrary to the principles of parliamentary democracy, members of the house were banned from serving in the cabinet. In addition, the senate had the power to delay any legislation for up to a year, and the senate president was the president of parliament. King Bhumibol approved Thanom's entire slate of mostly military senate nominees. The new constitution validated all legislation previously made by the regime, including the sweeping Anticommunist Act used to repress dissent.

In February 1969, the first democratic elections in over a decade were held, resulting in parties aligned with Thanom winning a majority in the house.

== 1972 temporary charter ==
Amid rising social and political conflict, on 17 November 1971, Thanom Kittikachorn and his deputy Praphas Charusathien overthrew their own government, dissolving parliament and the cabinet, declaring martial law, abrogating the constitution, and running the kingdom through a national executive council. Thanom made himself premier, supreme commander, defense, and foreign minister. Praphas made himself deputy premier, interior minister, chief of police, army commander, and head of the Communist Suppression Operations Command. Declaring the coup on television, Thanom opened a letter of approval from the king presented on a gold tray. Along with Narong Kittikachorn (Thanom's son and Praphas's son-in-law), the regime was called that of the "three tyrants."

Massive protests and strikes resulted, coinciding with a recession and high inflation. A disastrous offensive against the Communist Party of Thailand (CPT) was launched. As tensions reached a boiling point in December 1972, Thanom drafted a new charter. Similar in many ways to Sarit's 1959 charter, it reinforced the power of the military dictatorship. Political parties were banned, and a wholly appointed, unicameral, 299-member national legislative assembly, 200 of whom were military and police, was established. The executive retained strong control over the legislature.

== 1974 constitution ==
Thanom's interim charter failed to stem opposition to the "three tyrants". On 13 October 1973, a 400,000-person protest took place at the Democracy Monument. The exact circumstances of 13 and 14 October remain controversial to this day. Late in the afternoon, King Bhumibol summoned Thanom and Praphas to the palace, where they agreed to draft a new constitution within 12 months. Many demonstrators dispersed that evening. The next morning, the police and army began shooting at the remaining demonstrators, killing at least 70. Narong Kittikachorn shot into the crowds from a helicopter. Amid the chaos, Thanom and Praphas resigned from their political appointments, but continued to lead the military. They ordered more troops to confront the remaining demonstrators, but were blocked by Krit Srivara, Army Deputy Commander. Thanom and Narong then resigned from their military positions. The king appointed Sanya Dhammasakdi, dean of the faculty of law and chancellor of Thammasat University, as prime minister by royal command (establishing a precedent exercised three times since for appointment of prime ministers.)

Prime Minister Sanya appointed a constitution-drafting committee consisting of Justice Minister Prakob Hutasing, Kukrit Pramoj, and a number of academics. They produced a first draft by 8 January 1974.

There were concerns that the Thanom-appointed parliament would be inappropriate for approving the draft. The king suggested a royally appointed 2,347-person group, who would appoint a 299-person committee, who would nominate a 100-person convention to scrutinize the draft.

The first draft of the drafting committee swung the balance of power to an elected legislature for the first time since 1946. Political parties would once again be legalized. A hybrid between single-member and multiple-member constituencies was created: constituencies were once again province-wide with one MP for a population of 150,000, but a province with over three MPs was to be divided into two or more constituencies, each with at least one, but not more than three, MPs. This prevented populous provinces from dominating the legislature.

The draft allowed the elected house to appoint the senate. A simple majority could override the royal veto. Cabinet members had to be MPs. In an unprecedented move, the drafters required a popular referendum on the draft prior to the king's approval.

The draft faced staunch opposition by royalist members of the convention, led by Kasem Chatikavanich. A new draft was demanded, granting the monarch greater power and increasing royal powers to the level granted by the 1949 constitution. The monarch would appoint a Senate with the countersign of the privy council president. The royal veto could be overridden only with a two-thirds majority of the combined parliament. Furthermore, the Senate could kill any laws by not voting on them for six months. Civil servants and soldiers could not become MPs, but could form up to half of the cabinet. The new draft would not require approval by a public referendum.

The palace added two clauses. First, in the absence of a prince, parliament could select a princess as successor to the throne. The 1924 Palace Law on Succession banned female monarchs. Second, the Palace Law could be amended. Previous constitutions declared the law immutable.

The new draft was very different from the intentions of the drafting committee, and at one point, Sanya actually resigned from the premiership, only to be pressured back into position. The new draft was approved by the convention and promulgated on 7 October 1974. The majority of the constitution conformed to the convention's alternative draft. However, the premier, rather than the privy council president, was allowed to countersign the royal declaration appointing senators. Legislative elections were held in January 1975, resulting in none of the 22 parties coming close to winning a majority. The Democrats, led by Seni Pramoj, formed a coalition government in February 1974. The coalition was highly unstable, and was replaced in less than a month by a Social Action Party-led coalition which appointed Kukrit Pramoj as premier.

== 1976 constitution ==
Kukrit's coalition government was highly controversial, and governed amid escalating anti-leftist violence. Kukrit's own house was attacked and ransacked by police in August 1975. The palace was increasingly involved in the political maelstrom, and in January 1976, the military successfully demanded that Kukrit dissolve parliament. Elections were scheduled on 14 April. The months leading up to the election were extremely violent. Seni Pramoj's Democrats won the most seats in the election, and formed a shaky coalition government.

Seni's government came under great pressure. A bill to extend elections to local levels was passed by parliament 149–19, but the king refused to sign the bill or return it to parliament, effectively vetoing it. As anti-leftist hysteria escalated, Praphas Charusathien returned shortly from exile to meet the king. Protesting students were attacked by Red Gaur paramilitary units. On 19 September 1976, Thanom returned and was immediately ordained as a monk at Wat Bovornives. Massive protests erupted. The king and queen returned from a trip to the south to visit monk Thanom, leading Seni to resign from the premiership in protest. His resignation was refused by parliament, but initial attempts to reshuffle his cabinet were blocked by the king. The political tension finally exploded on 6 October 1976, when Village Scouts and Red Gaur joined with military and police to rape and massacre at least 46 students protesting at Thammasat University. That evening, the military seized power and installed hard-line royalist Thanin Kraivichien as premier.

The military coup was clearly endorsed by the king, who declared that it was "a manifestation of what the people clearly wanted."

The new constitution, promulgated in 1976, gave the premier near absolute powers, including the power of summary justice. Political parties were banned. The king was allowed to appoint a 360-member unicameral national assembly of bureaucrats and soldiers. In addition, the king was granted a new prerogative, the power to introduce his own legislation directly into the assembly.

Thanin made criminal cases the jurisdiction of military tribunals and gave police sweeping powers to detain people without charges for up to six months. The penalty for lèse majesté was toughened and the law's scope was expanded. Dozens of people were charged. All protests were banned (although royal rallies were allowed), the media was strictly censored, and the police scoured homes and schools to confiscate blacklisted books. The communist insurgency escalated to nearly a full-scale war.

Symbolically, Thanin planned to renovate the Democracy Monument. The monument, built to commemorate the constitution and the overthrow of the absolute monarchy, consisted of a gold-painted constitution atop giant offering bowls, in the center of the historic section of Bangkok. Thanin wanted to replace the constitution with a huge statue of King Prajadhipok. Engineering challenges prevented this, so he instead placed the statue in front of parliament. As for the Democracy Monument, the government planned to demolish it.

== 1977 charter ==
Thanin's dictatorship provoked harsh opposition, even from the military, whose slate of legislative appointees was largely rejected by Thanin. On 20 October 1977, the military, led by Kriangsak Chamanan, overthrew Thanin's government. The king's opposition to this can be seen from his immediate appointment of Thanin to his privy council. However, he did consent to signing the military's draft charter.

The 1977 charter was virtually the same as the 1976 constitution. The only key difference was that the name of the junta was changed to the National Policy Council.

The new regime pledged a permanent constitution and elections in 1979. The National Policy Council appointed only three of its members to the cabinet. Relations with communist China, Laos, and Vietnam were improved. This foreign policy, as well as conciliatory government policies, weakened the Communist Party of Thailand and greatly reduced domestic political tensions.

Kriangsak's government continued to be snubbed by the king. Deposed Premier Thanin was appointed to the king's privy council. Amnesty to protesters and students tried by the Thanin regime was denied for years.

== 1978 constitution ==
Kriangsak drafted a more democratic constitution in 1978. The constitution established a bicameral national assembly, consisting of an elected 301-member house of representatives and an appointed 225-member senate. The premier, not the king, appointed the senate. The house could submit a motion for parliamentary debate for a vote of no-confidence. However, the senate could block house legislation concerning national security, the economy, the budget, and votes of no confidence. Most significantly, the constitution created a transitory period, to end on 21 April 1983, after which military and civil servants would be banned from appointment to the premiership and cabinet.

House elections, for which political parties were banned, were held in April 1979, resulting in a coalition government which continued to appoint Kriangsak as premier. The oil crisis later caused rampant inflation, leading to Kriangsak's resignation (without a dissolution of parliament) in February 1980. A coalition government was formed that appointed Kriangsak's defense minister, Army Commander Prem Tinsulanonda as premier.

Prem ruled for another eight years, never once running in an election. He retained power despite several military coups with strong palace support. Prem legalized political parties.

In early 1983, facing the end of the constitutional transitory period on 21 April, after which he would be banned from appointment to the premiership, Prem planned to amend the constitution to make the transitory period permanent. Prem's aid, Pichit Kullavanich, hinted at a military coup if the amendment was not ratified. The amendment faced harsh public opposition while the military itself was distracted by internal conflicts leading to the failure of the amendment its 3rd reading on 16 March 1983.

On 19 March 1983, Prem dissolved parliament and scheduled house elections on 18 April. The new government would thus be formed under the transitory clauses, allowing Prem to continue as premier for up to four more years. Prem's plan was successful and allowed him to consolidate his power base. Prem noted that "The armed forces will play an important role in the defense of the country, national independence, and the democratic system under the monarchy."

Parliament revolted again in 1986, prompting Prem to dissolve parliament and schedule house elections on 27 July. The Democrats campaigned against Prem's domination and managed to win the most seats. But the government coalition they formed still reappointed Prem as premier. Later, Prem was accused of using the king's name and the military's strength as the means to retain power.

Parliament was dissolved and house elections scheduled for 24 July 1988, with Prem again not standing for election. As in 1986, the election resulted in no single party winning enough seats to govern without a coalition. Thousands protested in front of Prem's house against the prospect of an unelected premier, until Prem finally announced that he would not accept the premiership. The Chart Thai party, led by General Chatichai Choonhavan, won the most seats in the election, and Chatichai became the new premier.

== 1991 constitutions ==
On 23 February 1991, Army Commander Suchinda Kraprayoon led the military in seizing power from the Chatichai government, abrogating the 1978 constitution, and replacing it with a temporary charter. Calling themselves the National Peace Keeping Council (NPKC), the coup makers appointed a new unicameral national assembly of 292 military officers and supporters, headed by Ukrit Mongkolnavin. Ukrit and appointed Premier Anand Panyarachun were tasked with drafting a permanent constitution.

The drafting of a new constitution became a virtual battleground between the military and its opponents. The military favored a position of continued strength, a larger and more powerful NPKC-appointed senate with power over an elected house, a larger privy council, and the ability for non-elected officials to become cabinet members. This last clause allowed an acting military leader to become premier. The public mobilized to protest the draft, with 50,000 people demonstrating at Sanam Luang on 19 November 1991, the largest protest in Thailand since 1976. The king intervened in his 4 December birthday speech, urging the public to accept the draft and noting that "procedures or principles that we have imported for use are sometimes not suitable to the conditions of Thailand or the character of Thai people." The constitution allowed Suchinda Kraprayoon to be appointed as prime minister, which led to a violent public uprising in May 1992 that brought down the government.

== 1997 constitution ==
The 1997 constitution was widely hailed as a landmark in democratic political reform. Promulgated on 11 October 1997, it was the first constitution to be drafted by an elected assembly, and hence was popularly called the "people's constitution".

=== The constitution drafting process ===
The "Black May" public uprising against the NPKC-dominated government that arose due to the 1991 constitution provoked public calls for a more accountable system of government. In June 1994, the Prawase Wasi-led House Committee for Democracy Development amended the 1991 constitution, but was unable to push through significant reform. After the collapse of the Chuan government, the 1995-1996 government of Banharn Silpa-archa amended the 1991 constitution again on 22 October 1996.

The 1996 amendment called for the creation of an entirely new constitution by a 99-member Constitution Drafting Assembly (CDA). Seventy-six members would be directly elected from each province and 23 members would be selected by parliament. Anand Panyarachun, PM in 1991 under the military regime, was elected as a member of the CDA and appointed Chairman of the Drafting Committee. Political scientists and jurists Chai-Anan Samudavanija, Amorn Chantarasomboon, Uthai Pimchaichon, and Borwornsak Uwanno played key roles in the assembly. Public consultation took place on a nationwide basis. Some clauses, particularly the requirement that all MPs hold bachelor's degrees, the constitutional court, and decentralisation provoked strong criticism. The Asian Economic Crisis of 1997 has been cited as a major impetus for the constitution's successful approval.

=== Key features ===
The 1997 constitution had several innovations compared to previous constitutions, including:

- Election reform. Voting was made compulsory in order to ensure high turnout to reduce vote buying. A mixed electoral system based on Germany's was adopted for the House of Representatives. One hundred members of the house are elected from party lists, and the remaining 400 are elected from single-member constituencies. MPs were required to have a bachelor's degree. An independent election commission was established.
- Strengthening the executive branch. A two-fifths vote of the house was required for a vote of no confidence debate against a prime minister. A successful vote of no confidence required a majority of one-half of the house. Only one-fifth of the house was required for a no confidence motion against an individual minister. These measures were aimed at increasing the stability of governments.
- Greater separation between the executive and legislative branches. MPs were forced to resign from the house in order to become cabinet ministers.
- Human rights. A number of human rights were explicitly recognized, including the right to free education, the rights of traditional communities, and the right and duty to peacefully protest coups and other extra-constitutional means of acquiring power. The right to protest coups was banned following the 2006 coup.
- Decentralization of government, including the establishment of elected Tambon Administrative Organizations (TAOs) and Provincial Administrative Organizations (PAOs). School administration was also decentralized.
- Increased checks and balances, including new independent government agencies like the Constitutional Court, the Administrative Court, the Office of the Auditor-General, the National Counter Corruption Commission, the National Human Rights Commission, the Consumer's Protection Organization, the Environmental Conservation Organization, and an Ombudsman.

=== Praise and criticism ===
The constitution was highly praised for the inclusive process involved in its drafting, its enshrinement of human rights, and its significant advances in political reform. It was viewed as successful in fostering democratic development and increasing political stability. Its measures to politically empower and protect citizens were also praised. The January 2001 house election, the first house election contested under the 1997 constitution, was called the most open, corruption-free election in Thai history. Political parties were effectively strengthened, and the effective number of parties in the legislature fell.

Most criticism was based on the perspective that the constitution was too effective in some of its reforms. One of the members of the drafting committee, Amorn Chantarasomboon, claimed that an overly strong and stable government brought on a "tyranny of the majority" and a "parliamentary dictatorship." Following House elections in April 2006, the Election Commissioners were jailed and the election results overturned by the Constitutional Court.

The constitution was also criticized for the lack of clarity with which it defines the king's role in politics (see Royal powers and 2006 demand for royal intervention). The Senate's role in scrutinizing Constitutional Court appointments came under much criticism (see Appointment of the first Constitutional Court). Although the Senate was supposed to be non-partisan, bloc voting became common. A constitutional crisis almost occurred following April 2006 House elections (see April 2006 House election results). Governments were criticized for politicizing appointments to independent agencies.

== 2006 interim constitution ==
=== 2006 coup d'état ===
On the evening of 19 September 2006, less than a month before scheduled nationwide house elections, the Thai military staged a coup against the government of Thaksin Shinawatra. The military junta abrogated the 1997 constitution, suspended the parliament, banned demonstrations and political activities, censored the media, and dissolved the constitutional court, National Human Rights Commission and other agencies created by the 1997 constitution. For the first weeks, the junta ruled by decree.

International condemnation and several local protests against the coup were conducted, despite the junta's ban. In subsequent weeks, condemnation of the coup transformed into criticism of the junta-appointed government of General Surayud Chulanont and the constitution drafting process.

=== The drafting process ===
The junta appointed a legal panel to draft an interim charter (later officially called a "constitution"). The team was led by former senate speaker Meechai Ruchuphan, and originally included jurists Borwornsak Uwanno and Wissanu Krea-ngam. Both had played key roles in drafting the 1997 constitution and had served under the deposed government, although they had resigned several months before the coup. Both resigned from the panel after public criticism that they were members of the ancien régime. Thammasat University vice-rector Prinya Thewanaruemitkul harshly criticized the two, saying that they were "not honourable enough to look after the democratic system." Both refused to play any further role with the military junta.

=== Key features and criticism ===
A draft of the interim charter was released on 27 September 2006, to much criticism. The draft interim charter allowed the junta, which would be transformed into a permanent Council for National Security (CNS), to appoint an extremely powerful executive branch. The junta would also appoint a 250-member unicameral legislature. Other major concerns included:

- The lack of controls for the drafting of a permanent constitution. The CNS would appoint a 2,000-member National People's Assembly which would select 200 of its members to be candidates for the Constitution Drafting Assembly. The CNS would select 100 of those candidates for royal appointment to the assembly. It would also select the assembly head. The assembly would then appoint 25 of its members as constitution writers, with the CNS directly appointing 10 writers. This process effectively gave the junta complete control over the drafting of the permanent constitution.
- The use of an old charter if the permanent constitution was not completed by a CNS-set deadline. The specific charter to revert to was not specified. The CNS and the cabinet would choose which of Thailand's 16 previous charters to use.
- The lack of a clear timeline for a permanent constitution.
- The inclusion of King Bhumibol's theory of a self-sufficient economy in the preamble.
- The granting of legal authority for the junta's post-coup announcements and orders, including bans against demonstrations and political activities (Article 36).
- The granting of amnesty to the junta for staging the coup (Article 37).
- The inability of the public to file comments on parliamentary bills.

The draft's content as well as drafting process met with much public criticism. However, the interim charter did call for one democratic innovation: it required that a permanent constitution would have to be ratified by public referendum. Nonetheless, the referendum proposal too was condemned, as the junta would have complete authority to propose a permanent alternative constitution if the draft were to be rejected.

The draft interim charter was promulgated unchanged on 1 October 2006.

== 2007 constitution ==
The 2006 interim constitution specified the terms and conditions for the drafting of a permanent constitution. The drafting committee consisted of drafters both directly and indirectly appointed by the CNS junta. The draft was subject to a public referendum, but under the terms of the 2006 constitution, the CNS would be allowed to promulgate any constitution of their choosing if the draft failed the referendum. The draft was criticized by the Thai Rak Thai party and supported by the Democrat party. Criticism of the draft was banned. The CNS attempted to link loyalty to the king with support for the draft, and ran a campaign with the slogan "Love the King. Care about the King. Vote in a referendum. Accept the 2007 draft charter." The draft was approved by 59.3 percent of the voters on 19 August 2007, with 55.6 percent of qualified voters voting.

Under the 2007 constitution, only half of the senate was elected; the other half was appointed. The executive branch was weakened, and half as many MPs were needed to propose a no-confidence vote compared to the 1997 constitution. The judiciary was strengthened and high-ranking judges became part of the appointment committees for the senate, the election commission, and virtually all other independent agencies, causing critics to label The 2007 constitution as "the absolute rule of judges."

== 2014 suspension of 2007 constitution ==
On 20 May 2014, in what was described as a partial repeal of the 2007 constitution, Prayut Chan-o-cha, the Commander in Chief of the Royal Thai Army, invoked the act proclaimed 27 August 2457 B.E. (1914 CE) as part of the administrative reforms of King Vajiravudh (Rama VI) entitled Martial Law, B.E. 2457 (1914) (as amended in 1942, 1944, 1959, and 1972). Gen. Prayut declared martial law and nighttime curfew nationwide, dissolved the government and the Senate of Thailand, invested the executive and legislative powers in the National Council for Peace and Order (NCPO) with himself its leader, and ordered the judicial branch to operate under its directives.

On 29 May, Gen Prayut directly addressed public television audiences to announce plans for administering the country, emphasizing financial stability and transparency. He explained that because peace and reforms must first be achieved, national elections might not take place for more than a year, with no timetable for reinstating a codified constitution.

== 2017 constitution ==
The National Council for Peace and Order (NCPO) unveiled a draft constitution on 29 March 2016. In the run-up to the 7 August 2016 referendum on the new constitution, the army conducted a "grassroots information campaign." There was no debate permitted on its merits. Under the junta's rules, "people who propagate information deemed distorted, violent, aggressive, inciting or threatening so that voters do not vote or vote in a particular way" faced up to 10 years in jail and a fine of up to 200,000 baht. The 105-page, 279-article constitution was approved by 61.4 percent of Thai voters on 7 August 2016 with 59.4 percent of the public participating.

Under the constitution, Parliament is bicameral, consisting of a 250-member nominated Senate and a 500-member House of Representatives of whom 350 are elected from single-member constituencies and 150 members from party lists. The proposed constitution also allows the NCPO to appoint an eight to ten person panel who will choose Senators, to include six seats reserved for the heads of the Royal Thai Army, Navy, Air Force, and Police, plus the military's supreme commander, and defense permanent secretary. A sitting of both houses of the bicameral Parliament became required to name a prime minister, and that meeting could also select a candidate as Prime Minister who is not one of its members or even a politician. A candidate must receive a majority in a joint session of both houses of parliament to become Prime Minister. Some suspected that with the new constitution the military sought to hobble political parties in order to create disposable coalition governments. The military would then remain the real power, whatever the outcome of the referendum and the election. The process for amending the constitution was also made more complex and difficult, effectively allowing the military to entrench its power via the Senate.

Six changes were made to the voter approved constitution by the time it was ratified on 6 April 2017. These changes give the Thai monarch great power on the appointment of Regents, require disclosure of Regents by the Privy Council in order to obtain approval from the Thai Parliament, and also restores the 2007 Constitution's requirement that the monarch has personal management of any constitutional crisis. Additionally, the constitutional change expanded the right to a healthy environment.

== See also ==
- Law of Thailand
- Politics of Thailand
- Human rights in Thailand
- History of Thailand (1932–1973)
- History of Thailand (1973–2001)
- History of Thailand since 2001
