= 1997 constitution of Thailand =

Fundamental law of Thailand from 1997 to 2006; landmark of Thai democratic reform

Parliament vote on the 1997 Constitution of Thailand, 27 September 1997 Agree 578 Disagree 16 Abstention 17

The Constitution of the Kingdom of Thailand, Buddhist Era 2540 (1997) (Thai: รัฐธรรมนูญแห่งราชอาณาจักรไทย พุทธศักราช ๒๕๔๐, RTGS: Ratthathammanun Haeng Ratcha-anachak Thai Phutthasakkarat Song Phan Ha Roi Si Sip) was a constitution of Thailand enacted on 11 October 1997 to replace the 1991 Constitution, and was widely hailed as a landmark in Thai democratic constitutional reform, it represented the most democratic constitution in the nation's history. The Constituent assembly was elected by the National Assembly on 26 December 1996, shortly after 1996 Thai general election.

The 1997 constitution was the first constitution to be drafted by a popularly elected Constitutional Drafting Assembly, hence was popularly called the "People's Constitution". The 1997 constitution created a bicameral legislature. For the first time in Thai history, both houses were directly elected. Many human rights are explicitly acknowledged in the text, and measures were established to increase the stability of elected governments.

The Constitution was repealed by the Council for Democratic Reform on 19 September 2006 following a successful military coup d'état, and was replaced by the junta-imposed interim Constitution on 1 October 2006.

== Constitution drafting process ==
The "Black May" public uprising against a military-dominated government that gained power due to the 1991 Constitution provoked public calls for a more accountable system of government. In June 1994, the Committee of Democracy Development of the House of Representatives was established during the government of Chuan Leekpai. Chuan was forced to establish the Committee following a hunger strike by prominent activist Chalard Vorachat. The Committee, headed by academic Prawase Wasi, amended the 1991 Constitution but was unable to push through further reform. However, it did identify many basic frameworks which would become influential for subsequent political change. After the collapse of the Chuan government, the 1995-1996 government of Banharn Silpa-archa established a Political Reform Committee which amended the Constitution again on 22 October 1996. Efforts to adopt a new constitution gained increasing public support. On 2 November 1995, noted royalist and social critic Dr. Prawase Wasi declared to a crowded Bangkok ballroom that Thailand urgently needed a new constitution, to help avert the potential calamity of political violence that might follow the death of King Bhumibol Adulyadej. None of the media outlets in the room dared report this highly sensitive speech.

The 1996 amendment called for the creation of an entirely new constitution by a special committee outside the National Assembly. The Constitution Drafting Assembly (CDA) was formed with 99 members: seventy-six of them directly elected from each of the provinces and 23 qualified persons short-listed by the Parliament from academia and other sources. Anand Panyarachun, Premier in 1991 under the military regime, was selected as a member of the CDA and appointed Chairman of the Drafting Committee. Political scientists and jurists Chai-Anan Samudavanija, Amorn Chantarasomboon, Uthai Pimchaichon, and Borwornsak Uwanno were key influencers of the draft. A process of public consultation took place on a nationwide basis. Some clauses, particularly the requirement that all MP's hold bachelor's degrees, the party list system, the Constitutional Court, and decentralisation provoked strong criticism, particularly from smaller parties. The Asian Economic Crisis of 1997 increased public awareness about the need for reform, and has been cited as an impetus for the constitution's successful approval. The draft was approved by the National Assembly with 518 votes for, 16 against, and 17 abstentions. A referendum, called for if the draft was rejected by the National Assembly, was not necessary.

== Overview of sections ==
The 1997 constitution had 12 Chapters and a section of Transitory Provisions, containing a total of 317 Sections.

- Chapter 1 (Sections 1-7): General provisions, the source and exercise sovereign power, the fundamental rights of the Thai people, and the status of the Constitution.
- Chapter 2 (Sections 8-25): The status, prerogative, rights of the King, the Privy Council, as well as matters of succession to the throne.
- Chapter 3 (Sections 26-65): The rights and liberties of the Thai people.
- Chapter 4 (Sections 66-70): The duties of the Thai people.
- Chapter 5 (Sections 71-89): The fundamental responsibilities of the state.
- Chapter 6 (Sections 90-200): The structure, roles, and responsibilities of the National Assembly (i.e., Parliament), including the House of Representatives, the Senate, elections and the Election Commission, the Ombudsmen, and the National Human Rights Commission.
- Chapter 7 (Sections 201-232): The Council of Ministers (i.e., the Cabinet) and the workings of the executive branch.
- Chapter 8 (Sections 233-281): The workings of the Courts of Justice, the Constitutional Court, the Administrative Courts, and the Military Courts.
- Chapter 9 (Sections 282-290): The workings of local governments
- Chapter 10 (Sections 291-311): Inspection and proceedings against members of the government, including the declaration of accounts and assets, the National Counter Corruption Commission, and impeachment of and criminal proceedings against government and political officials.
- Chapter 11 (Section 312): The roles and responsibilities of the State Audit Commission and the Auditor-General.
- Chapter 12 (Section 313): Regulations concerning amendment of the Constitution.
- Transitory Provisions (Sections 314-317): Regulations concerning the transfer of power from the last government of the 1991 Constitution.

== Key features ==
=== Innovations ===
Compared to previous Thai constitutions, The 1997 constitution had contained several innovations in key areas, including:

- Election reform. Voting was made compulsory in order to ensure a high turnout and make vote buying so expensive as to be unfeasible. An Additional Member System, based on that used in Germany, was adopted for the House of Representatives. 100 members of the House are elected by proportional rule from party lists using the d'Hondt method, and the remaining 400 are elected by first-past-the-post from single-member constituencies. The proportional representation party list system was aimed at deterring vote-buying, strengthening the party system, and increasing the quality of candidates. MPs were required to have a bachelor's degree. In order to prevent last-minute party-switching, MPs were required to be registered members of political parties at least 90 days before the election date. An independent Election Commission was established. Votes for House elections were counted at a central site in each province rather than at each polling station. This reform made it more difficult for village canvassers to evaluate the effectiveness of vote buying.
- Strengthening the executive branch. A two-fifths vote of the House was required for a vote of no confidence debate to be initiated against a Prime Minister. The motion must also contain the name of an alternative Premier to replace the incumbent. A successful vote of no confidence required a majority of at least half of the House. A similar process could initiate a no-confidence motion against an individual Minister; this required only one-fifth of the signatures of the House members. These measures were aimed at increasing the stability of governments.
- Legislative reform. For the first time in Thai history, the upper house of Parliament was directly elected. The 200-member body was non-partisan, and Senators were prohibited from being members of a political party. In addition, Senate elections campaigns were strictly limited in what information they could communicate to voters. Senators were elected to a term of six years. The Senate could only amend or approve a piece of legislation, not propose it. A vote of two-thirds of both houses was needed to override a royal veto. The Senate could not be dissolved by the Premier.
- Greater separation between the executive and legislative branches. MPs were forced to resign from the House in order to become Cabinet Ministers, unlike previous constitutions. Based on the principle of "individual ministerial responsibility and cabinet collective responsibility", this forced Ministers who had been successfully censured to become normal citizens rather than MPs. It also encouraged parties to put potential ministers on the party list rather than a particular constituency.
- Human rights. A myriad of human rights were explicitly recognized for the first time, including the rights of children, the elderly, and the handicapped; the right to freedom of information; the right to public health and free education; consumers' rights; the rights of traditional communities; the right to human dignity; and the right to peacefully protest coups and other extra-constitutional means of acquiring power. However, constitutional law expert Prinya Thaewanarumitkul claimed that the right to resist coups, for example by making barricades or blocking roads, would only protect people if the opposition to the coup was successful. In addition, traditional human rights were guaranteed, including freedom of speech, assembly, and association, property rights, freedom of religion, the right to due process of law, the right to be presumed innocent until proven guilty, and equality of rights between men and women. In all, the 1997 constitution guaranteed 40 human rights; in comparison, the 1932 Constitution protected nine.
- Decentralization of government. Elected Tambon Administrative Organizations (TAOs) and Provincial Administrative Organizations (PAOs) were established. School administration was also decentralized, although opposition from teachers has delayed implementation of this reform.
- Increased checks and balances. New independent government agencies were established, like the Constitutional Court, the Administrative Court, the Office of the Auditor-General, the National Anti-Corruption Commission, the National Human Rights Commission, the Consumers' Protection Organization, the Environmental Conservation Organization, and an Ombudsman. Many of these appointments were approved by the Senate. Most of these Constitutional agencies were abolished following the 2006 coup.
- Criminal justice reforms. This included a reduction in police authority to conduct warrantless search, the right to prompt court arraignment within 48 hours of arrest, a more transparent bail procedure, and the right to counsel during police interrogations.

=== Succession ===
Like most preceding constitutions, the 1997 constitution continued to rely on the 1924 Palace Law of Succession with regards to succession. The Palace Law was based on primogeniture, and the heir apparent was Prince Vajiralongkorn. As with most post-1974 constitutions, the Privy Council could appoint a princess as successor to the throne, but only in the absence of an heir apparent. Amendment of the Palace Law of Succession was the sole prerogative of the reigning King. The 1997 Constitution's successor, the 2006 Interim Constitution, was conspicuous in its failure to mention the matter of succession.

== Praise and criticism ==
The Constitution was called a "revolution in Thai politics... A bold attempt at conferring greater power to the Thai people than had ever been granted before." It was highly praised for the participative process involved in its drafting, its enshrinement of human rights, and its significant advances in political reform. It was viewed as successful in fostering democratic development and increasing political stability. Its measures to politically empower and protect citizens were also praised. The new constitution was cited for its role in bringing down the Ministers of Public Health and Agriculture during corruption scandals in the government of Chuan Leekpai. There was also praise for the ease with which the constitution could be amended. Public faith in democracy in general, and in constitutional agencies like the Constitutional Court and the National Anti-Corruption Commission, was very high. However, critics complained that the government had sought to politicize the process of appointments to independent agencies.

The January 2001 House elections, the first House elections contested under the 1997 constitution, were called the most open, corruption-free elections in Thai history. Political parties were effectively strengthened, and the effective number of parties in the legislature fell dramatically from an average of 6.2 before 1997 to 3.1 in 2001. While the number of parties decreased, remaining parties developed clearer and more distinguishable platforms. The Constitution also weakened the legislative influence of civil servants and local power-brokers and businessmen, while strengthening political parties and professional politicians.

Most criticism was based on the view that the Constitution was too effective in some of its reforms. One of the members of the Drafting Committee, Amorn Chantarasomboon, claimed that an overly strong and stable government brought on a "tyranny of the majority" and a "parliamentary dictatorship." Independent agencies like the National Human Rights Commission and the National Anti-Corruption Commission were also criticized as weak and vulnerable to government and court challenges. Following House elections in April 2006, the Election Commissioners were jailed and the election results overturned by the Constitutional Court.

The constitution was also criticized for the lack of clarity with which it defines the King's role in politics (see Royal powers and 2006 demand for royal intervention). The Senate's role in scrutinizing Constitutional Court appointments came under much criticism (see Appointment of the first Constitutional Court). The Senate was criticized for its allegedly partisan behavior, with both pro- and anti- government factions being elected in the Senate elections of 2006. Restrictions on campaigning and political party membership for members of the Senate led one commentator to call it a "motley collection of B-list celebrities and D-list hangers-on." In House elections in April 2006, a constitutional crisis almost occurred when it appeared that the Parliament would not be able to convene within the constitutional time limit (see April 2006 House election results).

Thammasat University law lecturer Kittisak Prokati, a drafter of the post-2006 coup constitution, claimed that "the weakness of the 1997 constitution was that it was a charter without any constitutional or theoretical foundation."

Although constitutional articles (specifically, article 80) committed the state to promote equal rights between men and women, there was little progress in implementing specific laws to promote equality. In practice only around 10% of MPs and senators are female, and less than 6% of ministers. Only 8.9% of district officers and 2.6% of provincial governors are women.

== See also ==
- Constitution of Thailand
- Politics of Thailand
