= Palace Law =

Class of historic Thai legal texts

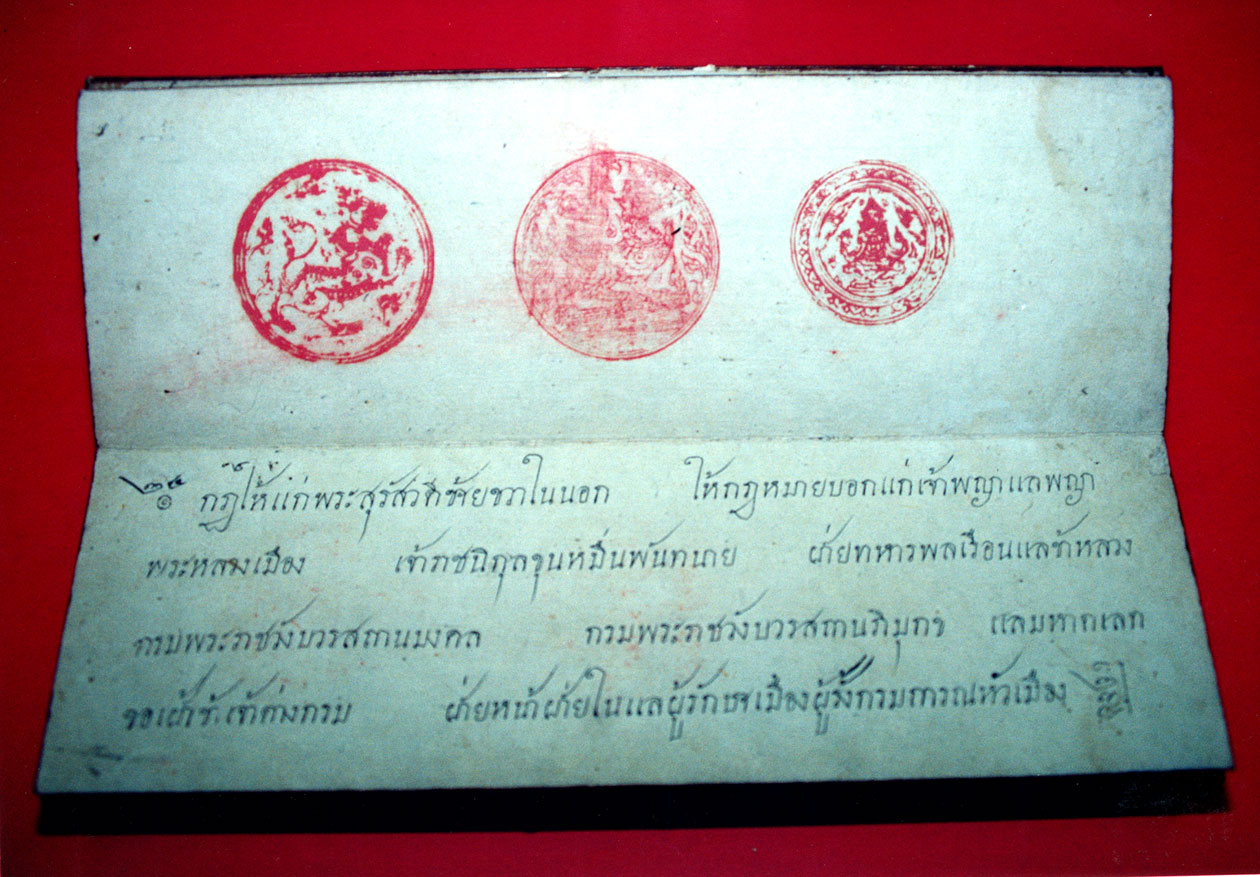
A copy of the Palace Law, displayed at the House of Representatives of Thailand

The Palace Law (Thai: กฎมนเทียรบาล, also spelled กฎมณเฑียรบาล, RTGS: kot monthianban) is a class of legal texts in the history of Thailand, dating from the Ayutthaya period (14th–18th centuries). It prescribed the functions of the monarchy, royal court and government, probably serving as something like a constitution in early Ayutthaya. It was one of the 27 laws compiled in the 1805 Three Seals Code on the orders of King Rama I, following the fall of Ayutthaya.

Today, a handful of palace laws dating from the reign of King Vajiravudh (Rama VI, r. 1910–1925) remain in force, the most significant of which is the 1924 Palace Law of Succession, which is deferred to by the constitution.

== Ayutthaya Palace Law ==
Siroch Sittisombut dates the promulgation of the Ayutthaya law to 1456, in the reign of Borommatrailokkanat, and reads it as an attempt to regulate the succession.

On Baker and Pasuk's translation the law reserved the governorship of a muang luk luang, a princely city, for the son of the principal queen and for the son of the Head Mother. Its three northern principalities are Phitsanulok, Sawankhalok and Kamphaeng Phet. Phitsanulok, reserved for the highest-ranking prince, emerged as the kingdom's second city. Clauses 79, 82, 85 and 86 penalise officials and provincial governors who meet one another privately.
