= 1924 Palace Law of Succession =

Law of Thailand

Palace Law of Succession

Rama VI of Siam
- Long title: Palace Law on Succession, Buddhist Era 2467 (1924)
- Enacted by: Rama VI of Siam
- Enacted: 10 November 1924
- Signed: 10 November 1924
- Commenced: 11 November 1924

Amended by
- Constitution of the Kingdom of Thailand, Buddhist Era 2550 (2007) (Sections 14–23)

Summary
- Succession to the Throne of Thailand; Regency
- Status: In force

The Palace Law of Succession, Buddhist Era 2467 (1924) (Thai: กฎมณเฑียรบาลว่าด้วยการสืบราชสันตติวงศ์ พระพุทธศักราช ๒๔๖๗; RTGS: Kot Monthian Ban Wa Duai Kan Suep Ratchasantatiwong Phra Phutthasakkarat Song Phan Si Roi Hok Sip Chet) governs succession to the Throne of the Kingdom of Thailand, under the ruling House of Chakri. Succession matters prior to the end of absolute monarchy in 1932 could be contentious, especially during the Ayutthaya period from the 14th to 18th centuries. In 1924, King Vajiravudh (Rama VI) attempted to clarify the succession process by laying down the Palace Law of Succession. It was promulgated and came into effect in November 1924 as, in part, an attempt to eliminate the vagueness relating to succession within the Thai monarchical regime and to systematically resolve previous controversies. In 1932, after Siam became a constitutional monarchy, various amendments relating to succession were introduced. The 1997 Constitution of Thailand relied on the law with regard to succession, but the 2006 Interim Constitution made no mention of succession, leaving it to "constitutional practice". The 2007 Constitution again relied on the Palace Law. The preamble of the 2014 interim constitution of Thailand abrogated the 2007 Constitution, with the exception of chapter 2, concerning the monarchy and the succession.

== Background ==
The original Palace Law of A.D. 1360 relating to succession since Ayutthaya Kingdom period (1351–1767) did not lay out a clear system for determining a successor upon the death of a king. Rather, it provided a frame of reference from which the next king could be chosen. Typically, the new king would be either the late king's son born of a major queen or consort (Thai: หน่อพระพุทธเจ้า; RTGS: no phra phuttha chao), or one of his brothers. The Law also provided rules by which someone who was neither a son nor a brother of the deceased king could accede to the throne, should the situation or circumstances require it.

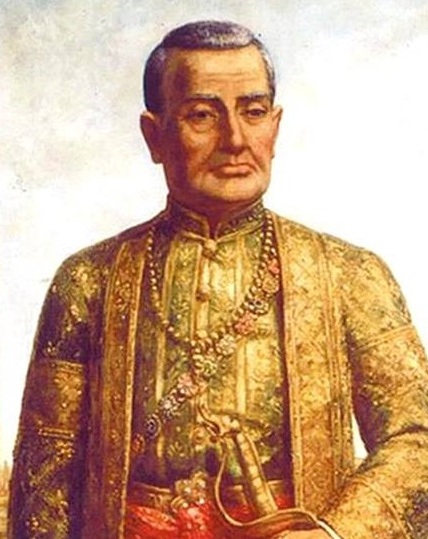
Phutthayotfa Chulalok

However, the Palace Law was not always followed and did not ensure smooth successions. At least one third of Ayutthaya's royal successions involved bloodshed. Indeed, the history of the kingdom at that time is a chronicle of frequent usurpations and of ambitious men thwarting the final wishes of recently departed kings. Historian David K. Wyatt observed that "virtually all successions to the throne of Ayutthaya in the seventeenth and eighteenth centuries were, at the least, irregular, and in many cases either disguised or real usurpations."

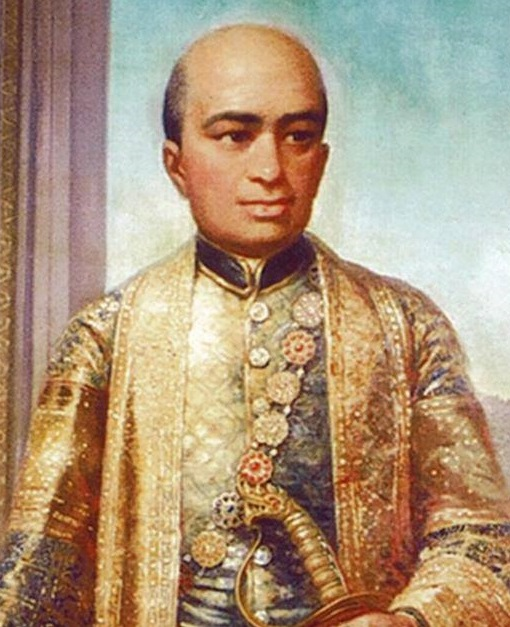
Phutthayotfa Naphalai

King Taksin (reigned 1767–1782) established himself as King of Siam by right of conquest. He, however, alienated the ecclesiastical support to secure the legitimacy of his reign, and was overthrown in a palace coup. His chief military commander, then on an expedition to enforce recognition of his friend and king by the current ruler of Cambodia, hastened to the rescue. When apprised of the full seriousness of situation, however, he concurred in the overthrow and founded the Royal House of Chakri as King Phutthayotfa Chulalok (later styled Rama I, reigned 1782–1809). He next established the office of the Supreme Patriarch of Thailand. Then, following the precedent of the newly crowned King Wareru of the 13th century, the newly crowned king of Siam commissioned scholars to collect and revise laws from the Ayutthaya era. The Code of Wareru is reflected in successive codes, but the Siamese went beyond it to establish a true code of laws. The Palace Law was a constituent part of this new legal compendium called The Three Seals Code, which was needed, Rama I said, because old laws were often misinterpreted and this led to injustice. Succession under the Three Seals Code took into account the potential of the next king to be, as prescribed by ancient Buddhist texts, a dhammaraja (righteous king). This was manifested in his upholding of the Ten Virtues of Kingship. Lineage, however, still played a very important role.

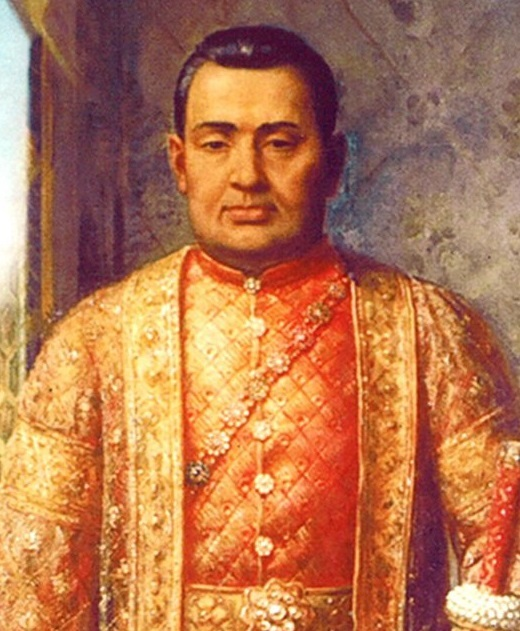
Nangklao

All of the transfers of power in the Royal House of Chakri that followed the introduction of the Three Seals Code were accomplished with almost no bloodshed – although they were not without some complications. In part, greater adherence to the idea that the wisest and most capable possible successor should be chosen has tempered the eight successions of the Royal House of Chakri during the Rattanakosin (Bangkok) era. At a special council of senior members of royalty and officials, it was agreed that King Phutthayotfa Naphalai or Rama II (reigned 1809–1824) should succeed his father. After the death of Rama II in 1824, a grand assembly of the royal family, high officers of state and members of the Buddhist monkhood led by the supreme patriarch was convened. The assembly chose a son born of Rama II and a royal consort, a prince who had a proven record, over the king's much younger and less experienced half-brother, Prince Mongkut, who had recently been ordained as a monk. Although as the son of a full queen, Prince Mongkut might have had a superior claim to the throne in terms of lineage, he remained in the temple. This averted a potential succession crisis and any conflict with King Nangklao or Rama III (reigned 1824–1851).

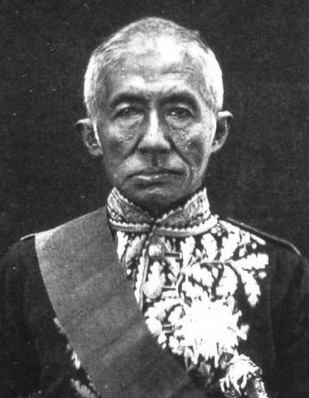
Mongkut

The nuances of all this were beyond the understanding of many European observers raised in the presumably less complicated tradition of primogeniture, in which the oldest male heir always succeeds by right of lineage. In the eyes of some Westerners, it appeared that new king had usurped the throne. Later, Rama III's own succession nearly became a crisis. As his health continued to deteriorate in 1851 following months of fruitless discussions about possible successors, the heir to the throne remained unnamed. A foreign observer of the time recounted that: "All parties concerning the question of the succession were preparing themselves with arms and troops for self-defence and resistance." Before they could come to blows, "there was convened at the king's palace ... a meeting of all the princes, nobles, and chief rulers of the land to confer on the all engrossing question of who shall become the successor to the present king."

One of the possible successors to the throne was Prince Mongkut again. Over the 27 years of Rama III's reign, the royal monk had become the leader of a Buddhist reform order. When considering his heir, Rama III had reportedly expressed reservations about the princes who might succeed him. If Prince Mongkut became king, Rama III feared he might order the Sangha (community of monks) to dress in the style of the [Buddhist] Mons. To assuage such doubts, Prince Mongkut wrote a letter to the assembly to make his own case for succeeding to the throne. He also ordered monks in his order to discontinue any practices considered unorthodox or foreign.

According to historian David K. Wyatt, who cites an account given by Prince Mongkut to American missionary Dan Beach Bradley about two weeks before Rama III died, the assembly resolved to protect the claims to the throne of Prince Mongkut and his talented younger brother, Prince Chudamani. As it came to pass, when Rama III passes away, Prince Mongkut becomes king Rama IV, reigned 1851–1868, and Prince Chudamani was elevated to the office and residence of Front Palace as Phra Pinklao (or Pin Klao) with equal honor to the King (as was the case with Naresuan and Ekatotsarot.) In English, the office is called " Uparaja, "Vice King" or "Second King", with Mongkut preferring the latter. In the Chakri dynasty, there were three previous holders of the office – Isarasundhorn, Maha Senanurak and Maha Sakdi Polsep. The first was the only Chakri Front Palace to succeed as king, as Rama II.

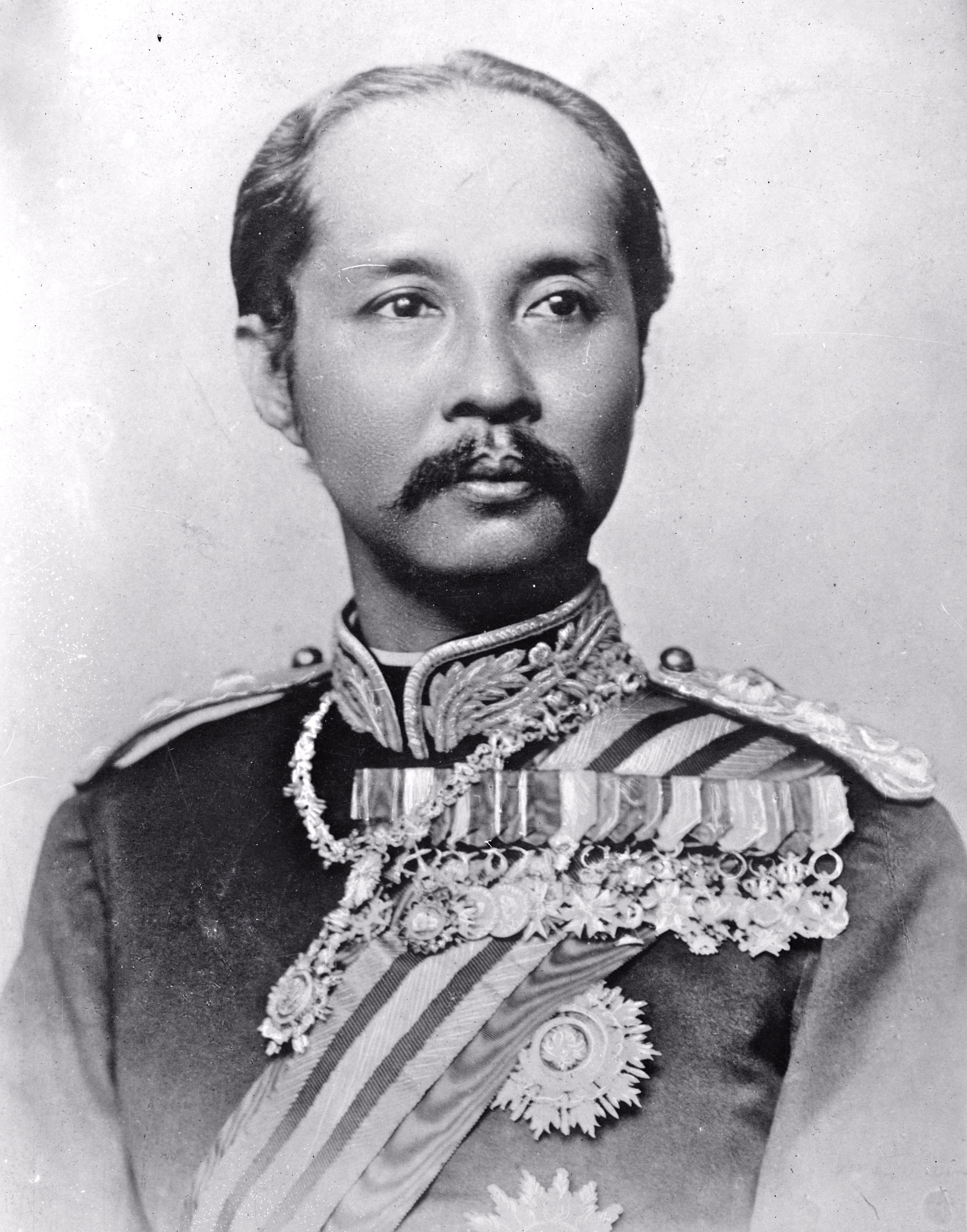
Chulalongkorn

King Mongkut left the position of second king open after Phra Pinklao died in 1865. If King Mongkut had named a replacement second king, the throne could have passed to that person rather than one of his sons. When King Mongkut died in 1868, the Great Council was assembled again. It selected 15-year-old Prince Chulalongkorn, the oldest son of King Mongkut, and Chao Phraya Sri Suriyawongse, a leading member of the powerful Bunnag family, was appointed regent. The council also named the son of the former second king, Prince Yodyingyot (1838–1885, later known as Prince Bovorn Vichaichan), as the uparat (ancient title for "vice king.")

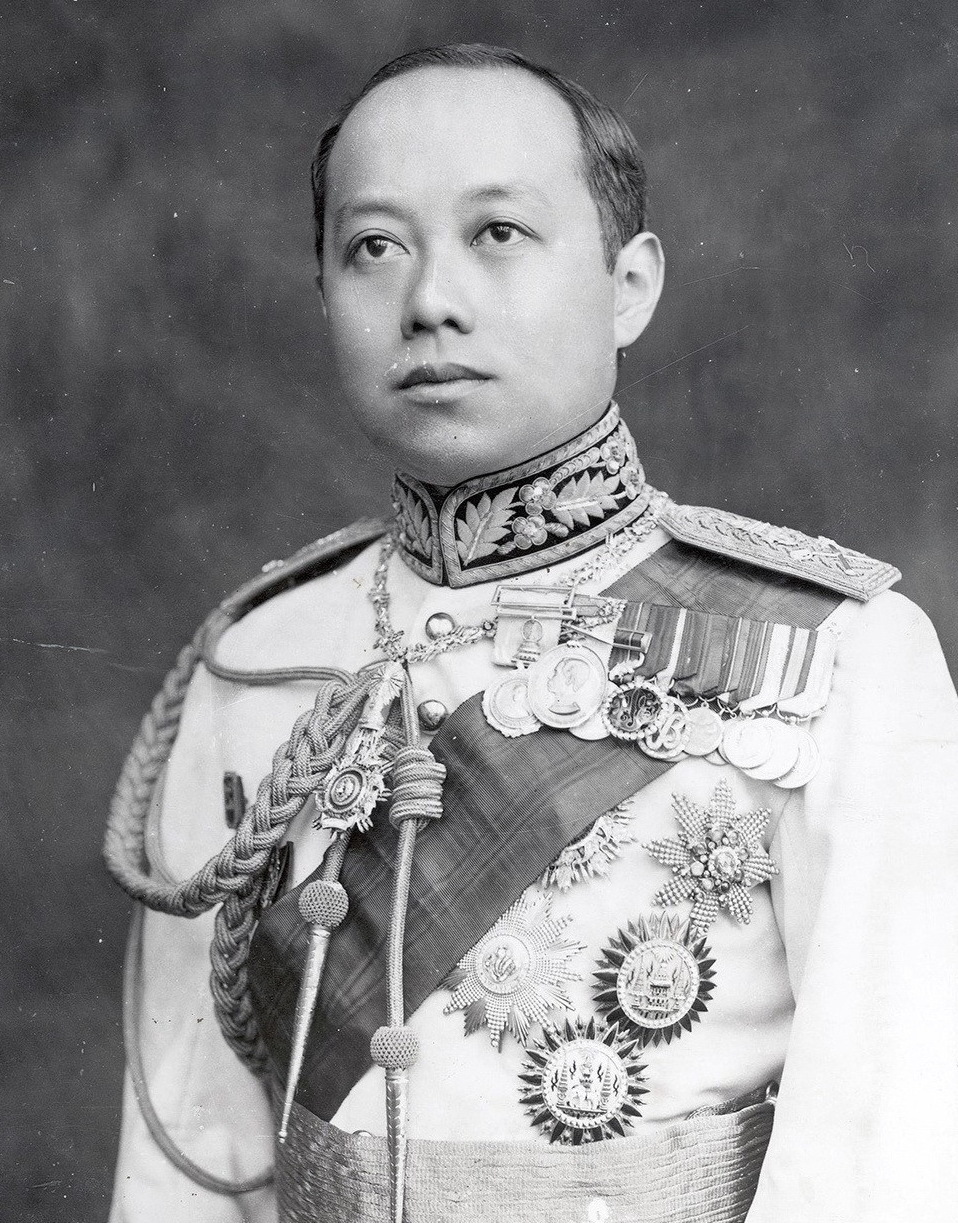
Vajiravudh

As uparat, Prince Yodyingyot, who resided in the Front Palace previously occupied by his father, Phra Pinklao, had 2,000 of his own troops and modern military equipment. In the Front Palace crisis of 1875, the troops of King Chulalongkorn (Rama V, reigned 1868–1910) and Prince Yodyingyot nearly clashed when it appeared that the latter was challenging the throne. Prince Yodyingyot sought refuge in the British consulate and, after lengthy negotiations, his troops were disarmed and the prince allowed to return to the Front Palace. When Prince Yodyingyout died in 1885, King Chulalongkorn discontinued the Front Palace and uparat system entirely. A year later, King Chulalongkorn elevated the oldest, full-blooded prince among his sons, Prince Vajirunhis (1878–1895) to the position of Crown Prince (Thai: สมเด็จพระบรมโอรสาธิราช สยามมกุฎราชกุมาร; RTGS: Somdet Phra Boromma-orasathirat Sayam Makut Ratchakuman). The investiture came well ahead of any expected succession. It was not surprising that the king at this time should choose a modified system of primogeniture to designate his heir apparent. A succession crisis might have left Siam vulnerable to interference from predatory, encroaching Western colonial powers. As Wyatt noted: "By 1910 [the year of King Chulalongkorn's death] the Siamese had abandoned the old rules of succession to the throne and had adopted the Western pattern of designating the heir to the throne long in advance."

The accession of King Vajiravudh (Rama VI, reigned 1910–1925) was the least problematic succession in the history of the Royal House of Chakri up to that point. After the premature death of Crown Prince Maha Vajirunhis, his younger half brother, Prince Vajiravudh was invested as crown prince in 1895 and, upon the death of his father King Chulalongkorn, acceded to the throne. Based on his own experience as heir, King Vajiravudh knew that his father had wanted to institute a more ordered system of succession on the basis of primogeniture which unequivocally designated a crown prince. During his reign, he set the precedent for numbering Kings of Thailand as "Rama" by styling himself as Phra Ram thi Hok (พระรามที่หก.) Rama VI, however, was unable to produce a male heir and, as a result, succession became an issue again.

Of the 77 children fathered by King Chulalongkorn, only seven sons born of queens survived beyond 1910, In the early 1920s, two of King Vajiravudh's three full brothers died. By the end of 1925, only the youngest brother, Prince Prajadhipok, was still alive. As a result, Wyatt writes that, "the problem of succession to the throne came to prominence rather suddenly in the last few years of the reign". This situation provided important impetus for drafting the Palace Law of Succession or kot monthian ban wa duai kan suep santatiwong in 1924. This law which continues to provide the framework for succession today, confirmed the primacy of the lineage of King Chulalongkorn and Queen Saovabha, as well as the king's sole and authentic right to choose his successor. It also made the determination of succession as legally precise and binding as possible.

== Details of succession ==
In the first section, King Vajiravudh states that "according to royal tradition, Siamese Kings have the sole power and prerogative to designate any descendant of the royal family as heir to the throne". Explaining why this new law was needed, King Vajiravudh wrote:

"But as it has been in the past, and could be in the future, the king cannot name his own successor ... resulting in troubling events ... When kings have died, the vying for royal power has opened an opportunity for persons ... who have been obstructive to the prosperity of the kingdom. It has also been the opportunity for enemies, both internal and external, to think of doing harm to the royal family and the freedom of Siam. [Such situation] has brought disaster to the Thai nation. The king has thus desired to have a law determining succession in order to reduce the trouble of contending [for the throne] within the royal family."

According to King Vajiravudh, it was his father's intention to bring Thai royal successions into closer line with those of other nations. The important principles established by the law concern the king's right to name or remove an heir apparent, the procedures to be used if the king has not named an heir apparent, and also a description of the suitable characteristics for an heir to the throne.

The reigning king has absolute power to name any royal male as heir apparent, and upon being announced publicly, the "position of such heir is secure and indisputable":

- Section 5 – The king has the sole power and prerogative to designate any descendant of the royal family as heir to the throne, depending on his judgement and trust placed on the ability of the said person to succeed him.
- Section 6 – Once the king has designated the heir to the throne and has had such designation proclaimed to members of the royal family, officials and the public at large, the position of such heir is secure and indisputable. When the necessary time comes, the said heir shall immediately ascend the throne to succeed the late king in accordance with the latter's wish.

The king also has absolute power to remove an heir apparent from the position. If he does so, "his entire lineage is removed from any claim to the throne":

- Section 7 – The king has the sole power and prerogative to remove the heir to the throne from his position. Anyone who has been removed from the position of heir to the throne shall be considered as broken from [excluded from] any claim to succession and his name shall be removed from the line of succession. His sons and his entire lineage of direct descendants shall also be excluded from the line of succession. The king has the sole power and prerogative to exclude any member of the royalty from the line of succession.
- Section 8 and 9 lay out the processes by which a new king is determined when the king dies with no heir designated. In such case, the chief state official is to invite the first in line of succession to be king. Section 9 was set out "to clear any doubt" as to "the order in the line of succession", delineated down to 13 levels. Below are the first six levels:
  - The first-born son of the king and queen;
  - The first-born son of the said prince and his royal consort;
  - Younger sons, in order, of the said prince and his royal consort;
  - The second-born son of the king and queen when the first-born son is deceased and has no male children;
  - The first-born son of the second-born son of the king and queen if the second-born son is deceased;
  - Younger sons, in order, of the second-born son [and so on].

While Section 9 ranks those eligible for kingship, the law's next set of clause entitled, "On those who must be excluded from the line of succession", describes what might disqualify a potential heir to the throne.

- Section 10 addresses members of royalty in the line of succession who may be unsuitable to accede. This Section is not really so much a law as a piece of advice. It states:

"Whoever is to ascend to the throne should be one from the masses fully respect and can be contentedly taken as their protector. Therefore any member of the royalty whom the multitude holds as loathsome, such person should forswear the path to succession in order to remove the worry from the king and the people from the realm."

- Section 11 states: "Descendants of the royal family with any of the following characters shall be excluded from the line of succession:
  - Insanity;
  - Convicted of a serious crime under the law;
  - Unable to serve as Upholder of Buddhism;
  - Married to a foreign consort, i.e. a woman whose nationality is originally not Thai;
  - Being removed from the position of heir to the throne regardless of during which reign such removal took place;
  - Being proclaimed to be excluded from the line of succession.

The last exclusion, Section 13, pertains to accession by a princess:

- Section 13 – As it is deemed to be untimely for a princess to ascend the throne as a sole sovereign of Siam, inclusion of princesses in the line of succession shall be categorically prohibited.

Other points in the law provide guidance for when the new king is a minor under 20 years of age (a member of the royalty is to be named as regent and the two most senior privy councillors are to act as advisers). Procedures were also put in place for future kings to amend the law. They are advised to keep in mind that the law was written to strengthen the dynasty, and that amendments required approval from two-thirds of the Privy Council.

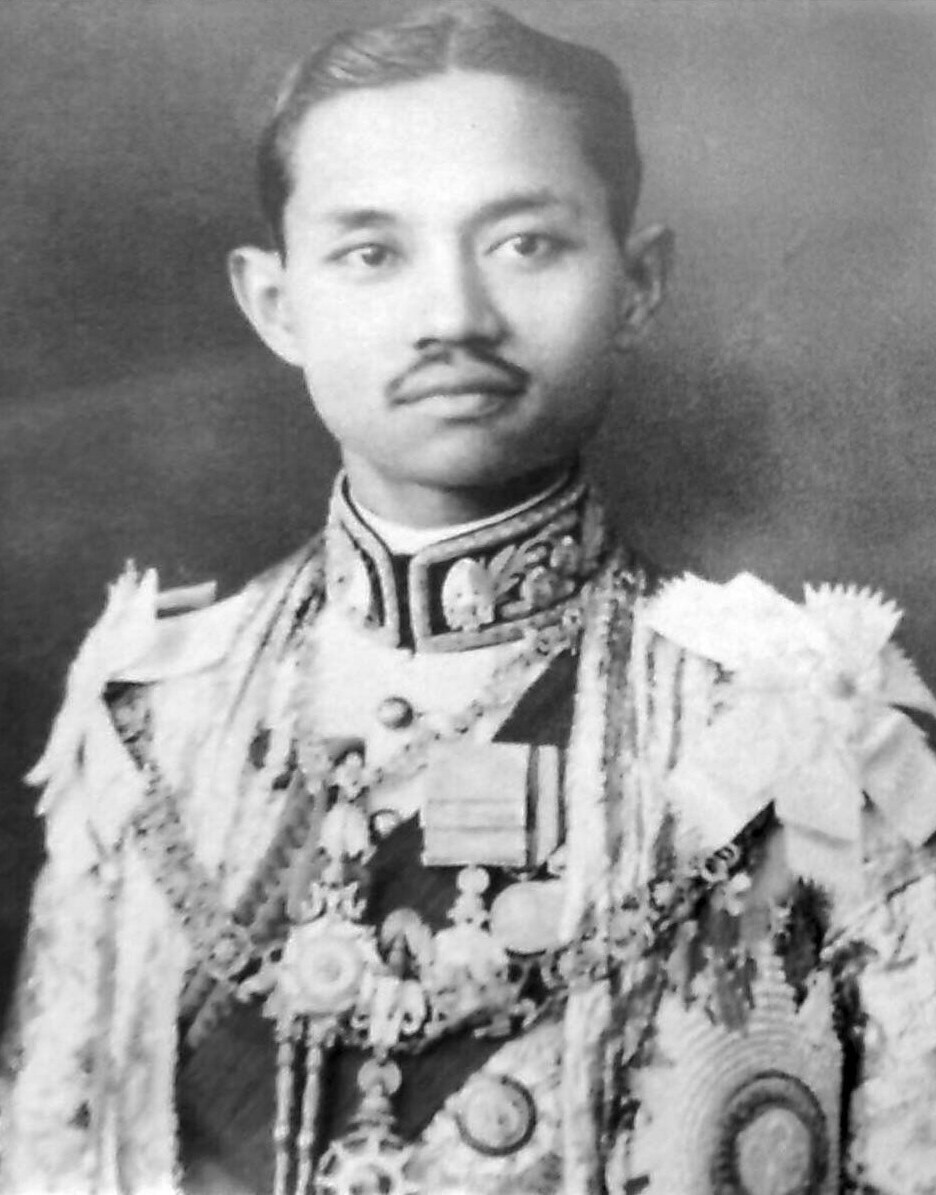
Prajadhipok

The 1924 Palace Law of Succession was put into effect the following year with the accession of King Prajadhipok (Rama VII, reigned 1925–1935). He had never been groomed for the throne, nor had he ever expected to accede or aspired to doing so. He had spent most of his adult life in military schools (Royal Military Academy, Woolwich in England and L'École Supérieure de Guerre in France) and had only returned to Siam in 1924. When his older brother died late the following year, he was at the top of the succession list and became Siam's last absolute monarch.

Although the Palace Law on Succession worked in 1925, there remained some underlying problems. King Prajadhipok wrote in 1926 that the law still embodied the two distinct and rather contradictory principles that had long characterized succession in Siam: "the principle of election and the principle of hereditary succession". For example, if the king did not designate his own successor, the throne was to go to one of his sons. King Prajadhipok remarked, "This sounded straightforward enough, but a complication arises here owing to the habit of polygamy." The law specified that the next king was to be chosen according to the rank of his mother, the queen. But there were four ranks of queen, and this arrangement was complicated by the fact that the rank of a queen could either be raised or lowered "according to the whims of the king". Thus several people could still make competitive claims to the throne. King Prajadhipok observed: "This, to my mind, creates very great possibilities of complications." In addition, he was not convinced that the flexibility in the law, which allowed for a monarch to choose a successor who would please the people, could be properly applied.

== Historical practice ==
Royal wives of Chulalongkorn

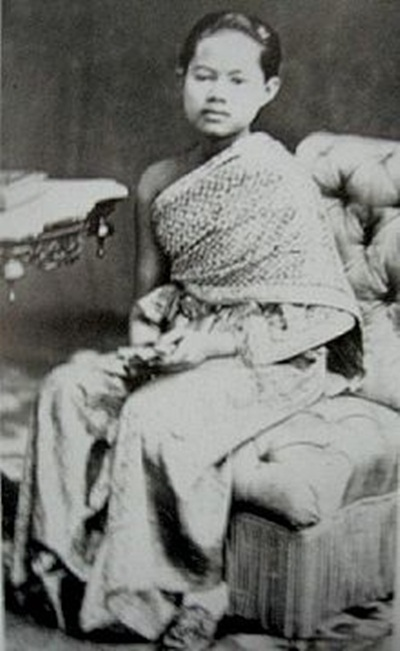
Sunanda Kumariratana

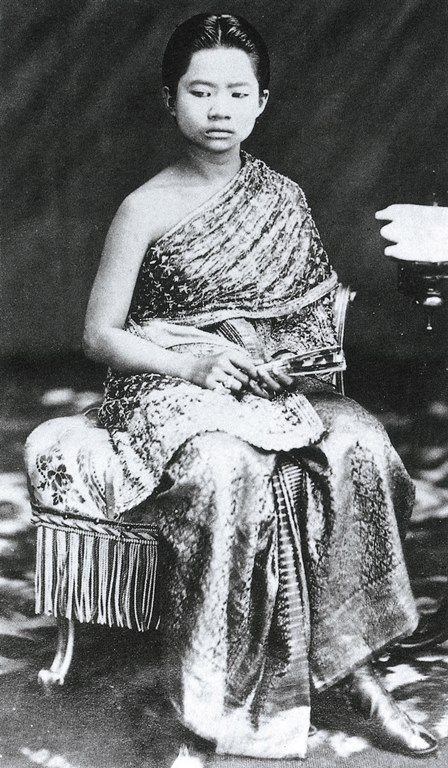
Sukhumala Marasri

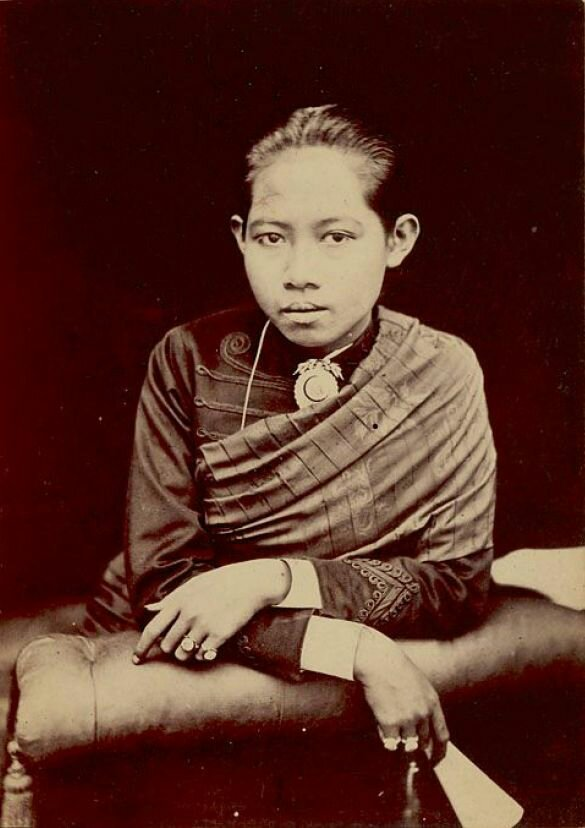
Savang Vadhana

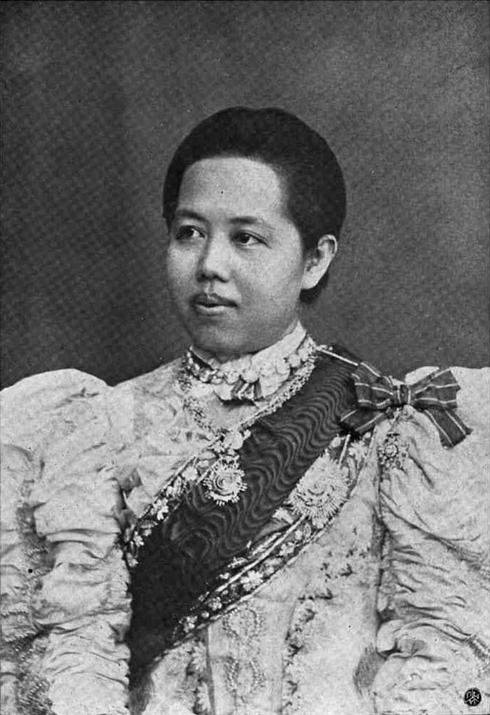
Saovabha Phongsri

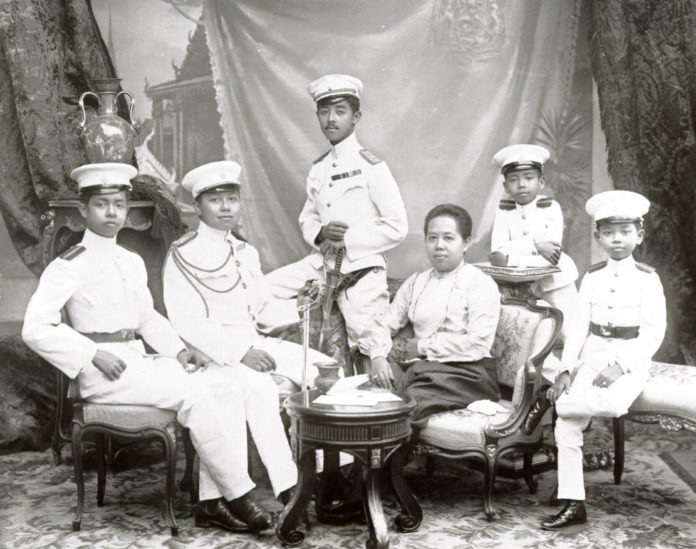
The Saovabha branch, circa 1900 (from left to right: Prince Asdang, Crown Prince Vajiravudh, Prince Chakrabongse, Queen Saovabha, Prince Prajadhipok, and Prince Chudadhuj)

On 11 November 1924, King Vajiravudh amended the Palace Law outlining a list of succession which adhered strictly to the Rules of Primogeniture, clearly stating that the son of a deceased heir would have precedence over the younger brother of his late father. This followed the European concept of primogeniture with added difference that whilst in Europe all male offspring would have their place in the line of succession, in Thailand rights of succession are only to be found in the male offspring who are descended from the King by royal consorts. King Vajiravudh also clearly outlines the various groups of consorts and grants rights of succession to their descendants in order of the seniority of the title of the consort – that is, the descendants of a consort of the first rank come before those of a consort of the second rank in the list of succession, and so on. The system applies equally to his own reign as to all previous and future reigns of the Chakri dynasty. Thus, if the line of the reigning King fails, on his death one searches amongst the line of his predecessor for an heir, and if that line has failed, amongst the line of his predecessor. Rights of succession are thus clearly vested in all lines of descent from King Rama I through a King and a royal consort.

Whilst no specific reference is made to the individual consorts of each reign by name, the interpretation of the list of succession with reference to the Royal Family in 1924 is that the descendants of King Chulalongkorn (Rama V) by Queen Saovabha Phongsri (1864–1919) have rights above those of his descendants by Queen Savang Vadhana (1862–1955), and those of Queen Savang Vadhana above those of Queen Sukhumala Marasri (1861–1927), etc.

King Chulalongkorn fathered a total of 77 children of which there were 32 sons (however a lesser number survived into adulthood) by 4 different queens and 32 consorts but most of them were born of non-royal wives or Chao Chom Manda. Between the 1910s and 1920s, there were only seven sons born of three principal queens with princely rank of Chao Fa (Thai: เจ้าฟ้า; "sky lord" or "celestial prince") as follows:-

- 5 princes by Queen Saovabha Phongsri
  - Crown Prince Maha Vajiravudh (Rama VI, 1881–1925 reigned 1910–1925) had one daughter by his consort, Princess Suvadhana
    - Princess Bejaratana Rajasuda (1925–2011)
  - Prince Chakrabongse Bhuvanath (1883–1920) had one son by his Russian wife, Mom Catherine Na Phitsanulok (née Catherine/Ekaterina "Katya" Ivanovna Desnitskaya)
    - Prince Chula Chakrabongse (1908–1963)
  - Prince Asdang Dejavudh (1889–1925)
  - Prince Chudadhuj Dharadilok (1892–1923) had one son by a commoner maid
    - Prince Varananda Dhavaj (1922–1990)
  - Prince Prajadhipok Sakdidej (Rama VII, 1893–1941 reigned 1925–1935) had no issue
- 3 princes by Queen Savang Vadhana
  - Crown Prince Maha Vajirunhis (1878-1895)
  - Prince Sommatiwongse Varodaya (1882-1899)
  - Prince Mahidol Adulyadej (1892–1929) had two sons by his commoner and royally-recognized wife, Mom Sangwan (later known as The Princess Mother)
    - Prince Ananda Mahidol (Rama VIII; 1925–1946 reigned 1935–1946)
    - Prince Bhumibol Adulyadej (Rama IX; 1927–2016 reigned 1946–2016)
      - Crown Prince Vajiralongkorn (Rama X; born 1952 and reigning from 2016)
- 1 prince by Queen Sukhumala Marasri
  - Prince Paribatra Sukhumbandhu (1881–1944) had two sons
    - Prince Chumbhotbongs Paribatra (1904–1959) by a royal wife
    - Prince Sukhumabhinanda (1923–2003) by a commoner wife

During the reign of King Vajiravudh, two of his full brothers, Prince Chudadhuj Dharadilok and Prince Asdang Dejavudh died in 1923 and 1925 respectively. Another brother and heir presumptive, Prince Chakrabongse Bhuvanath died in 1920 not long after divorcing his Russian wife, Katya. Their only son, Prince Chula Chakrabongse, was excluded from the succession because his mother was a foreigner under Section 11 (4) of the 1924 Palace Law. While Prince Varananda Dhavaj, only son of Prince Chudadhuj Dharadilok from a morganatic union, was considered, by royal discretion, ineligible to the throne.

According to the Palace Law, Prince Prajadhipok, the only surviving full brother of King Vajiravudh via bloodline of Queen Saovabha Phongsri, was then the next in line to the throne. Prince Mahidol Adulyadej became second in line (although older than Prince Prajadhipok, he was son of Queen Savang Vadhana). Third and fourth in line would be his two sons: Prince Ananda Mahidol and Prince Bhumibol Adulyadej. Last in line would have been Prince Paribatra Sukhumbandhu, only son of Queen Sukhumala Malasri, although this was unlikely given he had been exiled in the Siamese revolution of 1932.

The law based on the principle of male primogeniture, with first in line being the eldest son of the previous monarch and second in line being the next-oldest son, and so on. The law expressly ruled against women ascending the throne (this clause was abrogated in the 1997 Constitution).

This line of succession was followed when King Vajiravudh died on 26 November 1925, with Prince Prajadhipok succeeding as King Rama VII. Neither King Vajiravudh nor his successor had sons. The latter was childless while the former's only offspring was a daughter, who was born two days before his death and was excluded from the line of succession under Section 13 of the Palace Law.

The absolute monarchy was overthrown on 24 June 1932 and the king was placed within a constitutional framework, but the new constitution continued to rely on the Palace Law regarding matters of succession. Many of the 18 constitutions that have followed since 1932 contain provisions concerning succession and all of them have affirmed that choosing an heir apparent is a prerogative of the king. In the absence of a designated heir, these constitutions generally left the questions of succession up to the Privy Council or members of the royal family working under the 1924 Palace Law of Succession.

In 1935 when King Prajadhipok abdicated without designating an heir, the cabinet took five days to consider possible successors within the Royal House of Chakri bloodline before setting upon Prince Ananda Mahidol, the eldest heir of Prince Mahidol Adulyadej. This choice followed the 1924 Law of Succession and was also approved by the National Assembly. No debate was needed when the unmarried young King Ananda Mahidol died unexpectedly on 9 June 1946. His younger brother, Prince Bhumibol Adulyadej, was undisputed heir and succeeded to the throne, reigning until his death on 13 October 2016.

== The law today ==
The 1997 constitution of Thailand, like most preceding Thai constitutions, continued to rely on the Palace Law with regard to succession. However, the 2006 Interim Constitution does not contain any articles regarding succession, and instead, left it to "constitutional practice." Sections 22 and 23 of the 2007 Constitution dealing with succession again relied on the Palace Law.

King Bhumibol Adulyadej officially appointed Prince Vajiralongkorn, his eldest and only son, as Crown Prince and successor on 28 December 1972. The Thai constitution was amended in 1974 to allow the Privy Council to appoint a princess as successor to the throne, if the monarch had not previously appointed a successor. This change made for the possibility of an eventual female succession in the absence of male heir (something not hitherto allowed for). These rights of succession of a female are strictly defined and apply only to the daughters of a king, and may only come into effect following the approval of the legislative assembly. However this would definitely occur in the absence of a royally appointed successor. This amendment is retained in Section 23 of the 1997 "People's Constitution" and 2007 Constitution, and Section 21 of the 2017 Constitution.

"In the case where the throne becomes vacant and the king has not appointed his heir under paragraph one, the Privy Council shall submit the name of successor to the throne under Section 22 to the Council of Ministers [cabinet] for further submission to the National Assembly for approval. For this purpose, the name of a Princess may be submitted. Upon the approval of the National Assembly, the president of the National Assembly shall invite such successor to ascend the throne and proclaim such successor Queen."

Recent constitutions of Thailand have made the amendment of the Palace Law of Succession the sole prerogative of the reigning King. According to Gothom Arya, former Election Commissioner, this allows the reigning king, if he so chooses, to appoint his son or any of his daughters to the Throne.

The Palace Law of Succession, the Constitutions of Thailand, and the appointment of Prince Vajiralongkorn as successor in 1972 left nothing uncertain about the succession - upon the death of King Rama IX, the Cabinet was legally bound to inform the president of the National Assembly, which was in turn legally bound to invite Crown Prince Vajiralongkorn to become king.

On the evening of 13 October 2016, Prime Minister Prayut Chan-o-cha announced "Dear Thai people, His Majesty the King Bhumibol Adulyadej, the Ninth of His Dynasty, has passed away. Long live His Majesty the King of the New Reign." Parliament was scheduled for a meeting at 9 pm, and some news outlets assumed that this meant that Crown Prince Vajiralongkorn would be proclaimed King.

Parliament met at 9:30 pm. An announcement was made about the death of the King. The members of the National Legislative Assembly (NLA) stood for 9 minutes of silence. The president of the NLA announced that the National Legislative Assembly would execute section 23 of the 2007 Constitution and the Palace Law, but he did not specify when. The parliamentary session was closed at 9:45 pm. At 9:40 pm, Prime Minister Prayut Chan-o-cha announced that earlier in the evening, he had been granted an audience with Crown Prince Vajiralongkorn, who told him he would like to take some time to grieve before accepting the invitation to become the new king, and that in the meantime he would undertake the royal duties of the Crown Prince.

"Right now we have no king," said Peerasak Porjit, vice president of the National Legislative Assembly on 14 October. "So, all of the royal duties of a king must be done through the regent." He confirmed that General Prem Tinsulanonda, President of the Privy council, was regent indefinitely, in accordance with the Constitution. Some succession law experts have expressed puzzlement at the lack of succession.

On 1 December 2016, after 50 days has passed since the death of King Bhumibol Adulyadej, Crown Prince Maha Vajiralongkorn granted an audience to Prayut Chan-o-cha the Prime Minister, Pornpetch Wichitcholchai the President of the National Legislative Assembly (NLA), and Prem Tinsulanonda the Regent pro tempore at the Amphorn Sathan Residential Hall in Dusit Palace and accepted an invitation to ascend the throne from the President of the NLA in order to "fulfill the royal intentions of the late King for the benefit and happiness of all Thais". He was proclaimed as King Rama X in the name of His Majesty King Maha Vajiralongkorn Bodindradebayavarangkun.

== Succession in practice ==
It was made clear by the Thai Government after the death of King Bhumibol Adulyadej that the succession is not automatic and needed to go through official procedures before proclaiming the heir as new monarch.

During this period there will be no King, the heir will remain functional on his current title, and the president of the privy council will fulfill the role of regency pro tempore if there is no appointed regent at a time.
1. Meeting of the Council of Ministers to confirm the heir name.
2. Meeting of the National Assembly to confirm the heir name, and vest the power to the President of the National Assembly to invite the heir to be the new monarch.
3. The heir grants the audience to Prime Minister, President of the National Assembly, President of the Supreme Court, and Regent pro tempore to functioning as an ad hoc Accession Council.
4. Invited the heir to become the new monarch by the President of the National Assembly.
5. The heir accept the invitation and become the new monarch.
6. Office of the Prime Minister Office, The National Assembly, and The Royal Household issue the official announcement, and announce the monarch temporary reigning title.

== Line of succession ==
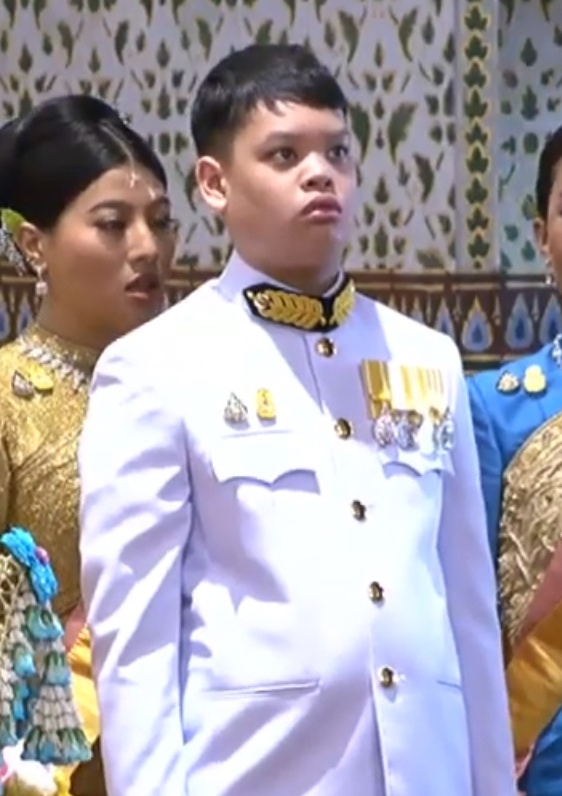
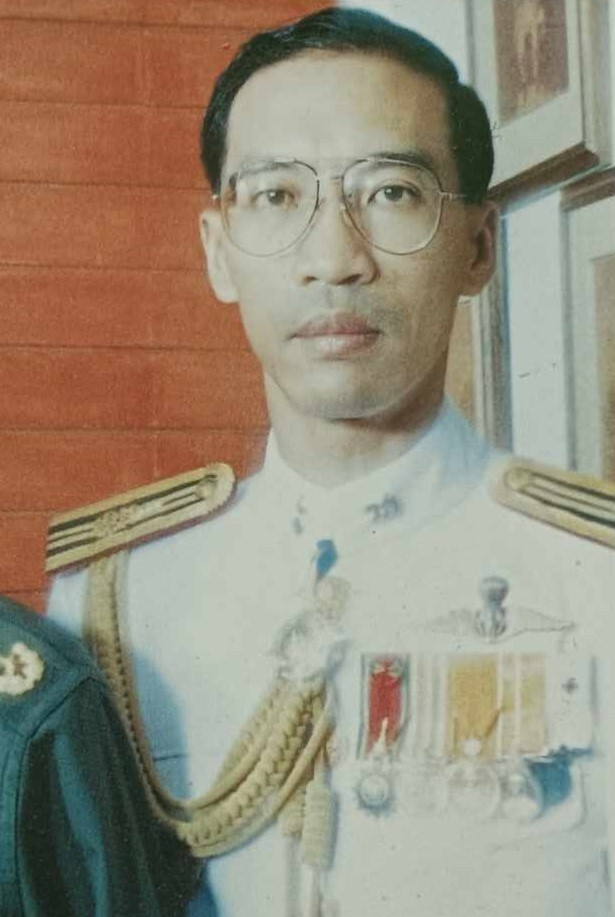
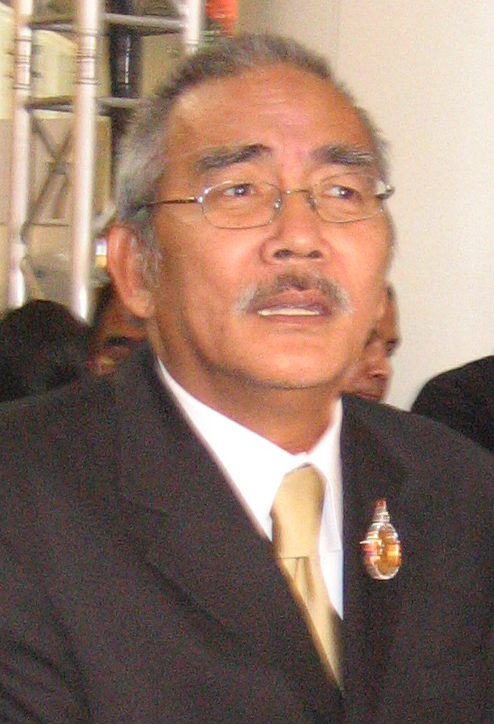
First five according to the Royal Succession Act (male heirs only) as of July 2, 2026
| 1. Prince Dipangkorn Rasmijoti |
| 2. Prince Navaphan |
| 3. Prince Chalermsuk |
| 4. Prince Dighamborn |
| 5. Prince Chatrichalerm |

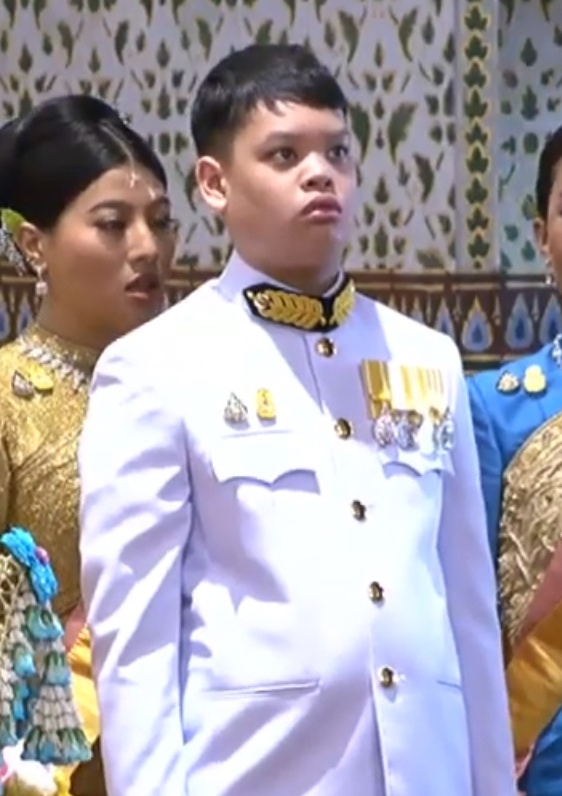
First five in line as of July 2, 2026 (male and female)
| 1. Prince Dipangkorn Rasmijoti |
| 2. Princess Sirivannavari |
| 3. The Princess Royal |
| 4. The Princess Srisavangavadhana |
| 5. Princess Siribha Chudabhorn |

- King Bhumibol Adulyadej (1927–2016)
  - King Vajiralongkorn (born 1952)
    - (–) Juthavachara Vivacharawongse (b. 1979)^{X M P C}
    - (–) Vacharaesorn Vivacharawongse (b. 1981)^{X P C}
    - (–) Chakriwat Vivacharawongse (b. 1983)^{X P C}
    - (–) Vatchrawee Vivacharawongse (b. 1985)^{X P C}
    - (2) Princess Sirivannavari (b. 1987)^{C}
    - (1) Prince Dipangkorn Rasmijoti (b. 2005)^{P C}
  - (–) Princess Ubolratana Rajakanya (b. 1951)^{X C}
  - (3) Sirindhorn, Princess Royal (b. 1955)^{C}
  - (4) Chulabhorn, Princess Srisavangavadhana (b. 1957)^{C}

Notes and sources
| Mark | Source for listing or note on exclusion from succession |
|---|---|
| P | 1924 Palace Law of Succession |
| C | 1. In the case where the Throne becomes vacant and the King has already appointed an Heir to the Throne under the 1924 Palace Law on Succession, and may be submitted the name of a Princess in "Constitution of the Kingdom of Thailand 2017" Chapter II: The King, Section 21.; 2. The proposal of the name of a Princess to the throne, there has been an amendment to the constitution since 1974. Therefore, the lineage of the King Bhumibol Adulyadej is counted in accordance with the constitution amended in his reign. |
| M | Disqualified - married a foreigner |
| X | Was degraded from succession |

== See also ==
- Crown Prince of Thailand
- Coronation of the Thai monarch
- Monarchy of Thailand
- Constitution of Thailand
- Bhumibol Adulyadej
- Ananda Mahidol
- Prajadhipok
- Privy Council of Thailand
- Regent of Thailand
