= Prawase Wasi =

Thai physician and public intellectual (1931–2026)

Prawase Wasi (Thai: ประเวศ วะสี; RTGS: Prawet Wasi, 5 August 1931 – 10 January 2026) was a Thai hematologist, political actor and public intellectual. A highly influential figure, his works ranged from thalassaemia-related research and helping develop Thailand's healthcare systems to initiating and backing the 1997 constitution of Thailand. He received the Ramon Magsaysay Award for government service in 1981.

== Life and career ==
Born in Kanchanaburi Province, Prawase graduated in medicine from Siriraj Hospital and undertook postgraduate studies at the University of Colorado and London University. He returned to teach as a professor at Siriraj (under Mahidol University, where he became vice president), publishing over 100 research articles, as well as advocating for rural public health development. He was indirectly active in politics, and wrote on political reform, civil society and social change. A liberal royalist, he based much of his writings on Buddhist philosophy. He promoted democratic decentralization, and supported the establishment of various non-governmental organizations. He chaired the Democracy Development Committee, which led to the drafting of the 1997 constitution, and successfully pushed for its adoption.

Wasi died on 10 January 2026, at the age of 94.
