= National Human Rights Commission (Thailand) =

National Human Rights Commission of Thailand
- คณะกรรมการสิทธิมนุษยชนแห่งชาติ Khana Kammakan Sitthi Manutsayachon Haeng Chat
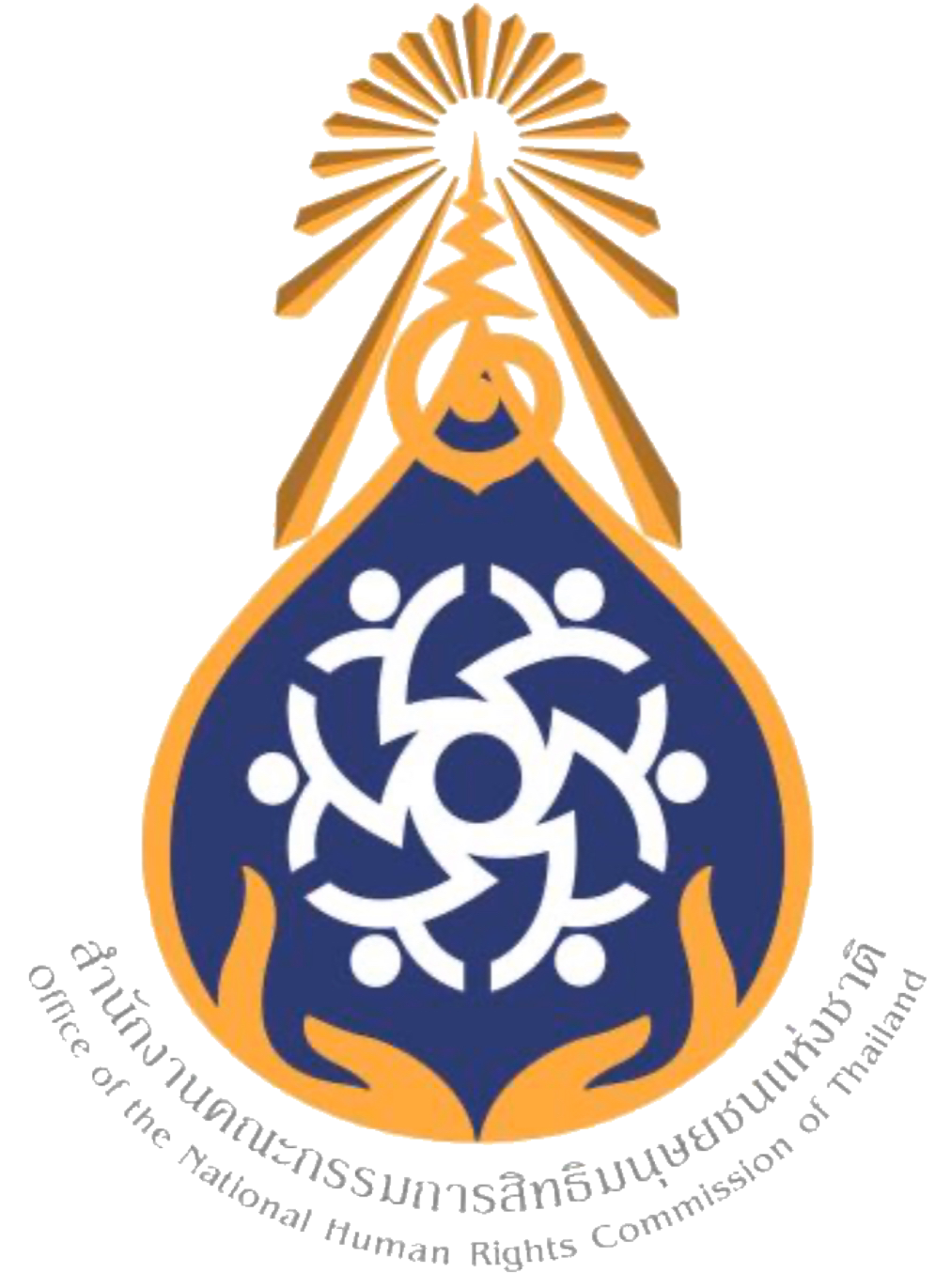

Agency overview
- Formed: 13 July 2001
- Type: Constitutional organization
- Headquarters: Bangkok, Thailand
- Annual budget: 211.3 million baht (FY2019)
- Agency executives: What Tingsamitr, Chairman; Pirom Sriprasert, Secretary-General
- Website: Official website

The National Human Rights Commission of Thailand (Abrv: NHRCT; Thai: คณะกรรมการสิทธิมนุษยชนแห่งชาติ, RTGS: Khana Kammakan Sitthi Manutsayachon Haeng Chat) was established on 13 July 2001 as a national human rights institution. The seven member commission has been unable to meet for want of a quorum since 30 July 2019, when two commissioners resigned, stating that they could "no longer perform their duties independently and effectively due to restrictive regulations and a hostile and toxic environment."

== Inception ==
The commission came into being after a clash, known as "Black May", between pro-democracy demonstrators and the military in May 1992 which resulted in numerous casualties. The cabinet (42: Prem Tinsulanonda 3 March 1980 – 30 April 1983) passed a resolution in September 1992, to establish a national organization to protect human rights. The national human rights commission was eventually mandated in Article 199 and 200 of the constitution adopted in October 1997, and formally constituted in July 2001. From its inception to 31 May 2005, it received 2,148 complaints of which 1,309 had already been investigated, 559 were still in the process of investigation, and 209 were in the process of evidence gathering. The complaints covered not only civil and political rights, but also other rights including economic, social, and cultural. As for the "clash" that inspired the NHRCT, on 16 May 2002, Amnesty International issued a press release noting that ten years later, justice had still not been served.

The NHRCT has been receiving a decreasing number of complaints from the public from FY2003 to FY2015, the last year reported.

== Organization and budget ==
The NHRCT is composed of the commission, headed by a chairman, and six commissioners. As of 2018 the commission chairman is What Tingsamitr. The commission is supported by the Office of the National Human Rights Commission. Its secretary-general as of 2018 is Pirom Sriprasert.

The FY2019 budget of the NHRCT is 211.3 million baht.

== Governmental interference ==
The NHRCT, according to human rights watchdogs, has faced governmental interference since its inception. Commissioners Angkhana Neelaphaijit and Tuenjai Deetes announced their resignations in July 2019, stating they could no longer perform their duties independently and effectively due to restrictive regulations and a hostile and unsupportive office environment. Two other commissioners had resigned earlier.

=== 2006 coup ===
The NHRCT began to experience difficulties after the Thai military seized power in the 2006 Thailand coup. The commission remained in existence but members have not been appointed to replace those whose terms have come to an end. Saneh Chamarik, chairman of the Commission, defending the coup, stated in an interview, "I do not think [the coup] is about progression or regression [of democracy], but about problem solving." His remark was criticized by Suwit Lertkraimethi, an organizer of the 19 September Network against Coup d'Etat, who noted, "His role is to protect human rights, but his statement showed his approval of human-rights violations." Suwit demanded Saneh's resignation from the NHRCT.

=== Under the NCPO ===
Human Rights Watch have charged that, following the 2014 Thai coup d'état, the National Council for Peace and Order, the junta's ruling body, has taken steps to weaken the NHRCT. A 2017 NHRCT Act stripped away its independence and transformed it into a de facto governmental mouthpiece. In early-2019, a sitting NHRCT commissioner who documented rights violations against opposition politicians and critics of the NCPO is under investigation and faces possible impeachment.

== Accreditation ==
The Global Alliance of National Human Rights Institutions (GANHRI), formerly the International Co-ordinating Committee of National Human Rights Institutions (ICC), and the United Nations Human Rights Council downgraded the NHRCT's global ranking from "A" to "B" in 2015. The action revoked Thailand's privilege to speak from the council floor and present its views during council sessions. The downgrade stemmed from the Thai government's manipulation of the selection process for commissioners and questions about the commission's pro-government political bias. It was determined that the composition of the NHRCT was not diverse, it lacked public input, and it failed to address human rights issues in a timely manner (the NHRCT took three years to complete and publish a report into alleged human rights violations in 2010, and in 2014 had failed to produce a report on incidents in 2013).

B status means that the NHRCT is not permitted to express its opinions or present written documents to the UN Human Rights Council, it is reduced to observer status at regional and international human rights conferences, and it is stripped of its vote at meetings of the GANHRI.

== Notable decisions ==
- On 16 June 2011, the Office of the President of Khon Kaen University (KKU) accused Faculty of Law acting dean Kittibodi Yaipool and his staff of destroying official documents, and barred them from entering the grounds of the faculty. Kittibodi appealed to the NHRCT, which met in July to consider the case. On 28 February 2012, the NHRCT issued a report condemning KKU for arbitrarily and unjustly dismissing Kittibodi, urged the university to exonerate Kittibodi and his personnel, and consider reinstating them to their former positions.

== See also ==
- Constitutional organizations of Thailand
