= Amorn Chantarasomboon =

Amorn Chantarasomboon (Thai: อมร จันทรสมบูรณ์) is a Thai expert on public law and constitutional law. He was a former Secretary-General of the Council of State and was a key drafter of the 1997 Constitution (the so-called "People's Constitution"). He was identified as one of Thailand's 35 most influential intellectuals.

== Education and early career ==
Amorn graduated from Thammasat University in 1951 and finished a PhD in international law from the University of Paris in 1956. He served as Secretary-General of the Council of State from 1980 to 1990.

== Drafting of the 1997 constitution ==
Amorn became a highly influential member of the Constitution Drafting Assembly. The new constitution was promulgated on 11 October 1997 and became known as the People's Constitution. Some of the innovations of the constitution included increased decentralization of government, the establishment of several independent government agencies (like the Constitutional Court, Election Commission, the Office of the Auditor-General, and National Human Rights Commission), and mechanisms to increase political stability by favoring large parties over small ones - an attempt create a strong executive branch and discourage the formation of unstable coalition governments.

== Opposition to Thaksin Shinawatra ==
In 2001, Amorn publicly questioned the credibility of the Constitutional Court over its decision to clear newly elected Prime Minister Thaksin Shinawatra of assets concealment charges. The government of Thaksin Shinawatra gained power in the first election contested under the 1997 Constitution.

In 2004–2005, Amorn called for the a "Second Reform", noting that the strong Thaksin government resulted in a "tyranny by the majority" and "the worst kind of parliamentary dictatorship that this country has ever witnessed". He called for the establishment of a "third alternative party" which would push through another round of constitutional reform. High on his list of reforms would be cancelling a clause that bars members of the Parliament from standing independently. He also advocated for several royalist measures that would increase the powers of the King.

== See also ==
- Constitution of Thailand
- Anand Panyarachun, Chairman of the Drafting Committee of the Constitution Drafting Assembly
- Thaksin Shinawatra
