= Chai-Anan Samudavanija =

Thai political scientist

- ชัยอนันต์ สมุทวณิช

Judge of the Constitutional Court of Thailand

President of the Royal Institute of Thailand

Director of Vajiravudh College

Personal details
- Born: February 23, 1944
- Died: September 14, 2018 (aged 74) Bangkok, Thailand
- Education: Chulalongkorn University
- Occupation: Political scientist

Chai-Anan Samudavanija (Thai: ชัยอนันต์ สมุทวณิช; RTGS: Chai-a-nan Samutthawanit; 23 February 1944 – 14 September 2018) was a Thai political scientist. He served as a director of Vajiravudh College, president of the Royal Institute, judge of the Constitutional Court, and professor of political science at Chulalongkorn University. He was one of the key drafters of the 1997 constitution of Thailand. During the 2005–2006 political crisis, he was a vocal critic of Prime Minister Thaksin Shinawatra. He was associated with Sondhi Limthongkul: he chaired IEC and was head of several of Sondhi's foundations. Chai-Anan supported the 2006 military coup that overthrew the Thaksin government.

After gaining the support of the military and 40 provincial millionaires, Chai-Anan helped found the Matchima political party.

Chai-Anan died on 14 September 2018 at King Chulalongkorn Memorial Hospital at the age of 74.

== Academic rank ==
- Professor
