= Elective dictatorship =

One-government dominance of a parliament

"Elective dictatorship", also called "executive dominance" in political science, is a phrase describing the state in which a typical Westminster system state's parliament, the legislative power, is dominated by the government of the day, the executive power. It refers to the fact that the legislative programme of Parliament is determined by the government, and government bills virtually always pass the legislature because of the nature of the majoritarian first-past-the-post electoral system, which almost always produces strong government, in combination with the imposition of party discipline on the governing party's majority, which almost always ensures loyalty.

Specifically, executive dominance refers to "[a] parliamentary system that places considerable power in the hands of the Prime Minister and Cabinet through their ability to control the House of Commons, particularly in a majority government situation" Elective dictatorship refers to "[a] government that dominates Parliament, usually due to a large majority, and therefore has few limits on its power".

== Origin ==
The phrase was popularised by the former Lord Chancellor of the United Kingdom, Lord Hailsham, in a Richard Dimbleby Lecture at the BBC in 1976. The phrase is found a century earlier, in describing Giuseppe Garibaldi's doctrines, and was used by Hailsham (then known as Quintin Hogg) in lectures in 1968 and 1969.

== Proposals for reform ==
Some groups, such as Unlock Democracy, have argued that a codified, written constitution with appropriate checks and balances is also essential to solving the problem of executive dominance, but again without popular success. In 2025, with the Reform Party threatening to supersede the Conservative Party and win the 2029 election, concerns were expressed that the lack of a written constitution would allow an elective dictatorship in which parliament has seized the powers that should be vested in the people, and the prime minister has seized the powers that should be vested in parliament, to dismantle democracy.

The Power Inquiry in its 2006 report Power to the People made recommendations on how to deal with the democratic deficit inherent in the British system of governance.

== See also ==
- Democratic centralism
- Democratic deficit
- Elective monarchy
- Electoral autocracy
