= Politics of Thailand =

Politics of Thailand การเมืองไทย
- Emblem of Thailand
- Polity type: Unitary parliamentary constitutional monarchy (Note: Officially a democratic form of government with the king as head of state)
- Constitution: Constitution of Thailand

Legislative branch
- Name: National Assembly
- Type: Bicameral
- Meeting place: Sappaya-Sapasathan
- Upper house
- Name: Senate
- Presiding officer: Mongkol Surasajja, President of the Senate
- Appointer: Indirect limited voting with self-nomination
- Lower house
- Name: House of Representatives
- Presiding officer: Sophon Saram, Speaker
- Appointer: First-past-the-post system and Party-list proportional representation

Executive branch
- Head of state
- Title: Monarch
- Currently: Vajiralongkorn
- Appointer: Hereditary
- Head of government
- Title: Prime Minister
- Currently: Anutin Charnvirakul
- Appointer: Monarch (Nominated by House of Representatives)
- Cabinet
- Name: Council of Ministers of Thailand
- Current cabinet: Second Anutin cabinet
- Leader: Prime Minister
- Appointer: Monarch (by the advice of the Prime Minister)
- Headquarters: Government House
- Ministries: 20

Judicial branch
- Name: Judiciary
- Supreme Court
- Chief judge: Adisak Tantiwong
- Supreme Administrative Court
- Chief judge: Prasitsak Meelarp
- Constitutional Court
- Chief judge: Nakarin Mektrairat

The politics of Thailand are conducted within the framework of a constitutional monarchy, whereby the prime minister is the head of government and a hereditary monarch is head of state. The judiciary is independent of the executive and the legislative branches.

Following the coup d'état of 22 May 2014 revoking the 2007 constitution, a military organization called National Council for Peace and Order (NCPO) had taken over governmental administrations. The chief of NCPO abolished the national assembly and assumed the responsibilities of the legislative branch. Under the martial law enforced throughout the kingdom, military courts have been tasked to be responsible for some cases that are normally under the civilian courts. However, the court system, including the Constitutional Court, still remains in existence, even without the constitution. The NCPO was formally dissolved following the swearing-in of the new cabinet on 16 July 2019 The prime minister, Prayut Chan-o-cha, being the previous chief of NCPO, coup leader in the 2014 coup d'etat and responsible of the new 2017 constitution, had banned political activity, suppressed debate, restricted the media and detained dissidents until just months before the March 24 general election. After winning by a few seats, he changed all 250 members of the senate as stated in the constitution he redacted.

The Kingdom of Siam (now known as Thailand) was ruled as an absolute monarchy. After the Siamese revolution in 1932, led by westernized bureaucrats and a tradition-oriented military, Siam officially became a constitutional monarchy with a prime minister as the head of government. The first written constitution was issued. Politics became the arena of fighting factions between old and new elites, bureaucrats, and generals. Coups occurred from time to time, often bringing the country under the rule of military juntas. To date, Thailand has had 20 charters and constitutions, reflecting a high degree of political instability. After successful coups, military regimes have abrogated existing constitutions and promulgated interim charters. Negotiations between politicians, bureaucrats, influence peddlers, corporate leaders and army officers have become a driving force in the restoration of temporary political stability.

The Economist Intelligence Unit rated Thailand a "flawed democracy" in 2023. However, due to the impact of military juntas, Thailand has a status of an electoral autocracy, according to the V-Dem Democracy Indices.

== Politics of constitutions ==
Before the 1932 revolution, the kingdom had no written constitution. The monarch was the originator of all laws and the head of the government. In 1932 the first written constitution was issued, expected to be the most important guideline of the kingdom. Constitutions have traditionally been considered to be the "symbol of democracy" in Thailand, despite their many abrogations and changes. However, when political disputes took place among the elites, the first military coup occurred in 1933 and the first official constitution was removed, to be replaced by a new one.

All of Thailand's charters and constitutions have recognized a unified kingdom with a constitutional monarchy, but with widely differing balances of power between the branches of government. Most Thai governments have stipulated parliamentary systems. Several, however, also called for dictatorships, e.g., the 1959 constitution. Both unicameral and bicameral parliaments have been used, and members of parliament have been both elected and appointed. The direct powers of the monarch have also varied considerably.

Thailand's "popular constitution", called the "people's constitution" was successfully promulgated in 1997 after the 1992 Bloody May incident. Publicly, constitutional devices have often charged as the root of political turmoil. The 1997 constitution was considered a landmark for the degree of public participation involved in its drafting, as well as the democratic nature of its articles. It prescribed a bicameral legislature, both houses of which are elected. Many civil rights were explicitly acknowledged, and measures were established to increase the stability of elected governments. New organs supervising administrative power such as the Constitutional Court, the Administrative Court, and the Ombudsman also emerged for the first time. These organs later became a threat to politicians, particularly when the financial dealings of Thaksin Shinawatra, one of the most popular politicians in Thai history, became an issue.

Following an army-led coup on 19 September 2006, the 1997 constitution was abrogated. The junta ruled the country by martial law and executive decree for weeks, until it published an interim constitution on 1 October 2006. The interim constitution allowed the junta to appoint a prime minister, a legislature, and a committee to draft a permanent constitution. Local and municipal elections were held as usual. In 2007 the new constitution was eventually issued, said to be a "junta supported constitution" by many critics. The 2007 constitution was again abolished in another military takeover on 22 May 2014. According to the 2017 constitution, Thailand's entire political system is under the control of the army, through the appointed Senate but also via an array of military-dominated oversight bodies

The King of Thailand has little direct power under the constitution, but is a symbol of national identity and unity. King Bhumibol—on the throne from 1946 to 2016—commanded enormous popular respect and moral authority, which he used on occasion to resolve political crises that threatened national stability.

== Democracy post-1932 ==
Thailand was a kingdom under an absolute monarch for over seven centuries before 1932.

As a result of imperialism, the kings began minor reforms. The king was the president of the government, consulted with his councillors, mainly his relatives. Though significant reforms had occurred in Rama V's reign, the kingdom still had no national assembly. Men of royal blood held positions in the government as ministers. The situation became tense after the World War I. An economic crisis bedeviled the country. A young generation of students and intellectuals studying in Europe began criticizing the crown's government as backward, corrupt, and ineffective. On 24 June 1932, troops in Bangkok seized government buildings and some key ministers. The 1932 revolution took place. Its leaders were both bureaucrats and young military officers, urging national reforms, including the first written constitution. After negotiation with the king, Rama VII, and the kingdom's elite, changes took place, ending absolute rule by the king. The king remained the titular head of state, but the constitutional government ruled the country with the prime minister at its head. A general election was held for the creation of the first national assembly. The election was the first in which women were permitted to vote.

The period 1932–1973 has been described as semi-democratic.

Since becoming a Western-style constitutional democratic monarchy in 1932, most of the time the country has been ruled by military governments. The disputes and struggles among the elites old and new, civilians, politicians, and military have occurred regularly since 1932. The first military coup staged by the 1932 revolutionary, military wing itself, occurred in 1933. The military became a tool for political stability. Political freedom, freedom of speech, and basic human rights were strongly compromised in the first three-quarters of the 20th century.

Due to the pressure of outside events during the Vietnam War, the politics of the kingdom became even more tense. The military government, with the support of the US, tightened its control over the country's politics, while intellectuals and leftist students strongly opposed the junta.

The Communist Party of Thailand staged armed struggle in the countryside in the 1960s. Communist and radical ideas attracted a handful of intellectuals. The communist movement was seen as congruent with the independence movements in other Indochinese countries, waging war against the US. In response, the military junta tightened its grip.

Student-led uprisings in October 1973 led to the collapse of the military dictatorship. The media received more freedom to criticize politicians and governments, while revolutionary and socialist movements became more apparent. The new civilian government officially shut US bases amid the fear of communist victory in the Indochinese countries in 1975. In 1976, Admiral Sa-ngad Chaloryu, the armed forces commander, staged a massacre and coup that brought hard-line anti-communists to power and reversed these reforms.

At the end of the Indochina War, investment by foreign businesses helped alleviate poor infrastructure and social problems. The middle classes constituted only 10 per cent of the 60 million inhabitants. They enjoyed wealth and increasing freedom, leaving the majority poor in the rural areas and slums.

The system of rule fluctuated between unstable civilian governments and interludes of military takeover. During democratic periods, the middle class in the cities ignored the poor in the rural areas. The media accepted bribes. To corrupt bureaucrats and politicians became well-accepted business practice.

Every time a coup was staged, scapegoats or excuses were found to justify it. Eventually, the ensuing junta government would hand the government back to elected officials. As a result, there have been 18 coups and 18 constitutions in the history of Thai politics.

From 1932, bureaucrats, generals, and businessmen have run most of the political parties. While the grassroots are always the target of the political parties, no grassroots party has ever led the country. Money seems to be the major factor in gaining power in the country.

The Black May uprising, in 1992, lead to more reform when promulgating the 1997 constitution aiming to create checks and balance of powers between strengthened government, separately elected senators, and anti-corruption agencies. Administrative courts, constitutional courts, and election-control committees were established to strengthen the checks and balance of politics.

The 2007 constitution, following Thaksin's ousting, was particularly designed to be tighter in its control of corruptions and conflicts of interests while reducing the authority of the government. It was repealed in the 22 May 2014 coup d'état.

== Government ==
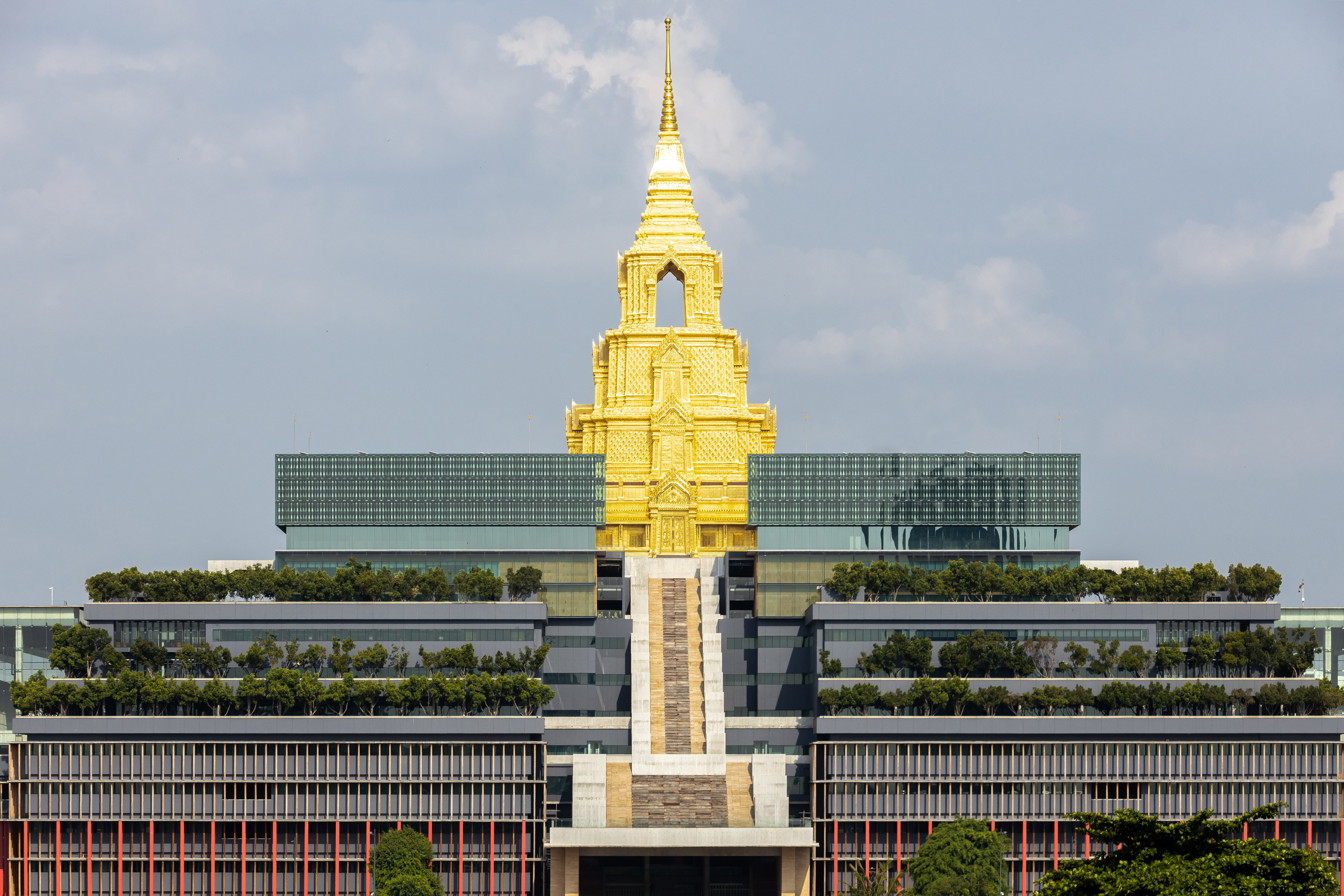
Sappaya-Sapasathan, meeting place of Thailand's legislature, the National Assembly.

Thailand categorizes itself as a constitutional monarchy, the king has little direct power under the constitution and exercises power through the National Assembly, the Council of Ministers, and the Courts in accordance with the 2017 constitution. The king, as the head of state, is the symbol of national identity and unity.

The head of government is the prime minister. The Prime Minister is elected by both houses of the National Assembly. Under section 151 of the constitution, members of the House of Representative constituting at least one-fifth of the existing total Members of the house have the right to submit a vote of no-confidence of a single Minister or the Council of Ministers en masse.

The National Assembly of Thailand, as the bicameral legislative branch of the government, consists of the House of Representatives and the Senate. The House of Representatives is the lower house of the National Assembly and consists of 500 members sitting for four years; 350 members are elected from a constituency basis and 150 members are elected from a party-list proportional representation. The Senate consists of 250 senators that hold a five-year term. Under section 107 of the 2017 constitution, senators are selected from professional and social groups, having the knowledge, expertise, and experience in various areas of society.

== Corruption ==
Corruption has plagued Thailand for much of its modern history, with both the private and government sectors partaking in various forms of corruption. Corruption is embedded within Thai society due to its history and culture, where patronage plays a huge role and those with connections thrive. Research shows that the cost of bureaucratic corruption alone in 2018 amounted up to a 100 billion Thai baht, with state officials at various levels embezzling funds from large and small governmental projects. As of 2018, Corruption Perception Index by Transparency International has ranked Thailand as the 99th least corrupt.

A year after the 2014 Thai coup d'état, the National Council for Peace and Order (NCPO) declared a war on corruption, a common mission by all military dictatorships following the numerous coup in Thailand's history. However, the junta was also entangled with various embarrassing corruption scandals itself.

== Foreign relations ==
Thailand is an active participant in international and regional organizations, and maintains a particularly close and longstanding security relationship with the United States. Thailand's foreign policy includes support for ASEAN and it has developed increasingly close ties with the organisation's other members, Indonesia, Malaysia, the Philippines, Singapore, Brunei, Laos, Cambodia, Burma, and Vietnam. Thailand also attends the annual meetings held by the foreign and economic ministers of the ASEAN nations, including the inaugural East Asia Summit that was held in Kuala Lumpur in December 2005.

Regional cooperation is progressing for Thailand in economic, trade, banking, political, and cultural matters. In 2003, Thailand served as an APEC host and formulated the meeting's theme: "A World of Differences: Partnership for the Future". Supachai Panitchpakdi, the former Deputy Prime Minister of Thailand, served as Director-General of the World Trade Organization (WTO) between 2002 and 2005.

== Political parties and elections ==
=== Voting Rights ===
The issue of voting rights in Thailand is addressed under Section 95 of the 2017 constitution. A person must have the following qualifications in order to vote:

1. Must be of Thai nationality, those that have acquired citizenship through naturalisation must hold the Thai nationality for at least 5 years.
2. Must not be less than 18 years of age on the day of election.
3. Must have their name listed in the household register in the constituency for at least 90 days on the date of election.

=== Results of 2019 Thai General Election ===
The 2019 General Election was held on 24 March 2019; it was the first election held in accordance with the new 2017 constitution and also the first election held since the 2014 coup. The election selected 500 members of the House of Representatives, in which 350 were elected from a constituency basis and 150 were elected from a party-list proportional representation. The National Assembly convened on 5 June to elect the new prime minister, in which the incumbent prime minister and coup leader Prayut Chan-o-cha won.

Party	Popular Votes		Seats		
Party	Votes	%	FPTP	PR	Total
Palang Pracharath Party	8,433,137	23.34	97	19	116
Pheu Thai Party	7,920,630	21.92	136	0	136
Future Forward Party	6,265,950	17.34	31	50	81
Democrat Party	3,947,726	10.92	33	20	53
Bhumjaithai Party	3,732,883	10.33	39	12	51
Thai Liberal Party	826,530	2.29	0	10	10
Chartthaipattana Party	782,031	2.16	6	4	10
New Economics Party	485,664	1.34	0	6	6
Prachachart Party	485,436	1.34	6	1	7
Puea Chat Party	419,393	1.16	0	5	5
Action Coalition for Thailand	416,324	1.15	1	4	5
Chart Pattana Party	252,044	0.70	1	2	3
Thai Local Power Party	213,129	0.59	0	3	3
Thai Forest Conservation Party	136,597	0.38	0	2	2
Thai People Power Party	81,733	0.23	0	1	1
Thai Nation Power Party	73,871	0.20	0	1	1
People Progressive Party	69,417	0.19	0	1	1
Palang Thai Rak Thai Party	60,840	0.17	0	1	1
Thai Civilized Party	60,421	0.17	0	1	1
Prachaniyom Party	56,617	0.16	0	1	1
Thai Teachers for People Party	56,339	0.16	0	1	1
Thai People Justice Party	47,848	0.13	0	1	1
People Reform Party	45,508	0.13	0	1	1
Thai Citizens Power Party	44,766	0.12	0	1	1
New Democracy Party	39,792	0.11	0	1	1
New Palangdharma Party	35,533	0.10	0	1	1
Thairaktham Party	33,748	0.09	0	0	0
Puea Pandin Party	31,307	0.09	0	0	0
New Alternative Party	29,607	0.08	0	0	0
Paradonphab Party	27,799	0.08	0	0	0
Democratic Force Party	26,617	0.07	0	0	0
Phue Khon Thai Party	26,598	0.07	0	0	0
Thai Power Builds the Nation Party	23,059	0.06	0	0	0
Green Party	22,662	0.06	0	0	0
The Land of Dharma Party	21,463	0.06	0	0	0
Mahachon Party	17,867	0.05	0	0	0
Social Power Party	17,683	0.05	0	0	0
The Farmer Network of Thailand Party	17,664	0.05	0	0	0
Thaen Khun Phaendin Party	17,112	0.05	0	0	0
Siam Development Party	16,839	0.05	0	0	0
Phuea Tham Party	15,365	0.04	0	0	0
Ruam Jai Thai Party	13,457	0.04	0	0	0
Klong Thai Party	12,946	0.04	0	0	0
Phungluang Party	12,576	0.03	0	0	0
Thai Network Party	12,268	0.03	0	0	0
Thai Citizen Party	11,839	0.03	0	0	0
Thai Population Party	11,043	0.03	0	0	0
Thai Ethnic Party	9,757	0.03	0	0	0
Palang Thai Rak Chart Party	9,685	0.03	0	0	0
Power of Faith Party	9,561	0.03	0	0	0
New Aspiration Party	9,074	0.03	0	0	0
Phuea Thai Pattana Party	8,095	0.02	0	0	0
Thinkakhao Party	6,799	0.02	0	0	0
Thai Teacher Power Party	6,398	0.02	0	0	0
Thai Morality Party	5,942	0.02	0	0	0
Glang Party	5,447	0.02	0	0	0
Thai Social Democratic Party	5,334	0.01	0	0	0
Commoners' Party	5,321	0.01	0	0	0
Foundational Party	4,786	0.01	0	0	0
Powerful Love Party	4,624	0.01	0	0	0
Palang Pandinthong Party	4,568	0.01	0	0	0
Thai Rung Rueng Party	4,237	0.01	0	0	0
Bhumphalangkasettrakonthai Party	3,535	0.01	0	0	0
Rak Thong Thin Thai	3,254	0.01	0	0	0
Thai Power Labour Party	2,951	0.01	0	0	0
Commoner Party of Thailand	2,353	0.01	0	0	0
Thai Dee Power Party	2,536	0.01	0	0	0
Cooperative Power Party	2,343	0.01	0	0	0
Phue Cheevitmai Party	1,595	0.00	0	0	0
Thailand Development Party	1,079	0.00	0	0	0
Phue Sahagon Thai Party	905	0.00	0	0	0
People Vote Party	791	0.00	0	0	0
Thai Rubber Party	610	0.00	0	0	0
People for People Party	562	0.00	0	0	0
Raks Tham	446	0.00	0	0	0
Kasikornthai Party	183	0.00	0	0	0
Thai Future Party	198	0.00	0	0	0
Thai Worker Party	-	-	-	-	-
Thai Save the Nation Party	-	-	-	-	-
Thai Friend Party	-	-	-	-	-
Thailand Sport Party	-	-	-	-	-
None of the above	605,392	1.68	–	–	–
Invalid/Null	2,130,327	-	–	–	–
Total Votes	38,268,366	100	350	150	500
Registered Voters	51,239,638	74.69	–	–	–
Sources: Election Commission of Thailand

== Political history of the democratic era ==
=== Transition to democracy after 1932 ===
Following the Siamese revolution of 1932, which imposed constitutional limits on the monarchy, Thai politics were dominated for around fifty years by a military and bureaucratic elite, with the support of businessmen and entrepreneurs. Changes of government were affected primarily by a long series of mostly bloodless coups.

The popular uprising of 14 October 1973 resulted in the end of the ruling military dictatorship of anti-communist Thanom Kittikachorn. Notably, it highlighted the growing influence of Thai university students in politics. Only three years later, left-wing movements were cracked down by the extremely violent suppression from right wings and ultra royalists in the 6 October 1976 massacre event, following by a coup to strengthen the monarchy and military status in the Cold War period, including increase of lèse-majesté law jail terms.

Beginning with a brief experiment in democracy during the mid-1980s, led by Prem Tinsulanonda, civilian democratic political institutions slowly gained greater authority, culminating in 1988 when Chatichai Choonhavan, leader of the Chart Thai Party, assumed office as the country's first democratically elected prime minister in more than a decade. Three years later, another bloodless coup, 1991 Thai coup d'état ended his term and the military junta National Peace Keeping Council was formed.

Shortly thereafter, the royally appointed Anand Panyarachun, a businessman and former diplomat, headed a largely civilian interim government and promised to hold elections in the near future. However, following inconclusive March 1992 Thai general election, former army commander Suchinda Kraprayoon was appointed prime minister. Thais, more than 200,000 people led by Chamlong Srimuang reacted to the appointment by demanding an end to military influence in government, but demonstrations were violently suppressed by the military in Black May events. An estimated 52 to 100 protesters were killed, 696 were injured, and 175 had "disappeared", it had not been concluded until today. Shortly, Suchinda regime received sweeping amnesty, signed by Bhumibol Adulyadej.

Domestic and international reactions to the violence forced Suchinda to resign, and the nation once again turned to Anand, who was appointed interim prime minister until new elections were held in September 1992. In the September 1992 elections, political parties that had opposed the military in May 1992 won by a narrow majority and Chuan Leekpai, a leader of the Democrat Party, became prime minister at the head of a five-party coalition.

Following the defection of a coalition partner, Chuan dissolved parliament in May 1995, and the Chart Thai Party won the largest number of parliamentary seats in the subsequent election. Party leader Banharn Silpa-archa became prime minister, but held the office for little more than a year. Following elections held in November 1996, Chavalit Youngchaiyudh formed a coalition government and became prime minister. However, the onset of the Asian financial crisis caused a loss of confidence in the Chavalit government and forced him to hand over power to Chuan Leekpai in November 1997.

Chuan formed a coalition government based on the themes of economic crisis management. The 1997 constitution was introduced as the first constitution to be drafted by a popularly elected Constitutional Drafting Assembly, hence was popularly called the People's Constitution. The 1997 constitution created a bicameral legislature. For the first time in Thai history, both houses were directly elected.

=== 2001–2006, Thaksin Shinawatra ===
In the January 2001 elections, telecommunications multimillionaire Thaksin Shinawatra, who had relations with the 1990s junta, and his Thai Rak Thai Party (TRT) won an overwhelming victory on a populist platform of economic growth and development.

Thaksin also narrowly avoided (8:7) a guilty verdict in the Constitutional Court, where he was charged by the Board of Anti-Corruption of hiding shares worth hundreds of millions of baht. A decade later, a Supreme Court ruling in another case accepted the possibility of bribery in the Constitutional Court case.

After absorbing several smaller parties, TRT gained an absolute majority in the lower house of parliament, controlling 296 of 500 seats. In a cabinet reshuffle of October 2002, the Thaksin administration further put its stamp on the government. A package of bureaucratic reform legislation created six new ministries in an effort to streamline the bureaucratic process and increase efficiency and accountability.

The general election held on 6 February 2005 resulted in another landslide victory for Thaksin and TRT, which controlled 374 seats in parliament's lower house. Thaksin's populist policies found great favour in rural areas. Thaksin introduced government programs which greatly benefited rural areas of the country. These programs included debt relief for farmers still reeling from the Asian financial crisis and a new healthcare program that brought coverage to all Thais for 30 baht per visit (equivalent to about US$1). During the 2013–2014 Thai political crisis older residents of the Baan Dong Yaang village in Udon Thani Province stated: "Before Thaksin, no politicians came here. Thaksin understood our situation and helped us."

Despite the majority and surging popularity among rural Thais, Thaksin came under severe questioning for selling telecommunication shares to Temasek, a Singapore investor, for about 70,000 million baht without paying any tax. More complex and high-level corruption and conspiracies were discovered and exposed by Sonthi Limthongkul, Manager Media Group owner, who reached the middle class in the capital and the cities through the only small satellite and internet media channel, ASTV.

Thaksin refused to publicly answer the questions of the People's Alliance for Democracy (PAD), a large group of middle class Thais and a coalition of anti-Thaksin protesters led by Sonthi Limthongkul. Due to an inability to clear himself of the corruption allegations, Thaksin's regime fell apart during public protests led by PAD, which led to widespread calls for his resignation and impeachment.

PAD gathered in Bangkok and demanded that Thaksin resign as prime minister so that the king could directly appoint someone else. Thaksin refused and protests continued for weeks. Thaksin consequently dissolved parliament on 24 February 2006 and called a snap election for 2 April 2006. The election was boycotted by the opposition parties, leading to unopposed TRT candidates for 38 seats failing to obtain the necessary quorum of 20 per cent of eligible votes. As the Thai constitution requires all seats to be filled from the beginning of parliament, this produced a constitutional crisis. After floating several suggestions on 4 April 2006, Thaksin announced that he would step down as prime minister as soon as parliament had selected a successor. In a televised speech to senior judges, King Bhumibol requested that they execute their duty justly.

Criminal charges and allegations of administrative abuse cases were brought against the Election Committee. The courts voided the election results, jailed the committee for abuse of power, and ordered a new round of elections for 15 October 2006. Thaksin continued to work as caretaker prime minister.

Civil movements in Thailand were active in the 2000s, with some groups perceiving the Thaksin government as authoritarian, citing extrajudicial killings in his war on drugs, special security laws passed by the administration, and the government's increasingly hardline responses to the insurgency in the southern provinces. Thaksin's government was facing mounting opposition from the urban middle classes, while continuing to remain popular in the predominantly poor and rural north and northeastern regions. However, the most severe critic of Thaksin seemed to be Sondhi Limthongkul, a media tycoon and former colleague.

=== 2006 coup ===
While Thaksin was in New York City to make a speech at UN Headquarters, the military seized power on 19 September 2006.

The Council for Democratic Reform under Constitutional Monarchy (CDRM) led by General Sonthi Boonyaratglin was formed. Political activities were banned by the junta after the coup on 19 September 2006. The 1997 constitution was abrogated, although most of the institutions of government remained intact. A new constitution was drafted and promulgated in late-2007.

A month after the coup, an interim civilian government was formed, including an appointed House of Representatives from a variety of professions and an appointed Constitutional Court. Freedom of speech was restored.

During 2006 and 2007, organized underground terrorist activities took place, including the burning numerous schools in rural areas of the north and the northeast of Thailand and the planting of bombs in ten locations in Bangkok, the latter of which killed and injured several people on New Year's Eve in 2006.

A national referendum for the 2007 constitution was called by the military and the 2007 constitution was accepted by the majority of the voters. The junta promised a democratic general election, which was finally held on 23 December 2007, 16 months after the coup.

The Constitutional Court unanimously dissolved the populist Thai Rak Thai Party following punishment according to the 1997 constitution, banning 111 TRT members from politics for five years.

The military drafted a controversial new constitution following allegations of Thaksin's corruption and abuse of power. This constitution was particularly designed to increase control of corruption and of conflicts of interests of politicians while decreasing the previously strengthened authority of the government. A national referendum accepted the 2007 constitution, although there was significant disapproval in Thaksin's stronghold, the north and northeast.

On 23 December 2007, a national parliamentary election was held, based on the new constitution, and the People's Power Party (Thai Rak Thai's and Thaksin's proxy party), led by former Bangkok governor Samak Sundaravej, seized the reins of government. Thailand's new parliament convened on 21 January 2008.

The People's Power Party (PPP), or Thaksin's proxy party, gained the majority, with just under half of the total seats in parliament, and won the general election by a solid margin after five minor parties joined it to form a coalition government.

A complaint was filed against PPP in the Thai Supreme Court, charging PPP of being the TRT nominee party. Moreover, in 2008, one of its leading members was charged with electoral fraud. The Election Committee also proposed that the PPP should be dissolved due to the violation of the constitution.

==== Red shirts, yellow shirts ====
The so-called "Red Shirts" got their start as supporters of deposed former Prime Minister Thaksin Shinawatra. Red shirts transferred their support to Thailand's ruling Pheu Thai party led by his sister, Yingluck Shinawatra. In general, red shirts see attempts by the urban and military elite to control Thai politics as a threat to democracy. The "yellow shirts" represent those opposed to Thaksin. They were the force behind the street protests that led to the 2006 coup. The yellow shirts are a loose grouping of royalists, ultra-nationalists, and the urban middle class opposed to Thaksin and overarching democratic rule by a rural majority.

=== 2008 political crisis ===
In 2008, Thailand saw increasing political turmoil, with the PPP government facing pressure to step down amid mounting civil disobedience and unrest led by PAD. The conflict centred on the constitution. The PPP supported the amendment of the 2007 constitution, while anti-government protesters considered it to be a political amnesty for Thaksin and his followers.

The anti-government protesters were, said, mostly better educated, more affluent, urban Thais criticizing a Western-style electoral system corrupted by rich politicians. Thaksin was accused of buying votes, bureaucrats, policemen, military officers, and even political factions. Thaksin became the example of the businessman autocrat, launching so-called populist projects, some of which were controversial, such as the war on drugs. Hundreds of killings and murder cases noted by the police were said by them to be merely fighting among the drug traffickers, but no further investigation ever occurred. The judicial process was seen as useless; instead, decisive justice was seen to be in the hands of the police.

As the anti-government movement had criticized Thaksin as an example of a corrupt politician, it discredited the election system, suggesting at once a system in which part of the representatives in the national assembly would be chosen by certain professions or social groups.

Anti-Thaksin protesters were vastly outnumbered by Thaksin's supporters in the rural majority, who delivered to his party two resounding election victories. Their loyalty was rewarded by generous social and economic welfare programs. The anti-government forces were well-organized, and criticized the behind-the-scenes support of the military, the country's most influential institution, seeing Thaksin supported by anti-royalists, former revolutionaries, and ex-communists aiming at regime change.

Samak Sundaravej was elected prime minister of the first government under the 2007 constitution.

Samak Sundaravej, an articulate politician, acknowledged being the "nominee" of fugitive Thaksin Shinawatra. Samak Sundaravej's position in power, however, did not put an end to the conflict. People claimed that Thaksin still influenced Thai politics even though he was in exile.

In 1973, he ran a prominent month-long propaganda campaign, accusing democratic student movements of being communist rebels, traitors and spies. The event ended in a massacre of hundreds of students at Thammasat University on 14 October 1973, and a further military coup was conducted, giving him the interior minister position in the junta. In 1976 there was another massacre at the university. Thai military personnel, police and others, were seen shooting at protesters at the university. Many were killed and many survivors were abused.

Prime Minister Samak held daily national state television broadcasts with his own political messages. These were not well received by PAD. NBT, the National Broadcasting Television, the state-owned media enterprise, was openly used to counter the PAD's message, which emphasizes the overturning of the current democratic system.

Former PM Thaksin had welcomed offers to come back to Thailand in February 2008 to face corruption charges and to get close control of the PPP, successor of his Thai Rak Thai Party.

The opposition forced a no-confidence vote on a constitutional amendment which may have resulted in the reinstatement of Thaksin's reputation. The failure to address dramatically rising food and energy prices, and a temple dispute with Cambodia damaged the coalition government's reputation.

Street protests led by PAD, the major opposition movement, began in late-May after the ruling party agreed to amend the constitution. Their main objective was to block any constitutional amendment aimed chiefly at reinstating Thaksin's reputation and saving the PPP from dissolution after one of its leaders was charged with electoral fraud.

Another of PAD's objectives was to support the courts and the judicial system in hearing Thaksin's cases. While PM Samak has been successful in controlling the police and civil service, various courts remain independent and issued several independent verdicts.

The Constitutional Court concluded that PPP's second-in-command, Yongyuth Tiyapairat, who pressured local officers to support his party in the previous election, would subject the party to dissolution. The Administrative Court also ruled that his government seriously violated the constitution and might have prejudiced national sovereignty in negotiating over the sovereignty of territory immediately adjacent to Preah Vihear, a temple in Cambodia. The case brought the resignation of his first foreign minister, Nopadon Patama. Several other ministers found wrongfully informing the Anti-corruption Board or Election Governing Board of important information, were discharged when this was discovered.

Previously Thaksin and Pojaman's three lawyers were caught red-handed attempting to bribe Supreme Court judges and were given jail sentences. That was an ominous sign for Thaksin. Later a criminal court returned a verdict of tax evasion against Pojaman. He was to be jailed for three years. Days later, Thaksin and Pojaman jumped bail and issued a statement from London announcing through Thai TV his decision to seek political asylum in the UK in an attempt to avoid what he called "biased" treatment under Thailand's current judicial system.

Thaksin and his family fled to Great Britain on 11 August 2008, to apply for political asylum after his wife was convicted of tax evasion.

PM Samak Sundaravej, through his parliament, was able to complete budget bills for mega-projects which cost so much that the King of Thailand spoke out in protest and to thank the head of the Bank of Thailand (under threats from the government) for warning that the country was on the brink of disaster because of high expenditures.

On 26 August 2008, 30,000 protesters, led by PAD, occupied Sundaravej's Government House compound in central Bangkok, forcing he and his advisers to work at Don Mueang International Airport. Riot police entered the occupied compound and delivered a court order for the eviction of the PAD protesters. Chamlong Srimuang, a leader of PAD, ordered 45 PAD guards to break into the main government building on Saturday. Three regional airports were closed for a short period and 35 trains between Bangkok and the provinces were canceled. Protesters raided the Phuket International Airport tarmac on the resort island of Phuket Province resulting to 118 flights canceled or diverted, affecting 15,000 passengers.

Protesters also blocked the entrances of the airports in Krabi and Hat Yai (which were later re-opened). Police issued arrest warrants for Sondhi Limthongkul and eight other PAD leaders on charges of insurrection, conspiracy, unlawful assembly and refusing orders to disperse. Meanwhile, General Anupong Paochinda stated: "The army will not stage a coup. The political crisis should be resolved by political means". Samak and the ruling coalition called for an urgent parliamentary debate and session for 31 August.

PM Samak Sundaravej tried using legal means involving civil charges, criminal charges, and police action to remove PAD protesters from government offices on 29 August. However, PAD managed to get temporary relief from the courts enabling them to legally continue the siege of the government office.

One person died and 40 people were wounded in a clash which occurred when the DAAD (NohPohKoh) protesters, supported by Thaksin and the PPP moved toward PAD at about 03:00, 2 September without adequate police intervention.

By the second half of September 2008, PM Samak Sundaravej was the subject of several court cases for his past actions. He faced an appeals court judgement of slander and a pending ruling from the Constitutional Court as to whether he had a conflict of interest by being a private employee while holding the premiership. The Anti-Corruption Board contemplated bringing a charge of abuse of power in the Preah Vihear case to the Constitutional Court. These legal difficulties ended PM Samak's political role. Ex-PM Thaksin and Pojaman also faced verdicts from the Supreme Court.

People Power Party's deputy spokesman Kuthep Suthin Klangsang, on 12 September 2008 announced: "Samak has accepted his nomination for prime minister. Samak said he is confident that parliament will find him fit for office, and that he is happy to accept the post. A majority of party members voted on Thursday to reappoint Samak. Samak is the leader of our party so he is the best choice." Despite objections from its five coalition partners, the PPP, in an urgent meeting, unanimously decided to renominate Samak Sundaravej. Five coalition parties, namely Chart Thai, Matchima Thipataya, Pracharaj, Puea Pandin, and Ruam Jai Thai Chart Pattana, unanimously agreed to support the PPP to set up the new government and vote for the person who should be nominated as the new prime minister. Chart Thai deputy leader Somsak Prissananantakul and Ruam Jai Thai Chart Pattana leader Chettha Thanajaro said the next prime minister was nominated. Caretaker prime minister Somchai Wongsawat said PPP secretary-general Surapong Suebwonglee would notify the five parties who the PPP nominated, to take office again. Some lawmakers, however, said they would propose an alternate candidate. Meanwhile, Thailand's army chief General Anupong Paochinda said he backed the creation of a national unity government that would include all the country's parties, and he also asked for the lifting of a state of emergency that Samak imposed on 2 September.

Embattled Samak Sundaravej abandoned his bid to regain the premiership, and he also resigned from the PPP's leadership. Meanwhile, PPP's chief party spokesmen, Kudeb Saikrachang and Kan Thiankaew, announced on 13 September that caretaker prime minister Somchai Wongsawat, caretaker justice minister Sompong Amornwiwat, and PPP Secretary-General Surapong Suebwonglee were PPP's candidates for premiership. However, Suriyasai Katasila of People's Alliance for Democracy (a group of royalist businessmen, academics and activists) vowed to continue its occupation of Government House if a PPP candidate were nominated: "We would accept anyone as prime minister, as long as he is not from the People's Power Party."

On 14 September the state of emergency was lifted. The ruling People Power Party, on 15 September 2008, named Somchai Wongsawat, candidate for prime minister to succeed Samak Sundaravej. The PPP will endorse Somchai, and his nomination will be set for a parliamentary vote on Wednesday. Meanwhile, the Supreme Court ruled on Wednesday in a corruption case against Thaksin and his wife, to be promulgated after the parliament vote for the new prime minister.

On 4 October 2008, Chamlong Srimuang and rally organiser Chaiwat Sinsuwongse of the People's Alliance for Democracy were detained by the Thai police led by Col. Sarathon Pradit, by virtue of 27 August arrest warrant for insurrection, conspiracy, illegal assembly, and refusing orders to disperse (treason) against him and eight other protest leaders. At Government House, Sondhi Limthongkul, however, stated demonstrations would continue: "I am warning you, the government and police, that you are putting fuel on the fire. Once you arrest me, thousands of people will tear you apart." Srimuang's wife, Ying Siriluck visited him at the Border Patrol Police Region 1, Pathum Thani. Other PAD members still wanted by police included Sondhi, activist MP Somkiat Pongpaibul, and PAD leaders Somsak Kosaisuk and Pibhop Dhongchai.

On 7 October 2008, Deputy Prime Minister Chavalit Yongchaiyudh resigned and admitted partial responsibility for violence due to police tear gas clearance of the blockade of the parliament, causing injuries to 116 protesters, 21 seriously. His resignation letter stated: "Since this action did not achieve what I planned, I want to show my responsibility for this operation." After being dispersed, 5,000 demonstrators returned and blocked all four entries to the parliament building.

The protesters attempted to hold 320 MPs and senators as hostages inside the parliament building, cutting off the power supply, and forcing Somchai Wongsawat to escape by jumping a back fence after his policy address. But other trapped MPs failed to leave and flee from the mob. The siege on the area beside the near prime minister's office forced the government to transfer its activities to Don Mueang Airport.

On 26 November 2008, the Asian Human Rights Commission (AHRC) issued a statement saying that the current crisis was a watershed moment for democracy and rule of law in Thailand. It contains harsh critique of PAD and the criminal justice system of Thailand.

=== 2009–2010 protests and crackdowns ===
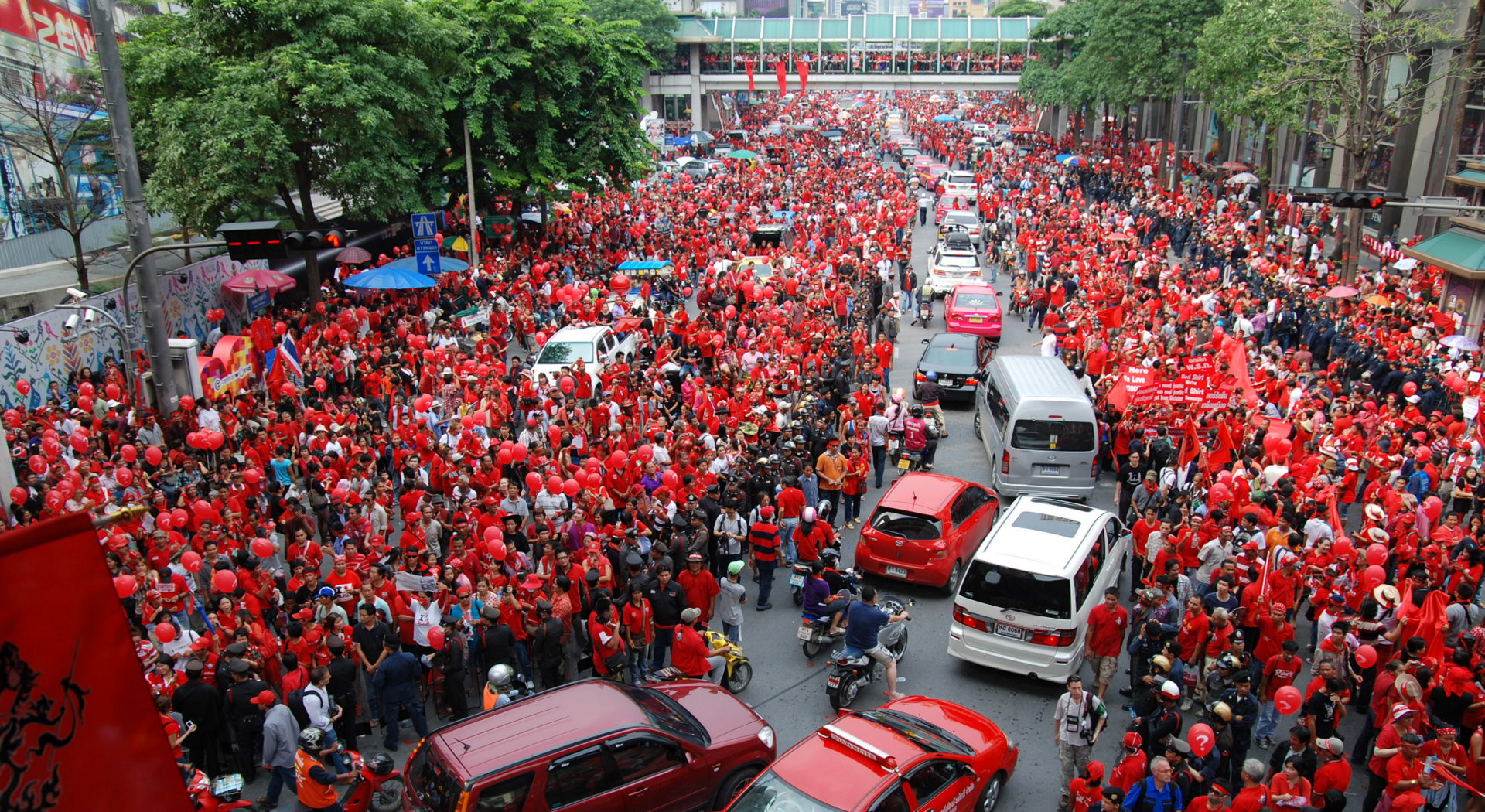
United Front for Democracy Against Dictatorship, Red Shirts, protest in 2010

Abhisit's rise to power was controversial and opposed from the beginning. In April 2009, anti-government protesters, known as "red shirts", began a demonstration aimed at the resignation of the prime minister and fresh elections. The major site of the demonstration was Bangkok. From 8 April, the demonstrators spread their activities to significant locations such as major intersections. Streets were blocked and barricaded. The demonstration took place at the same time as the ASEAN summit in Pattaya. Demonstrators moved there to protest, aiming at disrupting the summit. Protesters stormed the site of the summit, causing its cancellation.

In Bangkok, the protest became fiercer because of the arrest of the leaders of the Pattaya protest. Protesters blocked the entrances of the Criminal Court, calling for the release of their leaders. Prime Minister Abhisit, at The Ministry of Interior, declared a state of emergency. Protesters blocked the entrance of the ministry, to seize the premier and other ministers. However, the premier escaped. The government began to deploy anti-riot troops. Armored vehicles were deployed in downtown Bangkok. Anti-riot actions took place in the early morning of the next day. Anti-riot troops, armed with shields, batons, and M-16s with live ammo, started dispersing and shooting protesters on Bangkok's streets.

Protesters charged that the government was killing protesters. The government denied the charge. Although two bodies were found, the government found no evidence that it was involved in the killings. On major avenues and streets, burning buses were seen, as well as wounded people were carried to the hospitals, but the government reported no serious cases.

By the afternoon of 14 April, the military controlled all main streets. The leaders of the protest decided to suspend their activities. Thai politics after the pro-Thaksin protest has so far been the stage of the two opposing factions: the Democrat Party-led government allied with their coalition partners, who also have the tacit support of the PAD, the military, and the police, against the Thaksin loyalists, the United Front for Democracy Against Dictatorship (UDD). Both sides have claimed the fighting as the struggle for democracy and the nation.

==== Resolution to conflict ====
On 3 May the Thai Prime Minister announced he was willing to hold elections on 14 November should the opposition red shirts accept the offer. The following day red shirt leaders accepted the proposal to leave the occupied parts of Bangkok in return for an election on the scheduled date.

However, one week later, 10 May, protesters had yet to disband despite accepting the road map proposed by the prime minister for early elections. They placed new demands upon the prime minister that Deputy Prime Minister Suthep Thaugsuban, who was in charge of security operations during the clash of 10 April, must first turn himself in for prosecution before they dispersed.

On 11 May, Suthep presented himself to the Department of Special Investigation. The red shirt protesters, however, were not satisfied and demanded Suthep be formally charged instead by police. The red shirts failure to disperse was taken as a decline of the conciliatory road map and Prime Minister Abhisit's proposal of early parliamentary elections were withdrawn. This was followed by a warning issued from the prime minister that protesters must disperse or face imminent military action. The red shirts led another protest on 19 May. The army killed over 90 protesters in the ensuing military crackdown. Army tactics were heavily criticised for failing to abide by international standards and using lethal force on unarmed protesters. At least six people including nurses and medics were shot by snipers inside a Buddhist temple set up as a safe area.

Between 2001 and 2011, Isan's GDP per capita more than doubled to US$1,475. Over the same period, GDP in the Bangkok area soared from US$7,900 to nearly US$13,000.

=== 2013 political crisis ===
Following the announcement of a proposed amnesty bill by the Yingluck government, protests resurfaced in October 2013. The bill would allow former prime minister Thaksin to re-enter Thailand. Protesters perceived the Yingluck administration as corrupt, illegitimate, and a proxy for her brother. The protest movement was led by Suthep Thaugsuban and was supported by the People's Democratic Reform Committee (PDRC).

Prime Minister Yingluck dissolved the Thai parliament following the recommencement of protests and announced a new election in accordance with the Thai constitution. The constitution states that elections must be held 45 to 60 days from the date that parliament is dissolved. The protest movement opposed the election announcement and the PDRC stated that it would boycott the process, with Suthep calling for the appointment of an unelected council to lead the country until reforms can be implemented. Protesters marched to the Thai-Japanese sports stadium, the venue of the registration process, on 22 December 2013 to block the work of the Election Commission (EC).

Protesters at the Thai-Japanese sports stadium clashed with police on 26 December 2013, resulting in two fatalities (one police officer was killed by a live bullet fired by a protester). Protesters armed themselves with sling shots and wore gas masks to fight with police, and around 200 people were injured. Due to the escalation in violence, the EC released a statement in which it urged the government to consider postponing the elections. The government explained that it was unable to change the date of the election, but remained open to discussions with protesters.

In his response to the media on 27 December 2013, Thailand's army chief General Prayut Chan-o-cha did not rule out the possibility of a military coup, stating, "Whether it is going to happen, time will tell. We don't want to overstep the bounds of our authority. We don't want to use force. We try to use peaceful means, talks and meetings to solve the problem." During the same period, an arrest warrant was issued for Suthep by authorities who cited insurrection as the reason, but police did not act on the order for fear of further provocation.

Following the announcement of a 60-day emergency decree on 21 January 2014, Yingluck met with the EC on 27 January to discuss the possibility of postponing the election due to the latter's fear of violence on the day of the election. However, following a three-hour meeting, caretaker Deputy Prime Minister Pongthep Thepkanchana informed media that the polling date remained unchanged. Election commissioner Somchai Srisuthiyakorn stated that the EC would organise the 2 February vote to the best of its ability, including the enactment of measures to prevent violence and the staging of a second round of elections to accommodate voters hindered during the inaugural voting stage. During the meeting at the Army Club, an anti-government protester sustained a gunshot wound; the gunman was arrested.

The smooth completion of the 2 February election did not resolve Thailand's political situation, as issues of continuing relevancy remained of concern to the caretaker government: firstly, due to protester blockades, 28 constituencies failed to register candidates; secondly, the constitution required at least 475 filled seats, or 95 per cent of the total number of seats, and the problems caused by protesters meant that this target was not reached—the EC, which believes that the final result will fall three seats short, explained that it would be necessary to hold by-elections over several months in problematic constituencies until all 500 members of the parliament's lower house were selected. In the 2011 elections, a 75 per cent voter turnout rate was registered.

On 29 January, the Thai Army announced its support of the CMPO operation to protect the election. Deputy army spokesman Winthai Suvari provided details of the deployment of additional military personnel in areas of particular concern and a joint operation with the CMPO to ensure the safety of state officials and others. The army's other key responsibilities will involve providing medical aid in areas close to protest sites, as well as traffic co-ordination duties in such areas. Assistant national police chief Amnart Unartngarm stated that its 200,000 police officers, plus 1,450 rapid-deployment units, would guard 93,535 polling stations in 76 provinces and Bangkok.

=== 2014 Coup ===
On 22 May 2014, the military staged a coup. Prayut Chan-o-cha quickly cracked down on dissent. He put in place controls on the media, imposed Internet censorship, declared a nationwide curfew, banned gatherings of five or more persons and arrested politicians and anti-coup activists, some of whom were charged with sedition and tried in military courts. On 26 May, King Bhumibol Adulyadej endorsed the coup, formally appointing Prayut to "take charge of public administration" as of 24 May. On 22 July 2014, Prayut issued an interim constitution granting himself an amnesty for leading the coup and new sweeping powers. The junta legislature unanimously voted Prayut, the sole candidate, as the new prime minister. The formal appointment was made on 24 August 2014, in which King Bhumibol Adulyadej officially endorsed Prayut as prime minister. Prayut activated Article 44 of the interim constitution. It authorises Prayut to issue "any order to suppress" any act that "undermines public peace and order or national security, the monarchy". Political rights had been a free fall since Prayut took control. On 13 October 2016, Bhumibol died; King Vajiralongkorn became the new monarch. On 16 July 2017, Prayut and military junta legislator issued the Crown Property law, making King Vajiralongkorn in control of the world's biggest royal fortune.

=== 2017 military junta constitution ===
Under the 2017 constitution, the senate was appointed by the NCPO and would select the prime minister alongside the House of Representatives. Political parties were able to nominate anyone as their prime minister candidate, including non-party members, which led commentators to believe that Prayut planned to be selected as prime minister with votes from 250 senators and MPs from pro-junta parties, namely the Phalang Pracharat Party, which has close ties to the junta and is led by Prayut's cabinet ministers,

After the 2019 election, Prayut Chan-o-cha became prime minister, defeating Thanathorn Juangroongruangkit of the anti-junta Future Forward Party 500 votes to 244, in which 249 of 500 votes came from a near-unanimous body of senators appointed by the junta (NCPO).

=== 2020–2021 protests ===
The protests began in early 2020 with demonstrations against the government of Prime Minister Prayut Chan-o-cha. They later expanded to include the unprecedented demands for reform of the Thai monarchy. The protests were initially triggered by the dissolution of the Future Forward Party (FFP) in late February 2020 which was critical of Prayut, the changes to the Thai constitution in 2017 and the country's political landscape that it gave rise to.

In November 2021, The Constitutional Court ruled that demands for reform of the Thai monarchy have abused of the rights and freedoms and harmed the state's security and ordered an end to all movements, declaring unconstitutional. It has been likened to judicial coup.

=== Since 2022 ===
In September 2022, Thailand's Constitutional Court ruled that Prime Minister Prayuth Chan-ocha can stay in office. The opposition had challenged him, because the new constitution limits the term for prime minister as a total period of eight years in office. The Constitutional Court's ruling was that his term in office began in April 2017, simultaneously with the new constitution, although General Prayuth had ruled as the leader of the government since the 2014 military coup.

In May 2023, Thailand's reformist opposition, the progressive Move Forward Party (MFP) and the populist Pheu Thai Party, won the general election, meaning the royalist-military parties that supported Prime Minister Prayuth Chan-ocha lost power. On 22 August 2023, Srettha Thavisin of the populist Pheu Thai party, became Thailand's new prime minister, while the Pheu Thai party's billionaire figurehead Thaksin Shinawatra returned to Thailand after years in self-imposed exile.

== Ideas of power ==
According to Sopranzetti, who studied Thai ideas of power, in politics, power is seen in terms of moral authority (barami) and amoral power (amnat).

=== Barami ===
Barami is a form of power in moral people. It comes from karmic merit.

Barami can be loosely translated as "charismatic power" too. Despite its cosmological roots, barami is important in politics. Since a person's possession of barami could be the basis for their claim to power, their lack of it could be the rallying point for a person's enemies to dispose of them.

Throughout the Bangkok period (1783–present), the representation and maintenance of one's barami is a crucial means by which political and social power is maintained or seized, according to Veal.

Political power in Thailand is often strongly associated with the charismatic power of barami.

This has implications for business and political institutions, one being the notion that "the truth is only accessible to spiritually powerful people". For example, in 2011, a newspaper wrote that a Lieutenant said that only those with enough merit (bun) should have the privilege of reading top-secret documents. Since there is an association, in political institutions, between barami, truth, and political participation; in the 1970s, unpopular politicians were compared with animals low on the biological hierarchy—such as monitor lizards and water buffalo—to portray them as having less of and residing farther away from barami.

As moral authority, barami is based "in the spiritual world of Buddhism", the consequence of the merit of previous lives and earned through good deeds. Barami can be lost (sia barami) when holders of barami don't live up to their demands of their character.

For example, Phibun's political regime had moral legitimacy (and barami) because Phibun had the reputation of duty to the nation; Sarit's regime had barami because Sarit had the reputation of defence of the monarchy and promotion of national development; Prem's regime had legitimacy because Prem had the reputation of trusted service and discourse on "good people"; and Thaksin's political regime had barami because Thaksin had the reputation of popular support.

=== Amnat ===
Amnat is a form of authority that comes from a formal position, according to Sopranzetti. It is not intrinsic. Amnat can also be translated as "power," raw amoral power used for either good or evil, Chachavalpongpun said.

As raw power, amnat is "temporal", through reaching a position of power. Amnat is the power of superiors over subordinates. Amnat can be lost (sia amnat) when used without a form of moral legitimacy, or the support of barami. Fear, in this context, can be contested.

For example, amnat was used in politics in order to enact policy, to promote moral precepts in a top-down way, to eliminate opponents, to not be constrained by constitution, and to promote and demote subordinates in an arbitrary manner.

== See also ==
- Thailand
- History of Thailand
- Media in Thailand
- Constitution of Thailand
