= Udom Sittiwirattham =

Thai jurist

- อุดม สิทธิวิรัชธรรม

Justice of the Constitutional Court of Thailand
- Incumbent
- Assumed office 1 April 2020

Personal details
- Born: 22 November 1954 (age 71)

Udom Sittiwirattham (Thai: อุดม สิทธิวิรัชธรรม, RTGS: Udom Sitthiwirattham; born 22 November 1954) is a Thai jurist serving as a Justice of the Constitutional Court of Thailand since 2020.

== Early life and education ==
Udom received a Bachelor of Laws from Ramkhamhaeng University, and a Master of Laws from Chulalongkorn University.

== Career ==
He previously served as a presiding judge of the Supreme Court of Thailand, overseeing appeals and petitions.

=== Constitutional Court ===
Udom's appointment was given royal endorsement by King Vajiralongkorn on 1 April 2020 and was published in the Royal Gazette on 6 April 2020.

==== Move Forward Party dissolution ====
On 7 August 2024, the Constitutional Court issued a dissolution resolution to the Move Forward Party, unanimously voting that the party sought to take control of the country through unconstitutional means, and 8 to 1 voting that that party had acted in ways that were hostile to Thailand's constitutional monarchy.

==== People's Party fundraising comments ====
After the Move Forward Party was reorganized as the People's Party, Udom was quoted at a 15 August 2024 seminar in Surat Thani as saying "Frankly speaking, they should thank me for dissolving the party. I helped them collect as much as 20 million baht in donations," referring to the People's Party's fundraising.

Udom's comments were criticized by Members of Parliament, including from the People's Party and Pheu Thai Party, along with former politicians and legal scholars, who called for an ethics investigation .

On 2 September 2024, a motion in the Senate of Thailand made by Senator Nantana Nantavaropas into Udom's comments was dropped 117 to 27. Nanthana was instead asked to seek a probe into Udom with an independent agency like the National Anti-Corruption Commission.
