= Chanakarn Theeravechpolkul =

Thai jurist

- ชนากานต์ ธีรเวชพลกุล

50th President of the Supreme Court of Thailand
- Incumbent
- Assumed office 1 October 2024
- Preceded by: Anocha Chevitsophon

Personal details
- Education: Thammasat University (LL.B)

Chanakarn Theeravechpolkul (Thai: ชนากานต์ ธีรเวชพลกุล) is a Thai jurist, serving as the 50th President of the Supreme Court of Thailand from October 2024. Theeravechpolkul is the fourth woman appointed president of the court.

== Early life and education ==
She received a Bachelor of Laws from Thammasat University.

== Career ==
=== Supreme Court ===
Chanakarn served as President of the Supreme Court of Thailand's Juvenile and Family Division until 2024.

On 8 July 2024, the Judicial Commission unanimously voted to appoint Chanakarn as President of the Supreme Court of Thailand.

Before her appointment to the Supreme Court's Juvenile and Family Division, Theeravechpolkul held several senior judicial positions, including Deputy Chief Justice of the Bangkok South Civil Court, Deputy Chief Justice of the Court of Appeal for Specialized Cases, and Vice President of the Court of Appeal, Region 9. She also served as head of judges at the Phitsanulok Juvenile and Family Court, Phitsanulok Kwaeng Court, Bangkok South Civil Court, and Central Bankruptcy Court.
