= Sumath Roygulcharoen =

- สุเมธ รอยกุลเจริญ

Justice of the Constitutional Court of Thailand
- Incumbent
- Assumed office 19 March 2024

Personal details
- Born: 16 September 1955 (age 70)

Sumath Roygulcharoen (Thai: สุเมธ รอยกุลเจริญ; born 16 September 1955) (Note: RTGS: Sumet Roikuncherin; other spellings include Sumet Roikulcharoen) is a Thai jurist serving as a Justice of the Constitutional Court of Thailand since 2024. He previously served a Justice of the Administrative Court.

== Early life and education ==
He received a Bachelor of Laws and Master of Laws from Ramkhamhaeng University, a Master of Public Administration from Siam University. He also holds an Honorary Doctorate of Law from Ramkhamhaeng University.

== Career ==
On 12 December 2023, Sumath's appointment was approved by the Senate of Thailand with 207 votes.

Sumath's appointment was given royal endorsement by King Vajiralongkorn on 19 March 2024 and was published in the Royal Gazette on 22 March 2024.

== Personal life ==
Sumath is married to Suwarada Hamephatra Roygulcharoen.
