= Piyakul Boonperm =

- ปิยกุล บุญเพิ่ม

47th President of the Supreme Court of Thailand
- In office 2021–2022
- Preceded by: Methinee Chalothorn
- Succeeded by: Chotiwat Luengprasert

Piyakul Boonperm (Thai: ปิยกุล บุญเพิ่ม) is a Thai jurist who served as the 47th President of the Supreme Court of Thailand from 2021 to 2022. Piyakul was the second woman appointed president of the court, succeeding Methinee Chalothorn, the first woman appointed president of the court.
