= Methinee Chalothorn =

- เมทินี ชโลธร

46th President of the Supreme Court of Thailand
- In office 1 October 2020 – September 2021
- Preceded by: Salaiket Watanaphan
- Succeeded by: Piyakul Boonperm

Methinee Chalothorn (Thai: เมทินี ชโลธร) is a Thai jurist who served as the 46th President of the Supreme Court of Thailand from 2020 to 2021. Methinee was the first woman appointed president of the court.
