= Bunjongsak Wongprachaya =

- บรรจงศักดิ์ วงศ์ปราชญ์

Justice of the Constitutional Court of Thailand
- Incumbent
- Assumed office 20 August 2020

Personal details
- Born: 14 August 1952 (age 73)

Bunjongsak Wongprachaya (Thai: บรรจงศักดิ์ วงศ์ปราชญ์, RTGS: Banchongsak Wongprat; born 14 August 1952) (Note: Other spellings include Banjongsak Wongprachan) is a Thai jurist serving as a Justice of the Constitutional Court of Thailand since 2020. He previously served as a Justice of the Administrative Court.

== Early life and education ==
He received a Bachelor of Arts in Political Science from Chiang Mai University, a Bachelor of Laws with Second Class Honors from Chulalongkorn University, and a Master of Arts in Political Science from Ramkhamhaeng University.

== Career ==
=== Constitutional Court ===
Bunjongsak's appointment was given royal endorsement by King Vajiralongkorn on 20 August 2020 and was published in the Royal Gazette on 26 August 2020.

==== Move Forward Party dissolution ====
On 7 August 2024 in the dissolution resolution of the Move Forward Party, Bunjongsak joined the unanimous vote that the party sought to take control of the country through unconstitutional means. He was in the minority of the 8 to 1 vote that that party was hostile to Thailand's system of democratic governance with the King as head of state.

He also opposed banning Pita Limjaroenrat from politics, again voting in the minority alongside Noppadon Theppitak.
