= Chotiwat Luengprasert =

- โชติวัฒน์ เหลืองประเสริฐ

48th President of the Supreme Court of Thailand
- In office 2022–2023
- Preceded by: Piyakul Boonperm
- Succeeded by: Anocha Chevitsophon

Personal details
- Born: 28 October 1956 (age 68)

Chotiwat Luengprasert (Thai: โชติวัฒน์ เหลืองประเสริฐ; born 28 October 1956) is a Thai jurist who served as the 48th President of the Supreme Court of Thailand from 2022 to 2023.
