= Anocha Chevitsophon =

- อโนชา ชีวิตโสภณ

49th President of the Supreme Court of Thailand
- In office 1 October 2023 – 30 September 2024
- Preceded by: Chotiwat Luengprasert
- Succeeded by: Chanakarn Theeravechpolkul

Personal details
- Born: 10 October 1958 (age 67)
- Education: Chulalongkorn University (LL.B, LL.M)

Anocha Chevitsophon (Thai: อโนชา ชีวิตโสภณ; born 10 October 1958) is a Thai jurist who served as the 49th President of the Supreme Court of Thailand from 2023 to 2024. Anocha was the third woman appointed president of the court.
