= Military courts of Thailand =

The military courts of Thailand (Thai: ศาลทหาร; RTGS: san thahan) are judicial bodies with criminal jurisdiction over members of the Royal Thai Armed Forces and sometimes also over civilians as may be assigned by law, as was the case from 25 May 2014 until 12 September 2016 following the 2014 Thai coup d'état.

Unlike other courts in the judicial system of Thailand, military courts are subject to the Ministry of Defence and are operated by the military's Judge Advocate General's Department.

== Procedure ==
The current procedural law governing the military courts is the Military Court Organisation Act 1955 (Thai: พระราชบัญญัติธรรมนูญศาลทหาร พ.ศ. ๒๔๙๘). The act allows the Judge Advocate General of Thailand (Thai: เจ้ากรมพระธรรมนูญ) to establish court regulations. In wartime or during the imposition of martial law, military courts may adopt special procedures.

== Judges ==
Military court judges (Thai: ตุลาการ) are serving military officers of two types: "general judges" (Thai: ตุลาการปรกติ) and "judge-advocates" (Thai: ตุลาการพระธรรมนูญ). General judges are officers for whom legal training is not a prerequisite. Judge-advocates are trained and accredited in the law.

== Structure ==
According to the Military Court Organisation Act 1955, military courts consist of three tiers: courts of first (trial court), second (appellate court), and third instance (final court of appeal).

Name	Quorum	Notes
Military courts of first instance
Military province courts (Thai: ศาลจังหวัดทหาร)	2 commissioned officers as general judges; 1 judge-advocate	Established in every military province (Thai: จังหวัดทหาร), except provinces with Military Prefectural Commands (Thai: กองบัญชาการมณฑล); Empowered to exercise jurisdiction over members of the armed forces other than commissioned officers
Military prefecture courts (Thai: ศาลมณฑลทหาร)	2 commissioned officers as general judges; 1 judge-advocate	Established in every military prefecture (Thai: มณฑลทหาร), except the prefecture where the Bangkok Military Court is located; Empowered to exercise jurisdiction over all members of the armed forces other than general officers
Bangkok Military Court (Thai: ศาลทหารกรุงเทพ)	2 commissioned officers as general judges; 1 judge-advocate	Invested with unlimited jurisdiction
Military unit courts (Thai: ศาลประจำหน่วยทหาร)	2 commissioned officers as general judges; 1 judge-advocate	Established within a military body of no fewer than 1,000 members outside Thailand
Military courts of second instance
Central Military Court (Thai: ศาลทหารกลาง)	1 or 2 general officers as general judges; 1 or 2 colonels or equivalents as general judges; 2 judge-advocates	
Military courts of last resort
Supreme Military Court (Thai: ศาลทหารสูงสุด)	2 general officers as general judges; 3 judge-advocates	

The act permits the establishment of special military courts, known as war crime courts (Thai: ศาลอาญาศึก), in time of war or during periods of martial law.

== See also ==
- Judiciary of Thailand
