= Chiranit Havanond =

Justice of the Constitutional Court of Thailand since 2020

- จิรนิติ หะวานนท์

Justice of the Constitutional Court of Thailand
- Incumbent
- Assumed office 1 April 2020

Personal details
- Born: 14 February 1953 (age 73)

Chiranit Havanond (Thai: จิรนิติ หะวานนท์; born 14 February 1953) (Note: Other spellings include Jiraniti Havanon) is a Thai jurist serving as a Justice of the Constitutional Court of Thailand since 2020. He previously served as a presiding judge of the Supreme Court of Thailand.

== Early life and education ==
He received a Bachelor of Laws with First Class Honors from Thammasat University, a Master of Laws from Harvard University, a Masters of Comparative Law and a Doctor of Juridical Science from George Washington University.

== Career ==
=== Constitutional Court ===
Worawit's appointment was given royal endorsement by King Vajiralongkorn on 1 April 2020 and was published in the Royal Gazette on 6 April 2020.

==== 2020–2021 Thai protests ====
In November 2011, the Constitutional Court ruled that anti-monarchy speeches of three leaders of the 2020–2021 Thai protests (Panusaya Sithijirawattanakul, Arnon Nampa, and Panupong Jadnok) were unconstitutional, and amounted to attempts to overthrow Thailand's political system.

Chiranit stated “If we allow the first, second and third defendant and their networks to keep doing this action, it will not be long to lead to the overthrow of the constitutional monarchy,” in response to their demands. The protest leaders denied attempting to end the monarchy, advocating reforms to Thailand's lèse-majesté laws and greater transparency surrounding royal finances.

On 10 August 2024, the Student Council of Chulalongkorn University invited Chiranit, who served as a special lecturer for the university's Faculty of Law, to a meeting to speak about the ruling on 14 August 2024.
