= Wiroon Sangtian =

Thai jurist

- วิรุฬห์ แสงเทียน

Justice of the Constitutional Court of Thailand
- Incumbent
- Assumed office 1 April 2020

Personal details
- Born: 27 November 1951 (age 73)

Wiroon Sangtian (Thai: วิรุฬห์ แสงเทียน, RTGS: Wirun Saengthian; born 27 November 1951) is a Thai jurist serving as a Justice of the Constitutional Court of Thailand since 2020. He previously served as a senior justice of the Supreme Court of Thailand.

== Early life and education ==
Wiroon received a Bachelor of Laws from Thammasat University.

== Career ==
In February 2015, Wiroon was named one of 9 judges to oversee the trial of former Prime Minister Yingluck Shinawatra on her government's rice-pledging scheme.

=== Supreme Court ===
Wiroon served as Deputy President of the Supreme Court of Thailand.

=== Constitutional Court ===
Wiroon's appointment was given royal endorsement by King Vajiralongkorn on 1 April 2020 and was published in the Royal Gazette on 6 April 2020.
