= Punya Udchachon =

Thai judge

- ปัญญา อุดชาชน

Justice of the Constitutional Court of Thailand
- Incumbent
- Assumed office 16 May 2015

Personal details
- Born: 15 April 1956 (age 70)

Punya Udchachon (Thai: ปัญญา อุดชาชน, RTGS: Panya Utchachon; born 15 April 1956) (Note: Other spellings include Panya Udchachon) is a Thai jurist serving as a Justice of the Constitutional Court of Thailand since 2015. He previously served as secretary-general of the Constitutional court.

== Early life and education ==
Punya received a Bachelor of Arts in Political Science from Ramkhamhaeng University, a Bachelor of Laws from Sukhothai Thammathirat Open University, and a Master of Laws in Public Law from Chulalongkorn University.

== Career ==
=== Constitutional Court ===
Punya's term as a Justice of the Constitutional Court expired in November 2024, but he has continued to serve until a replacement is appointed.

==== Move Forward Party dissolution ====
On 7 August 2024 in the dissolution resolution of the Move Forward Party, Punya joined the unanimous vote that the party sought to take control of the country through unconstitutional means. He later confirmed the unanimity of the vote.

==== Removal of Srettha Thavisin ====
On 14 August 2024, the Court removed Prime Minister Srettha Thavisin from office with a 5 to 4 vote, ruling he had violated rules after appointing Pichit Chuenban, a lawyer with a prior criminal conviction to his cabinet. Punya stated that "The appointment of the second respondent [Pichit] shows the first respondent [Srettha] has no honesty and breached ethical standards."
