= Worawit Kangsasitiam =

- วรวิทย์ กังศศิเทียม

President of the Constitutional Court of Thailand
- In office 1 April 2020 – 9 September 2023
- Succeeded by: Nakarin Mektrairat

Justice of the Constitutional Court of Thailand
- In office 9 September 2014 – 9 September 2023

Personal details
- Born: 1 March 1952 (age 74)
- Education: Thammasat University (LL.B); Ramkhamhaeng University LL.M)

Worawit Kangsasitiam (Thai: วรวิทย์ กังศศิเทียม; born 1 March 1952) is a Thai jurist who served as the President of the Constitutional Court of Thailand from 2020 to 2023.

== Constitutional court ==
Worawit was appointed as a Constitutional Court judge in 2014, under Thailand's 2007 constitution.

Worawit's appointment as President of the Constitutional Court was given royal endorsement by King Vajiralongkorn on 1 April 2020 and was published in the Royal Gazette on 6 April 2020.
