= Twekiat Menakanist =

- ทวีเกียรติ มีนะกนิษฐ

Justice of the Constitutional Court of Thailand
- In office 21 October 2013 – 27 January 2023
- Preceded by: Wasan Soypisudh
- Succeeded by: Udom Rathamarit

Twekiat Menakanist (Thai: ทวีเกียรติ มีนะกนิษฐ) is a Thai jurist who served as a Justice of the Constitutional Court of Thailand from 2013 to 2023. Prior to his appointment, he served as a lecturer at Thammasat University's Faculty of Law from 1975 to 2013.

== Career ==
In 2019, Twekiat was one of 9 judges who unanimously ruled to disband the Thai Raksa Chart Party after it nominated Princess Ubol Ratana as its prime minister candidate in the 2019 elections.
