= Udom Rathamarit =

- อุดม รัฐอมฤต

Justice of the Constitutional Court of Thailand
- Incumbent
- Assumed office 31 January 2023
- Preceded by: Twekiat Menakanist

Personal details
- Born: 28 June 1959 (age 66)

Udom Rathamarit (Thai: อุดม รัฐอมฤต, RTGS: Udom Ratomrit; 28 June 1959) is a Thai jurist serving as a Justice of the Constitutional Court of Thailand since 2023. He previously served as Thammasat University's Faculty of Law dean.

== Early life and education ==
He received a Bachelor of Laws Master of Laws from Thammasat University, an Advanced Diploma in Criminal Law from the University of Paris, and a Doctorate in Criminal Justice from Nancy-Université.

== Career ==
=== Constitutional Court ===
Udom's appointment was given royal endorsement by King Vajiralongkorn on 28 January 2023 and was published in the Royal Gazette on 31 January 2023.

=== Move Forward Party dissolution ===
Following the Court's 7 August 2024 vote to dissolve the Move Forward Party, the Thammasat University Rangsit Campus Student Council and a Faculty of Law committee of students posted an open letter to Facebook on 10 August 2024 calling for Thammasat law students to sign a petition to have Udom dismissed as a special lecturer at the university.

On 14 August 2024, the Thammasat University Rangsit Campus Student Council announced on Facebook that Udom had resigned from his position as a special lecturer at the Faculty of Law of the university.
