= Noppadon Theppitak =

Thai diplomat and jurist (born 1956)

- นภดล เทพพิทักษ์

Justice of the Constitutional Court of Thailand
- Incumbent
- Assumed office 1 April 2020

Ambassador of Thailand to Laos
- In office 27 November 2015 – 30 September 2017

Personal details
- Born: 3 December 1956 (age 69)

Noppadon Theppitak (Thai: นภดล เทพพิทักษ์, RTGS: Nopphadon Thepphithak; born 3 December 1956) is a Thai diplomat and jurist serving as a Justice of the Constitutional Court of Thailand since 2020.

== Early life and education ==
He received a Bachelor of Arts in Political Science with First Class Honours from Chulalongkorn University. He later studied in the United States as a Fulbright scholar, and received a Master of Arts in International Relations from Northern Illinois University.

== Career ==
=== Diplomatic positions ===
Noppadom served as Ambassador of Thailand to Egypt from 2006 to 2010. He served as Ambassador of Thailand to New Zealand from 2010 to 2015, and as Ambassador of Thailand to Laos from 2015 to 2017.

=== Constitutional Court ===
Noppadon's appointment was given royal endorsement by King Vajiralongkorn on 1 April 2020 and was published in the Royal Gazette on 6 April 2020.
