= Judiciary of Thailand =

Judicial system of Thailand

The judiciary of Thailand (Thai: ฝ่ายตุลาการไทย; RTGS: Fai Tulakan Thai) is composed of four distinct systems: the Court of Justice, the Administrative Court, military courts, and the Constitutional Court of Thailand. The current judicial system is organized in accordance with the 2007 Constitution of Thailand.

The Asian Human Rights Commission has called the Thai legal system a "mess" and called for a drastic overhaul of Thailand's criminal procedures. It cited the rampant use of forced confessions, and the fact that even a senior justice ministry official admitted that 30 percent of cases went to court with no evidence. No stenographic records are made by the trial court and the record is composed of what the judges decide. It also criticized the judiciary for failing to ensure that trials are conducted speedily.

Research judges assist the sitting judges. Judges must take an examination and two different examinations are given: one exam is for judges trained in Thailand and a different examination is given for judges who graduate from foreign law schools. All judges are formally appointed by the king.

== Courts of Justice ==
The Courts of Justice of Thailand (ศาลยุติธรรม) is the largest of the court systems and makes up the majority of courts in the kingdom. The courts as mandated in the constitution consists of three tiers: the court of first instance (ศาลชั้นต้น), the court of appeals (ศาลอุทธรณ์), and the court of last resort, that is, the Supreme Court of Thailand (ศาลฎีกา).

The current president of the Supreme Court of Justice is Veerapol Tungsuwan.

== Administrative courts ==
The administrative court system (ศาลปกครอง) is composed of two tiers: The administrative courts of first instance (ศาลปกครองชั้นต้น) and the administrative court of last resort, that is, the Supreme Administrative Court (ศาลปกครองสูงสุด). The court system was first created in 1997, the court's main jurisdiction is to settle litigation between the state or an organ of state (government ministries, departments, and independent agencies) and private citizens.

=== Civil vs criminal ===
The Council of State is considering adjusting the definition of certain criminal offences so they are punishable by administrative penalties rather than criminal imprisonment. The high number of criminal cases are overwhelming the court system and overcrowding jails nationwide. Thailand reportedly ranked sixth in the world in terms of the number of criminal suspects in the judicial process, about 300,000 persons. The state reportedly spends about 100,000 baht per criminal case — including the wages of police, judges and related officials — and only 6,000 baht per civil lawsuit, according to a study by Thailand Development Research Institute. While serious crimes such as theft and murder would still be subject to criminal prosecution, other offences, such as those involving cheque payments or copyright infringement, could be punished by administrative penalties to unburden the criminal court system.

== Constitutional Court ==
First set up in 1997, the Constitutional Court of Thailand (ศาลรัฐธรรมนูญ) was created solely as a high court to settle matters pertaining to the constitution. The court has since accumulated huge amounts of power and influence in the wake of the 2006 and 2014 military coups and the constitutions they created, engaging in what critics of the court call political coups, ousting prime ministers from office, and climaxing in a ruling in 2013 that parliament could not amend the constitution according to its terms to elect all senators because that would violate the court's definition of a "democratic regime". In May 2014, the Constitutional Court ruled that the Thai prime minister and nine other cabinet ministers had to resign due to malfeasance. Questions have been raised not only over the court's increasing power over this matter, but why the Supreme Court, which apparently has jurisdiction in such cases, did not adjudicate. There have been repeated calls for reform or outright elimination of the court because of its politicization.

== See also ==
- Government of Thailand
- Constitution of Thailand
- Law of Thailand
- Suicide of Khanakorn Pianchana
