= Military circles of Thailand =

Military administrative divisions of Thailand

Subdivisions of the Royal Thai Army

Military divisions (1990-2014)	Military divisions (present)
- Category: Military district
- Location: Thailand
- Number: 4 regions, 35 districts (as of 2015)

Subdivisions of the Royal Thai Army' are a military formation and administrative division of the Royal Thai Army. Thailand is divided into four army areas (Thai: กองทัพภาค). An army area may have its satellite corps as a supporting unit. Each area consists of many army districts (Thai: มณฑลทหารบก), each of which covers one or few provinces and supervises many military units. Each army district and army area has a multitude of roles, including supervising all military units, including ones from other branches of the Royal Thai Armed Forces, recruit new members of the armed forces and work with local and central government. Thailand currently has 35 military districts, some of which cover only one province while many covers many provinces.

== List of current military subdivisions in Thailand ==
Thailand is divided into four military regions (or areas). Each region is subdivided into up to 10 districts. Army Region 1 covers central Thailand, while Region 2, 3 and 4 correspond to northeastern, northern and southern Thailand respectively. All key units are located at dedicated military forts, which are named after key monarchs or heroes.

=== Army Area 1 (central) ===
Army Area 1 was established on 13 January 1911 as an amalgamation of three monthon-level units. At that time it was named Army 1 There were two other armies, Army 2 and Army 3, located at Phitsanulok and Nakhon Ratchasima respectively. Army Area 1 controls Army Corps 1. It also supervises all military units in central Thailand, covering 9 army districts as follows.

District number	Provinces under supervision	Headquarters location	Named after
11	Bangkok, Nakhon Pathom, Nonthaburi, Pathum Thani, Samut Prakan	Laksi, Bangkok	
12	Prachinburi, Nakhon Nayok, Chachoengsao	Fort Chakraphong, Prachinburi	Chakrabongse Bhuvanath
13	Lopburi, Chai Nat, Sing Buri, Ang Thong	Fort King Narai Maharat, Lopburi	King Narai
14	Chonburi, Rayong	Fort Nawaminthrachini, Chonburi	Queen Sirikit
15	Phetchaburi, Prachuap Khiri Khan	Fort Ramratchaniwet, Phetchaburi	Named by Chulalongkorn
16	Ratchaburi, Samut Songkhram, Samut Sakhon	Fort Phanurangsi, Ratchaburi	Bhanurangsi Savangwongse
17	Kanchanaburi, Suphan Buri	Fort Surasi, Kanchanaburi	Viceroy Maha Sura Singhanat
18	Saraburi, Phra Nakhon Si Ayutthaya	Fort Adisorn, Saraburi	Prince Suksawasdi, Krom Luang Adisorn Udomdej
19	Sa Kaeo, Chanthaburi, Trat	Fort Surasinghanat, Sa Kaeo	Viceroy Maha Sura Singhanat

=== Army Area 2 (northeastern) ===
Army 3, headquartered in Nakhon Ratchasima, was dissolved in 1927 due to economic depression. The unit was re-established by the royal decree of 1948 and named Army Area 2. It supervises 10 army districts, all of which are in northeastern Thailand. It also commands Army Corps 2. Its headquarters are at Fort Suranari, Nakhon Ratchasima.

District number	Provinces under supervision	Headquarters location	Named after
21	Nakhon Ratchasima, Chaiyaphum	Fort Suranari, Nakhon Ratchasima	Thao Suranari
22	Ubon Ratchathani, Amnat Charoen	Fort Sapphasitthiprasong, Ubon Ratchathani	Prince Chumphon Somphot, Krom Luang Sappasitthiprasong
23	Khon Kaen, Kalasin	Fort Sripatcharin, Khon Kaen	Queen Saovabha Phongsri
24	Udon Thani, Nong Khai	Fort Prachaksinlapakhom, Udon Thani	Prince Thongkongkonyai, Krom Luang Prachaksinlapakhom
25	Surin, Sisaket	Fort Weerawatyothin, Surin	Major-General Luang Weerawatyothin (Weerawat Raktachittakan)
26	Buriram, Maha Sarakham	Fort Somdej Chao Phraya Kasatsuek, Buriram	Former name of Rama I
27	Roi Et, Yasothon	Fort Prasertsongkhram, Roi Et	Major-General Phraya Prasertsongkhram (Thiap Khomkris)
28	Loei, Nong Bua Lamphu	Fort Srisongrak, Loei	Phra That Si Song Rak
29	Sakon Nakhon, Bueng Kan	Fort Kris Sivara, Sakon Nakhon	General Kris Sivara
210	Nakhon Phanom, Mukdahan	Fort Phra Yod Mueang Khwang, Nakhon Phanom	Major Phra Yodmueangkhwang (Kham Yotphet)

=== Army Area 3 (northern) ===
Army 2, located in Phitsanulok, was reorganised in 1948 to form the Army Area 3. Its headquarters are at Fort King Naresuan the Great, Phitsanulok. It supervises Army Corps 3 and 10 army districts, all of which are from northern Thailand.

District number	Provinces under supervision	Headquarters location	Named after
31	Nakhon Sawan, Kamphaeng Phet, Uthai Thani	Fort Chiraprawat, Nakhon Sawan	Field Marshall Prince Chirapravati Voradej, Krom Luang Nakhon Chaisri Suradet
32	Lampang	Fort Surasak Montri, Lampang	Chaophraya Surasakmontri (Choem Saneg-chuto)
33	Chiang Mai, Mae Hong Son, Lamphun	Fort Kawila, Chiang Mai	Lord Kawila of Lampang
34	Phayao	Fort Khun Chueang Thammikkarat, Phayao	Phraya Chueang, a legendary king of northern Thailand
35	Uttaradit, Phrae	Fort Phichai Dabhak, Uttaradit	Phraya Phichai Dap Hak
36	Phetchabun, Phichit	Fort Phokhun Pha Mueang, Phetchabun	King Pha Mueang
37	Chiang Rai	Fort King Mengrai Maharat, Chiang Rai	King Mangrai
38	Nan	Fort Suriyaphong, Nan	Lord Suriyaphong Pharittadet, Former ruler of Nan
39	Phitsanulok, Sukhothai	Fort King Naresuan Maharat, Phitsanulok	King Naresuan
310	Tak	Fort Wachiraprakan, Tak	Former name of King Taksin

=== Army Area 4 (southern) ===
On 7 February 1925, Army Area 4 was established to supervise all military units in southern Thailand. Unlike other army areas, Army Area 4 does not have a satellite corp. Its headquarters are at Fort Vajiravudh, Nakhon Sri Thammarat.

District number	Provinces under supervision	Headquarters location	Named after
41	Nakhon Si Thammarat (except Thung Song District), Phuket	Fort Vajiravudh, Nakhon Si Thammarat	King Vajiravudh
42	Songkhla, Phatthalung, Satun	Fort Senanarong, Songkhla	Luang Senanarong (Sak Senanarong)
43	Nakhon Si Thammarat (only Thung Song District), Krabi, Trang	Fort Thep Satri Srisunthorn, Nakhon Si Thammarat	Thao Thep Krasattri and Thao Si Sunthon
44	Chumphon, Ranong	Fort Khet Udomsak, Chumphon	Prince Abhakara Kiartivongse, Krom Luang Chumphon Khet Udomsak
45	Surat Thani, Phang Nga	Fort Vibhavadi Rangsit, Surat Thani	Princess Vibhavadi Rangsit
46	Pattani, Narathiwat, Yala	Fort Ingkhayutthaborihan, Pattani	Colonel Kun Ingkhayutthaborihan (Thongsuk Ingkhakul)

== Map of subdivisions of the Royal Thai Army ==
This map shows subdivisions of the Royal Thai Army, in accordance with the 2015 ministerial regulation signed by Prayut Chan-o-cha. The country is split into four army areas, numbered 1 to 4. Each army area contains 6 to 10 army districts. Each district is numbered. The first digit refers to the army area in which the district is located. The second and third digits are a sequential number 1 to 10 (without 0). As a consequence, there are no district 10, 20, 30 and 40. All army districts are provincial-level military units de facto. Sometimes army districts are referred to as military circles due to ambiguity of the original Pali term. (Note: Some "มณฑลทหารบก"'s refer to themselves as military district. For instance, Military District 38 in Nan Province. Some units just refer to themselves as "military monthons" or "monthon thahan bok" or "mtb", for example, Military District 42 in Songkhla Province. It is also noted that So Sethaputra's English-Thai dictionary confirms the correctness of the term district.)

== Roles ==
In accordance with the by-law enacted in 2009, all army areas plan, manage, supervise and act as a chief in national security, peacekeeping and other roles according to the government policy. All army areas also

1. Secure all members of the Royal Family;
2. Actuate Royal-initiated projects (in collaboration with other bodies), and
3. Engage in Military operations other than war.

As subordinate units to the army areas, military districts have following roles

1. Govern local military forces, according to instructions and regulations by the Ministry of Defence;
2. Maintain peace in its area; supervise military courts, cases, witness protection and military prisons;
3. Recruit new members of the forces; oversee conscription and military summoning;
4. Support military units in its area;
5. Protect the internal security and national security according to the strategic plan;
6. Support the government in supporting Thai citizens;
7. Work closely with the Internal Security Operations Command local centres.

== History ==
In 1911, Vajiravudh proposed that Siam (now Thailand) must have a modernised army system. He divided Siam into three regions, Army 1 (central and southern), Army 2 (northern) and Army 3 (northeastern). Each monthon (a collection of cities and settlements, similar to China today) has one division. All divisions in a region formed a regional army. In 1927, due to economic crisis, northeastern army and some military units were dissolved. The remaining armies were Armies 1 and 2, located at Bangkok and Ayutthaya respectively.

In 1948, during the Bhumibol Adulyadej's reign, Thailand was divided into 5 military districts in accordance with different regions: central, eastern, northeastern, northern and southern. Seventeen years later, the Royal Thai Army realised that the organisation was too bulky--there were too many provinces under supervision of an army district. The military government, led by Thanom Kittikachorn, proposed that the country be divided into three armies. Each armies were divided into districts

In 1990, the Royal Thai Army was reorganised into four army regions. Each region was divided into many army districts, each of which covered few provinces. Each military district was divided into military provinces (Thai: จังหวัดทหารบก). Some military provinces cover many civil provinces (Thai: จังหวัด) (such as Chiang Mai army province, covered Chiang Mai, Mae Hong Son and Lamphun), while others cover one (such as Nan army province, covered Nan only). As a superior unit to provinces, army district were located at large military bases in key provinces. In 2015, Prayut Chan-o-cha proposed that each military district should cover fewer provinces in order to make the chain of command more efficient and reduce the complexities of the military formation. This is particularly clear in northern and northeastern Thailand.

== See also ==
- Provinces of Thailand
- Monthon
- Royal Thai Army
- Military district
- Divisions of the United States Army -- Similar military subdivision system used in the United States
