= Nakharin Mektrairat =

Thai jurist and academic (born 1958)

- นครินทร์ เมฆไตรรัตน์
- Nakharin in 2026

President of the Constitutional Court of Thailand
- In office 19 March 2024 – 23 July 2026
- Preceded by: Worawit Kangsasitiam

Justice of the Constitutional Court of Thailand
- In office 16 November 2015 – 23 July 2026

Personal details
- Born: 28 July 1958 (age 68)
- Education: Thammasat University (BA); Chulalongkorn University (MA); Waseda University (PhD)

Nakharin Mektrairat (Thai: นครินทร์ เมฆไตรรัตน์, also spelled Nakarin; born 28 July 1958) is a Thai jurist and academic who has served as the President of the Constitutional Court of Thailand from 2024 until 2026. Nakharin previously served as an administrator at Thammasat University from 2011 to 2015, and as dean of faculty of political science from 2004 to 2010.

== Constitutional court ==
Nakharin was appointed as a Constitutional Court judge in November 2015, under Thailand's 2007 constitution. Nakharin's presidency of the Constitutional Court has overseen the disqualification of the Move Forward Party and its leadership, along with Prime Minister Srettha Thavisin.
