= Administrative Court of Thailand =

Thai national judiciary branch

Coordinates: 13.8895°N 100.5685°E

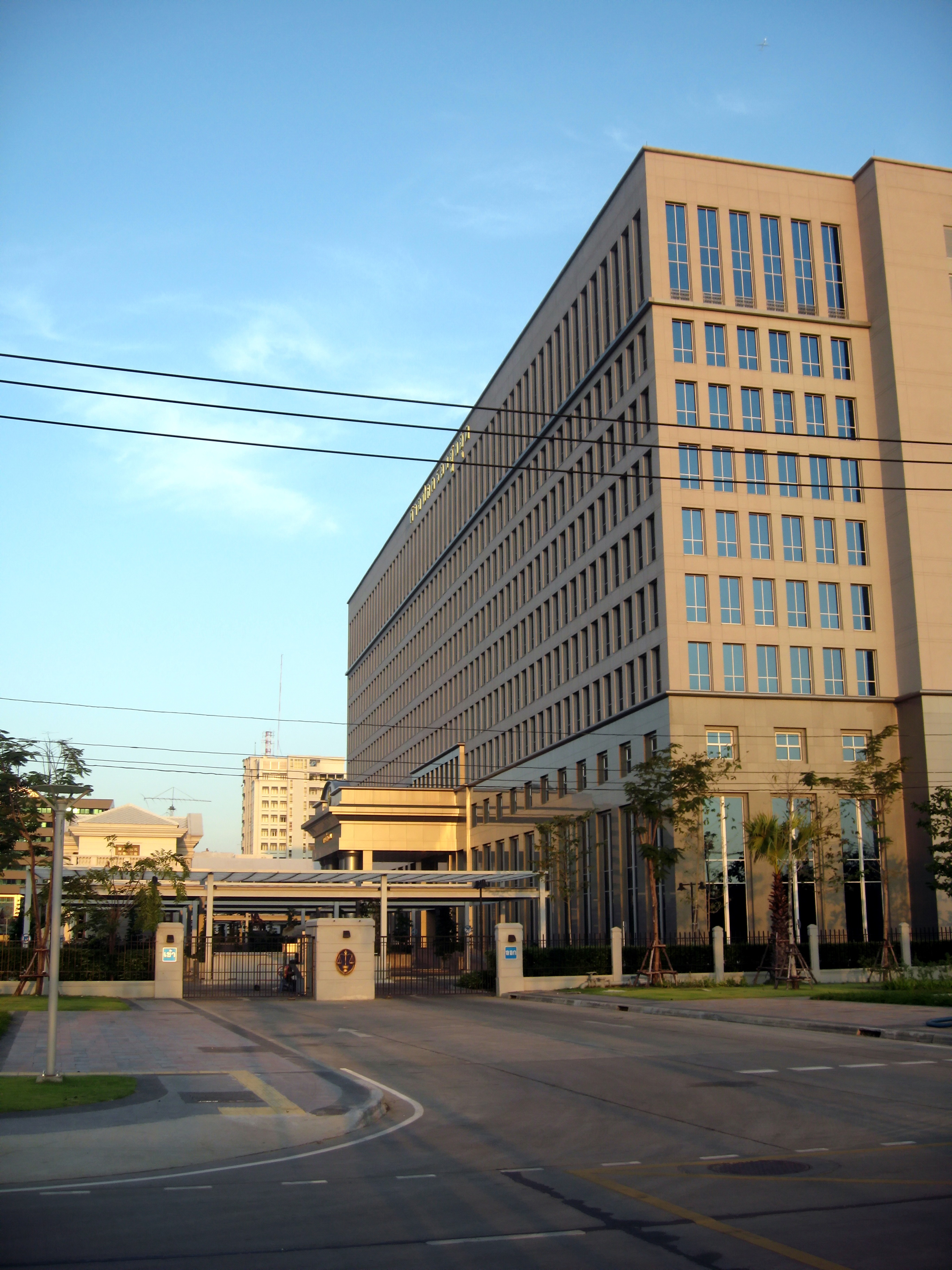
Administrative Court at Chaengwattana Rd.

The Administrative Court of Thailand (Thai: ศาลปกครอง) is a branch of the national judiciary, concerning grievances against state agencies or public officials. It was first established in 2001, in accordance with the 1997 constitution, along with the Office of the Ombudsman. The court is composed of two tiers: the administrative courts of first instance, and the Supreme Administrative Court.
