= Supreme Court of Thailand =

Highest court in Thailand

Supreme Court of Thailand ศาลฎีกา
- Emblem of Court of Justice Thailand

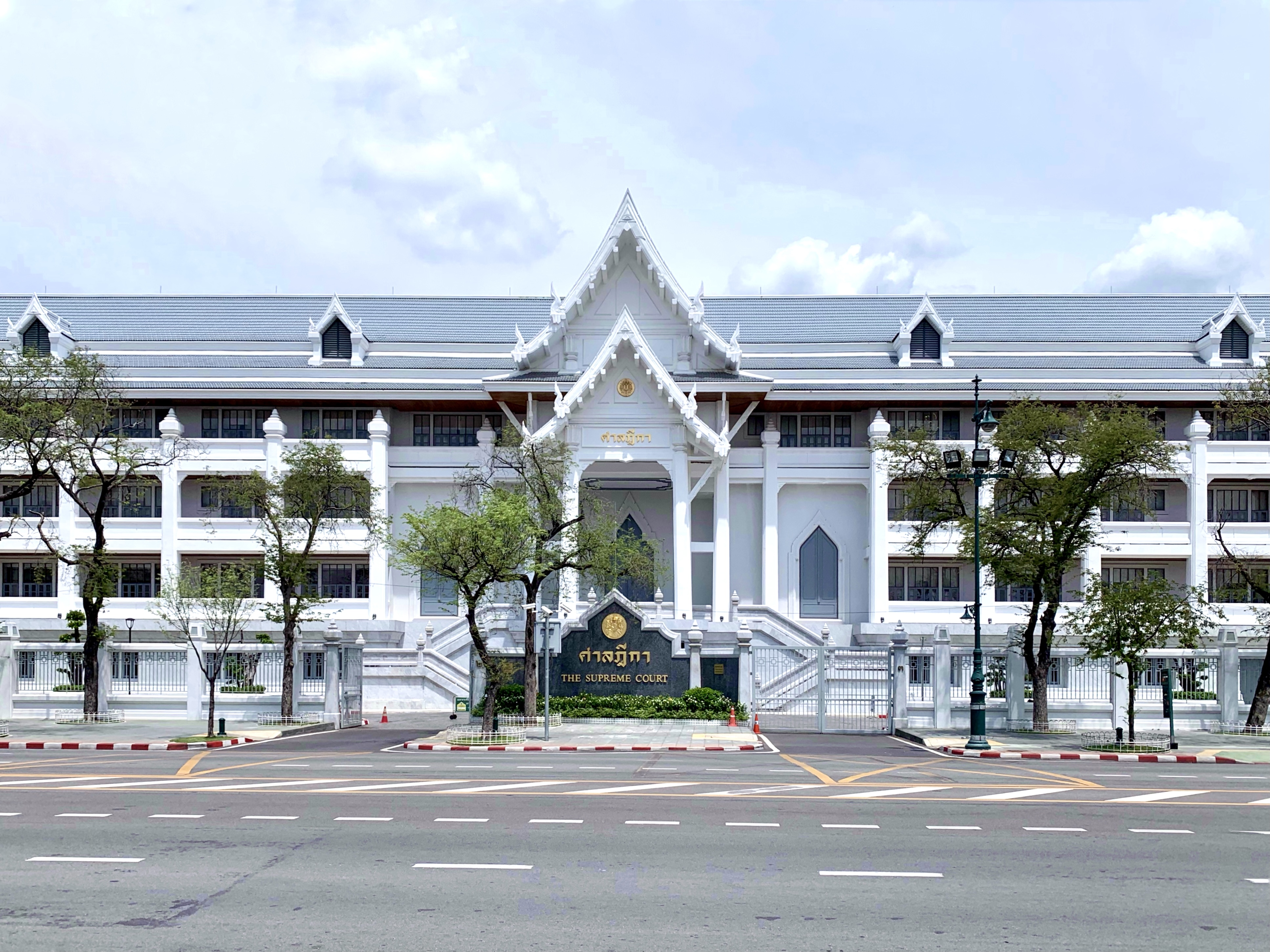
- Supreme Court Building in Phra Nakhon District, Bangkok, 2021
- Interactive map of Supreme Court of Thailand ศาลฎีกา
- Established: 1891; 135 years ago
- Jurisdiction: Kingdom of Thailand
- Location: Bangkok, Thailand
- Composition method: Selection by Judicial Commission
- Appeals from: the Appeal Court
- Website: www.supremecourt.or.th

President
- Currently: Adisak Tantiwong
- Since: 1 October 2025

The Supreme Court of Thailand (Thai: ศาลฎีกา, romanized: San Dika), located in Bangkok, Thailand, is the highest Thai court of justice, covering criminal and civil cases of the entire country. The Supreme Court operates separately from the Administrative Court and the Constitutional Court. Its judgments are considered final; neither plaintiff nor respondent can request any further appeals.

A justice of the Supreme Court can be appointed from among justices of the Court of Appeals having seniority, extensive knowledge and experience. The current president of the Supreme Court is Judge Adisak Tantiwong.

== History ==
Historically, there was no Supreme Court since a Thai monarch would adjudicate all disputes as the sole supreme judicial authority. Citizens appealed directly to the King along his route to places out of the Palace. This system existed until the early Rattanakosin Era, including through the reign of King Rama IV.

During the reign of King Rama V, an official department for appeals was set up in the Palace, and in 1891, the king created the Ministry of Justice. The Judicator Act of 1909 was also enacted under Rama V's reign. This act established the Supreme Court as the highest court in the country, and cases were no longer appealed to the king.

After Thailand adopted a democratic, constitutional form of government during the Siamese revolution of 1932, the Judicator Act of 1934 was enacted to amend the previous Judicator Act of 1909. The courts were divided into three levels, namely, Court of First Instance, Court of Appeals, and the Supreme Court.

== Jurisdiction ==
The Supreme Court of Thailand acts as the final court of appeal in all civil and criminal cases in the entire kingdom. An order or judgment of the Supreme Court in all kinds of cases is final.

A party who challenges an order or a judgment issued by the Courts of First Instances, the Court of Appeal or the Courts of Appeal Regions I – IX, has the right to appeal against the lower court's order or judgment, following the conditions and circumstances as required by law.

Specialized laws such as the procedural laws on labor, tax, intellectual property, and international trade allow parties to appeal against judgments of such specialized courts directly to the Supreme Court.

== Composition ==
Flag of the president of the Supreme Court of Thailand

The Court consists of the president, vice presidents, secretary, and a number of justices. In the present-day judicial system, the president of the Supreme Court is also the head of the Courts of Justice.

At least three justices of the Supreme Court form a quorum. At present, the Supreme Court has divided the justices internally into 25 quorums. Each quorum has three justices; the most senior justice in a quorum is the presiding justice of the quorum.

The Supreme Court has ten divisions for specialized cases, namely,

- Division of Juvenile and Family
- Division of Labour
- Division of Taxes
- Division of Intellectual Property and International Trading, including copyright law of Thailand
- Division of Bankruptcy
- Criminal Division of Holders of Political Positions
- Division of Commerce and Economy
- Environmental Division of the Supreme Court
- Division of Consumer
- Division of Election Cases

Specialized divisions have nine justices in each division, as assigned by the president of the Supreme Court, and, also, one chief justice or presiding justice supervising the work of the division. The judgment will be made by the majority of votes among justices in the quorum after each of justice's written opinion and oral statement to the meeting before making a decision.

== Functions and procedure ==
After being reviewed and brought through the initial process of administrative work, the appeals against judgment of the lower courts to the Supreme Court will be assigned to justices of the Supreme Court by the president of the Supreme Court on a case-by-case basis. This process often takes approximately 15 days. However, there are some kinds of special cases such as intellectual property, tax, bankruptcy, and, international trade which are the exception. In addition, some criminal cases in which the defendants are in custody during the trials are given priority.

The adjudication process of the quorum of the Supreme Court occurs when the court allows plaintiff and respondent to present the factual and legal issues from their sides in the trial. This process can take from a few months to the expiry of the case, depending on the decision the senior judges of the case made as appropriate.

Afterward, a draft of judgment or order is released. The examination process by the Research Division or approval process by a certain specialized division can then take place. This process can take up to a month. The procedure ends with the transmission of a case file with a judgment of the Supreme Court to the Court of First Instance for pronouncement.

== See also ==
- Judiciary of Thailand
