= 2025 Thai political crisis =

- Prime Minister's Office notification announcing the resignation of 8 Bhumjaithai Party ministers after the party left the coalition
- Date: 18 June 2025 – 7 September 2025
- Cause: Discontent of the Shinawatra family and disaster funding; Thailand–Cambodia phone call leak; Loss in public support for Paetongtarn Shinawatra; Cambodian–Thai border crisis; Senate election corruption scandal
- Motive: Pressure Paetongtarn Shinawatra to resign; Trigger an early general election
- Participants: Bhumjaithai Party; United Thai Nation Party
- Outcome: Bhumjaithai Party withdraws from the coalition; United Thai Nation Party resolves to seek the Prime Minister's resignation after passing the annual budget bill; Paetongtarn Shinawatra suspended, and then removed from the office by the Constitutional Court; Anutin Charnvirakul becomes 32nd Prime Minister of Thailand

On 18 June 2025, a political crisis in Thailand arose when a phone call between then-Prime Minister Paetongtarn Shinawatra and Cambodian senate president Hun Sen leaked amidst a major border conflict between the two kingdoms. The leak led the Bhumjaithai Party to withdraw from the governing coalition led by Paetongtarn and her Pheu Thai Party.

The resulting controversy and backlash led the Constitutional Court to suspend Paetongtarn from her official duties on 1 July, before fully removing her from office on 29 August. Due to the impasse created by the withdrawal of Bhumjaithai from the majority, the minority People's Party acted as kingmaker, supporting Anutin Charnvirakul, the Bhumjaithai party leader, to succeed the caretaker government.

== Background ==
Following the progressive Move Forward Party victory in the 2023 Thai general election, the Pheu Thai Party and conservative establishment parties formed a coalition government under Srettha Thavisin. Srettha was removed from office in August 2024 by the Constitutional Court, and was succeeded by Paetongtarn Shinawatra.

In May 2025, the country was described as "inching" towards a political crisis amidst the 2024 Thai Senate election scandal linked to vote buying and systemic fraud, along with tensions linked to former Prime Minister Thaksin Shinawatra's hospital detention.

=== 2024 Thai Senate election scandal ===
As of June 2025, 100 members of the Senate of Thailand have been accused of collusion and vote fixing in the 2024 Thai Senate election. Multiple probes were conducted by the Election Commission (EC) and the Department of Special Investigation (DSI).

=== 2025 Cambodian–Thai border crisis ===
On 15 June 2025, Paetongtarn and Cambodian Senate President and former Prime Minister Hun Sen held a 17-minute phone call on the 2025 Cambodian–Thai border crisis. On 18 June, a 9-minute audio segment of the call was leaked, including a section where Paetongtarn was critical of Lieutenant General Boonsin Padklang, the commander responsible for the border with Cambodia.

== Timeline ==
=== 18 June 2025 ===
==== Bhumjaithai withdrawal from Shinawatra government ====
On 18 June 2025, the Bhumjaithai Party announced it would withdraw from the government effective 19 June. The party holds 69 seats in the House of Representatives. The Party cited the leaked phone call between Paetongtarn and Hun Sen as the reason for the withdrawal. Paradorn Prissanananthakul Second Deputy Speaker of 2023 Thai House of Representatives and 8 Bhumjaithai ministers resign after the party left the coalition

==== United Thai Nation ====
The United Thai Nation Party, another member of the coalition government, has been described by political observers as "waiting to collapse". This includes 17 to 18 members of the current coalition government.

=== 19 June 2025 ===
On 19 June 2025, the Thai Ministry of Foreign Affairs summoned Cambodian ambassador to Thailand Hun Saroeun and submitted a formal protest regarding the leaked recording, calling Cambodia's actions "a breach of diplomatic etiquette, a serious violation of trust, and undermines conduct between two neighboring countries."

Prime Minister Paetongtarn Shinawatra held a press conference alongside senior military officials and apologized for the leaked phone call. She stated her comments were meant to aid private negotiations for peace and reiterated that she was not opposed to the military.

Natthaphong Ruengpanyawut, the leader of the People's Party, Thailand's main opposition party, as well as the Leader of the Opposition, publicly called on Prime Minister Paetongtarn Shinawatra to dissolve parliament.

=== 20 June 2025 ===
Three coalition parties, United Thai Nation, Democrat, and Chartthaipattana, held their own discussions to decide if they should continue in the government. The Democrat party and Chartthaipatana announced they will incline to remain in the coalition government.

The United Thai Nation Party faction, led by their leader Pirapan Salirathavibhaga, has reiterated its demand for Prime Minister Paetongtarn's resignation. The Pheu Thai party has rejected this, stating the Prime Minister will remain in office and the House will not be dissolved, despite Bhumjaithai's departure from the coalition.

United Thai Nation Party's 36 MPs are divided, with only Pirapan's 18-MP faction supporting the call for resignation. Current deputy minister of commerce, Suchart Chomklin's faction are still weighting their options. If Pirapan's faction withdraw, the coalition government would lose its parliamentary majority, shifting the balance from 261–234 to 243–252.

PM Paetongtarn visited troops stationed along the Thai-Cambodian border in Ubon Ratchathani and spoke with Lieutenant General Boonsin Phadklang, the Second Army Area Commander.

Senate Speaker Mongkol Surasajja has formally requested that the National Anti-Corruption Commission and the Constitutional Court investigate the prime minister. The investigation pertains to alleged gross ethical misconduct related to a recently leaked conversation between Paetongtarn and Cambodia's Hun Sen.

The government issued a statement in which Prime Minister Paetongtarn apologized to the public over the leaked phone call with Hun Sen and reaffirms commitment to national sovereignty.

=== 22 June 2025 ===
It is confirmed that the Constitution Court of Thailand will review preliminary examination of the petition.

On 22 June 2025, Prime Minister Paetongtarn, who is also leader of the Pheu Thai party, convened a crucial meeting at the Rosewood Hotel with representatives from the six remaining coalition parties. The Prime Minister thanked the Democrats, United Thai Nation, Kla Tham, Chart Thai Pattana, Prachachart, and Chart Pattana parties, all of whom confirmed their commitment to remain in the government following the recent withdrawal of the Bhumjaithai Party. Among the attendees were prominent leaders such as Chalermchai Srion (Democrat Party), Pirapan Salirathavibhaga (United Thai Nation), Tawee Sodsong (Prachachart), Varawut Silpa-archa (Chart Thai Pattana), Suwat Liptapallop (Chart Pattana), and Narumon Pinyosinwat (Kla Tham party). The meeting happened after senior official from the ruling Pheu Thai Party said that the prime minister will not resign or dissolve the parliament on 21 June 2025.

=== 23 June 2025 ===
On 23 June 2025, the Thai government announced that it would push ahead with a Cabinet reshuffle, which is expected to be finalized by 27 June 2025.

=== 24 June 2025 ===
Prime Minister Paetongtarn Shinawatra announced the completion of the new cabinet line-up, which is currently undergoing background checks before submission for Royal assent. The coalition government now comprises Pheu Thai, Democrat, United Thai Nation, Prachachart, Kla Tham, Chart Thai Pattana, and Chart Pattana.

The National Anti-Corruption Commission (NACC) has opened a preliminary investigation into Prime Minister Paetongtarn Shinawatra. The investigation concerns alleged serious violations of the code of ethics stemming from a controversial conversation with Cambodian Senate President Hun Sen regarding the Thai-Cambodian border dispute.

=== 27 June 2025 ===
The Constitutional Court of Thailand has moved its next meeting to 1 July (from 8 July) due to scheduling conflicts. The key focus of this meeting will be the consideration of a petition from 36 senators that seeks to disqualify Prime Minister Paetongtarn Shinawatra. The petition alleges she committed a serious ethical violation.

=== 29 June 2025 ===
During a 28 June protest against the government, a prominent protest leader notably expressed openness to a coup as a means to stabilize the government, a sentiment that subsequently drew condemnation from both the opposition People's Party and the ruling Pheu Thai Party.

=== 30 June 2025 ===
On 30 June 2025, the Royal Gazette formally published a cabinet reshuffle proposed by the ruling Pheu Thai party, following the Bhumjaithai party's withdrawal from the coalition government. In this new lineup, Paetongtarn Shinawatra has taken on the role of Culture Minister. The reshuffle included the appointment of nine new ministers to the cabinet.

== Suspension and calls to dissolve parliament ==
On 1 July 2025, the Constitutional Court of Thailand suspended Prime Minister Paetongtarn Shinawatra from duty by a vote of 7–2, pending a case seeking her dismissal. The court accepted a petition from 36 senators accusing her of dishonesty and breaching ethical standards over the leaked phone conversation with Cambodia's Hun Sen.

=== 1 July 2025 ===
Following the suspension of Prime Minister Paetongtarn Shinawatra from duty by the Constitutional Court on 1 July 2025, Suriya Juangroongruangkit assumed the role of acting Prime Minister of Thailand. He took on this role in his capacity as a Deputy Prime Minister, following the established order of succession within the cabinet. The opposition People's Party reacted by calling on Suriya to dissolve parliament. People's Party leader Natthaphong Ruengpanyawut stated that dissolving parliament and holding new elections was the "only legitimate solution" to the ongoing crisis, expressing the party's readiness for snap elections if called.

=== 3 July 2025 ===
Acting Prime Minister Suriya Juangroongruangkit leads the new cabinet in the swearing-in oath ceremony before the King of Thailand. His brief tenure as acting prime minister, which effectively lasted one full day, concluded shortly after this ceremony. Following the swearing-in and a subsequent special cabinet meeting, Phumtham Wechayachai assumed the role of acting Prime Minister due to his higher rank in the reshuffled cabinet.

Meanwhile, the People's Party officially welcomed the Bhumjaithai Party into the opposition bloc in parliament. Leaders of five opposition parties, including People's Party leader Natthaphong Ruengpanyawut and Bhumjaithai leader Anutin Charnvirakul, held their first joint meeting of the new parliamentary session. Bhumjaithai leader Anutin Charnvirakul vowed that his party would "fully scrutinise the government" in its new role as an opposition party.

== Removal and new government formation ==
=== 29 August 2025 ===
The verdict was scheduled for 15:00 (Thailand Standard Time), Friday, 29 August 2025. The Constitutional court voted by a margin of 6:3 to remove Paetongtarn Shinawatra from office. In the hours that followed, the People's Party announced a deal to form a new, interim government with any willing political party in order to break the political deadlock. In the deal, the People's Party outlined 3 points which the new government must accomplish. These are for the People's Party to act as Confidence and Supply and not as an actual coalition partner, to amend the constitution and to dissolve the Parliament for a re-election in 4 months. They were quickly approached by the Bhumjaithai Party, who "accepted the People's Party's deal and will approach other political parties for support." On the other hand, the People's Party said that the deal has not been closed yet and that negotiations were still ongoing. They also said that they would be open to the same deal with Pheu Thai, who had not contacted them yet.

=== 30 August 2025 ===
In response to Bhumjaithai's deal with the People's Party, Acting Prime Minister Phumtham Wechayachai questioned Bhumjaithai's ability to form a competing government and said that Pheu Thai had begun contacting the People's party. He also claimed that he has the ability to dissolve parliament, and that "if we wanted to dissolve [the parliament], we could dissolve immediately."

=== 31 August 2025 ===
Acting Prime Minister Phumtham Wechayachai, as well as other representatives of the Pheu Thai and Democrat parties, entered formal negotiations with the People's Party. Speaking on behalf of the Pheu Thai party, Phumtham said that he accepted the points proposed by the People's Party, but did not mention whether the People's Party will accept the deal with Pheu Thai or not. Meanwhile, Natthaphong Ruengpanyawut, leader of the People's Party, said that the party would make a decision by September 1.

=== 1 September 2025 ===
The People's Party had not been able to come to a decision during the meeting on September 1. Another meeting would be held the next day. Later, the People's party held an opinion poll of its party members over the decision

=== 3 September 2025 ===
==== People's Party ====
The People's Party announced that it will be voting for Bhumjaithai Party to be the new interim government, with Anutin Charnvirakul as Prime Minister. In addition to the People's party's three previous points, 2 more were added, that is that if a referendum for amending the constitution is held, it must be done before the next election, and if a referendum is not held, all processes to amend the constitution must be done by the current parliament. Bhumjaithai must also not attempt any political move that would put it as a majority government, and must stay as a minority government throughout its administration.

==== Bhumjaithai party ====
Later in the same day, the Bhumjaithai party announced in a press conference it has successfully gathered 146 MPs to form a minority government, and Anutin Charnvirakul signed the document outlining the 5 points agreed upon by Bhumjaithai and the People's Party.

==== Dissolution request ====
On the same day, Phumtham has revealed that he had requested the royal assent for the dissolution of parliament, which lead to accusation of lèse-majesté against Phumtham.

=== 4 September 2025 ===
A personal Bombardier Global 7500 owned by a former Prime Minister Thaksin Shinawatra deviated from the intended route toward Singapore.

=== 5 September 2025 ===
==== Rejected dissolution request ====
Phumtham has revealed that the request for parliament dissolution was rejected.

==== Thaksin ====
Thaksin's personal jet landed in Dubai. He claimed to be headed there for medical purposes after his original destination in Singapore denied entry. He also said that he would return to Thailand no later than September 8 to be present at his court hearing on September 9.

==== Anutin elected prime minister ====
As the parliament prepared to vote on the 32nd prime minister, a Pheu Thai member revealed that he had filed a report to the constitutional court against Anutin over allegations of his party's involvement in the Senate election scandal. Following a parliamentary vote, Anutin was elected prime minister with a total of 311 votes, while the Pheu Thai nominee, Chaikasem Nitisiri, received 152 votes.

=== 8 September 2025 ===
Thaksin returned to Thailand via his private jet.

=== 9 September 2025 ===
Thaksin was sentenced to 1 year in prison. He was imprisoned in Klong Prem Central Prison, Chatuchak district, Bangkok.

== Protests ==
On Thursday, 19 June 2025, the People and Student Network for the Reform of Thailand (NSPRT), joined by the Dhamma Army and led by figures such as Pichit Chaimongkol, staged a protest near Government House in Bangkok. The demonstration called for the resignation of Prime Minister Paetongtarn Shinawatra following the leak of a phone conversation between her and Cambodian Senate President Hun Sen. Protesters accused the Prime Minister of compromising Thailand's national interests in the phone call.

On 20 June 2025, a coalition of protical pressure groups under the Ruam Palang Phaendin demanded PM's resignation, and announced plan to protest on 28 June 2025 from 4 p.m. to 9 p.m. at Victory Monument (Bangkok). The protest is organized by Yam Fao Paendin Foundation has received about 10 million baht in public donations so far to fund the protest. Donations are being accepted until 29 June 2025.

On 28 June 2025, police estimated approximately 6,000 people participated in a protest at Victory Monument, demanding the Prime Minister's resignation.

== Poll ==
A National Institute of Development Administration (Nida) poll conducted from 19 to 25 June 2025, reveals a significant decline in popularity for Prime Minister Paetongtarn Shinawatra and the Pheu Thai Party, with her approval rating dropping to 9.20%.

== Impact ==
A collapse of the Pheu Thai-led coalition could lead to the party replacing Paetongtarn with a third Pheu Thai prime ministerial cabinet. Paetongtarn could likewise call for the dissolution of parliament and a new general election, or face a vote of no confidence in the House of Representatives. Some political commentators have highlighted the increased possibility of a military coup.
