= List of presidents of the National Legislative Assembly of Thailand =

Presiding officers within the National Legislative Assembly of Thailand

President of the National Legislative Assembly
- ประธานสภานิติบัญญัติแห่งชาติ
- Seal of the Parliament

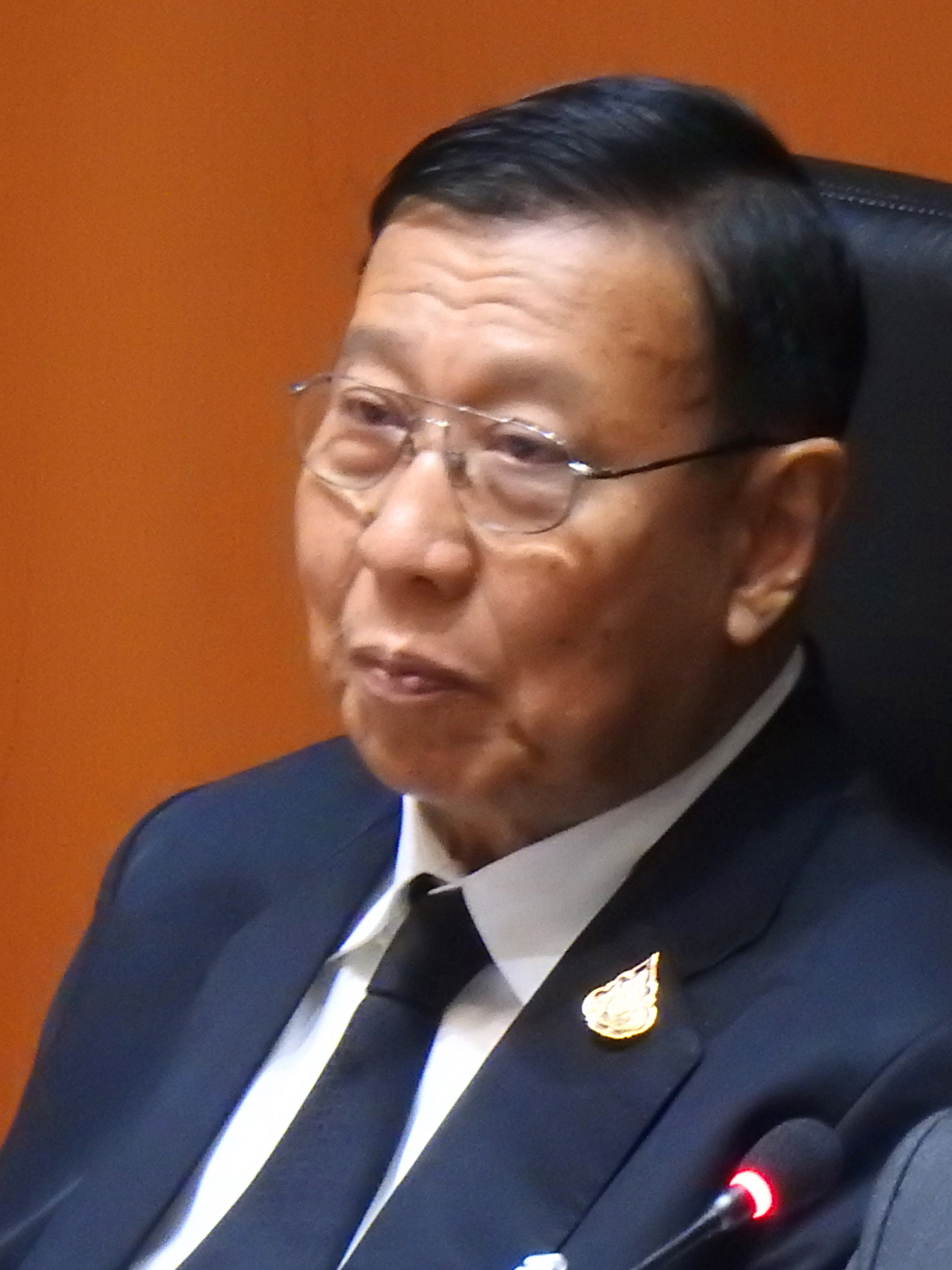
- Last holder Pornpetch Wichitcholchai; 17 August 2014 – 21 May 2019
- National Assembly; National Legislative Assembly
- Style: Mr. President (informal); The Honourable (formal); His Excellency (diplomatic)
- Status: Presiding officer
- Member of: Cabinet of Thailand; National Security Council
- Seat: Parliament House
- Nominator: National Legislative Assembly
- Appointer: King of Thailand (by royal command)
- Term length: until the dissolution of the assembly
- Constituting instrument: Constitution of Thailand
- Formation: 18 December 1972; 53 years ago
- First holder: Siri Siriyothin
- Final holder: Pornpetch Wichitcholchai
- Abolished: 21 May 2019; 7 years ago
- Deputy: Vice President of the National Legislative Assembly
- Salary: ฿125,590 per month ($4,044 USD)
- Website: www.parliament.go.th

The president of the National Legislative Assembly of Thailand was the presiding officer within the National Legislative Assembly.

== List of presidents of the National Legislative Assembly ==
#	President	Start of service	End of service
1	Siri Siriyothin	18 December 1972	11 December 1973
2	Kukrit Pramoj	29 December 1973	7 October 1974
3	Praphas Ouchai	17 October 1974	25 January 1975
4	Harin Hongsakul	25 November 1977	22 April 1979
5	Ukrit Mongkolnavin	2 April 1991	21 March 1992
6	Meechai Ruchuphan	25 October 2006	28 January 2008
7	Pornpetch Wichitcholchai	17 August 2014	21 May 2019
