= Chaichanok Chidchob =

Thai politician

- ไชยชนก ชิดชอบ
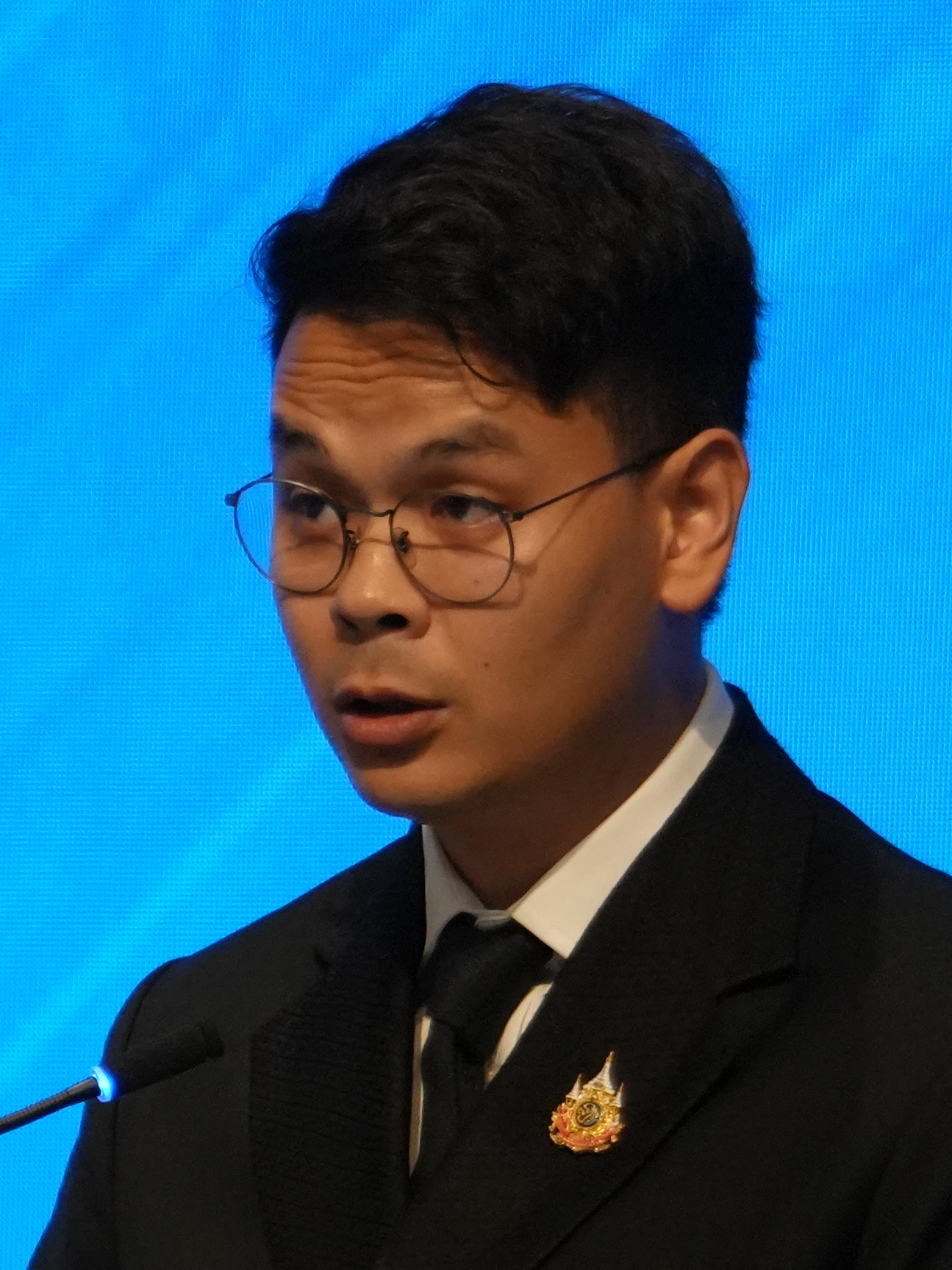
- Chaichanok in 2025

Minister of Digital Economy and Society
- Incumbent
- Assumed office 19 September 2025
- Prime Minister: Anutin Charnvirakul
- Preceded by: Prasert Jantararuangtong

Secretary-General of the Bhumjaithai Party
- Incumbent
- Assumed office 24 March 2024
- Preceded by: Saksayam Chidchob

Member of the House of Representatives
- Incumbent
- Assumed office 14 May 2023

Personal details
- Born: 14 July 1990 (age 36) Buriram, Thailand
- Party: Bhumjaithai
- Relations: Newin Chidchob (father)

Chaichanok Chidchob (Thai: ไชยชนก ชิดชอบ, RTGS: Chaichanok Chitchop; born 14 July 1990) is a Thai politician, serving as the secretary-general of the Bhumjaithai Party since 2024 and a Member of Parliament since 2023.

== Early life and education ==
A member of the Chidchob family, Chaichanok is the eldest son of Newin Chidchob, Minister to the Office of the Prime Minister from 2005 to 2006, and grandson of Chai Chidchob, Speaker of the House of Representatives and President of the National Assembly of Thailand from 2008 to 2011. Born in Buriram province, Chaichanok was sent to attend Millfield School in Glastonbury, England. He went on to obtain a degree in Economics and Finance from City St George's, University of London, before returning to Thailand after 17 years away. After briefly serving in the Thai military at the age of 25, he went on to hold multiple positions at Buriram United.

== Career ==
In April 2025, Chaichanok voiced opposition to the draft Entertainment Complex Bill, which would legalize casinos and gambling in Thailand.

== Royal decoration ==
2024 – Knight Commander (Second Class) of the Most Noble Order of the Crown of Thailand
