= President of the National Assembly of Thailand =

Head of national assembly of thailand

President of the National Assembly
- ประธานรัฐสภา
- Seal of the Parliament of Thailand

- Standard of the president of the National Assembly of Thailand

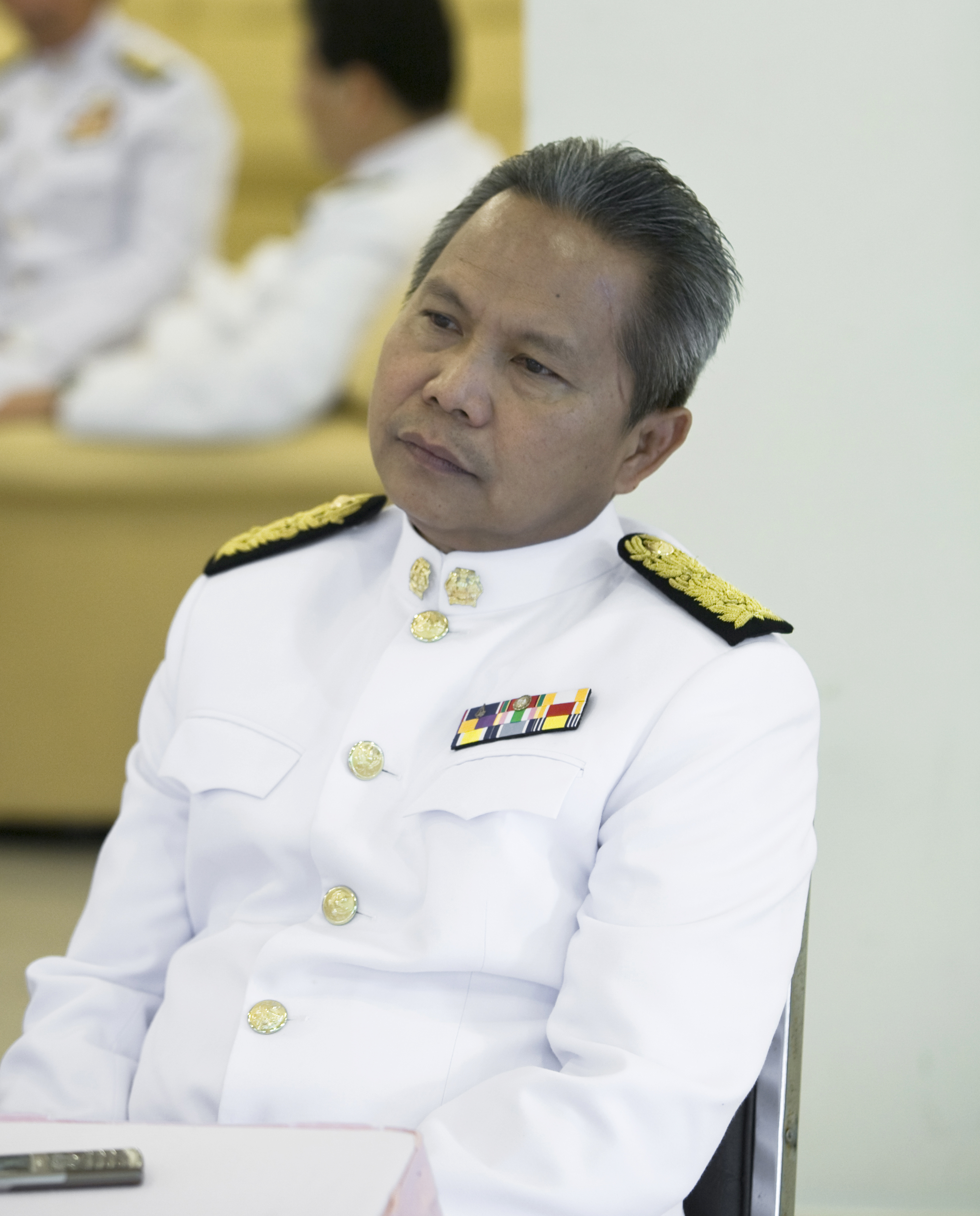
- Incumbent; Sophon Saram since 16 March 2026
- National Assembly
- Style: Mr. President / Than Prathan Thi Khao Rop
- Status: Presiding officer
- Member of: National Assembly; House of Representatives
- Seat: Sappaya-Sapasathan
- Nominator: Vote within the House of Representatives
- Appointer: Monarch by royal command
- Term length: According to the term of the House of Representatives
- Constituting instrument: Constitution of Thailand
- Inaugural holder: Chaophraya Thammasakmontri
- Formation: 28 June 1932; 94 years ago
- Deputy: Vice President of the National Assembly
- Salary: ฿75,590 monthly

The president of the National Assembly (Thai: ประธานรัฐสภา, RTGS: Prathan Ratthasapha, pronounced [prā.tʰāːn rát.tʰā.sā.pʰāː]) is the presiding officer (speaker) of the National Assembly of Thailand. Since 1992, the office has been an ex officio position occupied by the Speaker of the House of Representatives of Thailand. The president is therefore an MP, usually from the majority party in the House of Representatives. The president is elected at the beginning of a House session immediately after an election, there are no term limits for the office. In the aftermath of the coup d'état in 2014, the function of legislative assembly was turned over to the junta-controlled National Legislative Assembly, which Pornpetch Wichitcholchai, President of the National Legislative Assembly, occupied the ex officio position of President of the National Assembly until the election of Wan Muhamad Noor Matha as Speaker of the House in 2023.

The office of the president of the National Assembly was first established in 1932, with the establishment of the first legislature of Thailand. The office of the president of the People's Assembly of Siam was first occupied by Chaophraya Thammasakmontri (Sanan Thephasadin na Ayutthaya).

== Powers and functions ==
=== As president ===
The president of the National Assembly, apart from being the presiding officer of the National Assembly whenever there is a joint-sitting, is also the chief representative and leader of the legislative branch in Thailand. In the 2017 constitution the president of the National Assembly is given many powers. The President is assisted by the Vice President of the National Assembly, another ex officio position occupied by the president of the Senate.

- Countersign the King's appointment and removal of the president of the Privy Council and Regent of Thailand.
- Countersign the Royal Command for the amendment of the 1924 Palace Law of Succession.
- Inviting the Heir to ascend the Throne.
- Ensure all votes in the Assembly is recorded.
- Asking the Monarch to convoke an extraordinary session of the Assembly.

=== As speaker ===
The speaker of the House of Representatives is the chief presiding officer of the House of Representatives. The speaker is also entrusted with some legislative powers, as it is his main role to ensure all the legislative process is followed. The speaker is assisted by two Deputy Speakers. The Speaker must act impartially on all matters and therefore cannot be a member of an executive committee of a political party, this also apply to his deputies.

- Filling a vacancy of a Party list MP, by submitting a name on the list for publication in the Royal Gazette.
- Submitting to the King the name of the Prime Minister-elect to be formally appointed, then countersigning it.
- Countersign the King's appointment of the Leader of the Opposition.
- Be an ex officio member of the Selection committee for:
  - Constitutional Court Judges
  - Election Commissioners
  - Ombudsmen
  - National Anti-Corruption Commissioners

== List of presidents ==
Note: According to the 2007 Constitution of Thailand the office of President of the National Assembly of Thailand is held as an ex officio position by the speaker of the House of Representatives. However throughout Thailand's long constitutional history this has not always been the case, at certain times the office of 'President' of the legislature was sometimes held by the presiding officer of the upper house or that of a unicameral chamber.

No.	Portrait	Name (Birth–Death)	Term of office		Party	Position
No.	Portrait	Name (Birth–Death)	Took office	Left office	Party	Position
1		Chaophraya Thammasakmontri เจ้าพระยาธรรมศักดิ์มนตรี (1877–1943)	28 June 1932	1 September 1932	Independent	President of the People's Assembly
2		Chaophraya Phichaiyat เจ้าพระยาพิชัยญาติ (1875–1946)	2 September 1932	10 December 1933	Independent	President of the People's Assembly
(1)		Chaophraya Thammasakmontri เจ้าพระยาธรรมศักดิ์มนตรี (1877–1943)	15 December 1933	26 February 1934	Independent	President of the People's Assembly
3		Phraya Sorayuthaseni พระยาศรยุทธเสนี (1888–1962)	26 February 1934	22 September 1934	People's	President of the People's Assembly
4		Chaophraya Sri Thammathibet เจ้าพระยาศรีธรรมาธิเบศ (1885–1976)	22 September 1934	31 July 1936	Independent	President of the People's Assembly
5		Phraya Manwaratchasewi พระยามานวราชเสวี (1890–1984)	3 August 1936	24 June 1943	Independent	President of the People's Assembly
(3)		Phraya Sorayuthaseni พระยาศรยุทธเสนี (1888–1962)	6 July 1943	24 June 1944	People's	President of the People's Assembly
(5)		Phraya Manwaratchasewi พระยามานวราชเสวี (1890–1984)	2 July 1944	9 May 1946	Independent	President of the People's Assembly
6		Vilas Osathanon วิลาศ โอสถานนท์ (1899–1997)	4 June 1946	24 August 1946	People's	President of the Senate
(3)		Phraya Sorayuthaseni พระยาศรยุทธเสนี (1888–1962)	31 August 1946	9 November 1947	People's	President of the Senate
(4)		Chaophraya Sri Thammathibet เจ้าพระยาศรีธรรมาธิเบศ (1885–1976)	26 November 1947	29 November 1951	Independent	President of the Senate
7		Phra Prachonpachanuk พระประจนปัจจนึก (1892–1970)	1 December 1951	16 September 1957	Independent	Speaker of the House of Representatives
8		Luang Sutthisanronnakon หลวงสุทธิสารรณกร (1901–1968)	20 September 1957	14 December 1957	Independent	Speaker of the House of Representatives
(7)		Phra Prachonpachanuk พระประจนปัจจนึก (1892–1970)	27 December 1957	20 October 1958	Independent	Speaker of the House of Representatives
(8)		Luang Sutthisanronnakon หลวงสุทธิสารรณกร (1901–1968)	6 February 1959	2 May 1968	Independent	President of the Constitution Drafting Assembly
9		Thawi Bunyaket ทวี บุณยเกตุ (1904–1971)	8 May 1968	20 June 1968	Independent	President of the Constitution Drafting Assembly
10		Nai Vorkarnbancha นายวรการบัญชา (1903–1974)	22 July 1968	17 November 1971	Independent	President of the Senate
11		Siri Siriyothin ศิริ สิริโยธิน (1915–1979)	18 December 1972	11 December 1973	Independent	President of the National Legislative Assembly
12		Kukrit Pramoj คึกฤทธิ์ ปราโมช (1911–1995)	29 December 1973	7 October 1974	Independent	President of the National Legislative Assembly
13		Praphas Ouchai ประภาศน์ อวยชัย (1924–2017)	17 October 1974	25 January 1975	Independent	President of the National Legislative Assembly
14		Prasit Kanchanawat ประสิทธิ์ กาญจนวัฒน์ (1915–1999)	7 February 1975	12 January 1976	Social Nationalist	Speaker of the House of Representatives
—		Chitti Tingsabadh จิตติ ติงศภัทิย์ (1908–1995); Acting	12 January 1976	19 April 1976	Independent	President of the Senate
15		Uthai Pimjaichon อุทัย พิมพ์ใจชน (born 1938)	19 April 1976	6 October 1976	Democrat	Speaker of the House of Representatives
16		Kamol Dechatungka กมล เดชะตุงคะ (1917–2002)	22 October 1976	20 November 1976	Independent	President of the National Administrative Reform Council
17		Harin Hongsakul หะริน หงสกุล (1914–2008)	28 November 1976	20 October 1977	Independent	President of the National Administrative Reform Council
17		Harin Hongsakul หะริน หงสกุล (1914–2008)	25 November 1977	20 April 1979	Independent	President of the National Legislative Assembly
17		Harin Hongsakul หะริน หงสกุล (1914–2008)	9 May 1979	19 March 1983	Independent	President of the Senate
18		Charubud Ruengsuwan จารุบุตร เรืองสุวรรณ (1920–1984)	26 April 1983	19 March 1984	Independent	President of the Senate
—		Uthai Pimjaichon อุทัย พิมพ์ใจชน (born 1938); Acting	19 March 1984	30 April 1984	Progress	Speaker of the House of Representatives
19		Ukrit Mongkolnavin อุกฤษ มงคลนาวิน (born 1933)	30 April 1984	21 April 1989	Independent	President of the Senate
—		Panja Kesornthong ปัญจะ เกสรทอง (born 1946); Acting	21 April 1989	4 May 1989	Thai Nation	Speaker of the House of Representatives
20		Wan Chansue วรรณ ชันซื่อ (1923–2015)	4 May 1989	23 February 1991	Independent	President of the Senate
(19)		Ukrit Mongkolnavin อุกฤษ มงคลนาวิน (born 1933)	2 April 1991	21 March 1992	Independent	President of the National Legislative Assembly
(19)		Ukrit Mongkolnavin อุกฤษ มงคลนาวิน (born 1933)	3 April 1992	26 May 1992	Independent	President of the Senate
—		Arthit Ourairat อาทิตย์ อุไรรัตน์ (born 1938); Acting	26 May 1992	28 June 1992	Justice Unity	Speaker of the House of Representatives
21		Meechai Ruchuphan (Note: Meechai Ruchuphan was leave office from the President of the National Assembly on 29 June 1992 due to amendments to the Constitution, howerver Prime Minister Anand Panyarachun dissolution the House of Representatives, making Meechai the Acting President of the National Assembly between 30 June 1992 and 22 September 1992.) มีชัย ฤชุพันธุ์ (born 1938)	28 June 1992	29 June 1992	Independent	President of the Senate
—		Meechai Ruchuphan มีชัย ฤชุพันธุ์ (born 1938)	30 June 1992	22 September 1992	Independent	President of the Senate
22		Marut Bunnag มารุต บุนนาค (1924–2022)	22 September 1992	19 May 1995	Democrat	Speaker of the House of Representatives
—		Meechai Ruchuphan มีชัย ฤชุพันธุ์ (born 1938); Acting	19 May 1995	11 July 1995	Independent	President of the Senate
23		Booneua Prasertsuwan บุญเอื้อ ประเสริฐสุวรรณ (1919–2016)	11 July 1995	27 September 1996	Thai Nation	Speaker of the House of Representatives
—		Meechai Ruchuphan มีชัย ฤชุพันธุ์ (born 1938); Acting	27 September 1996	24 November 1996	Independent	President of the Senate
24		Wan Muhamad Noor Matha วันมูหะมัดนอร์ มะทา (born 1944)	24 November 1996	27 June 2000	New Aspiration	Speaker of the House of Representatives
25		Bhichai Rattakul พิชัย รัตตกุล (1924–2022)	30 June 2000	9 November 2000	Democrat	Speaker of the House of Representatives
—		Sanit Vorapanya สนิท วรปัญญา (born 1939); Acting	9 November 2000	6 February 2001	Independent	President of the Senate
(15)		Uthai Pimjaichon อุทัย พิมพ์ใจชน (born 1938)	6 February 2001	5 January 2005	Thai Rak Thai	Speaker of the House of Representatives
—		Suchon Chaleekure สุชน ชาลีเครือ (born 1933); Acting	5 January 2005	8 March 2005	Independent	President of the Senate
26		Pokin Palakul โภคิน พลกุล (born 1952)	8 March 2005	24 February 2006	Thai Rak Thai	Speaker of the House of Representatives
—		Suchon Chaleekure สุชน ชาลีเครือ (born 1933); Acting	24 February 2006	19 September 2006	Independent	President of the Senate
(21)		Meechai Ruchuphan มีชัย ฤชุพันธุ์ (born 1938)	25 October 2006	24 January 2008	Independent	President of the National Legislative Assembly
27		Yongyuth Tiyapairat ยงยุทธ ติยะไพรัช (born 1961)	24 January 2008	30 April 2008	People's Power	Speaker of the House of Representatives
—		Prasopsuk Bundech ประสพสุข บุญเดช (born 1945); Acting	30 April 2008	15 May 2008	Independent	President of the Senate
28		Chai Chidchob ชัย ชิดชอบ (1928–2020)	15 May 2008	10 May 2011	People's Power (until 2008)	Speaker of the House of Representatives
28		Chai Chidchob ชัย ชิดชอบ (1928–2020)	15 May 2008	10 May 2011	Bhumjaithai (from 2008)	Speaker of the House of Representatives
—		Teeradej Meepien ธีรเดช มีเพียร (born 1940); Acting	10 May 2011	3 August 2011	Independent	President of the Senate
29		Somsak Kiatsuranont สมศักดิ์ เกียรติสุรนนท์ (born 1954)	3 August 2011	9 December 2013	Pheu Thai	Speaker of the House of Representatives
—		Nikom Wairatpanij นิคม ไวยรัชพานิช (born 1947); Acting	9 December 2013	20 March 2014	Independent	President of the Senate
—		Surachai Leangboonleodchai สุรชัย เลี้ยงบุญเลิศชัย (born 1953); Acting	21 March 2014	24 May 2014	Independent	Acting President of the Senate
30		Pornpetch Wichitcholchai พรเพชร วิชิตชลชัย (born 1948)	17 August 2014	21 May 2019	Independent	President of the National Legislative Assembly
31		Chuan Leekpai ชวน หลีกภัย (born 1938)	28 May 2019	20 March 2023	Democrat	Speaker of the House of Representatives
—		Pornpetch Wichitcholchai พรเพชร วิชิตชลชัย (born 1948); Acting	20 March 2023	5 July 2023	Independent	President of the Senate
(24)		Wan Muhamad Noor Matha วันมูหะมัดนอร์ มะทา (born 1944)	5 July 2023	12 December 2025	Prachachat	Speaker of the House of Representatives
—		Mongkol Surasajja มงคล สุระสัจจะ (born 1952); Acting	12 December 2025	16 March 2026	Independent	President of the Senate
32		Sophon Saram โสภณ ซารัมย์ (born 1959)	16 March 2026	Incumbent	Bhumjaithai	Speaker of the House of Representatives

== See also ==
- National Assembly of Thailand
- Senate of Thailand
- House of Representatives of Thailand
- List of presidents of the Senate of Thailand
- List of speakers of the House of Representatives of Thailand
