= Keskamol Pleansamai =

- เกศกมล เปลี่ยนสมัย

Member of the Senate of Thailand
- In office 10 July 2024 – 29 July 2025

Keskamol Pleansamai (Thai: เกศกมล เปลี่ยนสมัย; born 11 October 1979) is a Thai businesswoman and politician, currently serving as a Member of the Senate of Thailand since 2024.

== Education and career ==
Keskamol claims to hold a PhD in resources management and development from Maejo University and a PhD in business administration from California University Foreign Credentials Evaluation (FCE). California University FCE does not issue degrees, but issues certificates based on applicant's education and career experience.

She has been verified to hold a medical degree from Rangsit University.

She is the owner of four beauty companies in Thailand: Keskamol Clinic Intergroup, Keskamol Dental Clinic, Inter Derma Laboratory and Medical Pharma.

== Political career ==
In the 2024 Thai Senate election, she competed within the Freelance Workers group, rather than the Public Health group.

In September 2024, Keskamol proposed establishing a regulatory body to monitor content on social media and for legal action to be taken against those who post illegal or harmful content. Her proposal was criticized by Nanthasit Nitmetha, president of the Society of Online News Providers (SONP), who argued that regulating influences would restrict freedom of speech.

== Controversy ==
Keskamol's education credentials were called into question by former senatorial candidate Sonthiya Sawasdee in July 2024. She is currently facing a probe by the Election Commission to determine the authenticity of her PhD from California University FCE, which is not an accredited university in the United States or Thailand. Thailand's Office of the Civil Service Commission and the United States only recognizes the University of California and California State University.

In a July 10 interview with Nation TV, Keskamol claimed that California University FCE was recognized by the US Department of Education.

On 22 July 2025, the Election Commission ruled against Keskamol for using false academic titles during her campaign. The Commission later submitted their petition to the Supreme Court.

On 30 July 2025, the Supreme Court announced it would hear a case brought by the Election Commission against Keskamol.
