= President of the National Legislative Assembly =

President of the National Legislative Assembly may refer to:

- President of the National Legislative Assembly (France; see National Legislative Assembly (France) § Presidents
- President of the National Legislative Assembly (Thailand); see List of presidents of the National Legislative Assembly of Thailand
