= 2024 Thai Senate election scandal =

Political scandal

The 2024 Thai Senate election scandal is a political scandal involving members of the Senate of Thailand elected in 2024. The scandal includes allegations of systemic fraud and vote buying by over 100 senators. The scandal is being investigated by two probes, including the Election Commission (EC) and the Department of Special Investigation (DSI).

== Background ==
The 2024 Thai Senate elections held from 9 to 26 June 2024 was the first senatorial elections held under the 2017 Constitution. Of the 200 senators elected, 153 are described as "Blue Senators" affiliated with the Bhumjaithai Party, 19 as "New Breed Senators" in more liberal and progressive camps, and 28 unaffiliated members.

== Investigation ==
On 6 March 2025, the DSI announced it would launch a probe of unlawful gatherings and related money laundering related to the 2024 election. Earlier in February, Senate Speaker Mongkol Surasajja expressed strong opposition to any DSI probe into the election.

On 19 March 2025, the EC announced it had created a 26th subcommittee to investigate election fraud complaints.

On 7 May 2025, the EC was reported to be planning to charge 60 members of the Senate with charges related to vote-fixing in the 2024 election.

On 9 May 2025, the EC delivered summonses to 6 of 53 senators being investigated for vote-rigging. The 6 senators, all representing Bangkok, were Alongkot Vorakee, Chokchai Kittithanesuan, Jirasak Chookhwamdee, Pibulat Haruehanprakan, Wuttichart Kalyanamitra, and Phisut Rattanawong. 47 more senators representating the provinces were awaiting summonses.

On 14 May 2025, the DSI announced there were around 1,200 suspects under investigation under their probe examining money laundering during the 2024 election.

== See also ==
2026 Thai Senate election protests
