= Marut Bunnag =

Thai politician (1924–2022)

- มารุต บุนนาค
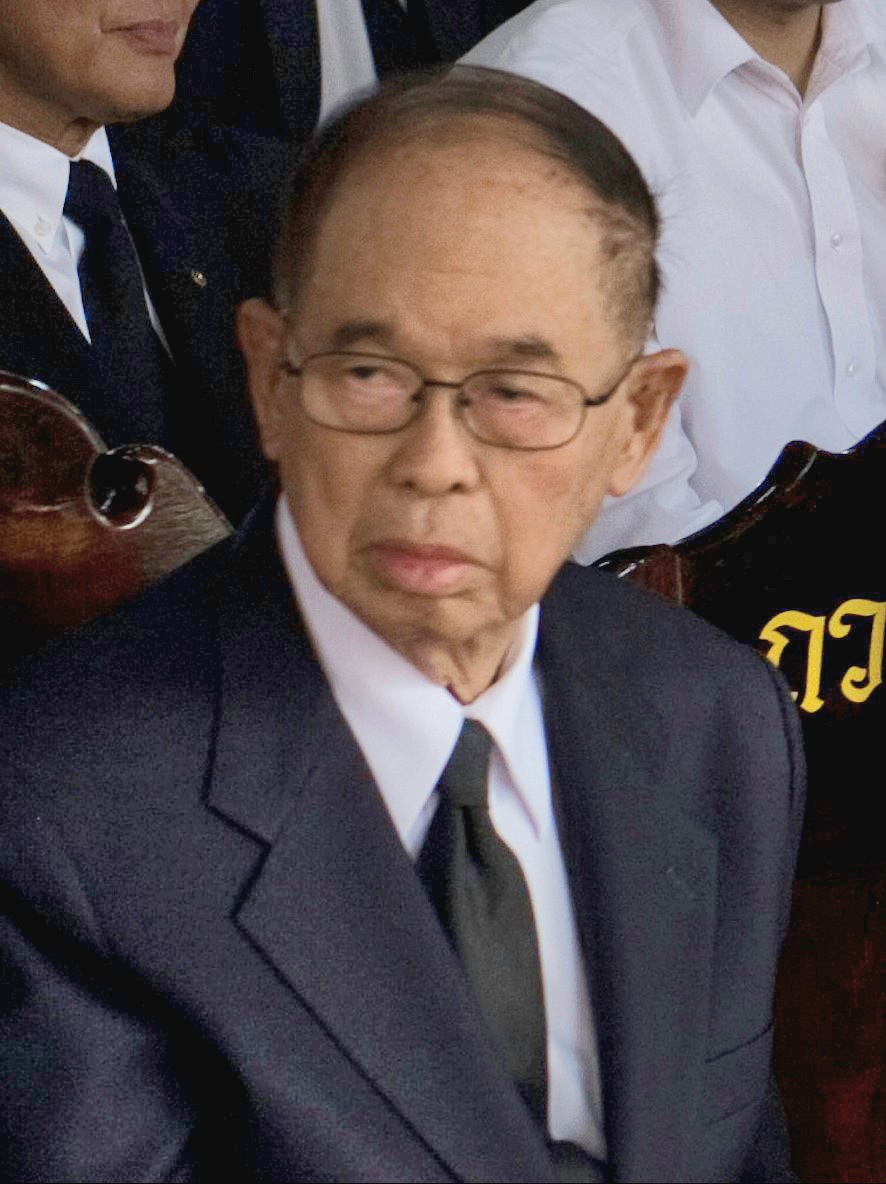
- Bunnag in 2010

Speaker of the House of Representatives and President of the National Assembly of Thailand
- In office 22 September 1992 – 18 May 1995
- Monarch: Bhumibol Adulyadej
- Prime Minister: Chuan Leekpai
- Preceded by: Meechai Ruchuphan (President of the Senate)
- Succeeded by: Booneua Prasertsuwan

Minister of Education
- In office 11 August 1986 – 9 August 1988
- Prime Minister: Prem Tinsulanonda
- Preceded by: Chuan Leekpai
- Succeeded by: Mana Rattanakoset

Minister of Justice
- In office 11 March 1981 – 19 March 1983
- Prime Minister: Prem Tinsulanonda
- Preceded by: Chuan Leekpai
- Succeeded by: Pipob Asitirat

Minister of Health
- In office 29 December 1989 – 22 November 1990
- Prime Minister: Chatichai Choonhavan
- Preceded by: Chuan Leekpai
- Succeeded by: Prachuab Chaiyasan

Personal details
- Born: 21 August 1924 Phra Nakhon, Siam
- Died: 23 September 2022 (aged 98) Bangkok, Thailand
- Party: Democrat Party
- Education: Thammasat University
- Occupation: Professor

Marut Bunnag (Thai: มารุต บุนนาค; 21 August 1924 – 23 September 2022) was a Thai politician. A member of the Democrat Party, he served as Speaker of the House of Representatives from 1992 to 1995.

== Early life and education ==
Marut was born on 21 August 1924 as the son of Phra Suthisan Winitchai (Mali Bunnag) with Phongsri Bunnag. He attended high school Debsirin School and graduated from Faculty of Law, Thammasat University in 1947 and received an honorary doctorate degree in law from Thammasat University and also Honorary Doctorate Degree in Laws Ramkhamhaeng University.

== Political careers ==
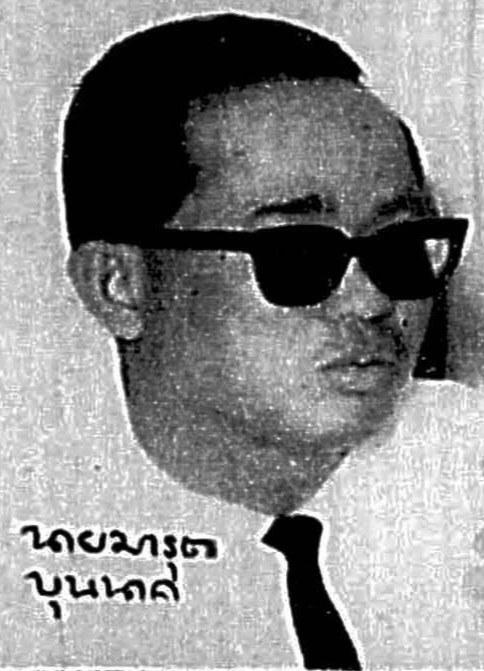
Bunnag in 1972

Marut had experience working as a lawyer before entering politics by being appointed as a member of the National Legislative Assembly in 1973 and a member of the Senate in 1975 after the events of 1973 Thai popular uprising, he later entered the Democrat Party and run for elections in Bangkok District 2 (Phayathai and Pom Prap Sattru Phai Districts) in the election in 1979, but was not elected. Later in 1983, Marut ran for election again and this time he was successful and was elected as an MP in Bangkok ever since.

He was elected as Secretary-General of the Democrat Party during the era of Thanat Khoman as the party's leader.

== Lawyer careers ==
Marut established a law firm named Marut Bunnag International Law Office, it is one of the oldest international law firms in Thailand.

== Death ==
Marut died in Bangkok on 23 September 2022, at the age of 98.
