= Saksayam Chidchob =

Thai politician (born 1962)

- ศักดิ์สยาม ชิดชอบ
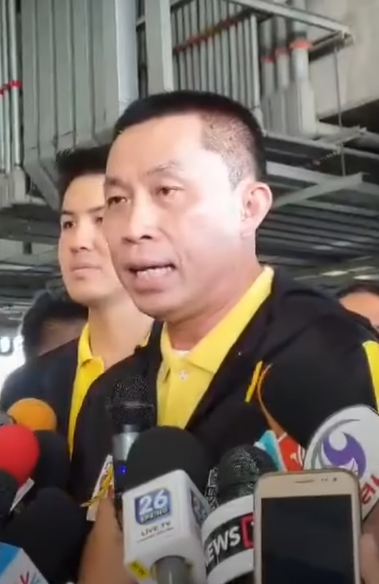

Minister of Transport
- In office 10 July 2019 – 3 March 2023
- Prime Minister: Prayut Chan-o-cha
- Preceded by: Arkhom Termpittayapaisith
- Succeeded by: Suriya Juangroongruangkit

Secretary-General of the Bhumjaithai Party
- In office 14 October 2012 – 17 January 2024
- Preceded by: Pornthiwa Nakasai
- Succeeded by: Chaichanok Chidchob

Member of the House of Representatives
- In office 24 March 2019 – 17 January 2024
- Constituency: Party-list
- In office 6 January 2001 – 24 February 2006
- Constituency: Buriram 3rd district

Personal details
- Born: 9 November 1962 (age 63) Surin, Thailand
- Party: Bhumjaithai
- Parent: Chai Chidchob (father)
- Relatives: Newin Chidchob (brother) Permpoon Chidchob (brother)
- Education: Thammasat University; National Institute of Development Administration
- Profession: Politician

Saksayam Chidchob (Thai: ศักดิ์สยาม ชิดชอบ, RTGS: Saksayam Chitchop; born 9 November 1962) is a Thai politician who served as Minister of Transport in the second cabinet of Prime Minister Prayut Chan-o-cha.

== Early life and education ==
Born on 9 November 1962 in Surin province, he is the son of former Speakers of the House of Representatives Chai Chidchob and La-ong Chidchob and also younger brother of Newin Chidchob. S. completed secondary education from Suankularb Wittayalai School and then Bachelor in Political Science from Thammasat University in 1984 and a Master's degree in Political Science from the National Institute of Development Administration in 1988.

== Careers ==
S. used to serve in the position of Deputy District Chief under the Department of Provincial Administration, Ministry of Interior. Later he ran for election as a member of the House of Representatives in 2001 and 2005. Then he was appointed as Chairman of the Working Group of the minister of interior Kowit Wattana. Later in 2007, his political rights were disqualified for five years as the executive director of the Thai Rak Thai Party, which was dissolved in the 2006 dissolution of political parties.

In the government of Abhisit Vejjajiva, S. was appointed Chairman of the Working Group of Minister of Interior Chavarat Charnvirakul on 17 September 2009.

Saksayam has applied to be a member of the Bhumjai Thai Party in 2012 after the expiration of the political rights disqualification and was elected as Secretary-General of the Bhumjai Thai Party on October 14, 2012.

In the government of Prayut Chan-o-cha was appointed Minister of Transport. Constitutional Court suspended him from performing his duties on 3 March 2023 pending the court's decision on his asset concealment.

== Personal life ==
On 7 April 2021, Saksayam tested positive for COVID-19. He was the first Thai cabinet minister to be infected with COVID-19.

== Royal decorations ==
- 2021 – Knight Grand Cordon (Special Class) of The Most Exalted Order of the White Elephant
- 2020 – Knight Grand Cordon (Special Class) of The Most Noble Order of the Crown of Thailand
- 1990 – 2nd Class 2nd Cat of Freeman Safeguarding Medal
- 2011 – Border Service Medal

Political offices
Preceded by Arkhom Termpittayapaisith	Minister of Transport; 2019–present	Incumbent
