= Permpoon Chidchob =

Thai politician

- เพิ่มพูน ชิดชอบ
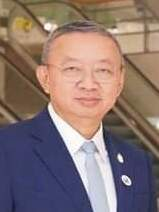
- Permpoon in 2024

Minister of Education
- In office 1 September 2023 – 19 June 2025
- Prime Minister: Srettha Thavisin; Paetongtarn Shinawatra
- Preceded by: Treenuch Thienthong
- Succeeded by: Narumon Pinyosinwat

Personal details
- Born: 5 October 1960 (age 65) Surin, Thailand
- Party: Bhumjaithai (2021-present)
- Parent(s): Chai Chidchob (father); Laong Chidlik (mother)
- Relatives: Saksayam Chidchob (brother)
- Education: Ramkhamhaeng University (LLB); National Institute of Development Administration (MPA)
- Profession: Policeman

Military service
- Branch/service: Royal Thai Police
- Years of service: 1984–2021
- Rank: Police General

Permpoon Chidchob (Thai: เพิ่มพูน ชิดชอบ, RTGS: Phoemphun Chitchop) is a Thai politician who served as minister of education from 2023 to 2025. He is the brother of Saksayam Chidchob, who served as minister of transport from 2019 to 2023, and of Newin Chidchob, who served as minister to the office of the prime minister from 2005 to 2006.
