= Newin Chidchob =

Thai former politician (born 1958)

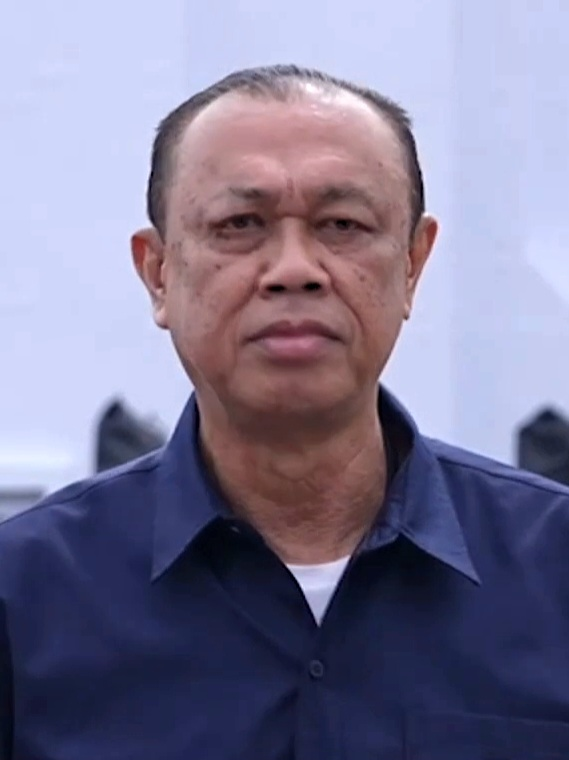
- Newin in 2024

Minister to the Office of the Prime Minister
- In office 2 August 2005 – 19 September 2006
- Prime Minister: Thaksin Shinawatra
- Preceded by: Pongthep Thepkanjana; Suwat Liptapanlop
- Succeeded by: Tipavadee Meksawan; Theerapat Serirangsan

Deputy Minister of Agriculture and Cooperatives
- In office 3 October 2002 – 2 August 2005
- Prime Minister: Thaksin Shinawatra

Deputy Minister of Commerce
- In office 5 March 2002 – 3 October 2002
- Prime Minister: Thaksin Shinawatra

Deputy Minister of Agriculture and Cooperatives
- In office 14 November 1997 – 6 January 2001
- Prime Minister: Chuan Leekpai

Deputy Minister of Finance
- In office 18 July 1995 – 23 May 1996
- Prime Minister: Banharn Silpa-archa

Personal details
- Born: 4 October 1958 (age 67) Surin, Thailand
- Party: Bhumjaithai Party (2008–2012; 2021–present)
- Other political affiliations: Solidarity (1988–1991); Justice Unity (1992); Thai Nation (1992–1996; 2000–2004); Unity (1996–2000); Thai Rak Thai (2004–2007); People's Power (2007–2008)
- Spouse: Karuna Chidchob (m. 1988)
- Relations: Permpoon Chidchob (younger brother); Saksayam Chidchob (younger brother)
- Children: 4, including Chaichanok
- Parent: Chai Chidchob (father)

Newin Chidchob (Thai: เนวิน ชิดชอบ, born 4 October 1958) is a Thai politician from Buriram Province. As a member of several political parties, Newin and his allies eventually joined the Thai Rak Thai Party of Thaksin Shinawatra in 2005. Prior to the 2006 Thai coup d'état, he served as a member of Parliament for Buriram Province and was a Cabinet Minister with the Thai Rak Thai Party. From 2002 to 2005, he was Deputy Minister of Agriculture and Agricultural Cooperatives.

Following the 2006 Thai coup d'état and the subsequent dissolution of Thai Rak Thai for corruption, Newin and his friends, mostly members of the National Assembly from the south of Isan (the northeastern region), shifted from the ruling (now also dissolved) People Power Party (PPP) to the opposition Democrat Party during the 2008 Thai political crisis. He is the leader of the so-called "Friends of Newin Group", now known as the Bhumjaithai Party. Consequently, a Democrat Party led coalition gained the majority in the National Assembly. Abhisit Vejjajiva, the Democrat Party's leader, was elected by a majority of the Parliament to be the new prime minister in December 2008.

During the political tension in April 2009 caused by pro-Thaksin groups widely known as the Red Shirts, Newin publicly blasted Thaksin, his former 'boss', as the root of the political tension due to his 'doubts' of Thaksin's loyalty towards the monarchy and the current political system of the Kingdom. Previously in 2008, Newin had wept with Thaksin when the former PM kissed the tarmac at Suvarnabhumi Airport after returning to Thailand after a self-imposed exile.

== Early life and education ==
Born to a former Speaker of the House of Representatives, Chai Chidchob, of Thai Khmer-Chinese Cambodian background, many of his ancestors were elephant drivers (mahouts). His mother La-on Chidchob was a housewife of Chinese Cambodian background, and he was the third child of six siblings.

Niwin graduated grade 7 from Trai Kham School and went on to complete secondary education at Suankularb Wittayalai School. Notable contemporaries were Watana Muangsook, Wira Somkhid, Somchai Srisutthiyakon and Somsak Jeamteerasakul.

Later, he completed a diploma in community development from Buriram Rajabhat Institute in 1987, and graduated in bachelor's degree of Agriculture and Cooperative Promotion from Sukhothai Thammathirat Open University. He received an honorary degree in public administration from Pacific Western University, Western Hawaii, USA.

== Crimes and punishments ==
On 19 June 1998, the Buriram Provincial Court handed Newin a suspended six-month jail sentence and a ฿50,000 fine in a vote-buying slander case filed by Democrat MP Karoon Sai-ngam. A year later, the Constitutional Court ruled 7-6 that Newin could keep his ministerial post.

Newin was acquitted in 2009 of involvement in the rubber sapling scandal for bid rigging, corruption and collusion.

In 2007, Newin was banned from politics for five years for being an executive of the disbanded Thai Rak Thai Party, however he continued to be active in politics despite the ban, famously engineering a coalition government with his group and the Democrat Party.

== Later life ==
In December 2009, it was announced that Newin would takeover PEA F.C. and rename it Buriram PEA F.C. In 2012, the club was renamed again to Buriram United F.C.

== Personal life ==
He was named after the Burmese former dictator Ne Win.
