= Somsak Kiatsuranont =

Thai politician (born 1954)

Somsak Kiatsuranont MPCh MWM MP
- สมศักดิ์ เกียรติสุรนนท์
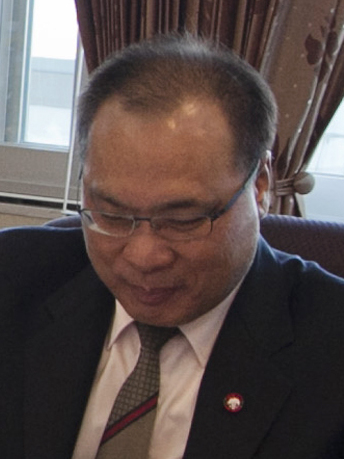
- Somsak in 2012

Speaker of the House of Representatives and President of the National Assembly of Thailand
- In office 3 August 2011 – 9 December 2013
- Monarch: Bhumibol Adulyadej
- Prime Minister: Abhisit Vejjajiva; Yingluck Shinawatra
- Preceded by: Chai Chidchob
- Succeeded by: Pornpetch Wichitcholchai (President of the National Legislative Assembly)
Ministerial offices
Minister of Justice
In office 24 September 2008 – 2 December 2008
Prime Minister	Somchai Wongsawat
Preceded by	Sompong Amornwiwat
Succeeded by	Pirapan Salirathavibhaga
Minister of Culture
In office 2 August 2008 – 9 September 2008
Prime Minister	Samak Sundaravej
Preceded by	Anusorn Wongwan
Succeeded by	Worrawat Eua-apinyakul

Member of the House of Representatives for Khon Kaen province
- In office 22 March 1992 – 9 December 2013
- Preceded by: Thongpan Phromsopha
- Succeeded by: Singhapon Deenang
- In office 24 April 1983 – 29 April 1988
- Preceded by: Chantra Janyakamnueng
- Succeeded by: Thongpan Phromsopha

Personal details
- Born: 27 June 1954 (age 72) Khon Kaen, Thailand
- Party: Pheu Thai
- Education: Khon Kaen University (B.Eng.); Chulalongkorn University (M.Eng.)
- Profession: Politician, Engineer

Somsak Kiatsuranont (Thai: สมศักดิ์ เกียรติสุรนนท์, RTGS: Somsak Kiatsuranon, IPA: [sǒm.sàk kìat.sù.rá.non]; born 27 June 1954 in Khon Kaen) is a Thai politician of the Pheu Thai Party. He served as the Speaker of the House of Representatives of Thailand, also the President of the National Assembly of Thailand ex officio, from 3 August 2011 until 9 December 2013.

== Education ==
Somsak Kiatsuranont studied engineering. He holds a bachelor's degree from Khon Kaen University, and a master's degree from Chulalongkorn University.

== Political career ==
Somsak began his political career as a Member of Parliament representing Khon Kaen. In 1997, at the time a member of the New Aspiration Party, he was Vice Speaker of the House of Representatives. During this time, he acquired the nickname "The Hammer Man" ("ขุนค้อน") for his impartiality in presiding over the House's meetings and intensive use of the presidium's gavel. Later, he was a member of the Thai Rak Thai Party of Prime Minister Thaksin Shinawatra, which was banned after the 2006 coup d'etat, and transferred into the People's Power Party (PPP). In the PPP-led government of Samak Sundaravej, Somsak was Minister of Culture from August to September 2008, and Minister of Justice in Somchai Wongsawat's cabinet from September to December 2008. Then, the PPP suffered the same fate as the Thai Rak Thai, and was dissolved by the Constitutional Court, but was revived as the Pheu Thai Party, of which Somsak Kiatsuranont has been the vice chairman since September 2010.

After the Pheu Thai Party won the 2011 general election, Somsak Kiatsuranont was elected Speaker of the House of Representatives on 2 August 2011. Somsak who exercised restraint during the 2010 Thai political protests, is considered to be also acceptable for the parliamentary opposition. The Democrat Party did not field an opposing candidate. He was formally approved by the king on 3 August.

== Honours ==
- Thailand:
  - Knight Grand Cordon (Special Class) of the Most Exalted Order of the White Elephant
  - Knight Grand Cordon (Special Class) of the Most Noble Order of the Crown of Thailand
