= Arkhom Termpittayapaisith =

Thai civil servant and politician

- อาคม เติมพิทยาไพสิฐ
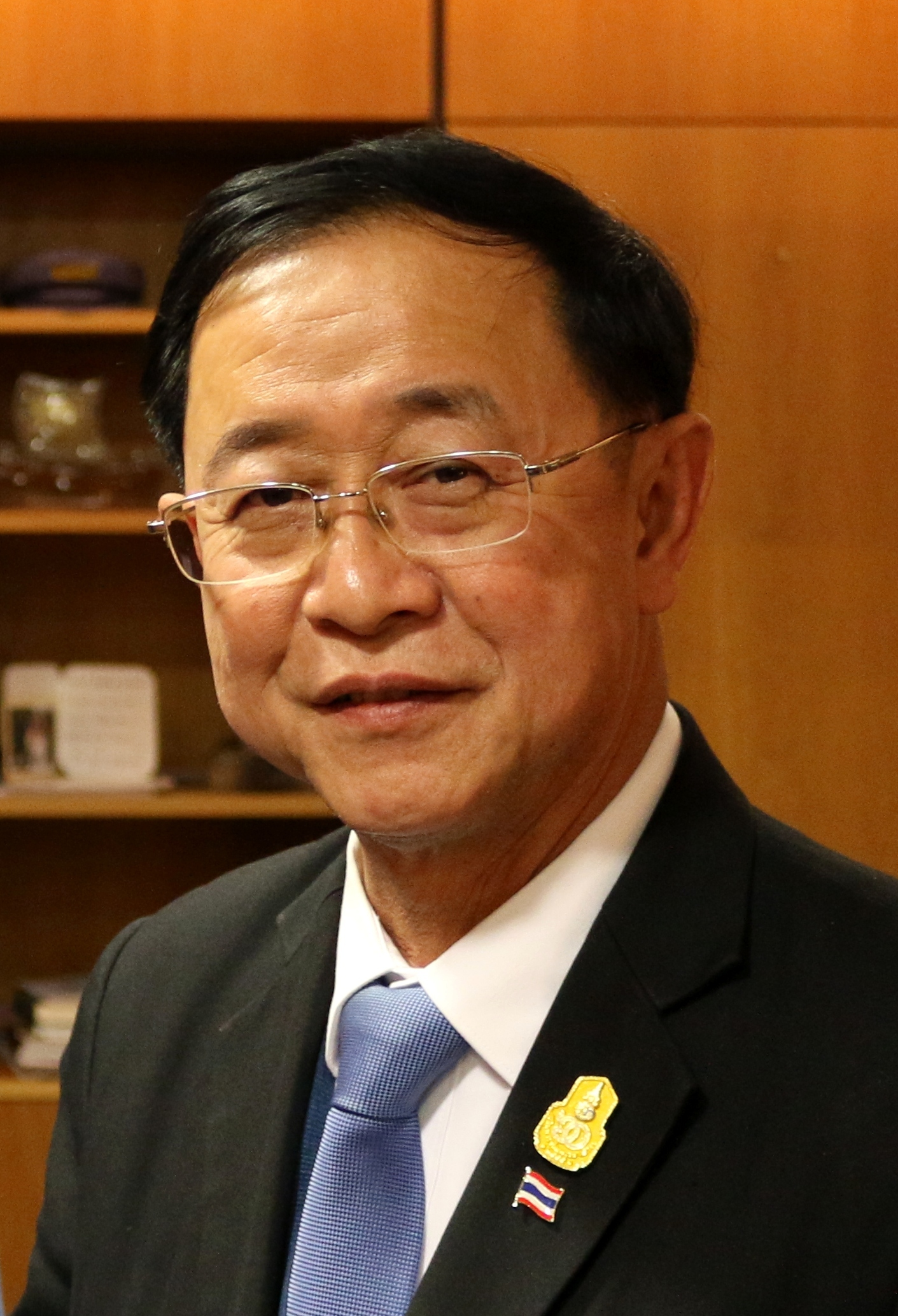
- Arkhom Termpittayapaisith in London (2017)

Minister of Finance
- In office 1 October 2020 – 1 September 2023
- Prime Minister: Prayut Chan-o-cha
- Preceded by: Predee Daochai
- Succeeded by: Srettha Thavisin

Minister of Transport
- In office 19 August 2015 – 10 July 2019
- Prime Minister: Prayut Chan-o-cha
- Preceded by: Prajin Juntong
- Succeeded by: Saksayam Chidchob

Deputy Minister of Transport
- In office 30 August 2014 – 19 August 2015
- Prime Minister: Prayut Chan-o-cha

Personal details
- Born: 25 September 1956 (age 70) Sisaket, Thailand
- Party: Independent
- Spouse: Mukda Termpittayapaisith
- Education: Thammasat University; Williams College
- Profession: Politician

Arkhom Termpittayapaisith (Thai: อาคม เติมพิทยาไพสิฐ, RTGS: Arkhom Toemphitthayaphaisit; born 25 July 1956) is a Thai civil servant and politician who served as Minister of Transport in the Cabinet of Thailand from 19 August 2015 to 10 July 2019. From 2020 to 2023, he was Thailand's Minister of Finance.

== Early life and education ==
Arkhom was born on 25 July 1956 at rural area in Sisaket Province. He graduated primary school from the Ruamsin Wittaya School and graduated secondary school from Sisaket Wittayalai School and Amnuay Silpa School. He studied undergraduate degree from the Faculty of Economics, Thammasat University in 1977, and a master's degree in economics from Williams College, USA in 1983.

== Careers ==
Arkhom served in service under the Office of the National Economic and Social Development Board. He served as Director of Economic Analysis and Projection Division from 1996 to 1999. He became a policy and planning expert in 1999–2000, then was appointed Assistant Secretary-General of Office of the National Economic and Social Development Council (2000-2003). Following that he was appointed Policy and Planning Advisor until 2004, when he was appointed Deputy Secretary-General of the Office of the National Economic and Social Development Board. In 2010 he was appointed Secretary-General of the Office of the National Economic and Social Development Board.

In 2014 he was appointed a member of the National Legislative Assembly. Later in August of the same year, He resigned from the NIA and took the position of Deputy Minister of Transport In the government of General Prayut Chan-o-cha. Later, in August 2015, he was appointed Minister of Transport.

In 2020 Arkhom was appointed Minister of Finance on October 5, 2020.

== Royal decorations ==
Arkhom has received the following royal decorations in the Honours System of Thailand:

- Knight Grand Cordon (Special Class) of The Most Noble Order of the Crown of Thailand
- Knight Grand Cordon (Special Class) of the Most Exalted Order of the White Elephant
- Chakrabarti Mala Medal

=== Foreign honours ===
- Japan :
  - Order of the Rising Sun, 2nd Class
