= 2026 Thai Senate election protests =

2026 political protest in Bangkok, Thailand

- Part of Thai political protests
- 2026 Thai Senate election protests the Bangkok Art and Culture Centre
- Date: 13 September 2026
- Location: In front of the Bangkok Art and Culture Centre (BACC), Pathum Wan District, Bangkok, Thailand
- Caused by: Allegations of vote rigging and coordinated block voting during the 2024 Thai Senate election.; Delays and demands urging the Election Commission of Thailand (ECT) to forward 229 accused individuals to the Supreme Court.
- Goals: Urge the ECT to issue a resolution indicting all 229 individuals involved in Senate election fraud without exception.; Accelerate constitutional reform and amendment processes toward a democratic system.
- Methods: Marching; Running; Cycling; Rallies; Public speaking
- Result: Pending the ECT's official rulings.: A formal complaint was filed with Pathum Wan Police Station to investigate the legality of the assembly.

Parties
Protesters: Internet Law Reform Dialogue (iLaw); Civil society networks and Senate candidates	State agencies & critics: Election Commission of Thailand (ECT); Sontiya Sawasdee (Complainant)

Casualties
- Arrested: None

The 2026 Thai Senate election protests were a series of political demonstrations held on 13 September 2026 by civic groups, led by the Internet Law Reform Dialogue (iLaw) and allied networks, in front of the Bangkok Art and Culture Centre (BACC) in Pathum Wan District, Bangkok. The primary objective of the protests was to pressure the Election Commission of Thailand (ECT) to indict 229 accused individuals to the Supreme Court over electoral fraud and coordinated block voting during the 2024 Thai Senate election.

== Background ==
Following the indirect 2024 Thai Senate election conducted under the 2017 Constitution, widespread public criticism and formal complaints emerged regarding organized block voting and coordinated groups intended to favor specific political factions. Throughout mid-2024, civil society organizations and various candidates compiled evidence and submitted it to the Election Commission for official investigation.

In September 2026, reports surfaced that the ECT was preparing to deliberate on whether to indict 229 individuals allegedly linked to election fraud under Section 226 of the 2017 Constitution and Section 62 of the Organic Act on the Acquisition of Senators (B.E. 2561). In response, iLaw and public networks organized marching, running, and cycling rallies converging on the Bangkok Art and Culture Centre to demonstrate public pressure on the independent agency.

== Rallies and activities ==
The demonstration commenced at approximately 16:00 on 13 September 2026 in front of the BACC. Activities featured public speeches delivered by civil society representatives and affected Senate candidates, highlighting the structural limitations of the 2017 Constitution and the oversight mechanisms governing corruption in Thailand.

Toward the conclusion of the rally, Mr. Yingcheep Atchanont, manager of iLaw, delivered a speech addressing the structural ties between the origins of the Election Commission and the Senate. He emphasized that the existing evidence was robust enough for the ECT to exercise its discretion—concluding that "there is reasonable ground to suspect electoral fraud"—and forward the cases to the Supreme Court as prescribed by law.

== Demands ==
The protesters presented two key demands to the Election Commission:

1. That a majority of the ECT commissioners vote to indict all 229 individuals implicated in the Senate election fraud without exception, upholding transparency standards for political officeholders.
2. That the government and relevant bodies accelerate constitutional reform and amendment processes to transition toward a fully democratic political system.

== Aftermath ==
Following the conclusion of the events, on 15 September 2026, political activist Sontiya Sawasdee filed a formal complaint with investigators at the Pathum Wan Police Station. He requested an official investigation into whether the organizers violated the Public Assembly Act of B.E. 2558 (2015), specifically naming key organizers and certain Members of Parliament from the People's Party who attended as observers.

== See also ==
- 2024 Thai Senate election
- Internet Law Reform Dialogue
- Elections in Thailand
