= National Legislative Assembly of Thailand =

National Legislative Assembly is the term used in Thailand for certain unelected parliaments. It may refer to:

- National Legislative Assembly of Thailand (2006)
- National Legislative Assembly of Thailand (2014)

== See also ==
- National Assembly of Thailand
