= Pornpetch Wichitcholchai =

President of the Senate of Thailand

Pornpetch Wichitcholchai MPCh MWM
- พรเพชร วิชิตชลชัย
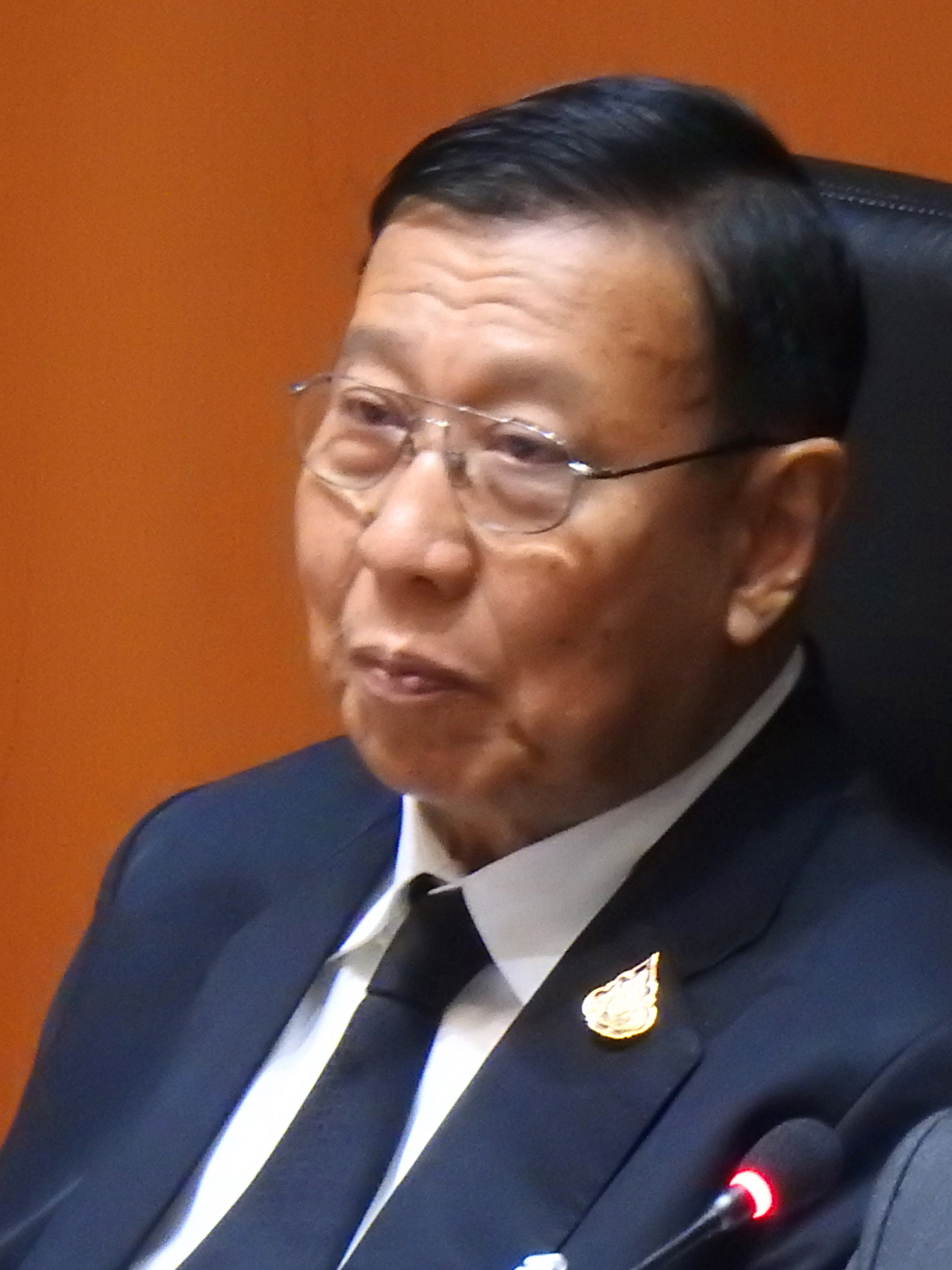
- Pornpetch in 2019

President of the Senate Vice President of National Assembly
- In office 28 May 2019 – 10 July 2024
- Monarch: Vajiralongkorn
- Prime Minister: Prayut Chan-o-cha; Srettha Thavisin
- Preceded by: Nikom Wairatpanij
- Succeeded by: Mongkol Surasajja

President of the National Legislative Assembly
- In office 17 August 2014 – 21 May 2019
- Monarchs: Bhumibol Adulyadej; Vajiralongkorn
- Prime Minister: Prayut Chan-o-cha
- Preceded by: Somsak Kiatsuranont (President of National Assembly)
- Succeeded by: Chuan Leekpai (President of National Assembly)

Personal details
- Born: 1 August 1948 (age 78) Bangkok, Thailand
- Party: Independent
- Spouse: Araya Wichitcholchai
- Education: Chulalongkorn University; Harvard University
- Profession: Lawyer

Pornpetch Wichitcholchai (Thai: พรเพชร วิชิตชลชัย, RTGS: Phonphet Wichitchonlachai; born 1 August 1948) is a Thai lawyer who has served as the President of the Senate of Thailand from May 2019 to July 2024. He was previously President of the National Legislative Assembly from August 2014 to May 2019.

== Education ==
Pornpetch attended high school at Vajiravudh College. He studied law at Chulalongkorn University, obtaining a bachelor's degree, and undertook postgraduate studies at the Harvard Law School, obtaining a master's degree.

== Career ==
He began work in government service for the first time in the legal position for Council of State. He previously served as a Supreme Court judge, chairman of the Court of Appeal Region 4, and Chief Justice of the Supreme Court. He was formerly a professor in the legal faculties of many universities. He also plays an important role in foreign countries as the Executive Director of the ASEAN Law Association since 1987, having been the Chairman of the National Law Committee of the ASEAN Law Association. While serving as President of the National Legislative Assembly, he was invited by the Inter-Parliamentary Union (IPU) to attend the World Conference of Speakers of Parliaments and gave a speech at the United Nations.

On 1 December 2016, Pornpetch, as the President of the National Legislative Assembly invited Crown Prince Vajiralongkorn to ascend to the throne as King after the death of Bhumibol Adulyadej.

On 24 May 2019, the military-appointed Senate convened for its first session, in which Pornpetch was elected Senate president unopposed.

== Honours ==
- Thailand:
  - Knight Grand Cordon (Special Class) of the Most Exalted Order of the White Elephant
