= Chai Chidchob =

Thai politician (1928–2020)

Chai Chidchob MPCh MWM
- ชัย ชิดชอบ
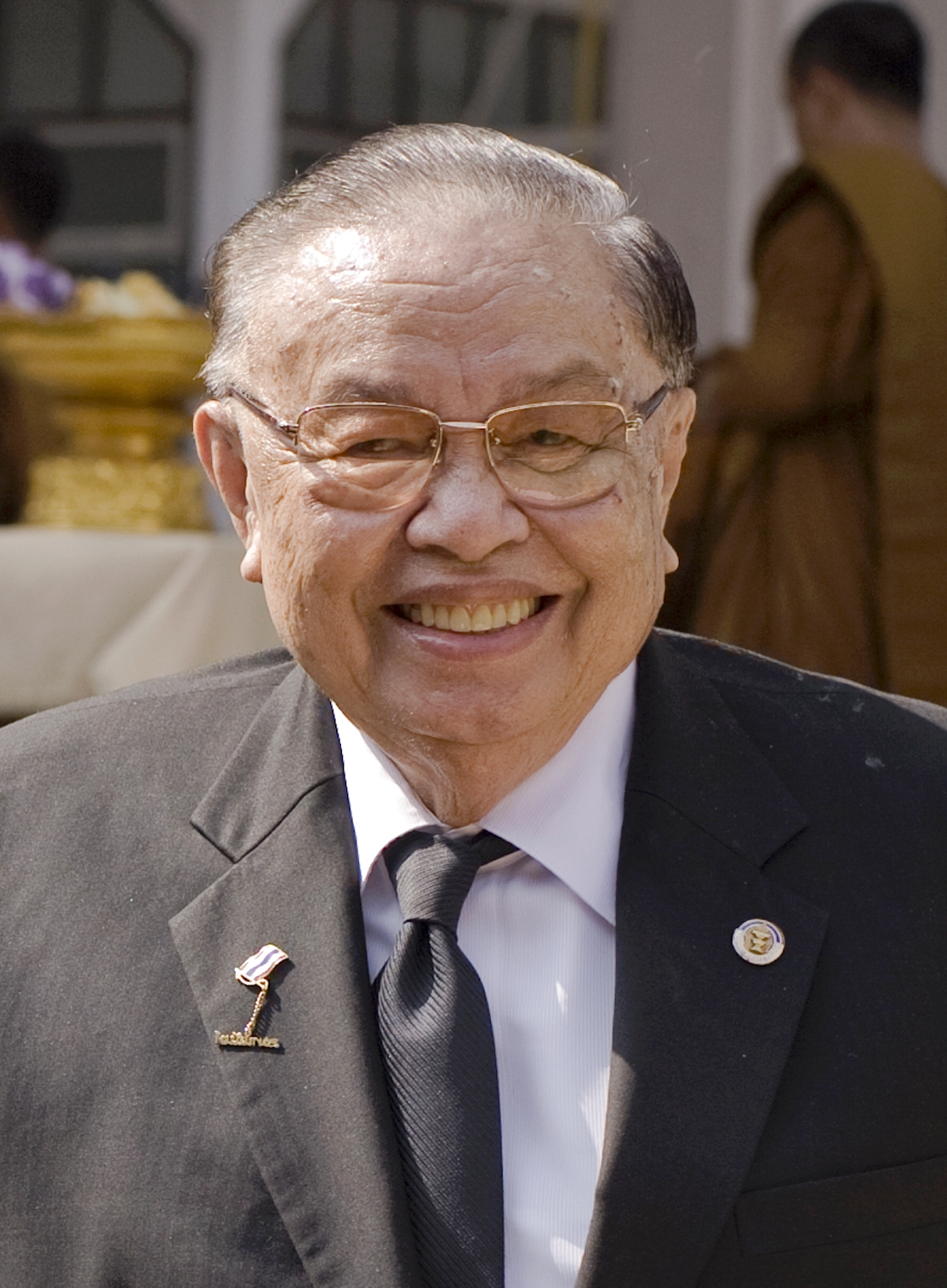
- Chai in 2011

Speaker of the House of Representatives and President of the National Assembly of Thailand
- In office 15 May 2008 – 10 May 2011
- Monarch: Bhumibol Adulyadej
- Prime Minister: Samak Sundaravej; Somchai Wongsawat; Abhisit Vejjajiva
- Preceded by: Yongyut Tiyapairach
- Succeeded by: Somsak Kiatsuranont

Personal details
- Born: 5 April 1928 Surin, Siam
- Died: 24 January 2020 (aged 91) Buriram, Thailand
- Party: Bhumjaithai Party
- Spouse: La-ong Chidchob
- Children: Newin Chidchob; Saksayam Chidchob; Permpoon Chidchob; Usanee Chidchob
- Education: Ramkhamhaeng University

Chai Chidchob (Thai: ชัย ชิดชอบ, RTGS: Chai Chitchop, IPA: [t͡ɕʰaj t͡ɕʰít.t͡ɕʰɔ̂ːp]; 5 April 1928 – 24 January 2020) was President of the National Assembly of Thailand and the Speaker of the House of Representatives from 15 May 2008 to 10 May 2011.

== Political career ==
He began his career in politics by being appointed as a kamnan in Buriram Province and became known to locals as "Kamnan Chai".

His national political career began in 1957. Chai contested a seat as a Democrat Party candidate in Surin, but failed to get elected. In 1969, he ran in Buriram as an independent candidate and managed to win. He was then reelected many times. In 2007 Chai was elected to the National Assembly of Thailand as a People's Power Party representative, however, he was previously affiliated with many political parties, including Justice Unity Party, Chart Thai Party, Solidarity Party and Thai Rak Thai.

== Personal life and education ==
He was married to La-ong. They had five sons and one daughter. One of Chai's sons is Newin Chidchob, a politician in the lower northeastern region. The PPP nomination of Chai as the house speaker is partly credited to Newin. He was an admirer of Israeli politician and soldier Moshe Dayan, sometimes even calling himself "Chai Moshe".

Chai graduated high school from Surawitthayakhan School in Surin Province. He was awarded a BA in political science by Ramkhamhaeng University and a bachelor's degree in agricultural extension and cooperative promotion from Sukhothai Thammathirat Open University.

== Death ==
Chai died at his house in Buriram on 24 January 2020.

== Royal decorations ==
Chai received the following royal decorations in the Honours System of Thailand:

- Knight Grand Cordon (Special Class) of The Most Noble Order of the Crown of Thailand
- Knight Grand Cordon (Special Class) of the Most Exalted Order of the White Elephant
- Commander (Third Class) of The Most Admirable Order of the Direkgunabhorn
