= Teeradej Meepien =

Thai general and politician

Teeradej Meepien MPCh MWM MP
- ธีรเดช มีเพียร

President of the Senate of Thailand
- In office 22 April 2011 – 25 July 2012
- Preceded by: Prasobsook Boondech
- Succeeded by: Nikom Wairatpanij

Personal details
- Born: 21 March 1938 (age 88) Bangkok, Thailand
- Party: Independent
- Spouse: Korrakot Meepien
- Education: Chulachomklao Royal Military Academy; Wayne State University
- Profession: Army officer

Teeradej Meepien (Thai: ธีรเดช มีเพียร, RTGS: Thiradet Miphian, pronounced [tʰīː.rā.dèːt mīː.pʰīan]; born 21 March 1940) is a Thai retired general and politician. From 2007 to 2010, he was the Chief Ombudsman of Thailand. From May 2011 to July 2012, he was the President of the Senate of Thailand who is ex officio also the Vice President of the National Assembly.

== Education ==
Teeradej graduated secondary from Saint Gabriel's College and then graduated from the Chulachomklao Royal Military Academy in 1962. In 1968, he took his master's degree in political science from the Wayne State University in Michigan. He has completed courses in army aviation at Fort Rucker, Alabama and at the United States Army Command and General Staff College at Fort Leavenworth, Kansas. Teeradej continued his military education at the Royal Thai Army War College and the National Defence College of Thailand.

== Military career ==
Teeradej served as a senator from 1979 to 1981. From 1989 to 1995, he held various executive positions in the Thai Armed Forces' Supreme Command Headquarters. From 1996 to 1997 he directed the 114 Coordinating Center of the Internal Security Operations Command (ISOC). Simultaneously, he was the Commanding General of the National Defence Studies Institute. In 1998, he was the Director of the War Veterans Organization of Thailand. From 1998 to 2000, he was the Permanent Secretary of the Ministry of Defence.

== Political career ==
From 2003 to 2007, Teeradej served as the Ombudsman of the National Assembly. From 2007 to 2010, he was the Chief Ombudsman, with the Office of the Ombudsmen now being a three-person constitutional organisation independent of the parliament, under the new constitution. In April 2011 Teeradej was appointed Senator. He was one of the senators selected by a committee and not elected by the people. Subsequently, he was elected President of the Senate who is ex officio also the Vice President of the National Assembly. He took office on 9 May 2011.

He lost his office on 25 July 2012, when a court convicted him for malfeasance during his tenure as chief ombudsman. According to the verdict, Teeradej had wrongfully awarded himself and his fellow ombudsmen monthly meeting allowances. He was given a suspended jail sentence of two years. As a convicted lawbreaker, he automatically lost his office in accordance with the constitution. His deputy speaker Nikom Wairatpanij was elected his successor.
