= Meechai Ruchuphan =

Thai legal expert and politician

- มีชัย ฤชุพันธุ์
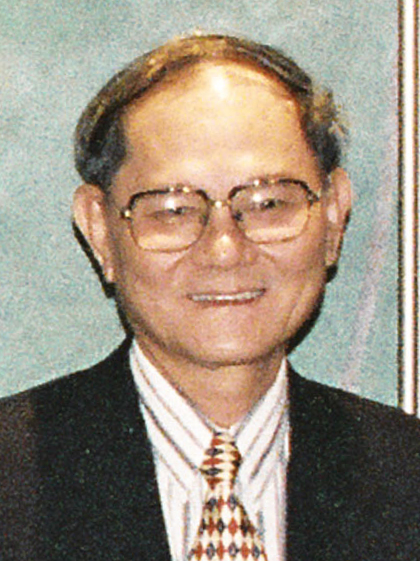
- Meechai in 1998

President of the National Legislative Assembly
- In office 25 October 2006 – 28 January 2008
- Preceded by: Bhokin Bhalakula (House of Representatives)
- Succeeded by: Yongyuth Tiyapairat (House of Representatives)

President of the National Assembly of Thailand
- In office 28 June 1992 – 29 June 1992
- Preceded by: Ukrit Mongkolnavin (Senate)
- Succeeded by: Marut Bunnag (House of Representatives)

President of the Senate of Thailand
- In office 28 June 1992 – 21 March 2000
- Preceded by: Ukrit Mongkolnavin
- Succeeded by: Sanit Worapanya

Acting Prime Minister of Thailand
- In office 24 May 1992 – 10 June 1992
- Monarch: Bhumibol Adulyadej
- Preceded by: Suchinda Kraprayoon
- Succeeded by: Anand Panyarachun

Deputy Prime Minister of Thailand
- In office 2 March 1991 – 22 March 1992
- Prime Minister: Anand Panyarachun
- In office 14 April 1992 – 9 June 1992
- Prime Minister: Suchinda Kraprayoon; Himself (acting)

Minister to the Office of the Prime Minister
- In office 21 March 1980 – 3 August 1988
- Prime Minister: Prem Tinsulanonda
- In office 9 August 1988 – 4 January 1990
- Prime Minister: Chatichai Choonhavan

Personal details
- Born: 2 February 1938 (age 88) Bangkok, Siam (now Bangkok, Thailand)
- Spouse: Amphorn Ruchuphan
- Occupation: Legal expert; civil servant; politician

Meechai Ruchuphan (Thai: มีชัย ฤชุพันธุ์, RTGS: Michai Ruechuphan, IPA: [miː.t͡ɕʰaj rɯ́.t͡ɕʰú.pʰan]; born 2 February 1938) is a Thai legal expert and politician who served as acting Prime Minister of Thailand in 1992.

== Life and career ==
=== Education and civil service career ===
Meechai has completed a bachelor's degree in law from Thammasat University and a master's degree in comparative law from Southern Methodist University, Texas. He participated in the Texas Legislative Internship Program.

After his return to Thailand, he became a civil servant at the Office of the Council of State, rising to become head of the law drafting division. He was appointed legal advisor of prime minister Sanya Dharmasakti in 1973 and permanently assigned to the Office of the Prime Minister. During the military rule he was appointed a member of the Nationale Legislative Assembly in 1977 and in the same year deputy secretary-general of the prime minister.

=== Cabinet minister and acting prime minister ===
In March 1980, he was appointed minister to the Office of the Prime Minister in the cabinet of General Prem Tinsulanonda. He held that position during all of Prem's eight-year rule and even after the change of government under Prime Minister Chatichai Choonhavan until 1990. Concurrently, he served as Senator from 1983 to 1989. In April 1991 he was appointed Deputy Prime Minister, serving under Anand Panyarachun and then under his successor General Suchinda Kraprayoon. Meechai also was president of the 1991 Constitution drafting committee.

After Suchinda's resignation under public pressure in the course of the events of Black May on 24 May 1992, Meechai acted as caretaker prime minister until a new head of government (Anand Panyarachun for a second term) was appointed on 10 June.

=== Senate speaker ===
Afterwards Meechai served as Senator again and was the Speaker of the Senate from 1992 to 2000. In this position he presided over a constitutional tribunal which ruled as legal an executive decree of the Suchinda administration (reportedly drafted by Meechai himself) that amnestied those responsible for the shooting of protesters. Meechai was critical of the 1997 draft constitution that had been elaborated in a long process under intensive participation of the civil society. He deemed some of the provisions too progressive, e.g. the article that declared all discrimination on grounds of social origin illegal. This was in Meechai's view incompatible with Thai culture that held it normal to crawl on knees in front of the king and unthinkable to confront him upright and akimbo. However, he finally supported the passage of the constitution in order to avoid political chaos giving the Asian financial and economic crisis and the hope that many had set on this draft.

=== NLA president, junta member and constitution drafter ===
Meechai served as President of the military-appointed National Legislative Assembly of Thailand (NLA) after the coup d'état in 2006. His appointment was seen as a sign for a move towards a more conservative, law-and-order constitution. He retrospectively judged the 1997 constitution as unsuitable for Thailand, comparing it to a Rolls-Royce with which one cannot plough a paddy field. He claimed that the Thai monarchy was endangered by three different groups: one group was questioning the necessity of monarchy through articles and research; one was anonymously attacking members of the royal family by criticising their behaviour and posting unsuitable images on websites hosted abroad; the third would abuse the monarchy for self-interest and political causes. Therefore, the rigorous lèse-majesté law had to stay in place and be strictly enforced. Meechai was also an advocate of appointed, instead of democratically elected, Prime Minister and National Assembly.

As of 2011, Meechai was the chairman of Thailand's Law Reform Commission at the Council of State. After another coup d'état in 2014, Meechai—as one of two civilians—was appointed as a member of the junta which calls itself the National Council for Peace and Order (NCPO). After a first military-appointed committee's draft constitution failed, Meechai was appointed chairman of another Constitution drafting committee by the NCPO on 5 October 2015.

== Family and social status ==
Meechai was married to Khunying Amphorn Ruchuphan (née Seneewongse na Ayutthaya). They had two daughters.

The academic David Streckfuss names Meechai as an example of "Those in the Shade of Charisma", referring to a group of (appointed) politicians, important business and upper-class figures who are in favour with the palace.

Preceded by General Suchinda Kraprayoon	acting Prime Minister of Thailand; 1992	Succeeded by Anand Panyarachun
