= Hun Saroeun =

Cambodian diplomat

- ហ៊ុន សារឿន

7th Ambassador of Cambodia to Thailand
- Incumbent
- Assumed office February 2023
- Monarch: Norodom Sihamoni
- Prime Minister: Hun Sen; Hun Manet
- Preceded by: Ouk Sorphorn

Hun Saroeun (Khmer: ហ៊ុន សារឿន) is a Cambodian diplomat, currently serving as 7th Ambassador of Cambodia to Thailand since February 2023. He is the grandson of Senate President and former Prime Minister Hun Sen.

== Career ==
=== Phone call leak ===
On 19 June 2025, Hun was summoned by Piyapak Sricharoen, Director-General of the Department of East Asian Affairs of the Thai Foreign Ministry to receive a letter of protest regarding the 18 June 2025 leak of a phone call between Thai Prime Minister Paetongtarn Shinawatra and Hun Sen.
