= List of presidents of the Senate of Thailand =

Presidents of the Senate of Thailand ประธานวุฒิสภา
- Seal of the National Assembly of Thailand

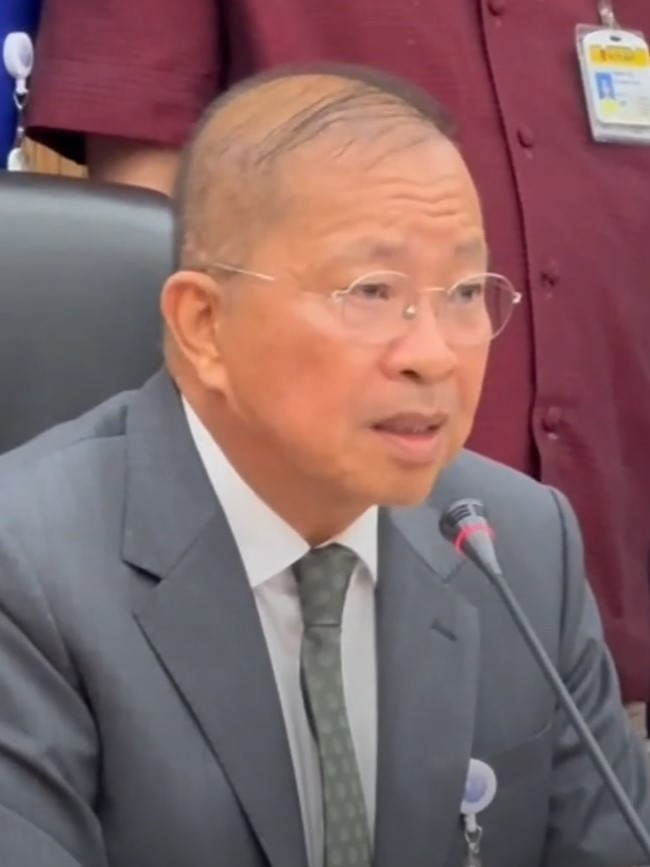
- Incumbent; Mongkol Surasajja since 26 July 2024
- Senate of Thailand; Office of the President of the Senate
- Style: Mr. Speaker or Mr. President (informal); The Honourable (formal)
- Status: Presiding officer
- Member of: National Assembly; Senate of Thailand
- Seat: Sappaya-Sapasathan
- Nominator: Vote within the Senate of Thailand
- Appointer: The Monarch
- Term length: According to the term of the Senate
- Constituting instrument: Constitution of Thailand
- Inaugural holder: Vilas Osathanon
- Formation: 4 June 1946; 80 years ago
- Salary: ฿74,420 monthly

The president of the Senate of Thailand is the presiding officer of the upper chamber of the National Assembly of Thailand.

== List of presidents of the Senate ==
No.	Portrait	Name (Birth–Death)	Term of office		Party
No.	Portrait	Name (Birth–Death)	Took office	Left office	Party
1		Vilas Osathanon วิลาศ โอสถานนท์ (1899–1997)	4 June 1946	24 August 1946	Khana Ratsadon
2		Phraya Sorayuthaseni พระยาศรยุทธเสนี (1888–1962)	31 August 1946	9 November 1947	Constitutional Front
3		Chaophraya Sri Thammathibet เจ้าพระยาศรีธรรมาธิเบศ (1885–1976)	26 November 1947	29 November 1951	Independent
4		Nai Vorkarnbancha นายวรการบัญชา (1903–1974)	22 July 1968	17 November 1971	Independent
5		Chitti Tingsabadh จิตติ ติงศภัทิย์ (1908–1995)	7 February 1975	6 October 1976	Independent
6		Harin Hongsakul หะริน หงสกุล (1914–2008)	9 May 1979	25 April 1983	Independent
7		Charubud Ruengsuwan จารุบุตร เรืองสุวรรณ (1920–1984)	26 April 1983	19 March 1984	Independent
8		Ukrit Mongkolnavin อุกฤษ มงคลนาวิน (born 1933)	30 April 1984	21 April 1989	Independent
9		Wan Chansue วรรณ ชันซื่อ (1923–2015)	4 May 1989	23 February 1991	Independent
(8)		Ukrit Mongkolnavin อุกฤษ มงคลนาวิน (born 1933)	3 April 1992	25 May 1992	Independent
10		Meechai Ruchuphan มีชัย ฤชุพันธุ์ (born 1938)	28 June 1992	21 March 2000	Independent
11		Sanit Vorapanya สนิท วรปัญญา (born 1939)	4 August 2000	12 March 2001	Independent
12		Manoonkrit Roopkachorn มนูญกฤต รูปขจร (born 1935)	8 April 2001	4 January 2004	Independent
13		Suchon Chaleekure สุชน ชาลีเครือ (born 1952)	5 March 2004	19 September 2006	Independent
14		Prasopsuk Bundech ประสพสุข บุญเดช (born 1945)	14 March 2008	12 April 2011	Independent
15		Teeradej Meepien ธีรเดช มีเพียร (born 1940)	4 May 2011	25 July 2012	Independent
16		Nikom Wairatpanij นิคม ไวยรัชพานิช (born 1947)	23 August 2012	8 May 2014	Independent
—		Surachai Leangboonleodchai สุรชัย เลี้ยงบุญเลิศชัย (born 1953); Acting	21 March 2014	24 May 2014	Independent
17		Pornpetch Wichitcholchai พรเพชร วิชิตชลชัย (born 1948)	28 May 2019	10 July 2024	Independent
18		Mongkol Surasajja มงคล สุระสัจจะ (born 1952)	26 July 2024	Incumbent	Independent

== Sources ==
- Various editions of The Europa World Year Book
