= Mongkol Surasajja =

Thai politician

Mongkol Surasajja MPCh MVM
- มงคล สุระสัจจะ
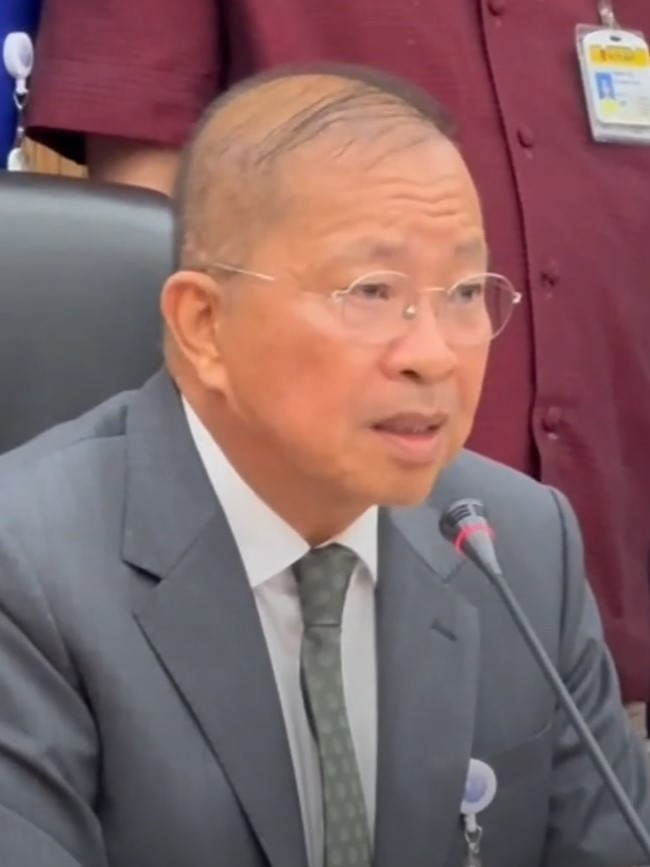
- Surasajja in 2025

President of the Senate Vice President of National Assembly
- Incumbent
- Assumed office 26 July 2024
- Monarch: Vajiralongkorn
- Prime Minister: Srettha Thavisin; Phumtham Wechayachai (acting); Paetongtarn Shinawatra; Suriya Juangroongruangkit (acting); Anutin Charnvirakul
- Preceded by: Pornpetch Wichitcholchai

Member of the Senate
- Incumbent
- Assumed office 10 July 2024

Personal details
- Born: 9 August 1952 (age 74) Saraburi, Thailand
- Education: Ramkhamhaeng University

Mongkol Surasajja (Thai: มงคล สุระสัจจะ) (born 9 August 1952) is a Thai politician and President of the Senate of Thailand.

== Career ==
He serves as a Member of the Senate of Thailand from Buriram province. Surasajja previously served as the Governor of Buriram province and director-general of the Department of Provincial Administration. Surasajja is viewed as closely associated with the Bhumjaithai Party. He was elected President of the Senate of Thailand at the first session of the Senate on July 23, 2024, following the 2024 Thai Senate election.

Surasajja was an activist during the 1973 Thai popular uprising.

== Royal decorations ==
- 2025 – Knight Grand Cross of the Most Exalted Order of the White Elephant
- 2010 – Knight Grand Cordon of the Most Noble Order of the Crown of Thailand
- 1982 – Freemen Safeguarding Medal (Second Class, Second Category)
- 1984 – Border Service Medal
- 2004 – Chakra Mala Medal
- 2009 – Boy Scout Citation Medal of Vajira, First Class
- 2008 – First Class (Gold Medal) of the Red Cross Medal of Appreciation
