= 2024 Thai Senate election =

- 9–26 June 2024
- All 200 seats in the Senate
Party	Seats	+/–
Independents	200	+150
This lists parties that won seats. See the complete results below.

Senate elections were held in Thailand from 9 to 26 June 2024, the first of its kind under the 2017 Constitution. Under the Constitution, the transitional Senate of Thailand expired on 10 May 2024. Afterwards, with this election, the Senate became a 200-member body and have no power to elect Prime Ministers.

This was the first election to utilize the highly complex electoral system envisioned by the 2018 Organic Act on the Acquisition of Senators. Its members will be elected among the independent candidates, without participation from outside the candidate pool. The elections were already criticized for the complexity, secrecy and confusion of the voting system.

== Background ==
The Thai Senate has undergone several reformations since it was originally established in 1947. On various occasions, the Senate has been appointed, directly elected, indirectly elected, or some combination of these. Under the present 2017 Constitution, which was promulgated in the aftermath of the 2014 Thai coup d'état, provided for a 5-year transitional Senate appointed by the National Council for Peace and Order, the military junta that governed Thailand from the coup in 2014 until 2019, followed by "permanent" Senates.

The transitional Senate is composed of 250 members handpicked by the junta. It had the power to vote for Prime Minister, alongside members of the House of Representatives. It voted overwhelmingly for Prayut Chan-o-cha in 2019 and Srettha Thavisin in 2023. This provision came under intense public scrutiny during the 2023 Prime Ministerial election, when Senators refused to back the election of Pita Limjaroenrat, despite a large majority of the House supporting his candidacy.

After the transitional Senate expires on 10 May 2024, the following Senates are indirectly elected via a highly complex election system, intended to produce a technocratic institution. The 2024 elections will be the first to use this system. The permanent Senate will not have the power to vote for Prime Minister.

=== 2023 elections ===
The government of Prayut Chan-o-cha was defeated in a landslide in the 2023 House of Representatives elections. The Move Forward Party won the most seats, with Pheu Thai Party in second place. An attempt to form a coalition government between the two parties failed, after Move Forward leader Pita Limjaroenrat failed to be elected prime minister, largely because of opposition from the conservative Senate.

Instead, the government was formed by Pheu Thai's Srettha Thavisin. The Srettha Cabinet is supported by the conservative Bhumjaithai Party and Chart Thai Pattana Party, as well as Prayut-aligned parties such as Palang Pracharath Party and United Thai Nation Party.

== Electoral system ==
The permanent Senate of Thailand is composed of 200 senators, chosen by and among "persons having the knowledge, expertise, experience, profession, or characteristics or common interests or working or having worked in varied areas of the society". It is a non-partisan body, and all candidates will run as independents. Senators serve five-year terms and are ineligible for re-election thereafter. The rules for the election are laid down in the 2018 Organic Act on the Acquisition of Senators.

Candidates must be Thai nationals by birth, at least 40 years old, and have a minimum of 10 years experience in their field. The 20 groups include:

1. Public administration and national security group
2. Law and justice group
3. Education group
4. Public health group
5. Rice or emblements farmer group
6. Orchardists, persons who work in forests, ranch, and fishing group
7. Employees excluding governmental employees group
8. Persons who work in the environmental, city planning, real estate and utilities, natural resource, and energy field group
9. SME entrepreneurs and other group
10. Entrepreneurs other than (9) group
11. Persons who work in the tourism field group
12. Industrialists and similar group
13. Persons who work in the scientific, technological, communications, innovative, or similar field group
14. Women group
15. Elderly, disabled, ethnic minority and other identity groups
16. Arts, culture, music, performance and entertainment group
17. NGOs group
18. Persons in sports, mass media and literature group
19. Freelancer group
20. Other group

They must have some connection to the district they seek to contest in. They must also pay a 2,500 baht application fee. Candidates cannot be members of a political party. Also prohibited from contesting are civil servants, current and former member of parliaments, former government ministers, former local administrators, former political party executives (unless they have been out of their post for at least five years), parents, spouses and children of senatorial candidates. Members of the transitional Senate cannot run.

Senators are elected among applicant candidates pool, without any participation from non-candidates. Each candidate applies to represent one of 20 eligible groups, and ten senators will be elected from each group. There are six rounds of voting, two each at the district, provincial, and national level. Notably, the public cannot observe the voting process, except the candidates themselves.

=== Timeline ===
At the district level, the candidates will vote within their group. In each district, the five candidates in each group with the most votes will advance to the second round. In the second round, each candidate will be assigned 3–5 random groups (other than their own), and vote for the candidates in those groups. The top three candidates in each group in each district will then advance, for a total of 60 candidates in each district.

The provincial level process will occur on 16 June. Because the number of districts in each province varies (anywhere between three and 50), the number of candidates in each province will vary significantly. Candidates will first narrow the number of candidates in their group to 5. They will then again vote for candidates in other groups. They may or may not be assigned the same groups to vote in at the provincial level than at the district level. There will now be 2 candidates in each group in each province, for a total of 3,080 remaining candidates nationwide.

The process will then move on to the national level, where the remaining 3,080 candidates will repeat the intra and inter-group voting to elect 10 senators from each of the 20 groups.

The number of candidates each voter is allowed to vote for varies depending on the round. The system lends itself to limited voting. At the district and provincial level, each voter will have two votes within their group, and one vote for the inter-group election. At the national level, a voter may have ten votes for the intra-group election, and five for the inter-group election. The candidates with the most votes will proceed, and all others will be eliminated. There is no minimum threshold of votes required to be elected. Candidates may vote for themselves in the intra-group elections. A voter may not cast more than one vote for a single candidate. A voter does not need to use all of their votes.

Summary of election process
Round	Date	Level	Candidates progressing			Election rules
Round	Date	Level	In group	All groups	Across Thailand	Election rules
1	9 June	In each of the 928 districts	5	100	92,800	Limited voting (2 votes)
2	9 June	In each of the 928 districts	3	60	55,680	Single non-transferable vote (SNTV)
3	16 June	In each of the 77 provinces	5	100	7,700	Limited voting (2 votes)
4	16 June	In each of the 77 provinces	2	40	3,080	Single non-transferable vote (SNTV)
5	26 June	Across Thailand	40	800		Limited voting (10 votes)
6	26 June	Across Thailand	10	200		Limited voting (5 votes)

== Criticism ==
The electoral system is controversial. Critics have referred to it as "the most complicated election in the world".

Other criticism centers on the system's alleged vulnerability to manipulation. Because any eligible person can run, district-level elections can be packed in order to ensure the election of particular candidates. The 2018 election for the transitional Senate utilized a similar system, although most senators were ultimately selected by the junta. Candidates who participated in the process alleged vote buying, saying that desired candidates utilized their professional connections to be elected.

== Results ==
The Election Commission published the list of elected senators in the Royal Gazette and subsequently inaugurated them on 10 July.

Party	District level		Provincial level		National level		Seats
Party	Votes	%	Votes	%	Votes	%	Seats
Independents							200
Total							200
Total votes	43,818	–	23,064	–	2,986	–	
Registered votes/turnont	46,206 (Note: Originally there were 48,117 Candidates for the District level.)		23,645		2,994 (Note: Originally there were 3,000 Candidates for the National level.)		
Source: ECT

=== Senator count by province ===
Province (64 of 77 provinces)	Seat(s) composition	Seat(s) total
Buriram	14	14
Bangkok	9	9
Ayutthaya, Surin	7	14
Songkhla, Satun, Ang Thong	6	18
Amnat Charoen, Si Sa Ket, Uthai Thani, Loei, Nakhon Si Thammarat	5	25
Surat Thani, Phetchaburi, Samut Sakhon, Krabi, Samut Songkhram	4	20
Singburi, Pichit, Nakhon Phanom, Yala, Suphanburi, Phang Nga, Prachinburi, Trat, Nonthaburi, Ratchaburi, Chaiyaphum, Kanchanaburi, Chachoengsao, Nakhon Nayok	3	42
Chainat, Nakhon Sawan, Pattani, Sukhothai, Rayong, Khon Kaen, Lamphun, Prachuap Khiri Khan, Bueng Kan, Ranong, Chonburi, Phuket, Chiang Rai, Nong Bua Lamphu, Samut Prakan, Mukdahan, Pathum Thani, Chanthaburi, Chiang Mai, Phatthalung, Nan, Ubon Ratchathani, Yasothon, Nakhon Ratchasima, Nakhon Pathom	2	50
Phrae, Saraburi, Trang, Chumphon, Phitsanuloke, Lampang, Nong Khai, Phayao	1	8
—N/a		200

=== Voting camps ===
Voting camps of the 2024 Thai Senate: Blue Senators (153) New Breed Senators (19) Unafilliated/Unknown (28)

On 23 July 2024, the newly elected Senators gathered to elect the President. The results were 153 for the so-called "Blue Senators," who were alleged to be affiliated with Bhumjaithai Party, 19 for the so-called "New Breed Senators" who vowed to promote liberal and progressive causes (despite 30 pledged into this camp beforehand), and 13 for the unaffiliated of the two aforementioned camps. This included invalid and blank votes.

== Money laundering and vote-rigging scandal ==
In 2025, Thailand's Election Commission (EC) and the Department of Special Investigation (DSI) launched probes into senators amidst allegations of vote-rigging and money laundering during the 2024 election.
