= History of Thailand (1973–2001) =

Late 20th-century Thailand
- 14 October 1973 – 6 January 2001
Early 20th century	21st century
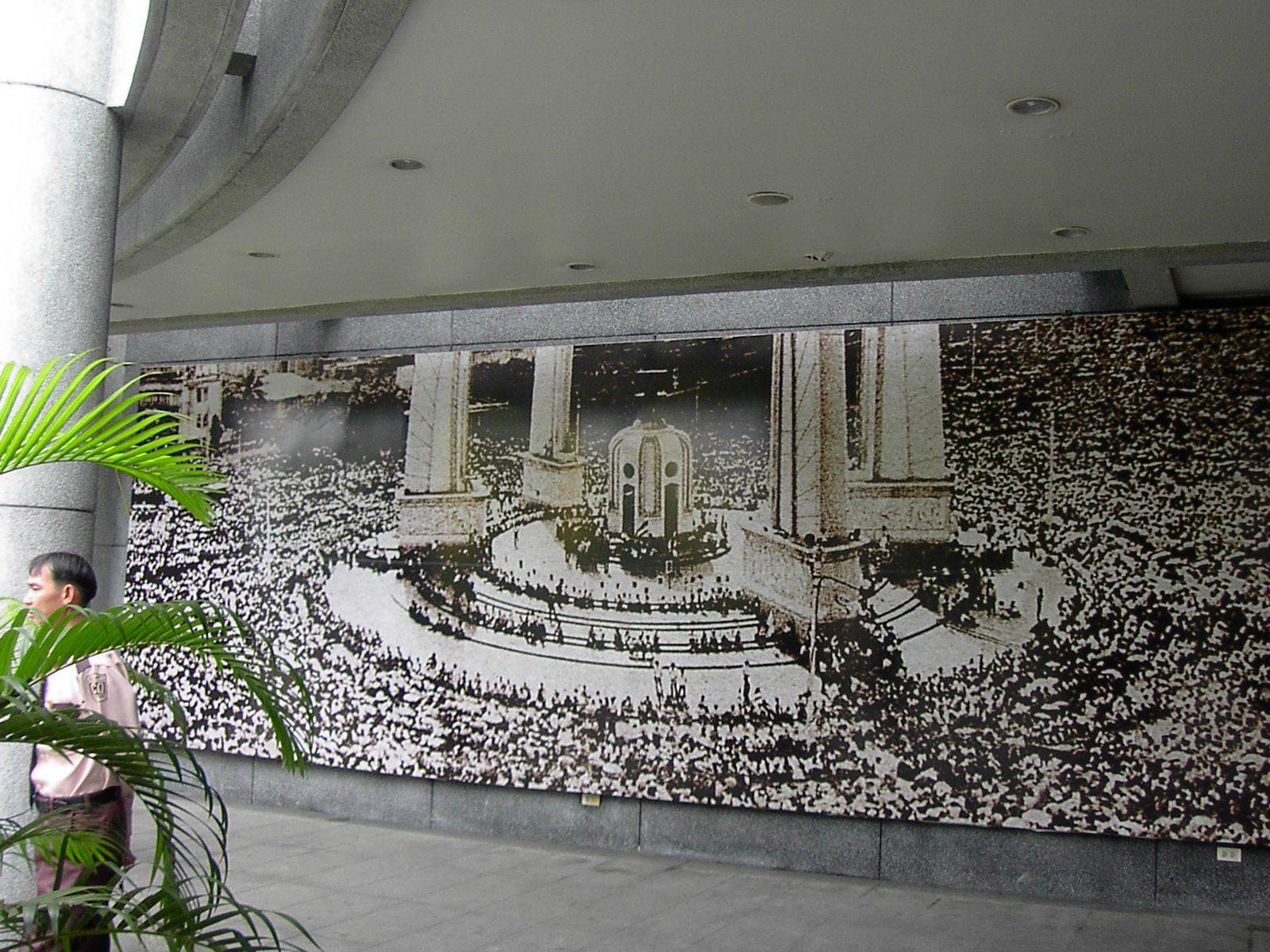
- Crowds rallying at the Democracy Monument during the 14 October 1973 uprising
- Monarch: Bhumibol Adulyadej (Rama IX)
- Leaders: Sanya Dharmasakti; Seni Pramoj; Kukrit Pramoj; Thanin Kraivichien; Kriangsak Chamanan; Prem Tinsulanonda; Chatichai Choonhavan; Anand Panyarachun; Suchinda Kraprayoon; Chuan Leekpai; Banharn Silpa-archa; Chavalit Yongchaiyudh
- Key events: 14 October uprising; October 1976 massacre; October 1976 coup; March 1977 coup attempt; October 1977 coup; Vietnamese border raids; 1981 coup attempt; 1985 coup attempt; 1991 coup; National Peace Keeping Council; Black May; 1997 financial crisis

The history of Thailand from 1973 to 2001 saw an unstable period of democracy, with military rule being reimposed after a bloody coup in 1976, after the previous military rulers had been removed as a result of the revolution of 14 October 1973.

For most of the 1980s, Thailand was ruled by Prime Minister Prem Tinsulanonda, a democratically-inclined strongman who restored parliamentary politics. Thereafter, the country remained a democracy, apart from a brief period of military rule from 1991 to 1992.

Between 1985 and 1994, Thailand was the world's fastest growing economy according to the World Bank. Foreign investment primarily from Japan turned Thailand into a manufacturing hub in Southeast Asia by the end of the century.

The 1997 Asian financial crisis culminated in populist Thaksin Shinawatra's victory in the 2001 Thai general election.

== Popular uprising (1973–1976) ==
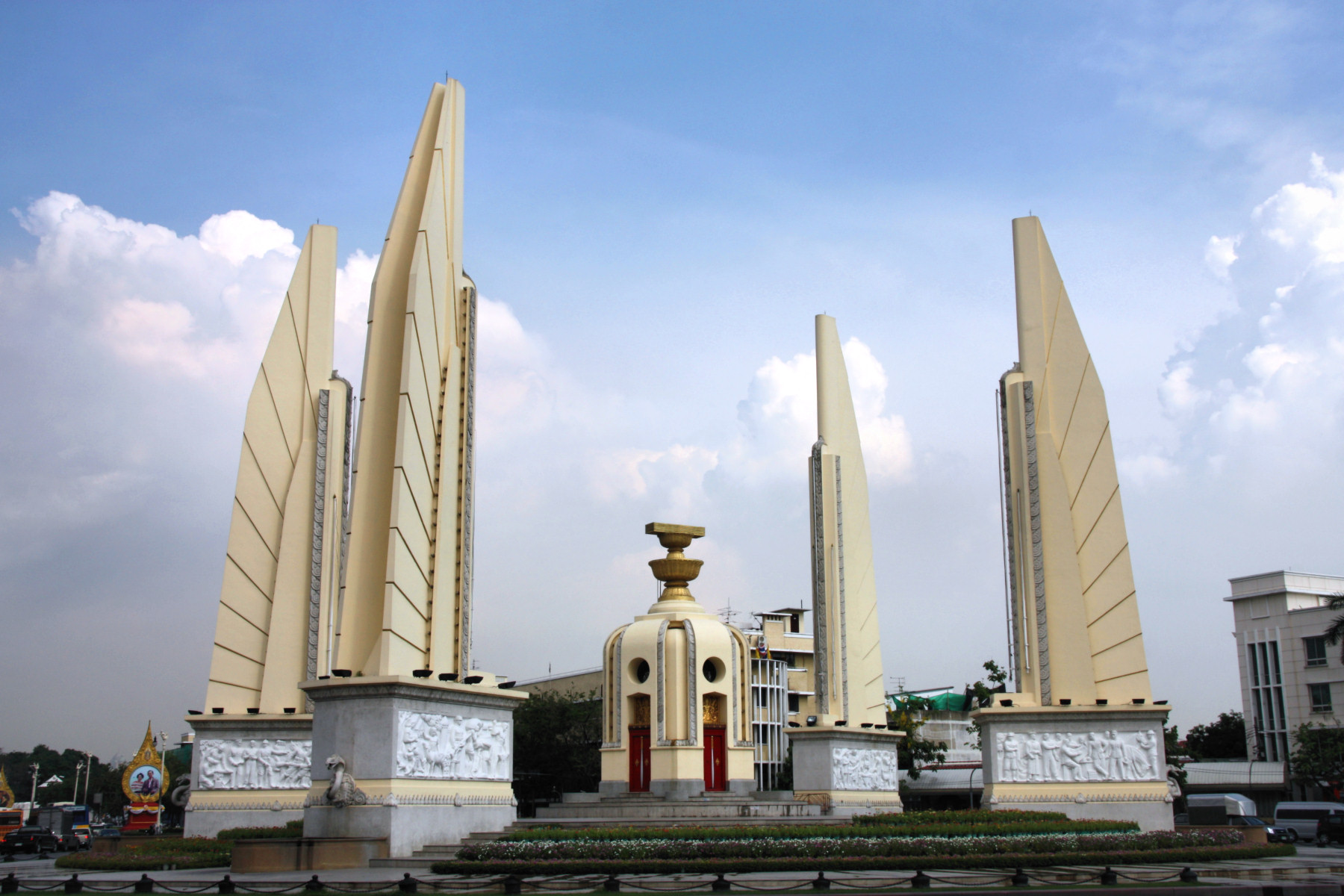
The Democracy Monument in Bangkok, built in 1940 to commemorate the end of the absolute monarchy in 1932, was the scene of massive demonstrations in 1973, 1976, 1992 and 2010.

The events of October 1973 amounted to a revolution in Thai politics. For the first time, the urban middle class, led by the students, had challenged the ruling junta, and had gained the apparent blessing of King Bhumibol Adulyadej for a transition to democracy. The leaders of the junta were forced to step down; they then took refuge in the United States or Taiwan.

Thailand, however, had not yet produced a political class able to make this bold new democracy function smoothly. The January 1975 elections failed to produce a stable party majority, and fresh elections in April 1976 produced the same result. The veteran politician Seni Pramoj and his brother Kukrit Pramoj alternated in power, but were unable to carry out a coherent reform program. The sharp increase in oil prices in 1974 led to recession and inflation, weakening the government's position. The communist insurgency led by the Thai communist party gradually became more active in the countryside, allying with urban intellectuals and students.

South Vietnam, Laos, and Cambodia fell to communist forces in 1975. The threat of the communists in the neighboring countries soon led to panic among the people. The arrival of communist regimes on Thailand's borders, the abolition of the 600-year-old Lao monarchy, and the arrival of a flood of refugees from Laos and Cambodia swung public opinion in Thailand to the right, and conservatives did much better in the 1976 elections than they had done in 1975.

== Return to military rule (1976–1980) ==
By late 1976, moderate middle class opinion had turned away from the activism of the students, who had moved increasingly to the left. The army and the right-wing parties began a propaganda war against student liberalism by accusing student activists of being 'communists' and through formal paramilitary organizations such the Nawaphon, the Village Scouts, and the Red Gaurs, many of those students were killed. Matters came to a head in October when Thanom Kittikachorn returned to Thailand to enter a royal monastery, Wat Bovorn.

Tension between workers and factory owners became fierce, as the civil rights movement became more active after 1973. Socialism and leftist ideology gained popularity among intellectuals and the working class. The political atmosphere became even more tense. Workers were found hung in Nakhon Pathom after protesting against a factory owner. A Thai version of anti-communist McCarthyism spread widely. Whoever staged a protest could be accused of being part of a communist conspiracy.

In 1976, students protesters occupied the Thammasat University campus and held protests over the violent deaths of the workers and staged a mock hanging of the victims, one of whom allegedly bore a resemblance to Crown Prince Vajiralongkorn. Some newspapers the following day, including the Bangkok Post, published an altered version of a photo of the event, which suggested the protestors had committed lèse majesté. Rightist and ultra-conservative icons such as Samak Sundaravej blasted the protestors, instigating violent means to suppress them, culminating in the 6 October 1976 massacre. The army unleashed the paramilitaries and mob violence followed, in which many were killed.

The same evening, the junta staged a coup, declaring the end of the Democrat Party led-coalition government. The army installed Thanin Kraivichien, an ultra-conservative former judge, as prime minister, and carried out a sweeping purge of the universities, the media and the civil service. Thousands of students, intellectuals and other leftists fled Bangkok and took refuge with the Communist Party's insurgent forces in the north and north-east, operating from safe bases in Laos. Others left for exile, including Dr. Puey Ungphakorn, a respected economist and Rector of Thammasat University. The economy was also in serious difficulties, in no small part due to Thanin's policies, which frightened foreign investors.

The new regime proved as unstable as the democratic experiment had been. In March 1977, one army faction staged a coup d'état attempt but failed. In October 1977 a different section of the army staged another "coup" and replaced Thanin with General Kriangsak Chamanan. In 1978 the government offered an amnesty to Thai communists willing to "work with us to build a prosperous nation". The offer included housing, family reunion and security.

By this time, Thai forces had to deal with the situation resulting from the Vietnamese invasion of Cambodia. There was another flood of refugees, and both Vietnamese and Khmer Rouge forces periodically crossed into Thai territory, sparking clashes along the borders. A 1979 visit to Beijing earned Deng Xiaoping's agreement to end support for Thailand's communist movement; in return, the Thai authorities agreed to give safe haven to the Khmer Rouge forces fleeing west following the invasion of Cambodia. Revelations of the crimes of the defeated Khmer Rouge also sharply reduced the appeal of communism to the Thai public. Kriangsak's position as prime minister soon became untenable and he was forced to step down in February 1980 at a time of economic troubles. Kriangsak was succeeded by the army commander-in-chief, General Prem Tinsulanonda, a staunch royalist with a reputation for being incorruptible.

=== Vietnamese incursions ===
Between 1979 and 1988, Vietnamese occupation forces in Kampuchea made incursions into Thai territory, allegedly seeking rebel guerrillas they claimed were hiding in refugee camps (where many Laotians and Vietnamese refugees had also settled). Sporadic skirmishes continued along the border from 1985 to 1988, as Vietnamese troops periodically made cross border raids to wipe out Khmer Rouge border camps in Thailand, which along with China was a major supporter of the Khmer Rouge resistance. At times this led to direct combat with the Royal Thai Army, which drove back the intruders.

== Premiership of Prem (1980–1988) ==
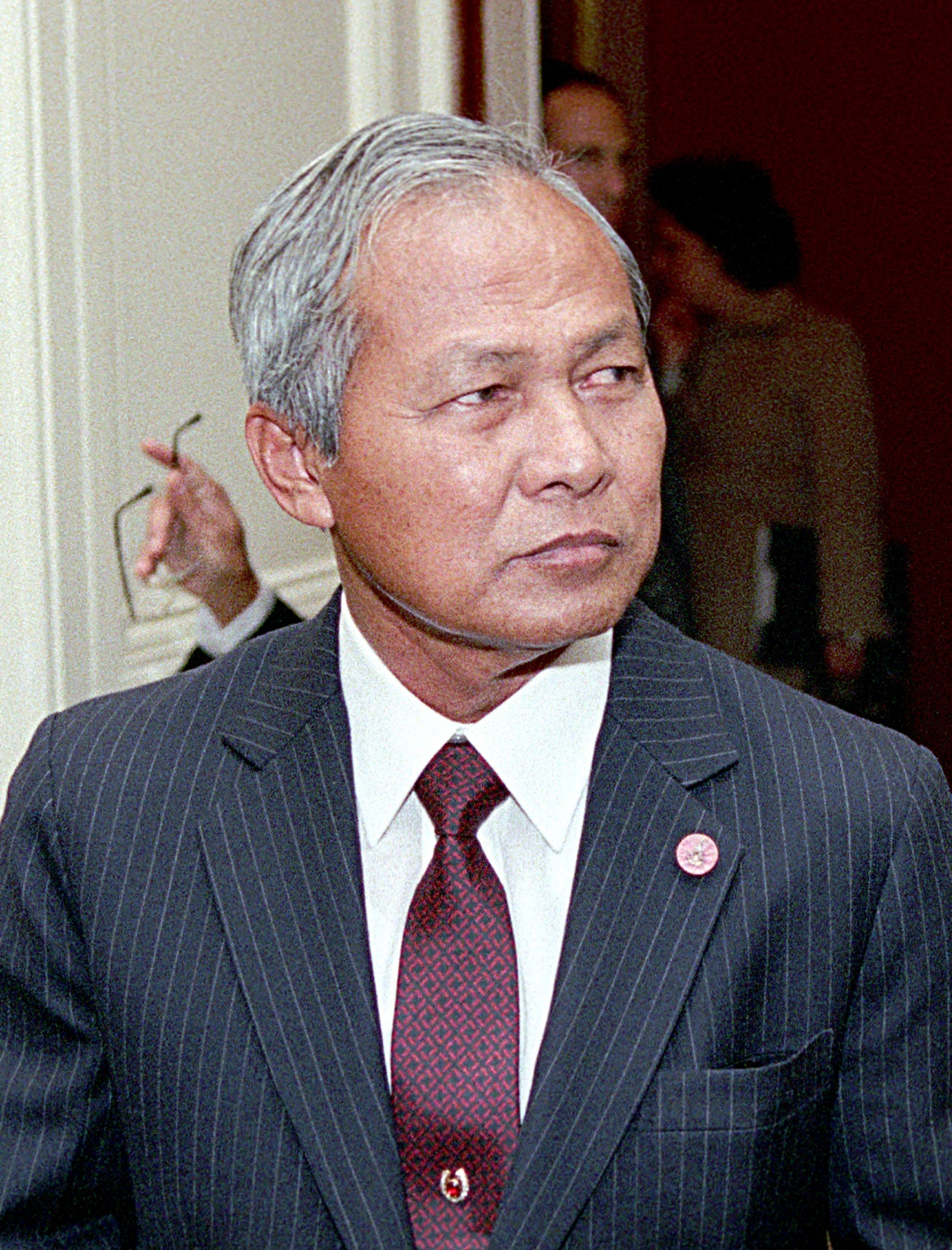
Prem Tinsulanonda, Prime Minister of Thailand from 1980 to 1988

Much of the 1980s saw a process of democratization overseen by King Bhumibol and Prem Tinsulanonda. The two preferred constitutional rule, and acted to put an end to violent military interventions.

In April 1981 a clique of junior army officers popularly known as the "Young Turks" staged a coup attempt, taking control of Bangkok. They dissolved the National Assembly and promised sweeping social changes. But their position quickly crumbled when Prem Tinsulanonda accompanied the royal family to Khorat. With King Bhumibol's support for Prem made clear, loyalist units under the palace favourite General Arthit Kamlang-ek managed to recapture the capital in an almost bloodless counterattack.

This episode further increased the prestige of the monarchy, and enhanced Prem's status as a relative moderate. A compromise was therefore reached. The insurgency ended and most of the ex-student guerillas returned to Bangkok under an amnesty. In December 1982, the Thai army Commander in Chief accepted flag of the Communist Party of Thailand at a widely publicized ceremony held in Banbak. Here, communist fighters and their supporters handed in their weapons and swore allegiance to the government. Prem declared the armed struggle over. The army returned to its barracks, and yet another constitution was promulgated, creating an appointed Senate to balance the popularly elected National Assembly. Elections were held in April 1983, giving Prem, now in the guise of a civilian politician, a large majority in the legislature (an arrangement which came to be known as "Premocracy").

Prem was also the beneficiary of the accelerating economic revolution which was sweeping south-east Asia. After the recession of the mid-1970s, economic growth took off. For the first time Thailand became a significant industrial power, and manufactured goods such as computer parts, textiles and footwear overtook rice, rubber and tin as Thailand's leading exports. With the end of the Indochina wars and the insurgency, tourism developed rapidly and became a major earner. The urban population continued to grow rapidly, but overall population growth began to decline, leading to a rise in living standards even in rural areas, although the Isaan continued to lag behind. While Thailand did not grow as fast as the "Four Asian Tigers," (namely Taiwan, South Korea, Hong Kong and Singapore) it achieved sustained growth, reaching an estimated $7100 GDP per capita (PPP) by 1990, approximately double its 1980 average.

Prem held office for eight years, surviving another coup in 1985 and two more general elections in 1983 and 1986, and remained personally popular, but the revival of democratic politics led to a demand for a more adventurous leader. In 1988 fresh elections brought former General Chatichai Choonhavan to power. Prem rejected the invitation offered by major political parties for the third term of premiership.

== Black May (1988–1992) ==
By allowing one faction of the military to get rich on government contracts, Chatichai provoked a rival faction, led by Generals Sunthorn Kongsompong, Suchinda Kraprayoon, and other generals of Class 5 of the Chulachomklao Royal Military Academy to stage the 1991 Thai coup d'état in February 1991, charging Chatichai's government as a corrupt regime or 'Buffet Cabinet'. The junta called itself the National Peace Keeping Council. The NPKC brought in a civilian prime minister, Anand Panyarachun, who was still responsible to the military. Anand's anti-corruption and straightforward measures proved popular. Another general election was held in March 1992.

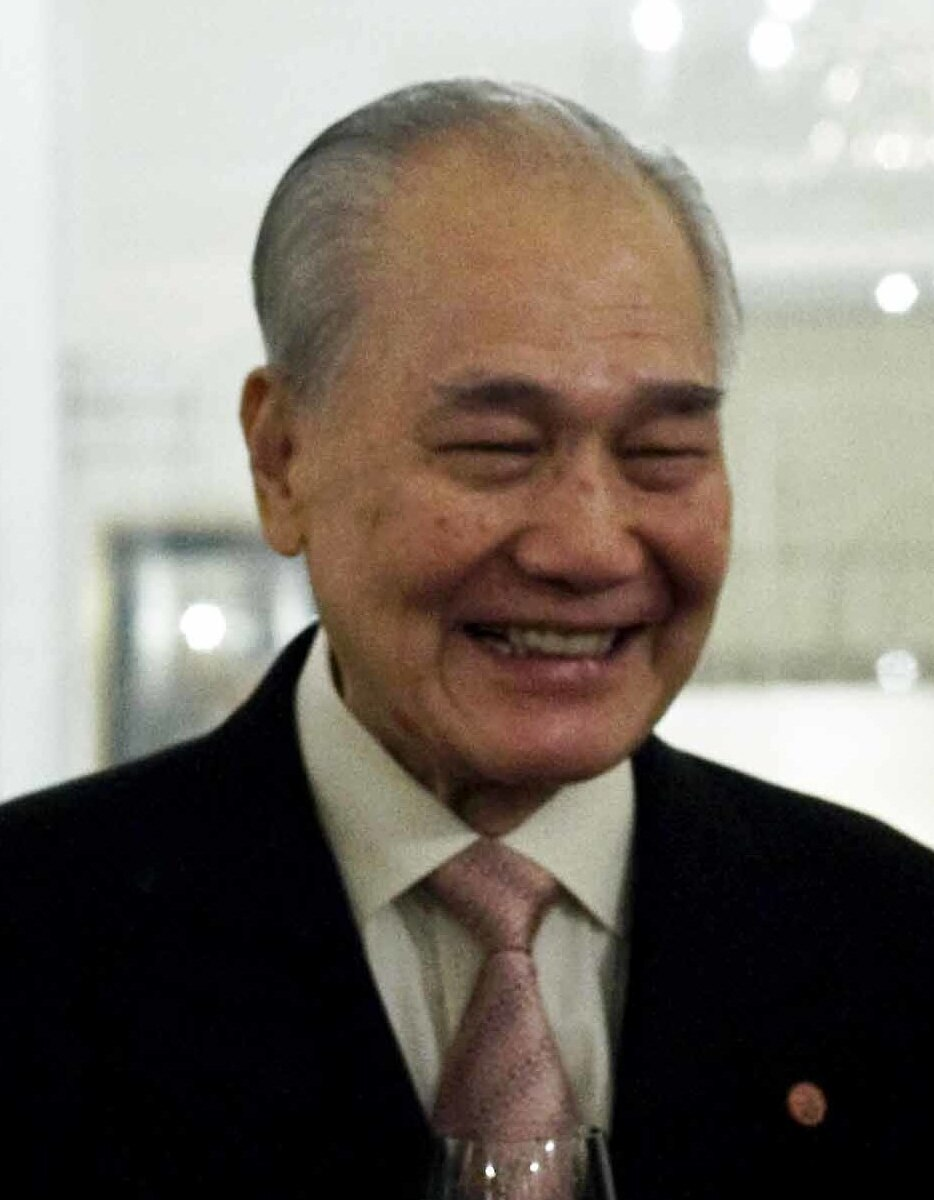
Anand Panyarachun, Prime Minister of Thailand, 1991–1992

The winning coalition appointed coup leader Suchinda Kraprayoon to become Prime Minister, in effect breaking a promise he had made earlier to King Bhumibol and confirming the widespread suspicion that the new government was going to be a military regime in disguise. However, the Thailand of 1992 was not the Siam of 1932. Suchinda's action brought hundreds of thousands of people out in the largest demonstrations ever seen in Bangkok, led by the former governor of Bangkok, Major-General Chamlong Srimuang.

Suchinda brought military units personally loyal to him into the city and tried to suppress the demonstrations by force, leading to a massacre and riots in the heart of the capital, Bangkok, in which hundreds died. Rumours spread out as there was a rift in the armed forces. Amidst the fear of civil war, King Bhumibol intervened: he summoned Suchinda and Chamlong to a televised audience, and urged them to follow the peaceful solution. This meeting resulted in Suchinda's resignation.

== People's constitution (1992–1997) ==
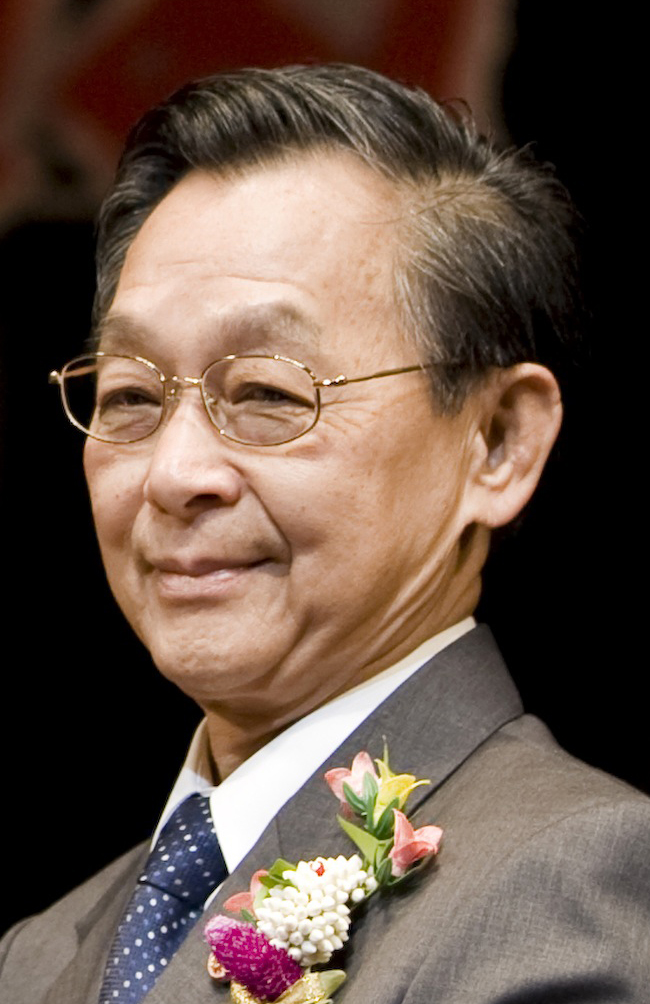
Chuan Leekpai, Prime Minister of Thailand, 1992–1995, 1997–2001

King Bhumibol re-appointed royalist Anand as interim prime minister until elections could be held in September 1992, which brought the Democrat Party under Chuan Leekpai to power, mainly representing the voters of Bangkok and the south. Chuan was a competent administrator who held power until 1995, when he was defeated at elections by a coalition of conservative and provincial parties led by Banharn Silpa-Archa. Tainted by corruption charges from the very beginning, Banharn's government was forced to call early elections in 1996, in which General Chavalit Yongchaiyudh's New Aspiration Party managed to gain a narrow victory.

The 1997 Constitution was the first constitution to be drafted by a popularly elected Constitutional Drafting Assembly, and was popularly called the "people's constitution". The 1997 Constitution created a bicameral legislature consisting of a 500-seat House of Representatives (สภาผู้แทนราษฎร, sapha phu thaen ratsadon) and a 200-seat Senate (วุฒิสภา, wutthisapha). For the first time in Thai history, both houses were directly elected.

Many human rights were explicitly acknowledged, and measures were established to increase the stability of elected governments. The House was elected by the first past the post system, where only one candidate with a simple majority could be elected in one constituency. The Senate was elected based on the provincial system, where one province could return more than one senator depending on its population size.

The two houses of the National Assembly have two different terms. In accordance with the constitution the Senate is elected to a six-year term, while the House is elected to a four-year term. Overall the term of the National Assembly is based on that of the House. The National Assembly each year will sit in two sessions: an "ordinary session" and a "legislative session". The first session of the National Assembly must take place within thirty days after the general election of the House of Representatives. The first session must be opened by the king in person by reading a Speech from the Throne; this ceremony is held in the Ananta Samakhom Throne Hall. He may also appoint the crown prince or a representative to carry out this duty. It is also the duty of the king to prorogue sessions through a royal decree when the House term expires. The king also has the prerogative to call extraordinary sessions and prolong sessions upon advice of the House of Representatives.

The National Assembly may host a "joint-sitting" of both Houses under several circumstances. These include: The appointment of a regent, any alteration to the 1924 Palace Law of Succession, the opening of the first session, the announcement of policies by the Cabinet of Thailand, the approval of the declaration of war, the hearing of explanations and approval of a treaty and the amendment of the Constitution.

Members of the House of Representatives served four-year terms, while senators served six-year terms. The 1997 People's Constitution also promoted human rights more than any other constitution. The court system (ศาล, san) included a constitutional court with jurisdiction over the constitutionality of parliamentary acts, royal decrees, and political matters.

== Financial crisis (1997–2001) ==
Soon after coming into office, Prime Minister Chavalit was confronted by the Asian Financial Crisis in 1997. After coming under strong criticism for his handling of the crisis, Chavilit resigned in November 1997 and Chuan returned to power. Chuan came to an agreement with the International Monetary Fund which stabilised the currency and allowed IMF intervention on the Thai economic recovery. In contrast to the country's previous history, the crisis was resolved by civilian rulers under democratic procedures.

During the 2001 election Chuan's agreement with the IMF and use of injection funds to boost the economy were a cause for great debate, whilst Thaksin's policies appealed to the mass electorate. Thaksin campaigned effectively against the old politics, corruption, organized crime, and drugs. In January 2001 he had a sweeping victory at the polls, winning a larger popular mandate (40%) than any Thai prime minister has ever had in a freely elected National Assembly.

== See also ==
- History of Thailand (1932–1973)
- History of Thailand (2001–present)
- History of Thailand
