= Tanong Po-arn =

Thai labour union leader, disappeared in 1991

- ทนง โพธิ์อ่าน
- Born: 1935
- Disappeared: June 19, 1991 (aged 55–56); Bangkok, Thailand
- Status: Missing for 35 years and 23 days

Tanong Po-arn (Thai: ทนง โพธิ์อ่าน; RTGS: thanong pho an) was a Thai labour union leader who disappeared following the 1991 Thai coup d'état by National Peace Keeping Council against the elected government.

== Thai labour leader ==
Tanong Po-arn was President of the Labour Congress of Thailand. He played an important role in negotiating with the government of Prime Minister Chatichai Choonhavan to secure the creation of a comprehensive national social security system.

He was also a Thai senator and the vice-president of the International Confederation of Free Trade Unions - Asia Pacific Regional Organization (ICFTU-APRO).

== The 1991 coup ==
On 23 February 1991, the military National Peace Keeping Council (NPKC) staged the 1991 Thai coup d'état against the government, declared martial law, and abrogated the constitution. Soon after the coup, the NPKC abolished labour unions in state enterprises, leaving over 270,000 union members without trade union rights. Tanong was publicly critical of the NPKC.

== Disappearance ==
Tanong was scheduled to appear at the International Labour Organization (ILO) annual meeting in Switzerland in June 1991 to speak about the restrictions placed on Thai trade union activity. The NPKC denied Tanong permission to attend the conference. Tanong reported that he was followed everywhere and received numerous anonymous death threats. He told his family: "If for three days I don't contact you, that means I have been arrested; if it's more than seven days, that means I have already died".

On 19 June 1991 Tanong's empty car was found near his office in Rat Burana District, Bangkok. After his disappearance his family feared for his health, as Tanong, age 55, was an insulin-dependent diabetic who did not have his medication with him when he was last seen. His wife said; "I sent letters to every government organization to ask for information on his disappearance, but received only silence from them."

== Investigations and protests ==
Two committees were established to investigate Tanong Pho-arn's whereabouts, one in the Ministry of the Interior in 1992 and the other in parliament. Reports of these investigations have never been made public. Amnesty International, the International Confederation of Free Trade Unions (ICFTU), and other trade unions have called on the Thai government to make these reports public and to initiate proper investigations.

In January 2003, Prime Minister Thaksin Shinawatra allowed the Tanong Po-arn case to be included with the cases of the missing protesters of Black May, the bloody 1992 uprising that led to the downfall of the NPKC. It was hoped that Thaksin's decision would open up the possibility that more information could be found regarding Tanong's fate. His whereabouts remain unknown and he is feared dead. During May Day celebrations, rallying workers can sometimes be seen wearing shirts with Tanong's image.

== See also ==
- List of people who disappeared mysteriously (2000–present)
