= 1991 Thai coup d'état =

1991 coup in Thailand

1991 Thai coup d'etat
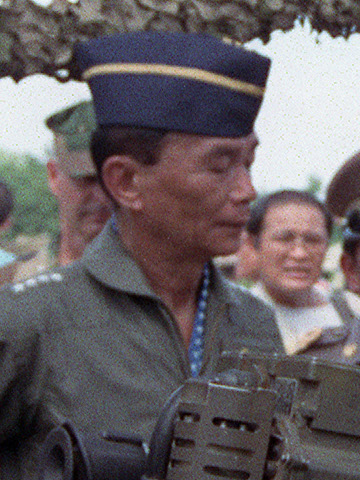
- Sunthorn Kongsompong coup leaders
Date	23 February 1991; 35 years ago
Location	Thailand
Result	Successful military and police takeover: Prime Minister Chatichai Choonhavan removed; Chatichai government dissolved; 1978 Constitution repealed; Military junta, the National Peace Keeping Council (NPKC), appointed by Bhumibol; Anand Panyarachun endorsed by Bhumibol as Prime Minister; 1991 constitutions by NPKC enacted

Belligerents
Royal Thai Armed Forces; Royal Thai Police	Chatichai Cabinet

Commanders and leaders
(Thailand) Sunthorn Kongsompong (Thailand) Suchinda Kraprayoon (Thailand) Isarapong Noonpakdee (Thailand) Praphat Kritsanachan (Thailand) Kaset Rojananil	Chatichai Choonhavan; Arthit Kamlang-ek

Strength
Thai military +283,000	None

Casualties and losses
None	None

The 1991 Thai coup d'état was a military coup against the democratic Chatichai government, carried out by Thai military leaders on 23 February. Although the figure head was Sunthorn Kongsompong, there was a military influence from military leaders, Chavalit Yongchaiyudh, Suchinda Kraprayoon, and Kaset Rojananil in the conflict. Chalerm Yubamrung, a politician, was also involved in the beginning of the conflict which began since 1990 but reached the peak in February 1991 due to a strong executive order of Chatichai. Later in May 1992, protesters calling for democracy were massacred by the military regime, known as 'Black May.'

== Background ==
Prem Tinsulanonda, a democratically inclined strongman who restored parliamentary politics, stepped down from eight year premiership in 1988. Prem defeated two coups in his term, the 1981 Thai military rebellion and the 1985 Thai coup d'état attempt. Prem consulted with Chavalit Yongchaiyudh, commander of the Royal Thai Armed Forces and chose Chatichai Choonhavan as the next candidate. Chatichai's Thai Nation Party won the most votes in the 1988 Thai general election, resulting in Chatichai being appointed prime minister on 4 August 1988. This made Chatichai the first democratically elected head of government after 12 years of dictatorship and "semi-democracy".

== Prelude ==
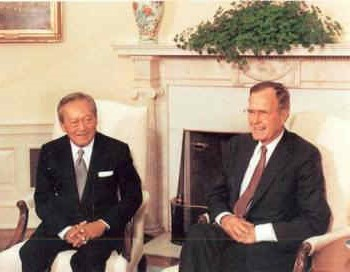
President George Bush and Prime Minister Chatichai Choonhavan at the White House in 1990

In 1990, Under Chatichai premiership, Chavalit was appointed as Defence Minister and Deputy Prime Minister. Group of top military personnel within the government side such as, Suchinda Kraprayoon and Kaset Rojananil, classmates in the Armed Forces Academies Preparatory School Class 5, had a good relationship with Chatichai. Nevertheless, Chavalit and the military had an ongoing conflict with Chalerm Yubamrung, Minister for Office of the Prime Minister, overseeing the Mass Communications Organization of Thailand. Chavalit then resigned from his position on 11 June.

On 17 June 1990, Chalerm ordered the trailer-mounted radio station, belonging to the MCOT, out of fear of a coup from military radio broadcasting. 19 June, Chavalit had a meeting with top military leaders all over the country. Chatichai called Chavalit to come back but Chavalit rejected. Three days later, Sunthorn seized Chalerm's trailer.

Later in August, Arthit Kamlang-ek, the leader of the opposition party, joined the government side. That built up more conflict in the parliament. Military leaders pressured Chatichai to dismiss Chalerm, and Chatichai followed it on 8 November but kept Chalerm as Deputy Education Minister. The military decided to announce no support to the Premier, based on the rumor circulating that Chatichai planned to dismiss Suchinda and Sunthorn.

The tension between the military and Chatichai reached its peak in February 1991, when Chatichai dismissed police chief to intimidate the military leadership. Sunthorn interfered with government work related to the police about Manoonkrit Roopkachorn murder attempt case in 1982. Chatichai got angry and had been trying to appoint Arthit as the new Deputy Defense Minister. On 22 February, amid fear of a military coup, Chatichai brought police to guard his house, then fled to Chiang Mai with Arthit to witness the inauguration by King Bhumibol in Bhubing Palace.

== Coup ==
Chatichai Choonhavan and Arthit Kamlang-ek were arrested by Royal Thai Air Force men in an airforce base in Chiang Mai before taking off to Bangkok on 23 February 1991, ended the longest prime minister tenure ever served as democratic leader elected in Southeast Asia at that time. In Bangkok, hundreds of full-gear armed soldiers and armored cars took over the Government House. The radio and television stations were captured, announcing the statements urging people to remain peaceful.

Royal Thai Armed Forces's branches successfully formed National Peace Keeping Council (NPKC), led by Sunthorn Kongsompong, aided by army chief Suchinda Kraprayoon, navy chief Praphat Kritsanachan, air force chief Kaset Rojananil, and Deputy army commander Isarapong Noonpakdee. In the announcement, it also included Royal Thai Police. In the afternoon, 1st Division Army in Bangkok captured strategic locations, Sunthorn declared coup success as he became a caretaker prime minister. The junta also arrested Chatichai's family and his assistants.

The alleged reasons for coup against the democratic government were corruption, cabinet ministers power corrupt, parliamentary dictatorship, military unity and solidarity was curbing, and alleged involvement in murder case and attempted overthrown of the monarchy of Manoonkrit Roopkachorn presence in the government.

Three days later, on 26 February, King Bhumibol Adulyadej approved the coup, and never before in the history, the king criticised Chatichai government that 'failed to gain the people's confidence' and "failed to maintain peace and order in the country.' Bhumibol also urged people 'to remain calm' and called the military 'to follow the orders' of Sunthorn.

Sunthorn formally accepted the king's appointment at the Thai Army Auditorium, to celebrate the royal approval, the junta leaders toasted each other with champagne in a televised ceremony. The SET index value revived to the same value as pre-coup, after it went down by 7%.

Conflict between Armed Forces Academies Preparatory School Class 5 and Class 7 was one of the root causes according to Tamada.

== Aftermath ==
The United States immediately suspended $16 million aid for military and economic development projects .

=== 1991 constitutions ===
The National Peace Keeping Council (NPKC), the coupmakers appointed a new unicameral national assembly of 292 military officers and supporters, headed by Ukrit Mongkolnavin. Ukrit and appointed Premier Anand Panyarachun were tasked with drafting a permanent constitution. The drafting of a new constitution became a virtual battleground between the military and its opponents. The military favored a position of continued strength, a larger and more powerful NPKC-appointed senate with power over an elected house, a larger privy council, and the ability for non-elected officials to become cabinet members. This last clause allowed an acting military leader to become premier. The public mobilized to protest the draft, with 50,000 people demonstrating at Sanam Luang on 19 November 1991, the largest protest in Thailand since 1976. King Bhumibol intervened in his 4 December birthday speech, urging the public to accept the draft and noting that "procedures or principles that we have imported for use are sometimes not suitable to the conditions of Thailand or the character of Thai people."

=== Disappearance of Tanong Po-arn ===
Tanong Po-arn was President of the Labour Congress of Thailand. He played an important role in negotiating with the government to secure the creation of a comprehensive national social security system. Soon after the coup, the NPKC abolished labour unions in state enterprises, leaving over 270,000 union members without trade union rights. Tanong was publicly critical of the NPKC.

Tanong was scheduled to appear at the International Labour Organization (ILO) annual meeting in Switzerland in June 1991 to speak about the restrictions placed on Thai trade union activity. The NPKC denied Tanong permission to attend the conference. Tanong reported that he was followed everywhere and received numerous anonymous death threats. On 19 June 1991 Tanong was disappeared, with his empty car found near his office Rat Burana District, Bangkok.

=== Black May ===
The 1991 constitution allowed Suchinda Kraprayoon to be appointed as prime minister. That caused 17–20 May 1992 popular protest in Bangkok against the government of Suchinda and the military crackdown that followed. Up to 200,000 people demonstrated in central Bangkok at the height of the protests. The military crackdown resulted in 52 government-confirmed deaths, hundreds of injuries including journalists, over 3,500 arrests, hundreds of disappearances, and eyewitness reports of a truck filled with bodies leaving the city. Many of those arrested are alleged to have been tortured.

== See also ==
- Black May (1992)
- 1985 Thai coup d'état attempt
- Manoonkrit Roopkachorn
