= Order of Rama =

Thai military award

The Honourable Order of Rama เครื่องราชอิสริยาภรณ์อันมีศักดิ์ รามาธิบดี
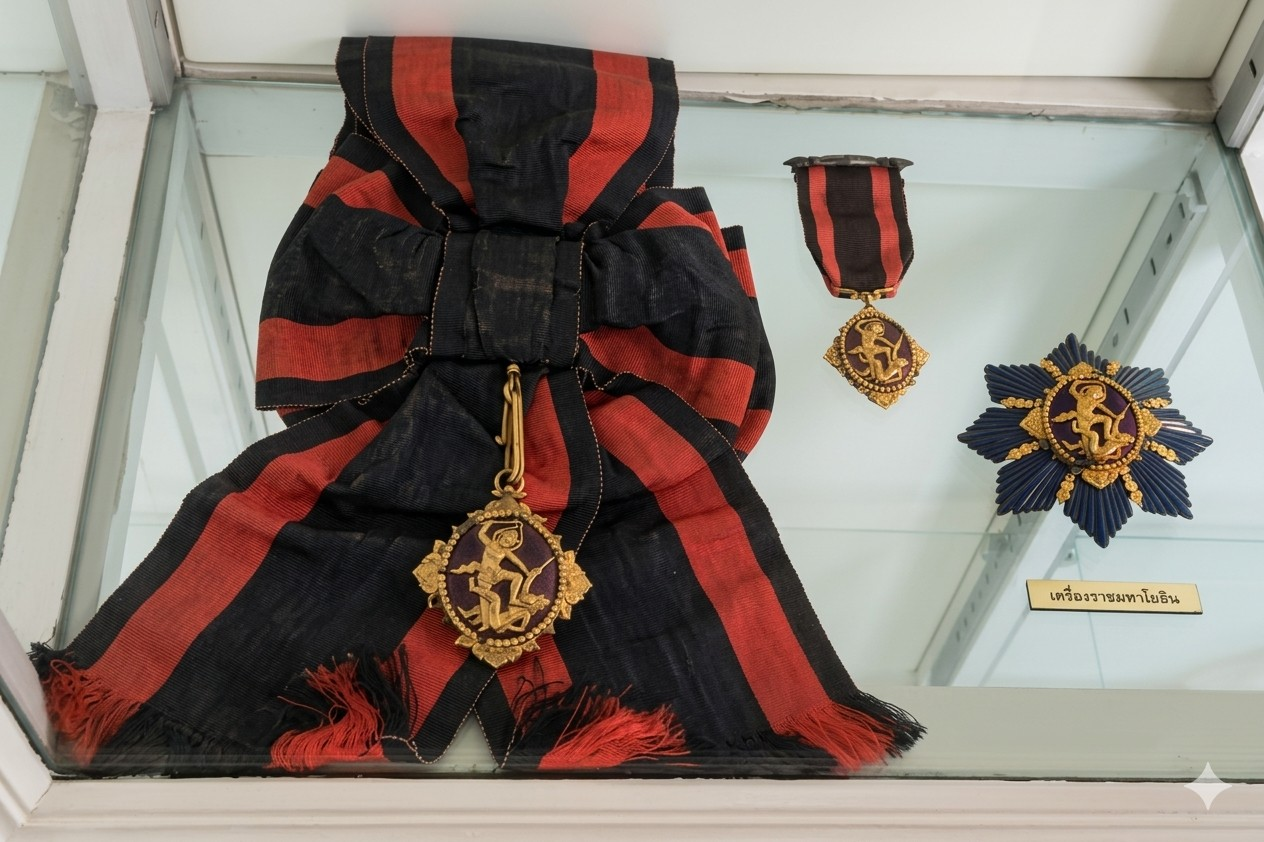
- Knight Grand Commander (First Class) of the Order of Rama

Awarded by the King of Thailand
- Type: Military Decoration
- Established: 22 July 1918
- Eligibility: Military personnel and Foreign Heads of State who are Military personnel
- Awarded for: Military personnel who displays conspicuous bravery, or some daring or pre-eminent act of valour or self-sacrifice, or extreme devotion to duty in the presence of the enemy or in times of peace
- Status: Currently awarded
- Founder: King Vajiravudh
- Sovereign: King Vajiralongkorn
- Grades: 4 Classes and 2 Medals

Statistics
- First induction: 22 July 1918
- Last induction: 30 May 1998

Precedence
- Next (higher): Ratana Varabhorn Order of Merit (Former orders)
- Next (lower): Order of the White Elephant
- Ribbon bar of the "Senangapati" Knight Grand Commander of the Honourable Order of Rama

The Honourable Order of Rama (Thai: เครื่องราชอิสริยาภรณ์อันมีศักดิ์รามาธิบดี; RTGS: Khrueang Ratcha-itsariyaphon An Mi Sak Ramathibodi) was established on 22 July 1918 (B.E. 2461) by King Rama VI of the Kingdom of Siam (now Thailand), to be bestowed onto those who have rendered special military services either in peace or in wartime.

Currently, the Order of Rama is divided into 6 classes, with His Majesty the King as the head of the Order, with the "Senangapati" class being the highest. The Royal Ceremony for the bestowal of the Order of Rama involves both old and new recipients of the Order participating in a ceremony in the presence of His Majesty the King, which includes the Royal Ceremony of Taking the Oath of Allegiance. Wearing this Order of Rama should only be done at events related to military affairs, where there is a specific schedule specifying that the Order of Rama sash should be worn.

== History ==
His Majesty King Vajiravudh (Rama VI) remarked that "Military service is a special undertaking, requiring those performing it to exert tremendous physical and intellectual effort, and to always be ready to sacrifice their lives for the nation and to preserve its independence and promote its prosperity. It is fitting that there should be a special order of merit to reward those who perform well in this field." Therefore, His Majesty created an order of merit to reward those who excelled in military service, beginning on July 22, 1918. The first awards were bestowed upon soldiers and volunteers who participated in World War I. The order was divided into four classes, along with medals. The Ministry of the Privy Seal was entrusted with its creation. Simultaneously, a royal advisory committee was established for the order, consisting of:

- One president;
- One secretary;
- Five advisors;

to advise on who is worthy of receiving this order of merit. and then bring the matter up to be presented to His Majesty the King to request further royal permission.

The advisory committee for this royal decoration has been appointed twice. During the reign of King Vajiravudh, he a royal decree appointing:-

- HRH Prince Chakrabongse Bhuvanath as the head of the committee,
- Phraya Siharatdechochai (Yaem Na Nagara) as the secretary,
- HRH Prince Bhanurangsi Savangwongse as an advisor,
- HRH Prince Paribatra Sukhumbandhu as an advisor,
- HRH Prince Abhakara Kiartivongse as an advisor,
- Mom Chao Bhandhupravati Kshemasanta as an advisor,
- Phraya Prasitsupphakarn (Mom Luang Fuea Phuengbun) as an advisor.

The second advisory committee for the Order of Rama was appointed during the reign of King Prajadhipok. The King issued a royal decree appointing:

- HRH Prince Paribatra Sukhumbandhu as the head of the committee,
- Phra Asasongkhram (Toi Hastisevi) as the secretary;
- HRH Prince Purachatra Jayakara as an advisor;
- HRH Prince Vudhijaya Chalermlabha as an advisor;
- Mom Chao Boworadet Kritakara as an advisor;
- Mom Chao Alongkot Sukhasvasti as an Advisor.
- Phraya Chalerm Akat (Suni Suvarnapradip) served as an advisor.

However, after the Siamese revolution of 1932, the granting of this order of merit was temporarily suspended. It wasn't until the Order of Rama Act was enacted in 1960 to adapt to current circumstances, including the abolition of the Order's Advisory Committee, that the granting of this order of merit resumed and continues to this day.

== Classes ==
The order consists of six classes:

Ribbon	Class	Name	Postnominals	Order of precedence	Insignia
	Knight Grand Commander (First Class)	เสนางคะบดี "Senangapati" (RTGS: Senangkhabodi)	SR	7	Insignia consists of a pendant, on a black sash with red trim, worn over the right shoulder to the left hip. Also a star, worn on the left chest.
	Knight Commander (Second Class)	มหาโยธิน "Maha Yodhin" (RTGS: Maha Yothin)	MR	14	Insignia consists of a pendant, worn on a silk band on the collar. Also a star, worn on the right chest.
	Commander (Third Class)	โยธิน "Yodhin" (RTGS: Yothin)	YR	19	Insignia consists of a pendant, worn on a silk band on the collar.
	Companion (Fourth Class)	อัศวิน "Asvin" (RTGS: Atsawin)	AR	22	Insignia consists of a pendant, worn on a silk band on the left chest.
	(Fifth Class)	เหรียญรามมาลาเข็มกล้ากลางสมร; Member of "The Rama Medal for Gallantry in Action" (RTGS: Rian Ram Mala Khem Kla Klang Samon)	RMK	The Highest of Medal for Acts of Bravery	Insignia consists of a silver medal with bar.
	(Sixth Class)	เหรียญรามมาลา; Member of "The Rama Medal" (RTGS: Rian Ram Mala)	RM	2nd of the Highest of Medal for Acts of Bravery	Insignia consists of a silver medal.

== Selected recipients ==
Certificate for the Knight Grand Commander of Order of Rama, given to Field Marshal Thanom Kittikachorn by King Bhumibol Adulyadej of Thailand on 10 May 1965, countersigned by Prince Wan Waithayakon, deputy prime minister.

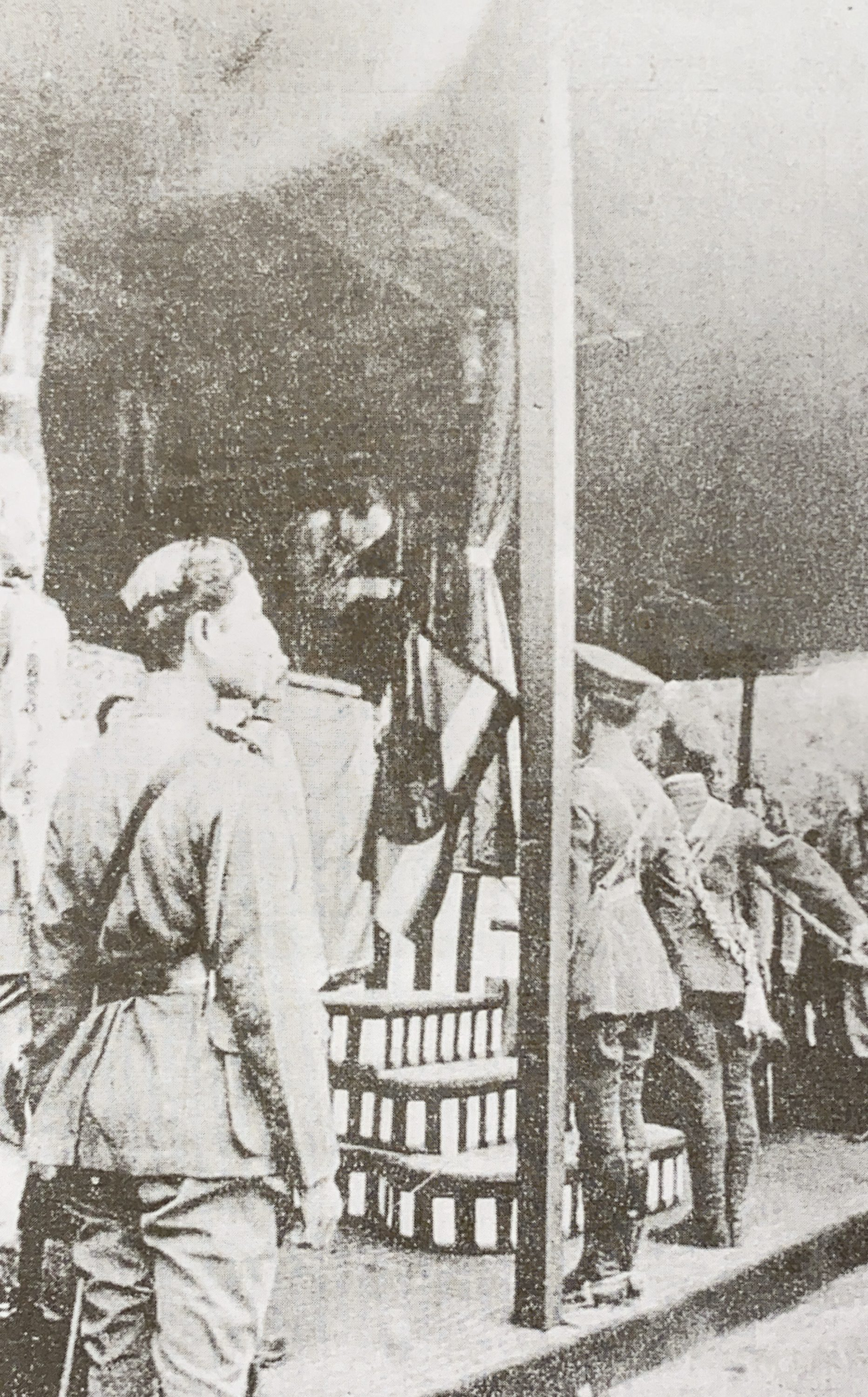
King Vajiravudh gave the badge of the Commander of the Order of Rama to the colours of the Siamese Expeditionary Forces Motor corps at Sanam Luang, in September 21, 1919

=== Knight Grand Commander ===
- Ferdinand Foch
- Douglas Haig, 1st Earl Haig
- Philippe Pétain
- Joseph Joffre
- Américo Tomás
- Francisco Franco
- Ayub Khan
- Sarit Thanarat
- Thanom Kittikachorn
- Praphas Charusathien
- Augusto Pinochet
- Prem Tinsulanonda

=== Knight Commander ===
- Yugala Dighambara
- Abhakara Kiartivongse
- Chavalit Yongchaiyudh
- Arthit Kamlang-ek
- Dawee Chullasapya

=== Commander ===
- Amornthat Kridakorn
- Narongdet Nantaphodet

=== Companion ===
- Isarapong Noonpakdee
- Sunthorn Kongsompong

=== The Rama Medal for Gallantry in Action ===
- Seripisut Temiyavet
- Prayuth Chan-o-cha
- Thanasak Patimaprakorn
- Somphian Aeksomya

=== The Rama Medal ===
- Udomdej Sitabutr
- Surayud Chulanont

=== Order of Rama for military units ===
- Siamese Expeditionary Forces Motor corps- Commander of the Order of Rama
- 21st Infantry Regiment, Queen Sirikit's Guard - The Rama Medal for Gallantry in Action

=== Order of Rama for military memorials ===
- Tomb of the Unknown Soldier (Arlington National Cemetery) - The Rama Medal for Gallantry in Action
