= Labour Congress of Thailand =

LCT
- Founded: 1973-4, 1978
- Headquarters: Samutprakarn, Thailand
- Location: Thailand
- Key people: Prathuang Saengsang, president
- Affiliations: ITUC

The Labour Congress of Thailand (LCT, Thai: สภาองค์การลูกจ้างสภาแรงงานแห่งประเทศไทย) is a trade union federation in Thailand which emerged following the fall of the military dictatorship in Thailand in 1973. Its first leader was Phaisan Thawatchaianan. Following the military coup of 1976 the LCT was forced to cease operations, but re-emerged at the end of 1977. Despite the anti-labour conditions of military-ruled Thailand at this time, the LCT was involved in campaigns for raising minimum wages, lifting the ban on strikes, opposing basic food price rises and seeking reform of tripartite bodies.

During the early 1980s factional differences emerged in the LCT, chiefly over the federation's relationship to political parties and the military. The faction associated with Phaisan, which sought independence from political and military figures, was defeated and left the organisation to form the Thai Trade Union Congress (TTUC).

In 1985 leaders of the LCT were arrested on charges of rebellion for supporting an attempted coup d'etat by the Young Turk military faction.

Former LCT president Tanong Po-arn, Thailand's most prominent labour leader, disappeared after the 1991 Thai coup d'état. His whereabouts are still unknown, and he is feared dead.

The LCT is affiliated with the International Trade Union Confederation.
