= Suchinda Kraprayoon =

Prime Minister of Thailand in 1992

General Suchinda Kraprayoon MPCh MWM ThChW
- สุจินดา คราประยูร
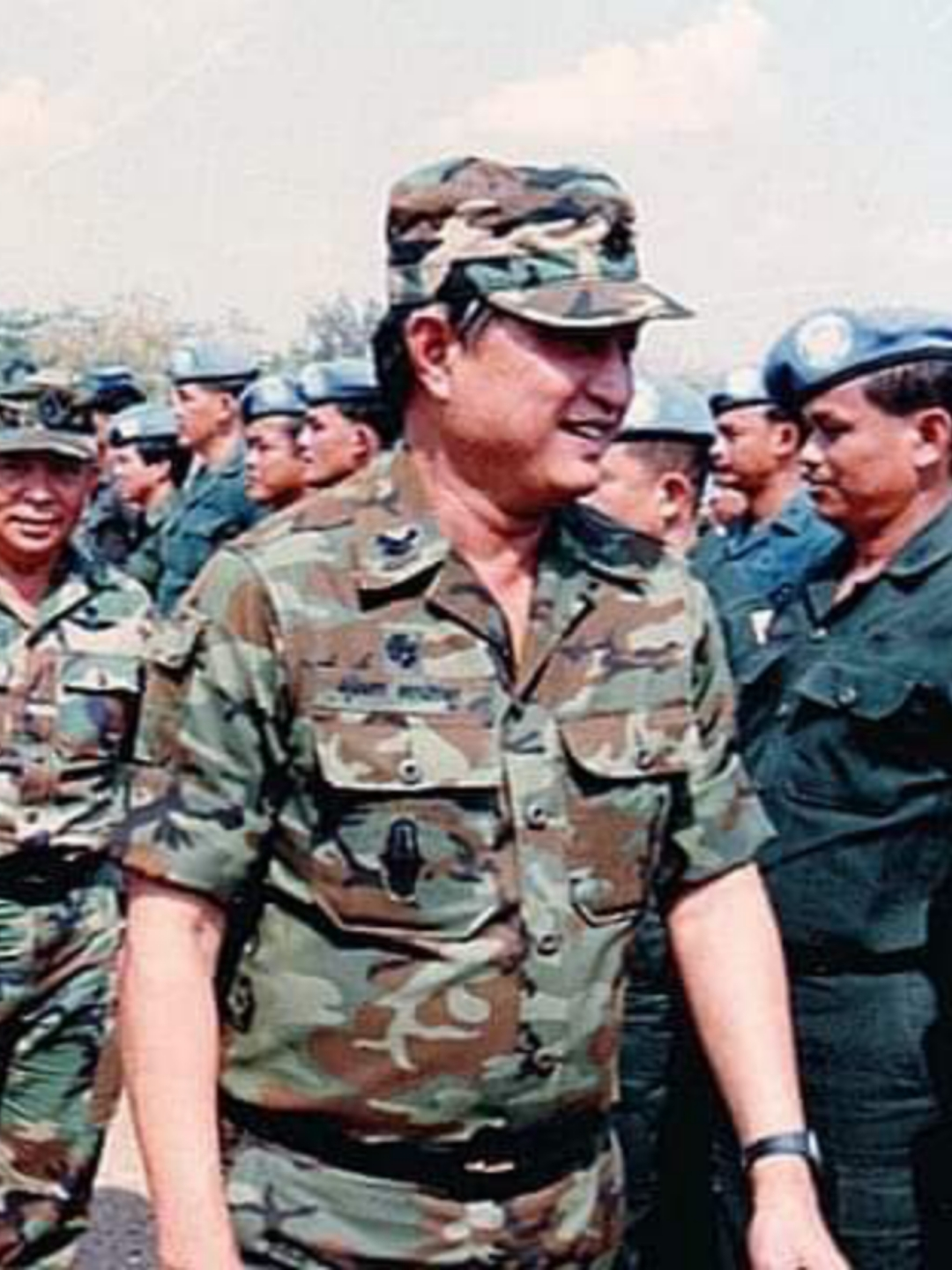
- Suchinda in 1992

19th Prime Minister of Thailand
- In office 7 April 1992 – 24 May 1992
- Monarch: Bhumibol Adulyadej
- Deputy: Meechai Ruchuphan; Narong Wongwan; Somboon Rahong; Montree Pongpanich; Samak Sundaravej
- Preceded by: Anand Panyarachun
- Succeeded by: Meechai Ruchuphan (acting); Anand Panyarachun

Minister of Defence
- In office 17 April 1992 – 24 May 1992
- Prime Minister: Himself
- Preceded by: Praphat Kritsanajun
- Succeeded by: Banjob Bunnag

Supreme Commander of the Royal Thai Armed Forces
- In office 1 October 1991 – 4 April 1992
- Minister: Praphat Kritsanajun
- Preceded by: Sunthorn Kongsompong
- Succeeded by: Kaset Rojananil

Commander-in-chief of the Royal Thai Army
- In office 29 April 1990 – 7 April 1992
- Preceded by: Chavalit Yongchaiyudh
- Succeeded by: Isarapong Noonpakdee

Personal details
- Born: 6 August 1933 Thonburi, Krung Thep, Siam
- Died: 10 June 2025 (aged 91) Bangkok, Thailand
- Spouse: Wannee Noonpakdee
- Children: 2
- Education: Royal Military Academy
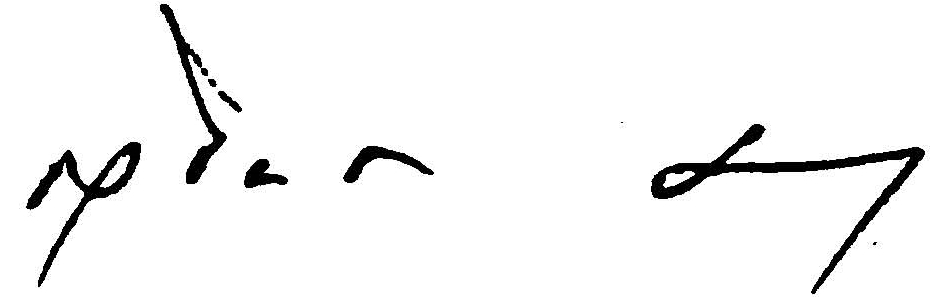
- Signature

Military service
- Allegiance: Thailand
- Branch: Royal Thai Army
- Service years: 1953–1992
- Rank: General; Admiral; Air Chief Marshal
- Conflicts: Vietnam War; Communist insurgency in Thailand
- Awards: see Honours

Suchinda Kraprayoon (Thai: สุจินดา คราประยูร, RTGS: Suchinda Khraprayun; 6 August 1933 – 10 June 2025) was a Thai military officer and politician who was the 19th prime minister of Thailand for several weeks in 1992.

As the commander-in-chief of the Royal Thai Army (1990–1992), Suchinda led the 1991 Thai coup d'état in February and was a member of the junta called "National Peace Keeping Council". A year after the coup on 7 April 1992, he was appointed prime minister. This sparked mass protests that were violently suppressed during Black May which finally led to his resignation on 24 May 1992.

== Early life and education ==
Suchinda, son of Juang and Sompong Kraprayoon, was born on 6 August 1933, in Thonburi, Siam, and was of mixed Chinese and Mon descent.

Suchinda first attended Wat Rajabopit School and later Amnuayslip School. He studied medicine at Chulalongkorn University in Bangkok for 12 months before entering the Chulachomklao Royal Military Academy. He graduated from Class 5 of the Academy, of which many students would join the National Peace Keeping Council. He also attended the US Army Command and General Staff Course at the Artillery Regiment, Fort Sill, Oklahoma, and the US Army Command and General Staff Course at Fort Leavenworth, Kansas.

== Military career ==
Suchinda returned to Thailand in 1953 to serve as a Second Lieutenant in the Royal Thai Army. On 25 January 1958 he became Troop Leader in an artillery infantry regiment. He was gradually promoted and given more responsibilities, including:

- Lecturer at Army Command and General Staff College
- Director-General of Operations Department
- Assisting Chief of Staff (Army Operations) of the Royal Thai Army
- Deputy Chief of Staff of the Royal Thai Army
- Sub-Commander of the Royal Thai Army
- Commander-in-Chief of the Royal Thai Army (29 April 1990)
- Commander-in-Chief of the Supreme Command Headquarters (1 October 1991)

During the Vietnam War, Suchinda was posted to a Thai unit supporting the U.S. war effort and later became an assistant military attaché in 1971 at the Thai Embassy in Washington.

== Coup, NPKC and premiership ==
Suchinda was a leader of the National Peace Keeping Council (NPKC), which conducted the 1991 Thai coup d'état that ousted the elected government of Prime Minister Chatichai Choonhavan on 23 February 1991. The NPKC installed former diplomat Anand Panyarachun as prime minister.

Royal intervention on the night of 20 May. Chamlong Srimuang (left) and Suchinda Kraprayoon (middle) submit to the King (seated)

After the general election on 22 March 1992, five parties (Rassadorn, Justice Unity, Social Action, Thai Citizen, Chart Thai) designated Suchinda as the prime minister. His appointment as prime minister on 7 April 1992 resulted in large protests, culminating in a general curfew and military deployment in Bangkok. In the event known as Black May, hundreds of people are believed to have died when soldiers opened fire on unarmed students and demonstrators during the protests. Further escalation was avoided by the intervention of King Bhumibol.

Suchinda resigned from the premiership on 24 May 1992. The Deputy Prime Minister, Meechai Ruchuphan, became caretaker prime minister for an interim period until the new government was assigned. He was succeeded by Anand Panyarachun.

== Post-downfall ==
After resigning, General Suchinda was appointed Chairman of Telecom Holdings, the holding company of Telecom Asia. Telecom Asia was awarded an unprecedented concession to build 2 million telephone lines in Bangkok after the NPKC seized power.

== Personal life and death ==
Suchinda married Khunying Wannee Kraprayoon (née Noonpakdee), sister of Isarapong Noonpakdee, Suchinda's classmate from military academy. The couple had two sons: Jerdwut Kraprayoon, a former adviser to the Royal Thai Army, and Janewit “Jack” Kraprayoon.

Suchinda died of natural causes at Phramongkutklao Hospital in Bangkok, on 10 June 2025, at the age of 91.

== Honours ==
- 1989 – Knight Grand Cordon of the Most Exalted Order of the White Elephant
- 1988 – Knight Grand Cordon of the Most Noble Order of the Crown of Thailand
- 1992 – Knight Grand Commander of the Most Illustrious Order of Chula Chom Klao
- 1973 – Victory Medal – Vietnam War, with flames
- 1988 – Freeman Safeguarding Medal – 1st Class
- 1970 – Border Service Medal
- 1968 – Chakra Mala Medal
- 1989 – First Class of Boy Scout Citation Medal of Vajira
- 1991 – King Rama IX Royal Cypher Medal 3rd Class

=== Foreign Honours ===
- Grand Cordon of the Order of the Sacred Treasure (1992)
- Courageous Commander of The Most Gallant Order of Military Service (P.G.A.T.) (1991)
- Army Commendation Medal (1970)
- Vietnam Armed Forces Honor Medal, First Class (1970)
- Vietnam Campaign Medal (1970)

=== Military rank ===
- General, Admiral and Air Chief Marshal

=== Volunteer Defense Corps of Thailand rank ===
- Volunteer Defense Corps Colonel

Political offices
Preceded by Anand Panyarachun	Prime Minister of Thailand; 1992	Succeeded by Meechai Ruchuphan
Preceded by Chavalit Yongchaiyudh	Commander-in-Chief of Royal Thai Army; 1990–1992	Succeeded by Isarapong Noonpakdee
