= Sunthorn Kongsompong =

20th-century Thai general

General Sunthorn Kongsompong MPCh MWM ThChW
- สุนทร คงสมพงษ์
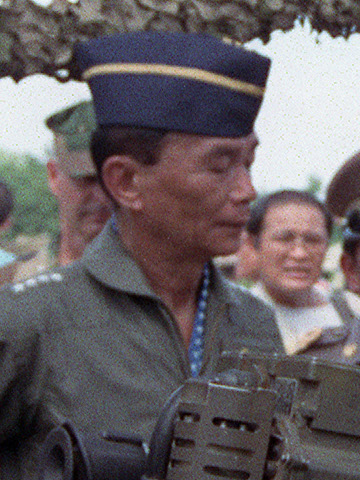

Acting Prime Minister of Thailand (Note: as Head of the National Peacekeeping Council)
- De facto 23 February 1991 – 1 March 1991
- Monarch: Bhumibol Adulyadej
- Preceded by: Chatichai Choonhavan (as Prime Minister)
- Succeeded by: Anand Panyarachun (as Prime Minister)

Chairman of the National Peace Keeping Council
- In office 24 February 1991 – 7 April 1992
- Preceded by: Office established
- Succeeded by: Office abolished

Supreme Commander of the Armed Forces
- In office 1 April 1990 – 30 September 1991
- Preceded by: Chavalit Yongchaiyudh
- Succeeded by: Suchinda Kraprayoon

Commander-in-Chief of the Royal Thai Army
- In office 31 March 1990 – 7 April 1992
- Preceded by: Chavalit Yongchaiyudh
- Succeeded by: Isarapong Noonpakdee

Member of the Senate of Thailand
- In office 2 May 1992 – 16 December 1994

Personal details
- Born: 1 August 1931 Bangkok, Krung Thep, Siam
- Died: 2 August 1999 (aged 68) Bangkok, Thailand
- Children: Apirat Kongsompong

Military service
- Allegiance: Thailand
- Branch/service: Royal Thai Army
- Rank: General; Admiral; Air Chief Marshal
- Commands: Commander-in-Chief; Supreme Commander

Sunthorn Kongsompong (also written as Sundhara; (Note: Thai: สุนทร คงสมพงษ์, RTGS: Sunthon Khongsomphong, IPA: [sǔn.tʰɔːn kʰoŋ.sǒm.pʰoŋ]) 1 August 1931 – 2 August 1999) was the de facto prime minister of Thailand from 1991 to 1992, after a military coup d'etat led by Sunthorn and General Suchinda Kraprayoon deposed the government of Prime Minister Chatichai Choonhavan on 23 February 1991. The generals accused Chatichai of corruption, and established the National Peace Keeping Council (NPKC) as an interim administration, with Sunthorn as chairman. Anand Panyarachun was appointed prime minister in March 1991, but the administration of the country was also executed by the NPKC.

Sunthorn left the political office following the May 1992 constitution promulgation, which prohibited members of the military from executing the premier's office.

His son was Apirat Kongsompong, who from 2018 to 2020 was Commander in Chief of the Royal Thai Army.

== Honours ==
=== Royal Decorations ===
- 1987 - Knight Grand Cordon of the Most Exalted Order of the White Elephant
- 1988 - Knight Grand Cordon of the Most Noble Order of the Crown of Thailand
- 1992 - Knight Grand Commander of the Most Illustrious Order of Chula Chom Klao
- 1990 - Companion of the Order of Rama
- 1955 - Victory Medal - Korean War
- 1973 - Victory Medal - Vietnam War with flames
- 1988 - Freemen Safeguarding Medal, First Class
- 1989 - Border Service Medal
- 1964 - Chakra Mala Medal
- 1989 - Boy Scout Citation Medal of Vajira, First Class
- 1991 - King Rama IX Royal Cypher Medal, First Class
- 1950 - King Rama IX Coronation Medal

=== Foreign Honours ===
- South Vietnam :
  - Gallantry Cross With Palm (1970)
  - Armed Forces Honor Medal, First class (1970)
  - Vietnam Campaign Medal (1970)
- USA :
  - Bronze Star Medal With "V" device (1970)
  - Army Commendation Medal With "V" device and Oak (1970)
- Malaysia :
  - Commander of the Order of Loyalty to the Crown of Malaysia (P.S.M.) (1987)
  - Courageous Commander of The Most Gallant Order of Military Service (P.G.A.T.) (1991)
- South Korea :
  - Order of National Security Merit, Tongil Medal (1990)
- Singapore :
  - Distinguished Service Order (Military) (1991)
- Japan :
  - Grand Cordon of the Order of the Sacred Treasure (1992)
- Indonesia :
  - Grand Meritorious Military Order Star, 1st Class
- UN :
  - United Nations Korea Medal

=== Unit Citation ===
- Presidential Unit Citation (South Korea)
- Civil Actions Medal Unit Citation (1970)

== Notes ==
Military offices
Preceded by Chavalit Yongchaiyudh	Supreme Commander of the Royal Thai Armed Forces; 1 April 1990 - 30 September 1991	Succeeded by Suchinda Kraprayoon
Political offices
Preceded by Chatichai Choonhavan as Prime Minister of Thailand	Chairman of the National Peace Keeping Council; 24 February 1991 - 7 April 1993; With: Anand Panyarachun as nominal Prime Minister from 2 March 1991	Succeeded by Suchinda Kraprayoon as Prime Minister of Thailand
