= Isarapong Noonpakdee =

Thai military officer (1933–2017)

Isarapong Noonpakdee MPCh MWM ThCh AR
- อิสระพงศ์ หนุนภักดี
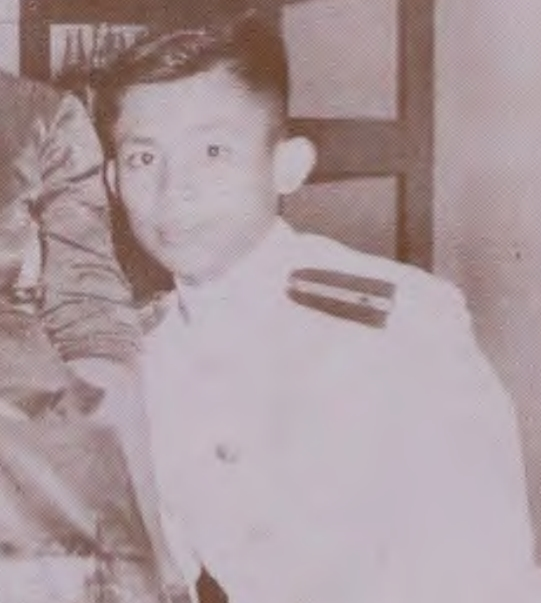
- Isarapong in 1958

Minister of Interior
- In office 6 March 1991 – 22 March 1992
- Prime Minister: Anand Panyarachun
- Preceded by: Pramarn Adireksarn
- Succeeded by: Anan Klintha

Commander-in-chief of the Royal Thai Army
- In office 7 April 1992 – 31 July 1992
- Preceded by: Suchinda Kraprayoon
- Succeeded by: Vimol Vongvanich

Personal details
- Born: 20 November 1933 Bangkok, Siam (now Bangkok, Thailand)
- Died: 17 February 2017 (aged 83) Ratchathewi, Bangkok, Thailand
- Spouse: Sumana Noonpakdee
- Education: Royal Military Academy
- Profession: Army officer; politician

Military service
- Allegiance: Thailand
- Branch/service: Royal Thai Army; Royal Thai Police; Volunteer Defense Corps
- Years of service: 1958–1992
- Rank: General; Police General; VDC Gen.
- Commands: Commander-in-Chief
- Battles/wars: Korean War; Vietnam War; Communist insurgency in Thailand
- Awards: Companion of the Order of Rama; Bravery Medal; Victory Medal - Korean War; Victory Medal - Vietnam War, with flames; Freemen Safeguarding Medal (First Class); Border Service Medal; Chakra Mala Medal

Isarapong Noonpakdee (Thai: อิสระพงศ์ หนุนภักดี; 20 November 1933 – 17 February 2017) was a Thai military officer who was Commander of the Royal Thai Army in 1992.

== Careers ==
Isarapong played a key role in the coup against the government of then Prime Minister Chatichai Choonhavan when he was deputy Army commander-in-chief. He became the secretary-general of the National Peacekeeping Council (NPKC) or the coup maker. Isarapong became the interior minister in the post-coup government of Anand Panyarachun. He later succeeded Suchinda Kraprayoon as Commander in Chief of the Royal Thai Army when Suchinda became the prime minister.

He has received the Bravery Medal in 1991.

== Honour ==
- 1989 - Knight Grand Cordon of the Most Exalted Order of the White Elephant
- 1987 - Knight Grand Cordon of the Most Noble Order of the Crown of Thailand
- 1992 - Knight Commander of the Most Illustrious Order of Chula Chom Klao
- 1990 - Companion of the Order of Rama
- 1990 - Bravery Medal
- 1961 - Victory Medal - Korean War
- 1973 - Victory Medal - Vietnam War with flames
- 1987 - Freemen Safeguarding Medal (First Class)
- 2019 - Border Service Medal
- 1964 - Chakra Mala Medal
- 1991 - Boy Scout Citation Medal of Vajira (First Class)
- 1991 - King Bhumibol Adulyadej Royal Cypher Medal (1st class)

=== Foreign honour ===
- Grand Cordon of the Order of the Sacred Treasure (1992)
- Bronze Star Medal With "V" device (1970)
- Army Commendation Medal (1970)
- Armed Forces Honor Medal, First Class (1970)
- United Nations Korea Medal
- Vietnam Campaign Medal (1970)
