= National Peace Keeping Council =

The National Peace Keeping Council, also referred to as National Peacekeeping Council (NPKC) (Thai: คณะรักษาความสงบเรียบร้อยแห่งชาติ), was a Thai military junta that overthrew the elected civilian government of Chatichai Choonhavan in the 1991 Thai coup d'état. It was led by Army Commander Suchinda Kraprayoon, Supreme Commander Sunthorn Kongsompong, Air Force Commander Kaset Rojananil, and members of the fifth class of Chulachomklao Royal Military Academy. After the March 1992 general election, General Suchinda was appointed prime minister. He resigned following a public uprising and pressure from King Bhumibol Adulyadej.

== Seizure of assets of the Chatichai cabinet ==
After seizing power from the Chatichai government, the junta seized the assets of Chatichai and nine members of his cabinet, including:

- General Chatichai Choonhavan, Prime Minister (284 million baht, approximately US$11 million)
- Subin Pinkhayan, Commerce Minister (608 million baht)
- Pithak Intharavitthayanand, aide to the prime minister (335 million baht)
- Montri Pongpanich, Transport Minister (336 million baht)
- Pol Gen Pramarn Adireksarn, Interior Minister (139 million baht)
- Phinya Chuayplod, Deputy Commerce Minister (61 million baht)

The junta set up a committee to investigate the cabinet for allegedly being "unusually rich". The supreme court later ruled on the cases and called for the return of the assets, because the politicians' wealth had been unlawfully seized by the military junta and the investigative committee had worked without the oversight of a judicial entity.

== See also ==
- Chamlong Srimuang
- Anand Panyarachun
- History of Thailand (1973–2001)
- Constitution of Thailand
