= Chatichai Choonhavan =

Prime Minister of Thailand from 1988 to 1991

General Chatichai Choonhavan
- ชาติชาย ชุณหะวัณ
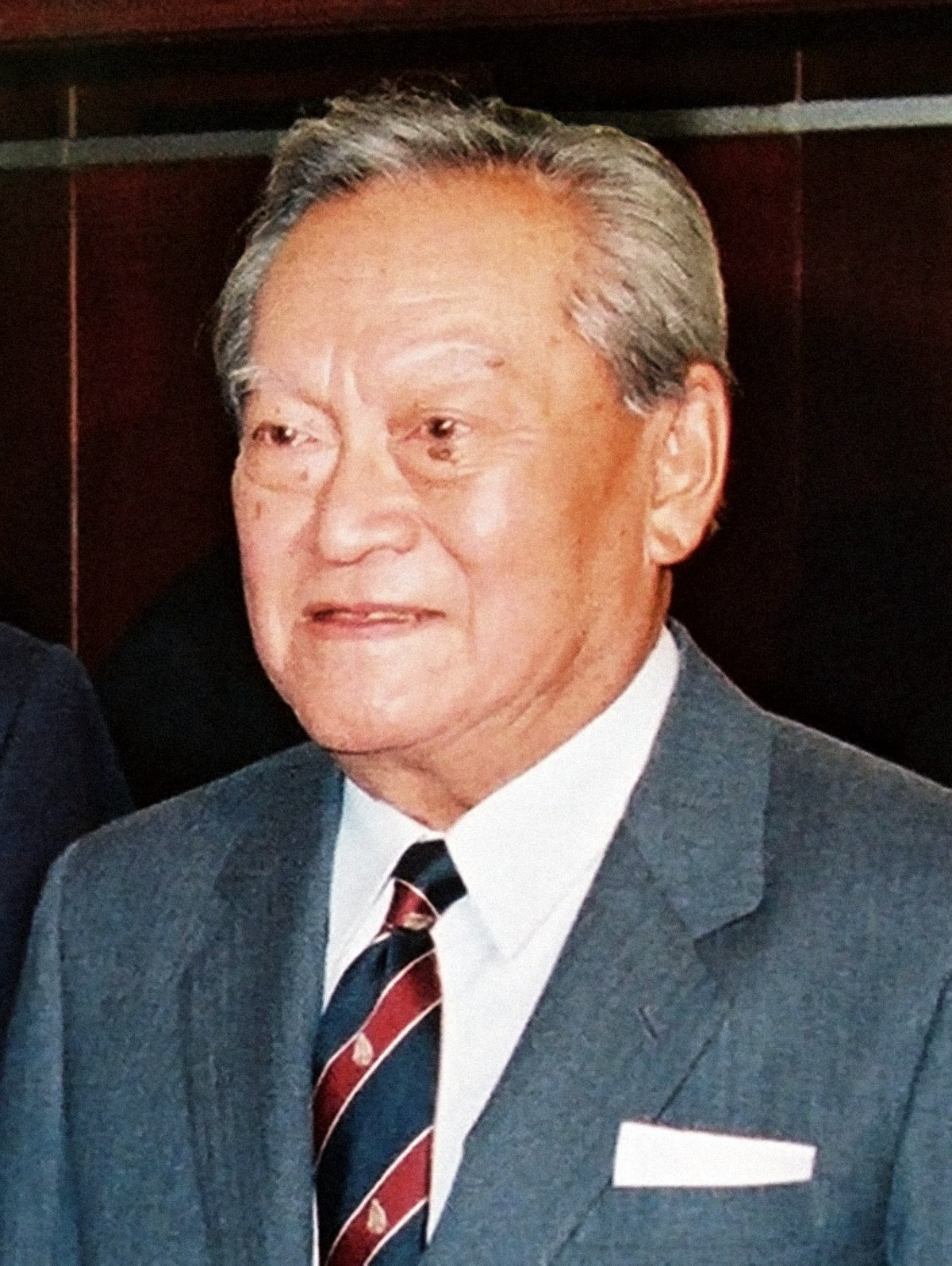
- Chatichai in 1990

17th Prime Minister of Thailand
- In office 4 August 1988 – 23 February 1991
- Monarch: Bhumibol Adulyadej
- Deputy: See list: Pong Sarasin Bhichai Rattakul Tienchai Sirisamphan Chuan Leekpai Chavalit Yongchaiyudh Pramuan Sabhavasu Sanan Kachornprasart Mana Rattanakoset Thongyod Chitaveera Arthit Kamlang-ek Booneua Prasertsuwan Chalermpan Srivikorn Kosol Krairerk
- Preceded by: Prem Tinsulanonda
- Succeeded by: Sunthorn Kongsompong (as Head of the National Peacekeeping Council); Anand Panyarachun

Deputy Prime Minister of Thailand
- In office 5 August 1986 – 3 August 1988
- Prime Minister: Prem Tinsulanonda
Ministerial offices
Minister of Industry
In office 5 October 1976 – 6 October 1976
Prime Minister	Seni Pramoj
Succeeded by	Perm Limpasawad
In office 20 April 1976 – 23 September 1976
Prime Minister	Seni Pramoj
Preceded by	Surin Thepkanjana
Minister of Foreign Affairs
In office 17 March 1975 – 21 April 1976
Prime Minister	Kukrit Pramoj
Preceded by	Bhichai Rattakul
Succeeded by	Bhichai Rattakul
Deputy Minister of Foreign Affairs
In office 15 December 1972 – 20 January 1975
Prime Minister	Thanom Kittikachorn; Sanya Dharmasakti
Preceded by	Surin Thepkanjana
Succeeded by	Lek Nana
Party political offices
Leader of the National Development Party
In office 13 July 1992 – 6 May 1998
Preceded by	Phon Rungprasitwit
Succeeded by	Arthit Kamlang-ek (acting); Korn Dabbaransi
Leader of the Thai Nation Party
In office 24 June 1986 – 15 July 1991
Preceded by	Pramarn Adireksarn
Succeeded by	Somboon Rahong

Member of the House of Representatives
- In office 13 September 1992 – 6 May 1998
- Constituency: Nakhon Ratchasima 1st District
- In office 18 April 1983 – 23 February 1991
- Constituency: Nakhon Ratchasima 1st District
- In office 26 January 1975 – 6 October 1976
- Constituency: Nakhon Ratchasima 1st District

Personal details
- Born: Sombun Choonhavan; 5 April 1920 Bangkok, Krung Thep, Siam (now Pom Prap Sattru Phai, Bangkok, Thailand)
- Died: 6 May 1998 (aged 78) London, England, United Kingdom
- Party: Thai Nation (Chart Thai) (1974–1991); National Development (1992–1998)
- Spouse: Boonruen Choonhavan
- Children: Wanee Choonhavan; Kraisak Choonhavan
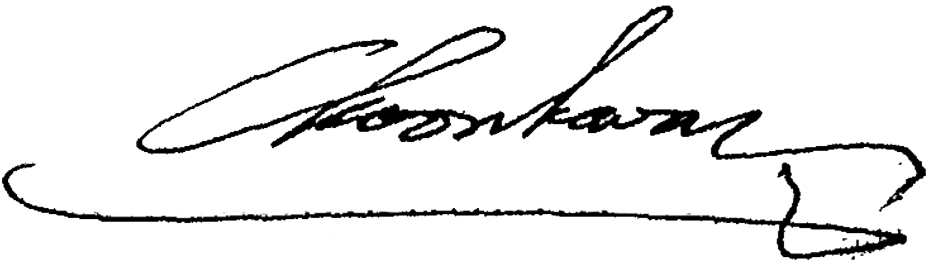
- Signature

Military service
- Allegiance: Thailand
- Branch/service: Royal Thai Army
- Years of service: 1940–1958
- Rank: General; Admiral; Air Chief Marshal
- Battles/wars: World War II; Franco-Thai War; Burma campaign; Korean War

Chatichai Choonhavan (Thai: ชาติชาย ชุณหะวัณ; RTGS: Chatchai Chunhawan, pronounced [tɕʰâːt.tɕʰāːj tɕʰūn.hà.wān]; 5 April 1920 – 6 May 1998) was a Thai army officer, diplomat and politician. From 1986 to 1991, he was the chairman of the Thai Nation Party and served as the Prime Minister of Thailand from August 1988 until the 1991 coup d'état.

== Family ==
Chatichai was the only son of Field Marshal Phin Choonhavan and Khunying Wibunlak Choonhavan. His father was the Commander-in-Chief of the Royal Thai Army from 1948 to 1954 and exerted a strong influence on the country's politics and economy. Chatichai had four sisters. The eldest was married to General Phao Siyanon, who was one of Thailand's strongmen during the 1950s. Another sister married Pramarn Adireksarn, who later became Chatichai's political ally. Chatichai married Boonruen Sopoj, a relative and confidante of Princess Mother Srinagarindra—the mother of kings Ananda Mahidol and Bhumibol Adulyadej.

Chatichai and Boonruen had two children, daughter Wanee Hongpraphas, and their son political scientist, social activist, and former senator Kraisak Choonhavan.

The former deputy prime minister Korn Dapparansi is his nephew.

== Education, military and diplomatic career ==
Chatichai studied at Debsirin School, a long-standing, prestigious, all-boys school in Bangkok, and at the Chulachomklao Royal Military Academy. He entered active military service as second lieutenant and cavalry platoon leader in 1940. During World War II, he was assigned to the Phayap Army ("Northwest Army"), under the command of his father Phin, and participated in the invasion of the Shan States of Burma. After the war, he continued his training at the Thai Army Cavalry School and the United States Army Armor School in Fort Knox, Kentucky. In 1949, he was appointed military attaché in Washington, DC. At the age of 31, Chatichai was a major-general.

In 1951, the military, led by Chatichai's father and his brother-in-law, Phao Siyanon, effectively assumed power in Thailand in a "silent coup". They used their political influence to extend their activities to the economic sphere. Chatichai served in the Korean War as the commander of the 1st Cavalry Battalion. Then, he became director and commander of the Thai Army Armor School. In 1957, Field Marshal Sarit Thanarat—a rival of Chatichai's father and brother-in-law—staged a coup d'état against the government of Prime Minister Plaek Phibunsongkhram. He ousted the Phin-Phao clique and filled the important political and military posts with his own followers. The new regime accused the Choonhavan clan (also known as the Soi Rajakru clan, after the family's residence) of having embezzled millions of dollars of public funds and hiding them in Swiss bank accounts. This ended Chatichai's military career.

Chatichai was transferred to the diplomatic service and assigned to the relatively unimportant post of ambassador to Argentina. During the following years he consecutively served as the Thai ambassador to Austria, Switzerland, Turkey, Yugoslavia, the Holy See and the United Nations. In 1972, he returned to Bangkok to become the director of the Foreign Ministry's political department.

== Early political career ==
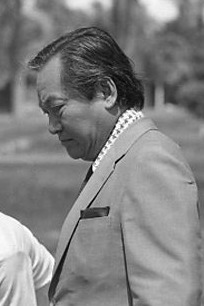
Chatichai in 1974

In the government of Field Marshal Thanom Kittikachorn, Chatichai was appointed deputy minister of foreign affairs in 1972. During the hostage-taking in the Israeli embassy by a terrorist commando of the Palestinian Black September organisation in December 1972, he and the Agriculture Minister Dawee Chullasapya negotiated with the terrorists. In exchange for the release of the Israeli diplomats, they lent themselves as guarantees and accompanied the terrorists on their freedom flight to Cairo. Chatichai continued as deputy foreign minister after the 1973 democratic uprising, serving in the interim cabinet of Sanya Dharmasakti. In December 1973, one and a half years before Thailand officially established diplomatic relations with the People's Republic of China, Chatichai and Dawee—who was then minister of defence—were the first Thai government officials to visit Beijing. There, they negotiated a contract for the supply of 50,000 tons of diesel oil at a "friendship price" and promised to remove trade barriers between the two nations.

In 1974, Chatichai and his in-laws Pramarn Adireksarn and Siri Siriyothin—also major generals—founded the conservative and aggressively anti-communist Thai Nation Party (Chart Thai). It ran in the January 1975 general election, the first democratic election after the end of military dictatorship, and became the third-strongest party. Chatichai was elected member of parliament, representing a constituency in Nakhon Ratchasima Province. The Thai Nation Party joined a government coalition under Kukrit Pramoj. Chatichai served as minister of foreign affairs from 17 March 1975 to 21 April 1976. After the snap election in April 1976, in which the Thai Nation Party expanded its share of seats significantly, he was minister of industry in the government of Seni Pramoj until it was overthrown by a military coup d'état after the Thammasat University massacre of 6 October 1976. From 1980 to 1983, Chatichai served as industry minister under Prime Minister Prem Tinsulanonda. After three years of opposition, the party returned to government and Chatichai was deputy prime minister under Prem.

== Prime Minister of Thailand (1988–1991) ==
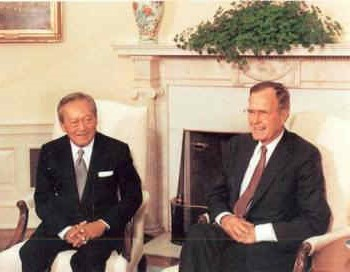
President George Bush and Prime Minister Chatichai Choonhavan at the White House in 1990

The Thai Nation Party won the most votes in the 1988 Thai general election, resulting in Chatichai being appointed prime minister on 4 August 1988. This made him the first democratically elected head of government after 12 years of dictatorship and "semi-democracy". His government improved relations with communist-ruled Vietnam, Cambodia, and Laos, which had been Thailand's enemies during the Cold War. It promoted international trade with these countries and others. Chatichai's slogan was to turn Indochina "from a battlefield into a marketplace". It also supported the Sihanouk-led Government of Cambodia. Chatichai's government initiated many infrastructure projects, including an expansion of the telecommunications network in partnership with the state-owned Telephone Organization of Thailand (TOT), development of the Eastern seaboard of Thailand, and road and rail networks in partnership with the Mass Rapid Transit Authority (MRTA) in the Greater Bangkok Area. During Chatichai's premiership, Thailand's economy saw annual growth rates of up to 13 percent.

Under Chatichai's government, there was rampant corruption. The parties and politicians in Chatichai's coalition scrambled overtly over the distribution of public funds. The Thai press dubbed them the "buffet cabinet", referring to their "take-what-you-like" mentality. Chatichai's standard answer whenever he was confronted by the press with difficulties or corruption allegations against members of his government was "no problem". A parody variant, "no plomplam", became the title of a popular song by folk rock singer Aed Carabao and entered Thai common parlance. Chatichai was heavily criticised when he tried to downplay the damage caused by Typhoon Gay, which resulted in 360 deaths, in the same way.

The formerly right-wing Thai Nation Party had de-ideologized itself and now represented the interests of the rising class of provincial businessmen. It pursued policies that boosted their businesses and involved them in lucrative government contracts. It advocated a reinforcement of the role of parliament, in which politicians from the provinces were strongly represented, in contrast with the unelected power elites in the administration and military which had made political decisions during the tenure of Chatichai's predecessor, Prem Tinsulanonda. Chatichai's government emphasised the economic development of the periphery at the expense of Bangkok's big businesses and military expenditures, which it tried to cut. These policies challenged the country's traditional elites.

=== 1991 coup d'etat ===
On 23 February 1991, the Commander-in-Chief of the Royal Thai Army, General Sunthorn Kongsompong, and the generals of the Chulalongkorn Military Academy class 5, Suchinda Kraprayoon, Issarapong Noonpakdi, and Kaset Rojananil, formed the National Peace Keeping Council to depose Chatichai's government in a coup d'état. They accused the elected government of massive corruption and abuse of power for its own advantage. They charged several cabinet members, including Chatichai, with "unusual wealth". At the same time, they acted in the interest of the traditional elite of the bureaucracy, military and Bangkokian business circles, whose influence the Chatichai government had sought to curtail. The coup group called the form of governance under Chatichai "parliamentary dictatorship" and alleged a moral decline.

== Post-premiership ==
Following his ouster, Chatichai temporarily went into exile in the United Kingdom. After his return, he continued his political activity. After the 1992 Black May, he founded the National Development Party and was again elected in his constituency in Nakhon Ratchasima.

== Personal life ==
Chatichai was known for his fondness of cigars, fine wines, and Harley-Davidson motorcycles. Even in old age, he practised several sports and visited parties and discothèques, earning him a reputation of being a playboy.

== Death ==
On 6 May 1998, at the age of 78, Chatichai died from liver cancer in a hospital in London.

== Honours ==
received the following royal decorations in the Honours System of Thailand:

- Knight Grand Cross of the Order of Chula Chom Klao
- Knight Grand Cordon of the Most Exalted Order of the White Elephant
- Knight Grand Cordon of the Most Noble Order of the Crown of Thailand
- Order of Symbolic Propitiousness Ramkeerati
- Bravery Medal
- Victory Medal – Franco-Thai War
- Victory Medal – Pacific War
- Victory Medal – Korean War
- Freemen Safeguarding Medal (First Class)
- Safeguarding the Constitution Medal
- Chakra Mala Medal
- King Rama IX Royal Cypher Medal,1st class

=== Foreign honours ===
- UN :
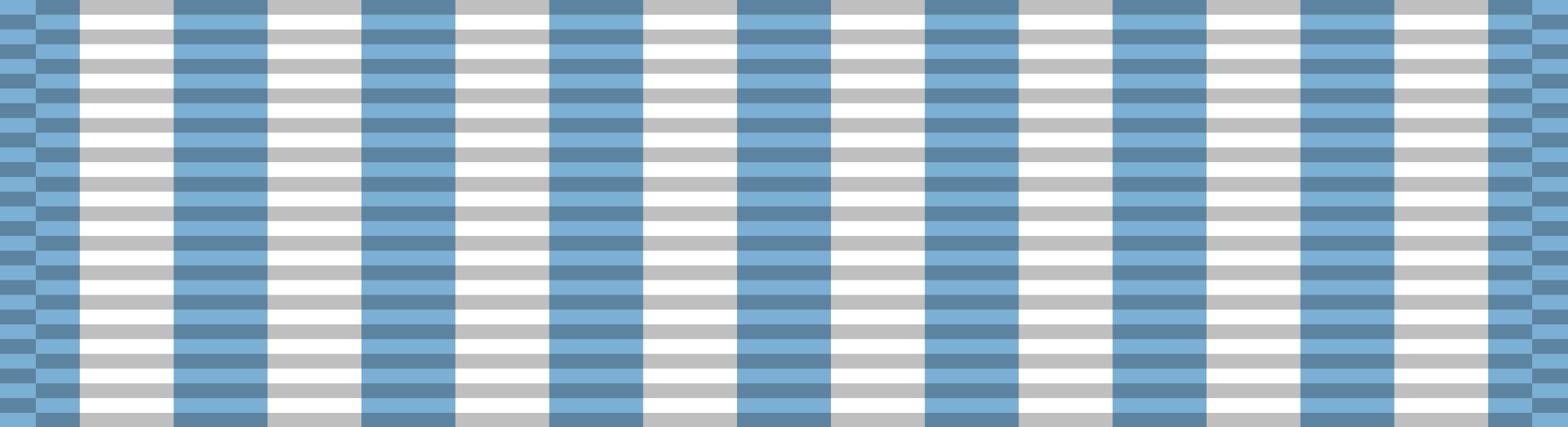
  - United Nations Korea Medal (1952)
- Japan :
  - Grand Cordon of the Order of the Rising Sun (1987)
  - Order of the Sacred Treasure, Third Class (1955)
- Taiwan :
  - Order of the Yunhui, Fourth Class (1957)
- Myanmar :
  - Commander of the Order of the Union of Burma - Civilian Member (1958)
- Austria :
  - Grand Decoration of Honour in Gold of the Decoration of Honour for Services to the Republic of Austria with Sash (1964)
- Argentina :
  - Grand Cross of the Order of the Liberator General San Martín (1969)
- Philippines :
  - Grand Collar of the Order of Sikatuna (1971)
- Malaysia :
  - Honorary Grand Commander of the Order of Loyalty to the Crown of Malaysia (1973)
- West Germany :
  - Grand Cross 1st Class of the Order of Merit of the Federal Republic of Germany (1984)
- Belgium :
  - Grand Cordon of the Order of Leopold (1988)
- Sweden :
  - Commander Grand Cross of the Royal Order of the Polar Star (1989)
- South Korea :
  - Order of Diplomatic Service Merit, Grand Gwanghwa Medal (1990)

=== Military rank ===
- General, Admiral and Air Chief Marshal

=== Volunteer Defense Corps of Thailand rank ===
- Volunteer Defense Corps General

Political offices
Preceded by Prem Tinsulanonda	Prime Minister of Thailand; 1988–1991	Succeeded by Anand Panyarachun
