= Kaset Rojananil =

Thai air force officer (1933–2024)

- เกษตร โรจนนิล
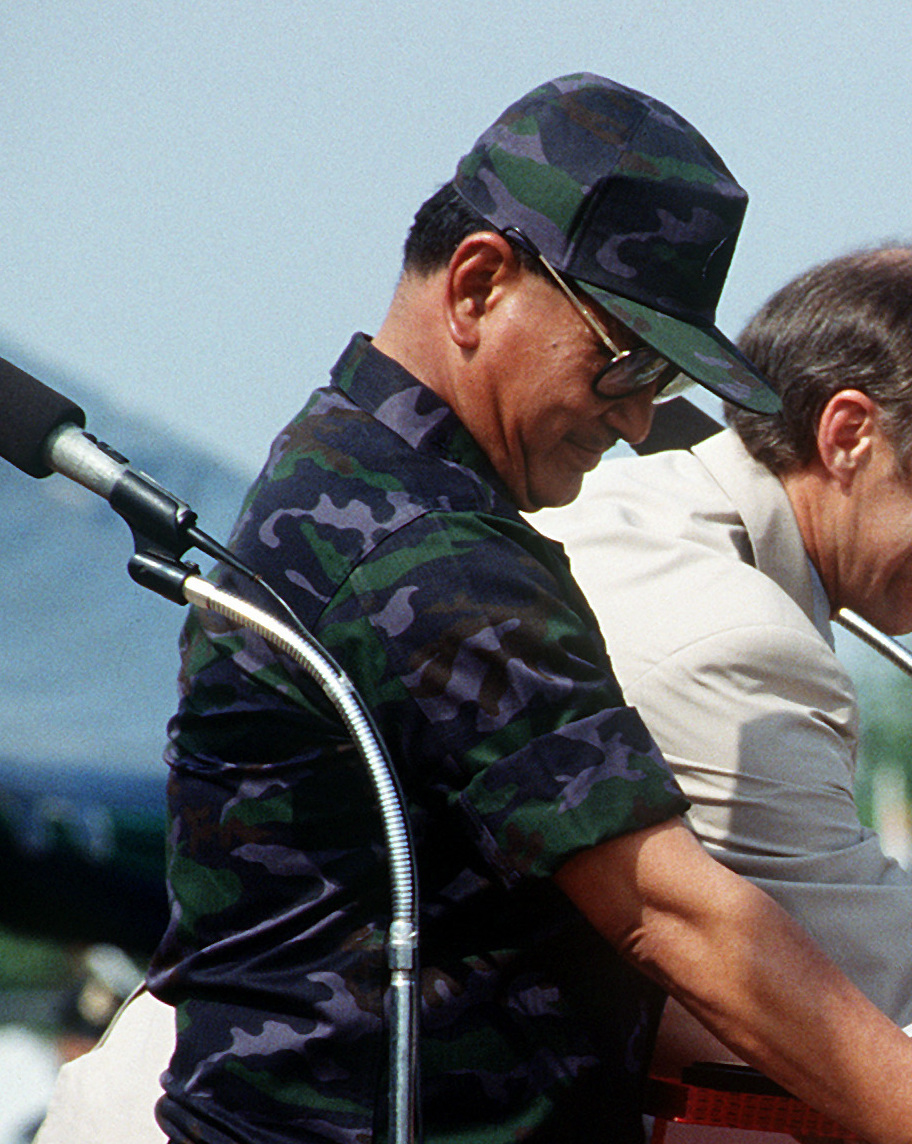
- Rojananil at the opening of Cobra Gold 1992
- Born: 27 August 1933; Thailand
- Died: 3 April 2024 (aged 90); Bangkok, Thailand
- Military career
- Allegiance: Thailand
- Branch: Royal Thai Air Force
- Rank: Air Chief Marshal
- Commands: Commander-in-Chief
- Other work: Head of Thai Airways International, Founder of the Justice Unity Party

Air Chief Marshal Kaset Rojananil (Thai: เกษตร โรจนนิล, RTGS: Kaset Rochananin; 27 August 1933 – 3 April 2024) was a Thai air force officer. He was the Commander of the Royal Thai Air Force from 1989 to 1992 and briefly held Thailand's most senior military post, the Supreme Commander of the Royal Thai Armed Forces from April to July 1992.

Kaset was an alumnus of the 5th Class of the Chulachomklao Royal Military Academy, and one of the leaders of the National Peace Keeping Council's 1991 coup against the government of Chatichai Choonhavan. After the coup he became head of Thai Airways International, and co-founded the pro-military Justice Unity Party. He was later demoted to general inspector of the Ministry of Defense.

As head of Thai Airways International, he famously noted that "we have received a lot of complaints that our air hostesses are not pretty enough—too old and unsmiling. And we must improve on that". He added that the airline had been hiring too many college-educated women and that "intelligent women tend to not be good looking." He noted that he had ordered airline recruiters to screen flight attendant applications "in the way beauty-pageant judging panels select contestants."

Rojananil died on 3 April 2024, at the age of 90.

== Honours ==
- 1988 – Knight Grand Cordon of the Most Exalted Order of the White Elephant
- 1987 – Knight Grand Cordon of the Most Noble Order of the Crown of Thailand
- 1992 – Knight Grand Commander of the Most Illustrious Order of Chula Chom Klao
- 1962 – Victory Medal - Korean War
- 1968 – Victory Medal - Vietnam War, with flames
- 1990 – Freeman Safeguarding Medal, 1st Class
- 1968 – Chakra Mala Medal
- 1990 – Boy Scout Citation Medal of Vajira, First Class
- 1991 – King Rama IX Royal Cypher Medal, 3rd Class

=== Foreign honours ===
- South Vietnam :
  - Armed Forces Honor Medal, First Class (1964)
  - Vietnam Campaign Medal (1964)
- USA :
  - Commander of the Legion of Merit (1990)
- Indonesia :
  - Bintang Swa Bhuwana Paksa, Utama Class (1991)
- Japan :
  - Grand Cordon of the Order of the Sacred Treasure (1993)
- South Korea :
  - Order of National Security Merit, Tongil Medal
