= Sombun Wanchaithanawong =

Thai politician (1936–2026)

- สมบูรณ์ วันไชยธนวงศ์

Member of the House of Representatives of Thailand
- In office 24 July 1988 – 10 May 2011

Personal details
- Born: 1 October 1936 Mueang Phetchaburi district, Thailand
- Died: 11 July 2026 (aged 89) Thoeng district, Thailand
- Party: Solidarity (1987–1990); Justice Unity (1991–1992); National Development (1992–1995); Thai Nation (1995–1996); New Aspiration (1996–2002); Thai Rak Thai (2002–2007); PPP (2007–2008); Pheu Thai (2008–2011, 2018–2022); Bhumjaithai (2011–2018, 2022–2026)
- Education: Sukhothai Thammathirat Open University (BA)
- Occupation: Civil servant

Sombun Wanchaithanawong (Thai: สมบูรณ์ วันไชยธนวงศ์; 1 October 1936 – 11 July 2026) was a Thai politician. A member of multiple political parties throughout his career, he served in the House of Representatives from 1988 to 2011.

Wanchaithanawong died in Thoeng district on 11 July 2026, at the age of 89.
