= 1995 Thai general election =

- 2 July 1995

All 391 seats in the House of Representatives 196 seats needed for a majority
- Registered: 37,817,983
- Turnout: 62.04% (▲0.45pp)
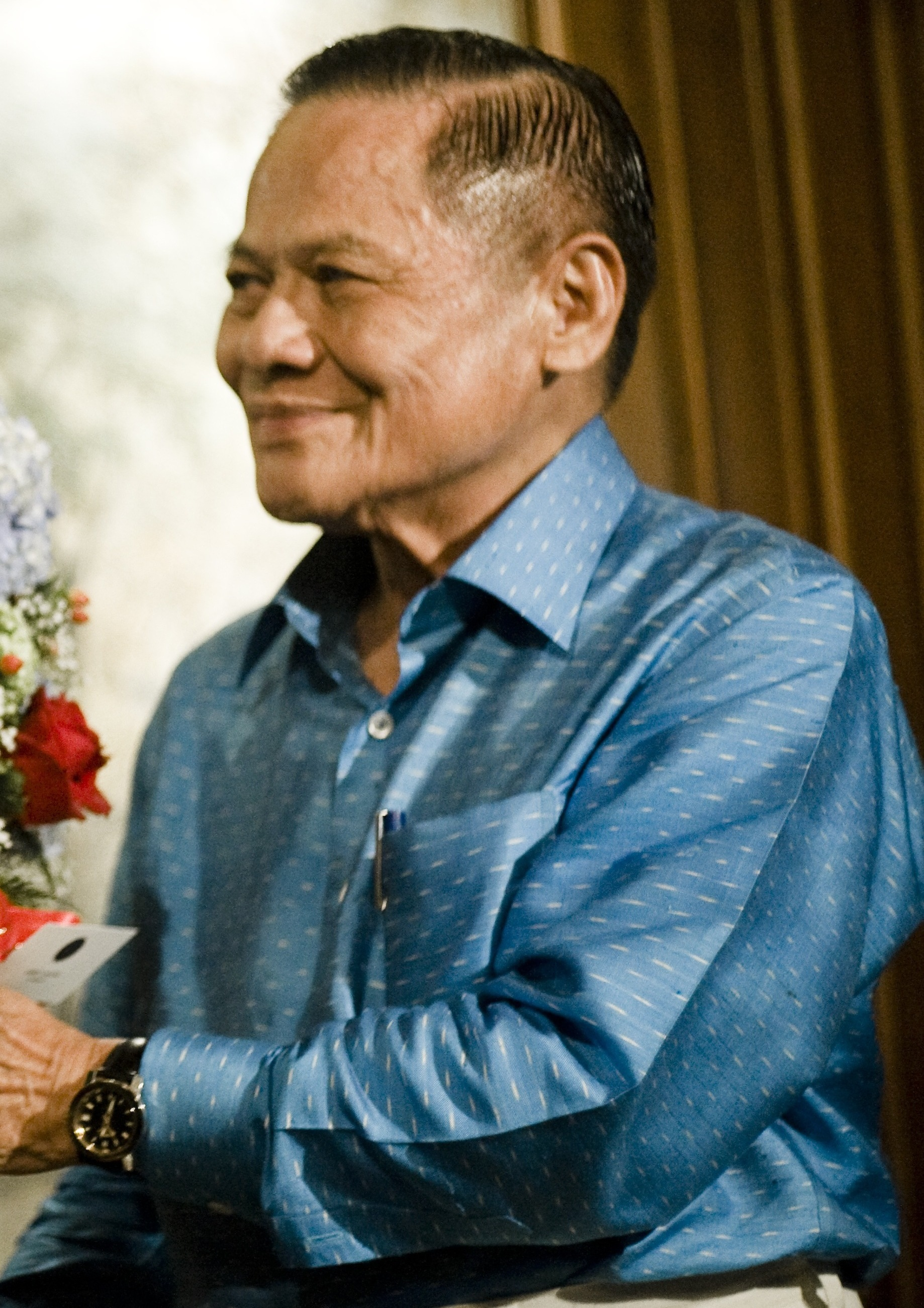

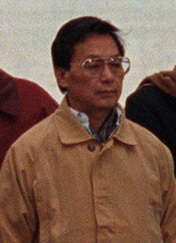

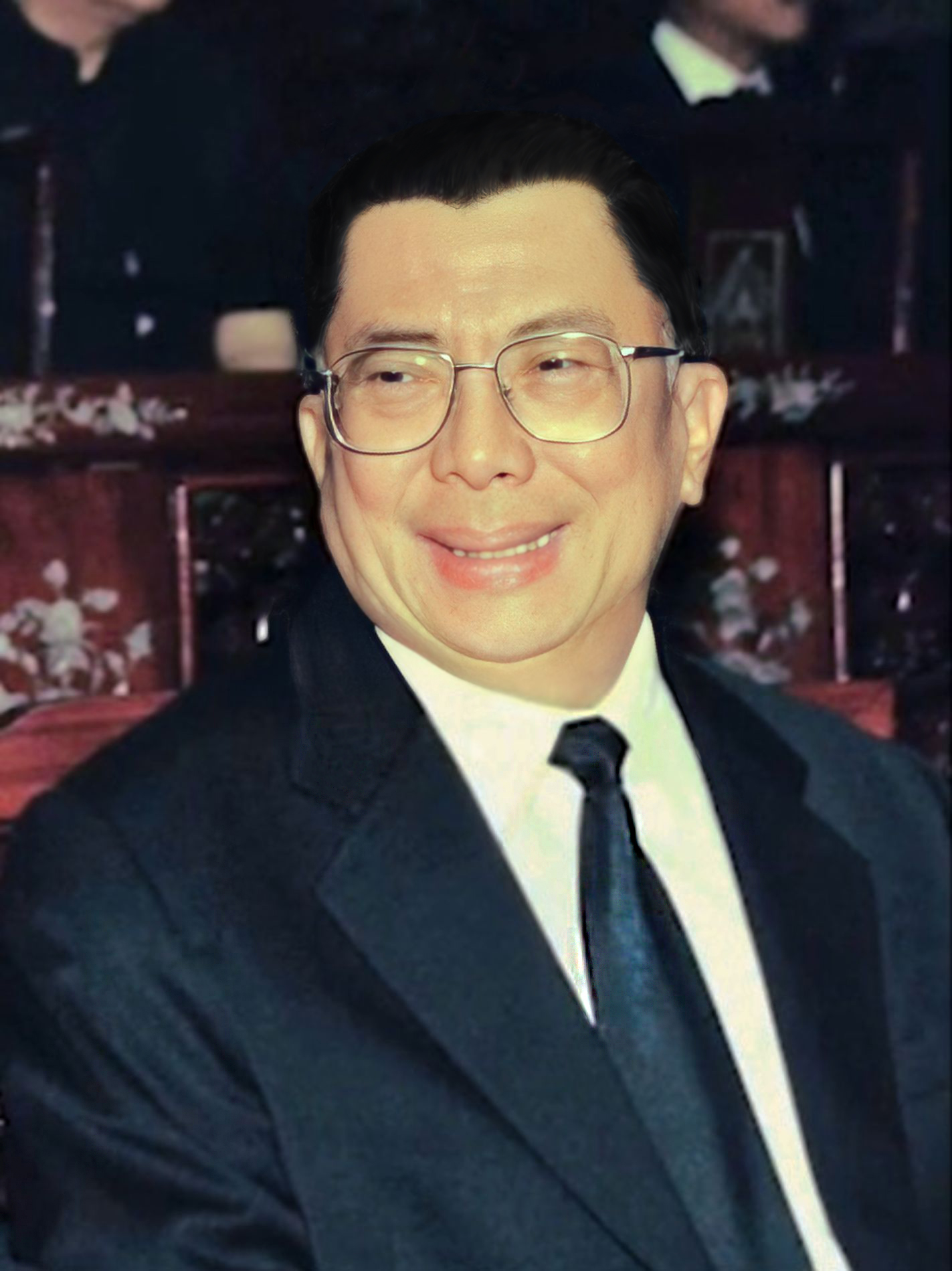

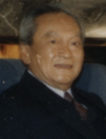

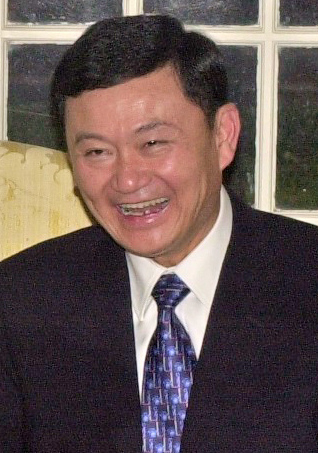

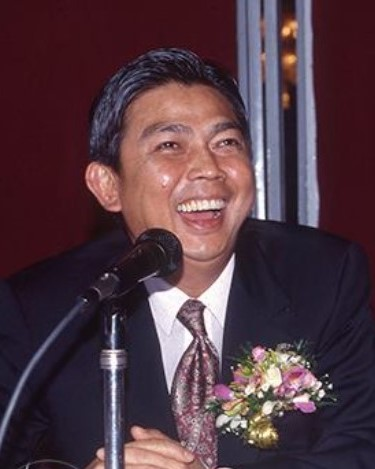

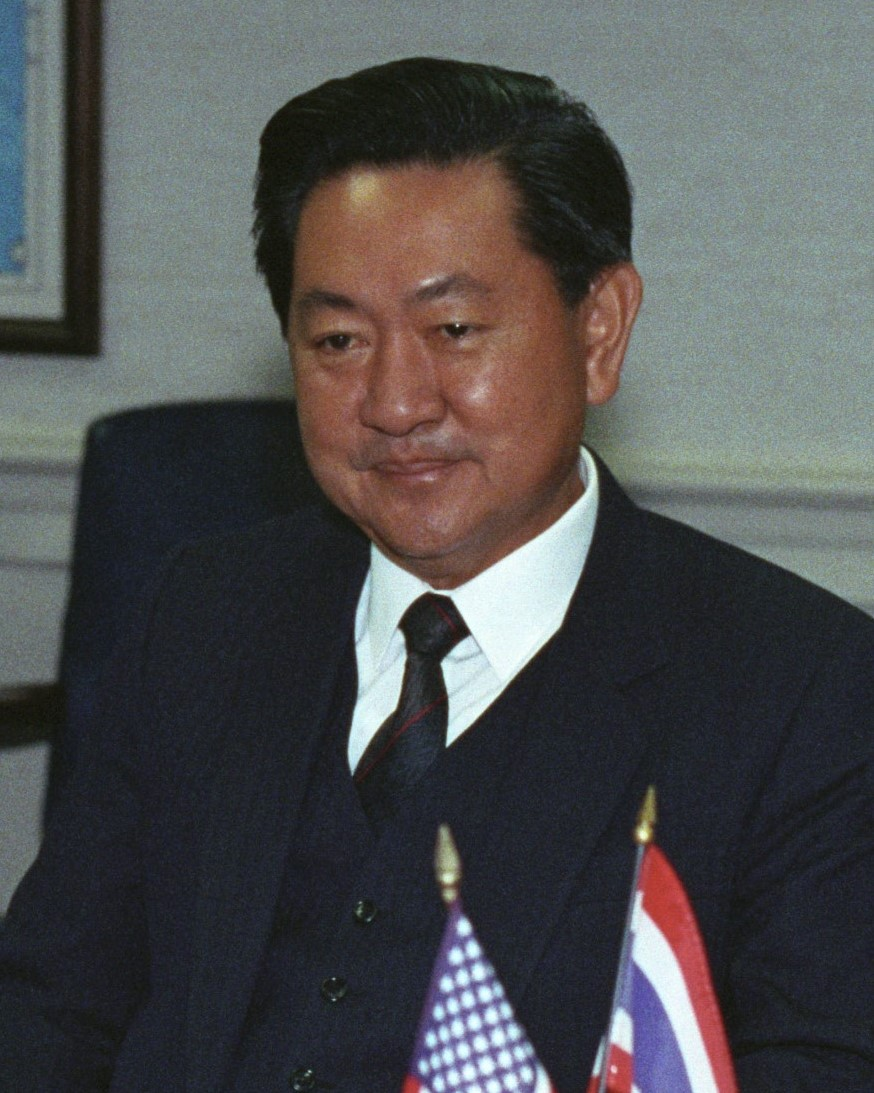
	First party	Second party	Third party
Leader	Banharn Silpa-archa	Chuan Leekpai	Chavalit Yongchaiyudh
Party	Chart Thai	Democrat	New Aspiration
Last election	15.76%, 77 seats	21.02%, 79 seats	14.24%, 51 seats
Seats won	92	86	57
Seat change	▲15	▲7	▲6
Popular vote	12,630,074	12,325,423	6,806,621
Percentage	22.83%	22.28%	12.30%
Swing	▲7.07pp	▲1.26pp	▼1.96 pp
	Fourth party	Fifth party	Sixth party
Leader	Chatichai Choonhavan	Thaksin Shinawatra	Montri Pongpanich
Party	National Development	Palang Dharma	Social Action
Last election	15.88%, 60 seats	17.96%, 47 seats	4.04%, 22 seats
Seats won	53	23	22
Seat change	▼7	▼24	Steady
Popular vote	6,612,512	4,209,135	2,201,218
Percentage	11.95%	7.61%	3.98%
Swing	▼3.93pp	▼10.35pp	▼0.06pp
	Seventh party
Leader	Amnuay Virawan
Party	Leading Thai
Seats won	18
Popular vote	3,474,142
Percentage	6.28%
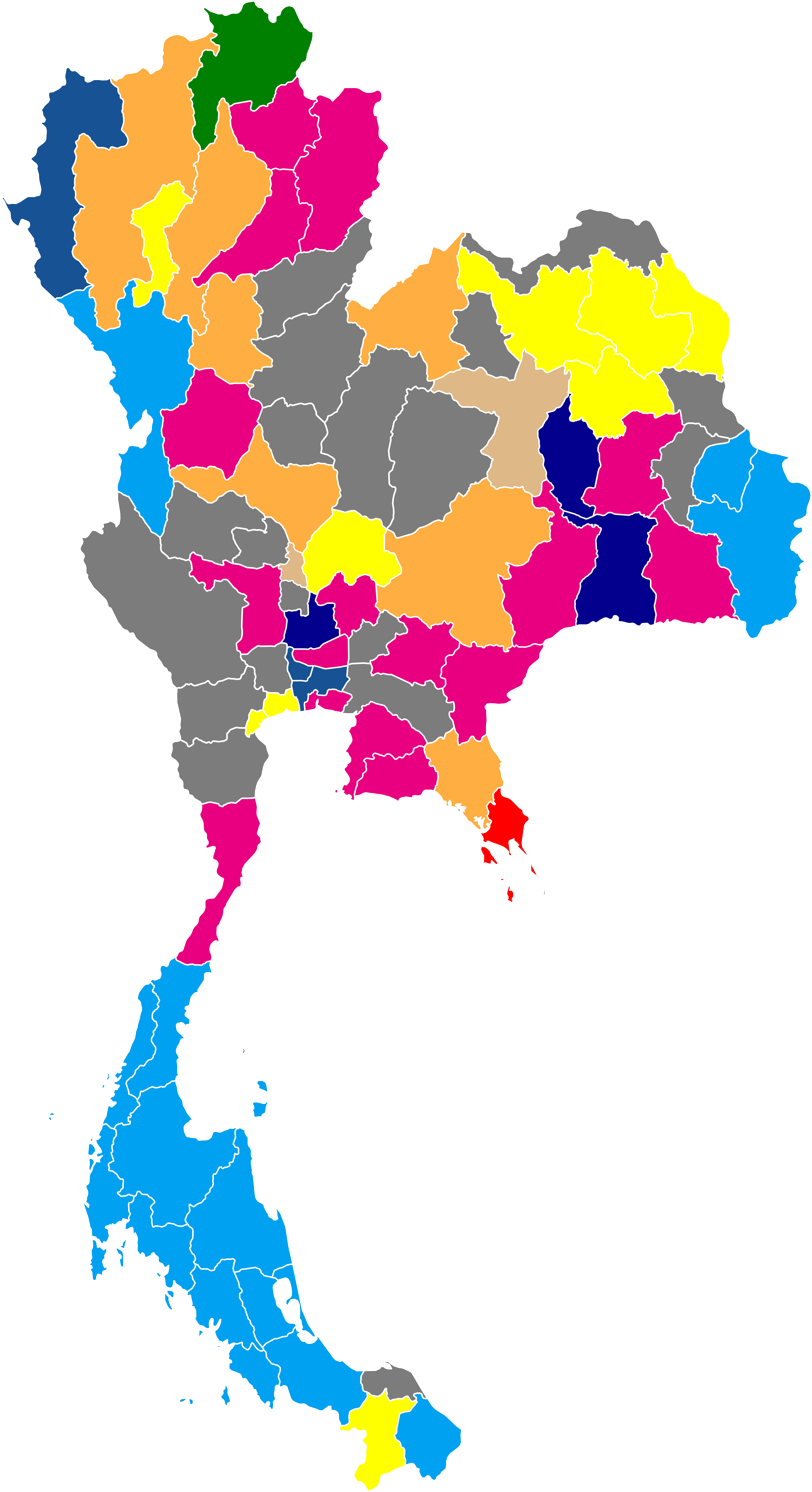
- Majority of seats won by parties by province Chart Thai Democrat New Aspiration National Development; Palang Dharma Social Action Leading Thai Solidarity Seritham No majority
Prime Minister before election
Chuan Leekpai
Democrat
Elected Prime Minister
Banharn Silpa-archa
Chart Thai

General elections were held in Thailand on 2 July 1995. The Thai Nation Party emerged as the largest party, winning 92 of the 391 seats. Voter turnout was 62%. The prevalence of vote buying in this election was considered one of the highest to date.

== Results ==
Party	Votes	%	Seats	+/–
Thai Nation Party	12,630,074	22.83	92	+15
Democrat Party	12,325,423	22.28	86	+7
New Aspiration Party	6,806,621	12.30	57	+6
National Development Party	6,612,504	11.95	53	–7
Palang Dharma Party	4,209,135	7.61	23	–24
Leading Thai Party	3,474,142	6.28	18	New
Thai Citizen Party	2,476,218	4.48	18	+15
Social Action Party	2,201,218	3.98	22	0
Seritham Party	1,716,786	3.10	11	+3
Solidarity Party	1,361,719	2.46	8	0
Mass Party	1,309,381	2.37	3	–1
Safeguard Thai Party	195,835	0.35	0	New
Total	55,319,056	100.00	391	+31
Valid votes	22,784,030	97.11		
Invalid/blank votes	678,716	2.89		
Total votes	23,462,746	100.00		
Registered voters/turnout	37,817,983	62.04		
Source: Nohlen et al.
