= March 1992 Thai general election =

- 22 March 1992

All 360 seats in the House of Representatives 181 seats needed for a majority
- Registered: 32,436,283
- Turnout: 59.24% (▼4.32pp)
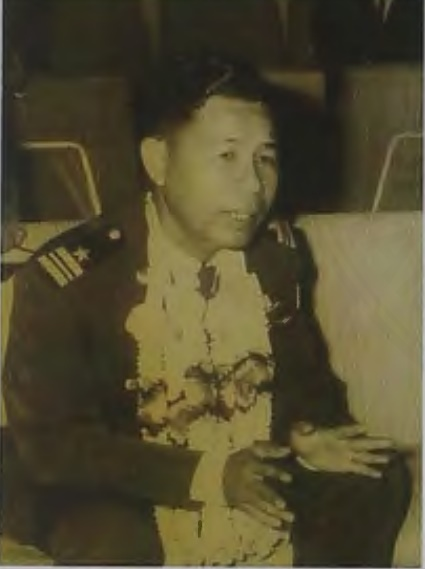

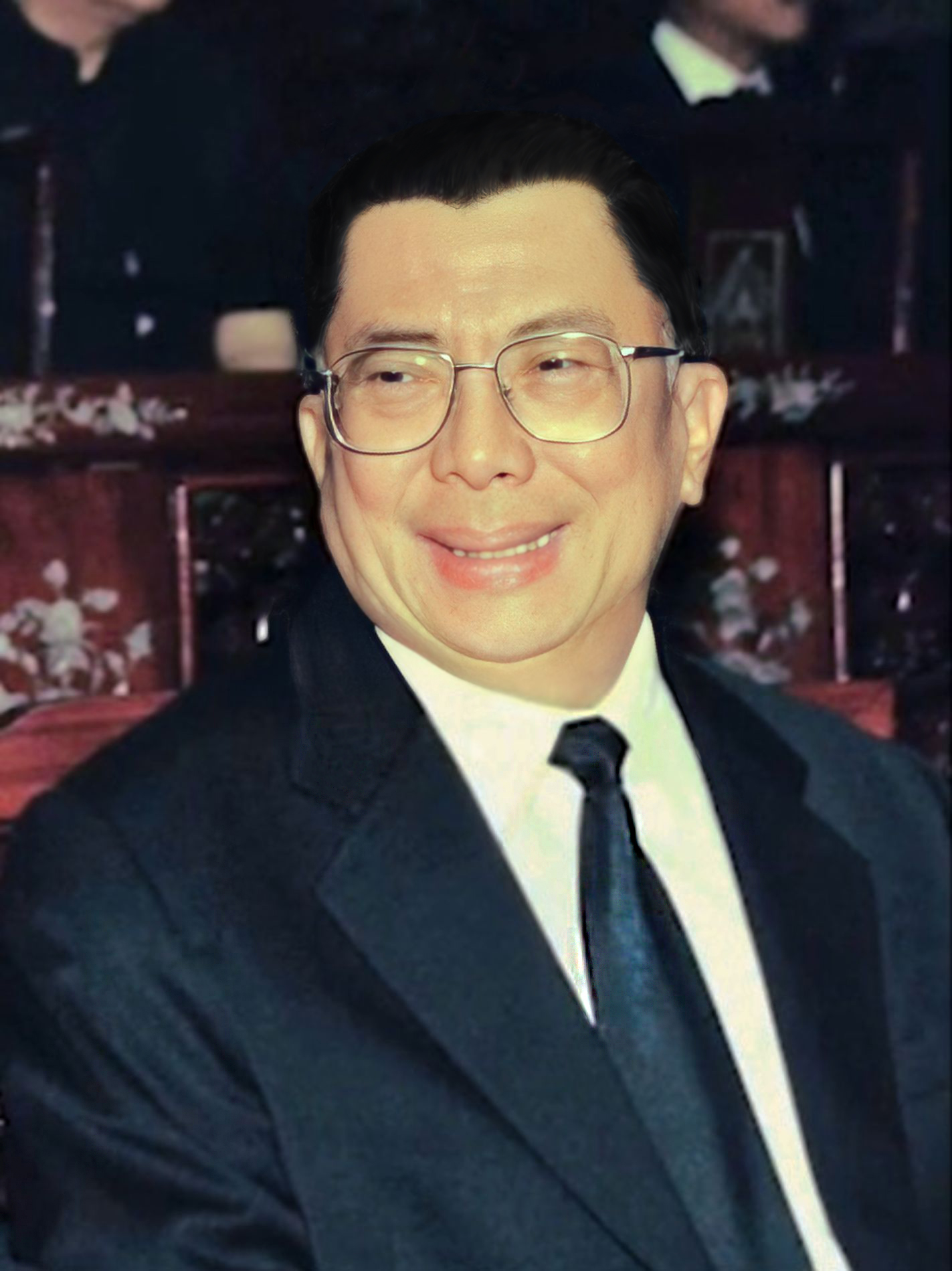

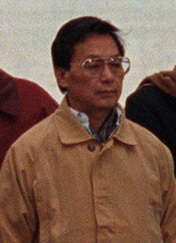

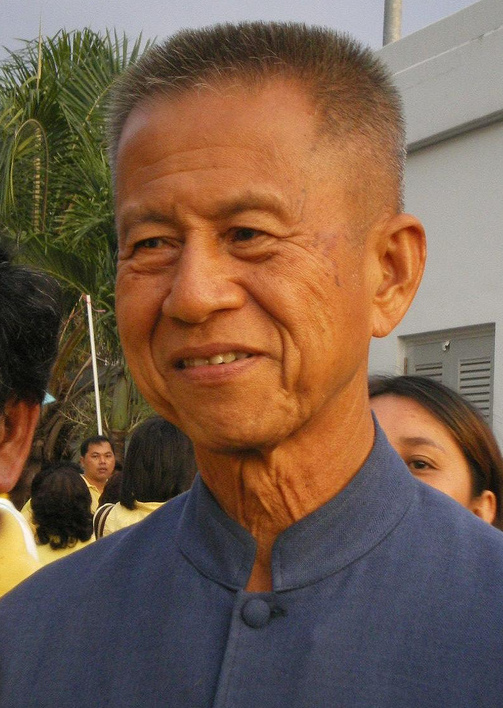

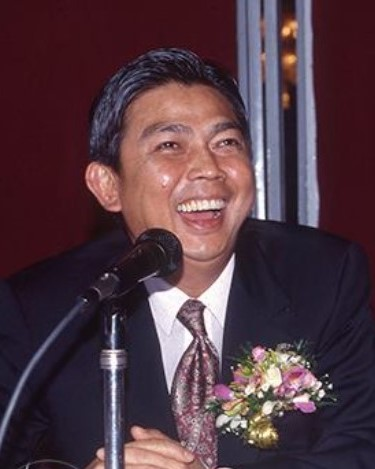

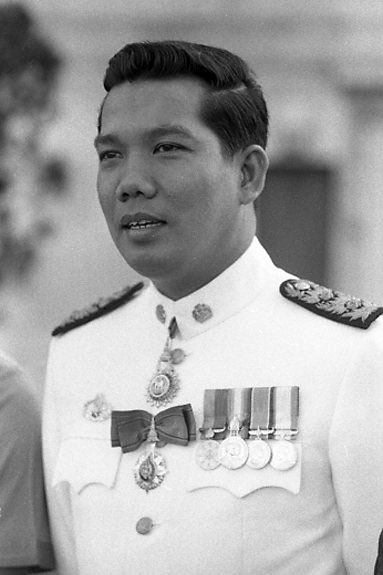
	First party	Second party	Third party
	JUP
Leader	Narong Wongwan	Somboon Rahong	Chavalit Yongchaiyudh
Party	Justice Unity	Chart Thai	New Aspiration
Last election	–	19.29%, 87 seats	–
Seats won	79	74	72
Seat change	New	▼13	New
Popular vote	8,578,529	7,305,674	9,980,150
Percentage	19.27%	16.41%	22.42%
Swing	New	▼2.88pp	New
	Fourth party	Fifth party	Sixth party
Leader	Chuan Leekpai	Chamlong Srimuang	Montri Pongpanich
Party	Democrat	Palang Dharma	Social Action
Last election	11.29%, 48 seats	9.09%, 14 seats	11.79%, 54 seats
Seats won	44	41	31
Seat change	▼4	▲27	▼23
Popular vote	4,705,376	5,104,849	3,586,714
Percentage	10.57%	11.47%	8.06%
Swing	▼0.72pp	▲2.38pp	▼3.73pp
	Seventh party
Leader	Samak Sundaravej
Party	Thai Citizen
Last election	6.12%, 31 seats
Seats won	7
Seat change	▼24
Popular vote	2,280,887
Percentage	5.12%
Swing	▼1.00pp
Prime Minister before election
Anand Panyarachun
Independent
Elected Prime Minister
Suchinda Kraprayoon
Independent

General elections were held in Thailand on 22 March 1992, the first after the National Peace Keeping Council overthrew the elected government of Chatichai Choonhavan in a coup on 23 February 1991. A total of 15 parties and 2,185 candidates contested the 360 seats. The Justice Unity Party emerged as the largest party in the House of Representatives with 79 seats despite receiving fewer votes than the New Aspiration Party. Voter turnout was 59%.

== Opinion polls ==
=== Exit polls ===
Polling organisation/client	TNP	NAP	JUP	DP	SAP	TCP	PDP	SP	MP	PP	TPP	UNF	Lead
Ministry of Interior	82	75	77	38-40	30	18	16	15	2	3			
Police	80	75	76	37	32	23	11	11	2	2		1	
SBB	70	65-66	65-66	50-60	50	20	20	1-2					
Chula	82	79	79	39	29	21	18	9	2	1	1		
Matichon	72	81	81	36	32	20	22	11	2	2	1		

== Results ==
The Palang Dharma Party was very successful, especially in the Bangkok area where it won 32 of the 35 seats, many famous politicians were not elected, such as Police Captain Chalerm Yubamrung, the Mass Party leader. (currently affiliated with the Pheu Thai Party), Marut Bunnag, Pramote Sukhum, Pichai Rattakul, Charoen Kanthawong from the Democrat Party. And it was considered the first political role of a new politician who later became an important player in politics, namely Abhisit Vejjajiva, later the former party leader and former the 27th prime minister, who was the only MP from the Democrat Party in Bangkok and Khunying Sudarat Keyuraphan from the Palang Dharma Party is now the Thai Sang Thai Party leader.

Party	Votes	%	Seats	+/–
New Aspiration Party	9,980,150	22.42	72	New
Justice Unity Party	8,578,529	19.27	79	New
Thai Nation Party	7,305,674	16.41	74	–13
Palang Dharma Party	5,104,849	11.47	41	+27
Democrat Party	4,705,376	10.57	44	–4
Social Action Party	3,586,714	8.06	31	–23
Thai Citizen Party	2,280,887	5.12	7	–24
Solidarity Party	1,315,075	2.95	6	New
Mass Party	443,568	1.00	1	–4
People Party	376,580	0.85	4	–17
United New Force	337,361	0.76	0	New
Thai People Party	158,037	0.36	1	–16
Local Progress Party	156,808	0.35	0	New
Free Agriculture Party	152,692	0.34	0	New
United Democracy Party	34,651	0.08	0	New
Total	44,516,951	100.00	360	+3
Valid votes	18,668,740	97.15		
Invalid/blank votes	547,726	2.85		
Total votes	19,216,466	100.00		
Registered voters/turnout	32,436,283	59.24		
Source: Nohlen et al.

== Aftermath ==
In the first tier, the Justice Unity Party successfully supported Dr. Arthit Ourairat, who was a MPs of the party, to become Speaker of the House of Representatives, an important position because of his position as Speaker of the National Assembly which is to lead the list of prime minister present to His Majesty and signed in response to the Royal Command appointment of the prime minister.

Both before and after this election the media went to interview General Suchinda Kraprayoon, who was the commander-in-chief of the Royal Thai Army and the Supreme Commander deputy leader of the National Peace Keeping Council many times whether to be prime minister or not which General Suchinda Has clearly refused to accept the position of prime minister. this gave Narong Wongwan, the leader of the Justice Unity Party with the highest votes, a chance to become prime minister, but it appears that the United States had refused to issue a visa to him due to suspicion that he was involved in a drug trafficking ring, in which case, Narong Wongwan has completely denied this news and that this news is deliberately fabricated to discourage himself becoming prime minister.

The Justice Unity Party won the most seats, 79 seats out of a total of 360 seats, less than half of the House of Representatives causing the formation of a coalition government with the support from 4 political parties, including 5 coalition parties, namely Justice Unity Party (79), Thai Nation Party (74), Social Action Party (31), Thai Citizen Party (7), and People Party (4), totaling 195 government MPs.

While the opposition party consists of 6 parties, namely New Aspiration Party (72), Democrat Party (44), Palang Dharma Party (41), Solidarity Party (6), Thai People's Party (1) and Mass Party (1) in total of 165 MPs for the opposition party.

Later, General Suchinda Kraprayoon, Commander-in-Chief of the Royal Thai Army and Supreme Commander was invited as prime minister instead of Narong Wongwan by royal command appointed on Monday, April 7, 1992, but announced his resignation on Saturday, May 24, 1992 after the Black May incident, holding office for only 47 days.

After the Black May incident, many parties speculated that Air Chief Marshal Somboon Rahong, leader of the Thai Nation Party which has the second most elected MPs, will become the new prime minister. Eventually, Dr. Arthit Ourairat, the Speaker of the National Assembly, nominated the previous prime minister, Anand Panyarachun, to return to the position of prime minister for a second term to prepare for a new election with a royal command appointed on Tuesday 10 June 1992.

As for the Justice Unity Party, after the new prime minister, Narong Wongwan, the party's leader resigned, causing the party's executive committee to vacate the entire board. Most of the former party executive committees have decided to resign from party membership to form a new political party or move to other political parties. The remaining ex-executive committee members, including Narong, held a general meeting to change the party's name to Liberal Party and elect a new party executive committee in July 1992, but shortly thereafter. during August all party executive committees decided to resign from party membership. Before Supreme Court an order to dissolve the party later.
