= 1992 Thai general election =

1992 Thai general election may refer to:

- March 1992 Thai general election
- September 1992 Thai general election
