= Chalerm Yubamrung =

Thai politician (born 1947)

- เฉลิม อยู่บำรุง
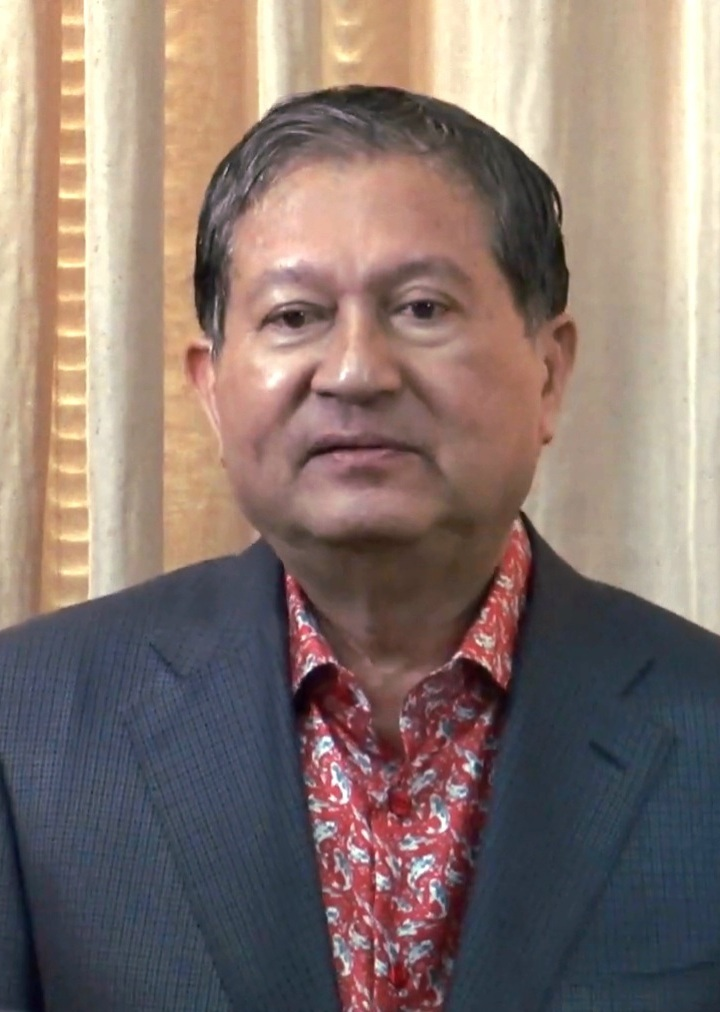

Deputy Prime Minister of Thailand
- In office 9 August 2011 – 30 June 2013
- Prime Minister: Yingluck Shinawatra

Minister of Labour
- In office 30 June 2013 – 7 May 2014
- Prime Minister: Yingluck Shinawatra
- Preceded by: Padermchai Sasomsap
- Succeeded by: Surasak Karnjanarat

Minister of Public Health
- In office 24 September 2008 – 19 December 2008
- Prime Minister: Somchai Wongsawat
- Preceded by: Chaovarat Chanweerakul
- Succeeded by: Vittaya Kaewparadai

Minister of Interior
- In office 6 February 2008 – 2 August 2008
- Prime Minister: Samak Sundaravej
- Preceded by: Surayud Chulanont
- Succeeded by: Kowit Wattana

Minister of Justice
- In office 13 July 1995 – 24 November 1996
- Prime Minister: Banharn Silpa-archa
- Preceded by: Sawai Pattano
- Succeeded by: Sutat Nguenmeuan

Minister to the Office of the Prime Minister
- In office 9 August 1988 – 22 November 1990
- Prime Minister: Chatichai Choonhavan
- Preceded by: Pol Rengprasertwit
- Succeeded by: Prasong Burapong

Personal details
- Born: June 10, 1947 (age 79) Bang Bon, Bangkok, Siam
- Party: Independent (since 2025)
- Other political affiliations: Democrat (1983–1986); Mass (1986–1993, 1995–1998, 2002–2007); Social Action (1993–1995); New Aspiration (1998–2002); People's Power (2007–2008); Pheu Thai (2008–2025); Palang Pracharath (2025)
- Spouse: Lamnao Yubamrung
- Children: Artharn, Wan Ubumrung and Duang Ubumrung
- Education: Ramkhamhaeng University (PhD)
- Profession: Politician; police officer

Military service
- Allegiance: Thailand
- Branch/service: Volunteer Defense Corps
- Rank: VDC Gen.
- Police career
- Status: Resigned
- Rank: Police Captain

Police Lieutenant Colonel Chalerm Yubamrung (Thai: ร้อยตำรวจเอก เฉลิม อยู่บำรุง, RTGS: Chaloem Yubamrung, pronounced [tɕʰà.lɤ̌ːm jùː.bām.rūŋ]; born 10 June 1947) is a Thai politician. He was a Member of Parliament representing the Pheu Thai Party, and was one of the Deputy Prime Ministers of Yingluck Shinawatra from 2011 to 2013. His past political appointments include floor leader of the Pheu Thai Party, brief terms as Health Minister under Somchai Wongsawat, Interior Minister under Samak Sundaravej, Justice Minister under Banharn Silpa-archa, and Leader of the Opposition from 2009 to 2011.

== Family life ==
Chalerm was born at Bang Bon, Bangkok. He is married to Lamnao Yubamrung (Thai: ลำเนา อยู่บำรุง), an auxiliary judge of Thailand's juvenile court. They have three sons: Artharn, Wanchalerm and Duangchalerm. In 2001 Duangchalerm was arraigned for murder of a police officer. After fleeing to Malaysia, he returned and handed himself in. He was released from jail on bail terms in 2003, and finally acquitted as the court considered the evidence insufficient and the witnesses accounts contradictory. Chalerm's younger brother, Nawarat Yubamrung (Thai: นวรัตน์ อยู่บำรุง), is a politician, serving several terms as a member of the Bangkok Metropolitan Council.

== Education ==
Chalerm graduated from the Royal Thai Police Academy. He reached the rank of police captain, before he resigned his commission to go into private business. He later received a doctor's degree in law from the open-admissions Ramkhamhaeng University.

== Political career ==
Chalerm first entered politics as an MP with the Democrat Party. In 1985 he formed his own party, the Mass Party. Its power base was in western Bangkok, especially Phasi Charoen and Bang Bon Districts. Chalerm won several consecutive MP election bids, with the exception of the first election of 1992. He served as Minister for Office of the Prime Minister under Chatichai Choonhavan, overseeing the Mass Communications Organization of Thailand. He was accused of press interference and had ongoing conflicts with the military, to the point that he was cited by the coup-makers as one of the reasons for the 1991 military coup d'état. In the wake of the coup Chalerm was among the politicians accused of "unusual wealth", and had 32 million baht in assets seized. He fled Thailand to live in Sweden and Denmark until the political situation cooled down.

After returning to Thailand, Chalerm allied his Mass Party with the Thai Nation Party, which led the opposition during the first Chuan Leekpai government. Chalerm played an important role in the 1995 debates regarding a censure motion against then-Agriculture Minister Suthep Thaugsuban for his role in the Sor Por Kor 4-01 (Thai: สปก.4-01) land reform scandal. These debates resulted in PM Chuan dissolving parliament to avoid a no-confidence vote, and ultimately in the rise of a Thai Nation Party-led government with Banharn Silpa-archa as prime minister. Chalerm was appointed justice minister in this cabinet, serving from 13 July 1995 to 24 November 1996.

In 1997, Chalerm dissolved the Mass Party to combine with the New Aspiration Party (NAP) of Prime Minister Chavalit Yongchaiyudh. When in 2002, the NAP merged into the Thai Rak Thai Party of the new prime minister Thaksin Shinawatra, Chalerm did not follow this path, but revived his Mass Party. In 2004 he ran for the office of Governor of Bangkok as an independent, finishing fourth with some 165,000 votes.

In the 2007 general election Chalerm joined the People's Power Party and was again elected MP. On 6 February 2008 he joined the Samak Sundaravej cabinet as Ministry of Interior, serving until Samak's disqualification from politics. He served in the cabinet of the short-lived Somchai Wongsawat government as Minister of Public Health. From 2009 to 2011 he was the floor leader of the Pheu Thai Party in the House of Representatives and, as Pheu Thai was the main opposition at that time, Leader of the Opposition against the government of Abhisit Vejjajiva. After Pheu Thai won the 2011 elections, Chalerm was appointed Deputy Prime Minister under Yingluck Shinawatra, on 9 August 2011. During a cabinet reshuffle in July 2013, he lost the post of deputy prime minister and was appointed minister of labour instead. Chalerm reportedly considered this change as a demotion.

On the night of 22 May 2014, military officers arrested him during the events of the 2014 Thai coup d'état.
