= House of Representatives (Thailand) =

Lower house in the National Assembly of Thailand

House of Representatives สภาผู้แทนราษฎร Sapha Phuthaen Ratsadon
- 27th House of Representatives

Type
- Type: Lower house of the National Assembly of Thailand

Leadership
- Speaker: Sophon Saram, Bhumjaithai since 16 March 2026
- First Deputy Speaker: Mallika Jiraphanwanich, Bhumjaithai since 16 March 2026
- Second Deputy Speaker: Lertsak Pattanachaikul, Pheu Thai since 16 March 2026
- Prime Minister: Anutin Charnvirakul, Bhumjaithai since 7 September 2025
- Government Chief Whip: Korrawee Prissananantakul, Bhumjaithai since 20 April 2026
- Leader of the Opposition: Natthaphong Ruengpanyawut, People's since 25 September 2024
- Opposition Chief Whip: Parit Wacharasindhu, People's since 14 May 2026

Structure
- Seats: 500
- Political groups: Government (293): Bhumjaithai (192); Pheu Thai (74); Palang Pracharath (5); Prachachat (5); Economic (3); Pheu Chart Thai (2); Thai Sang Thai (2); United Thai Nation (2); New (1); New Alternative (1); New Democracy (1); New Dimension (1); New Opportunity (1); Ruam Jai Thai (1); Thai Sub Thawee (1); People's Power (1); Supported by (57): Kla Tham (57); Opposition (149): People's (120); Democrat (21); Thai Ruam Palang (6); Thai Liberal Party (1); Thai Pakdee (1); Vacant (1)
- Length of term: Four years

Elections
- Voting system: Parallel voting: First-past-the-post voting (400 seats); Party-list proportional representation (100 seats)
- First election: 15 November 1933
- Last election: 8 February 2026
- Next election: By 25 March 2030

Meeting place
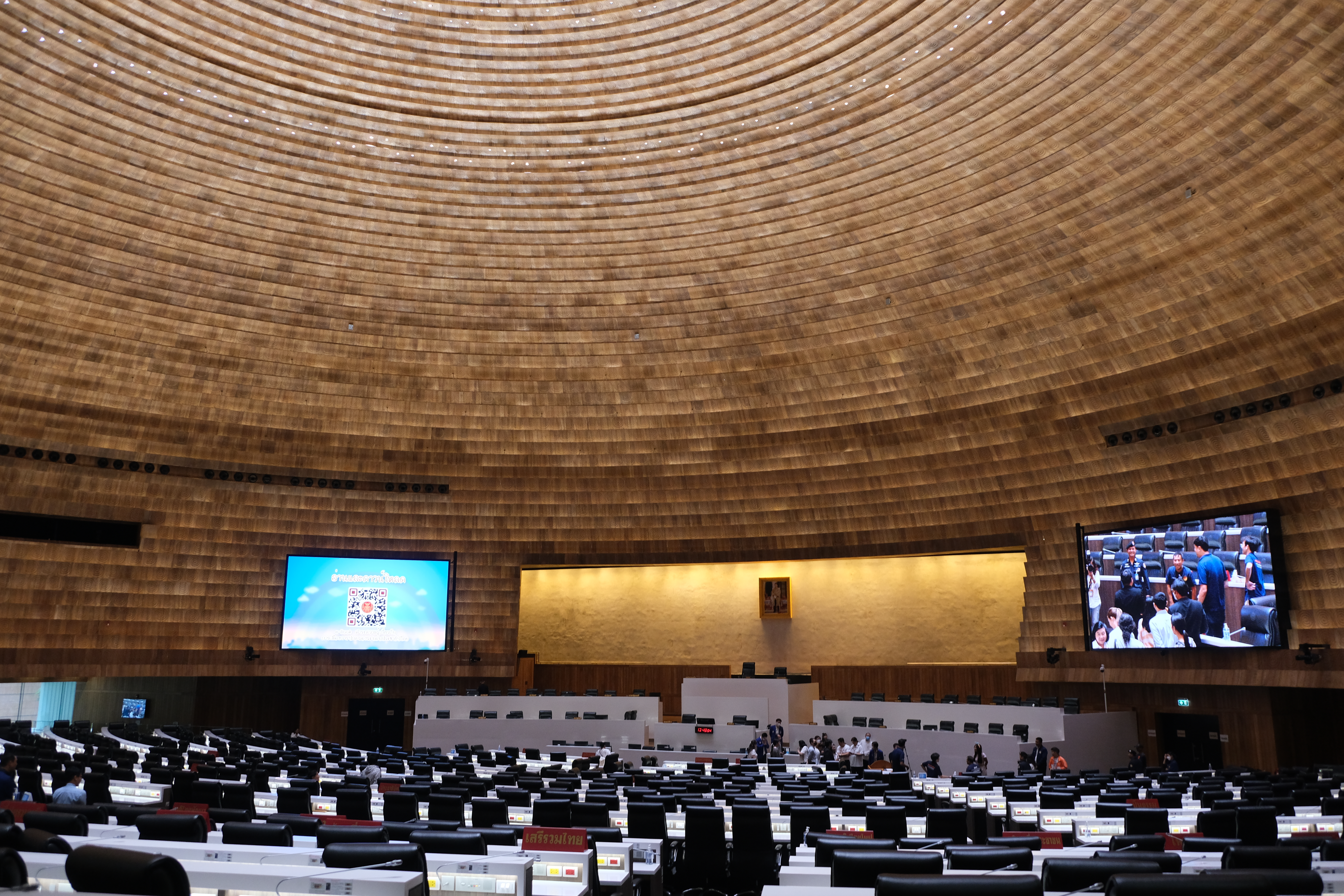
- Phra Suriyan Chamber; Sappaya-Sapasathan; Dusit District; Bangkok, Thailand

Website
- www.parliament.go.th

Rules
- Parliament Rules

The House of Representatives (Thai: สภาผู้แทนราษฎร, RTGS: Sapha Phuthaen Ratsadon, pronounced [sā.pʰāː pʰûː.tʰɛ̄ːn râːt.sā.dɔ̄ːn]) is the lower house of the National Assembly of Thailand, the legislative branch of the Thai government. The system of government of Thailand is that of a constitutional monarchy and a parliamentary democracy. The system of the Thai legislative branch is modelled after the Westminster system. The House of Representatives has 500 members, of which 400 are elected through single member constituency elections, while the other 100 are chosen through party lists parallel voting.

The House of Representatives has been abolished several times as a result of military coups, most recently as a result of the 2014 Thai coup d'état, when it was replaced with the unicameral National Legislative Assembly, a body of 250 members, selected by the National Council for Peace and Order. After the 2017 constitution was promulgated in April 2017, the House of Representatives was reestablished.

== Role ==
=== Bill consideration ===
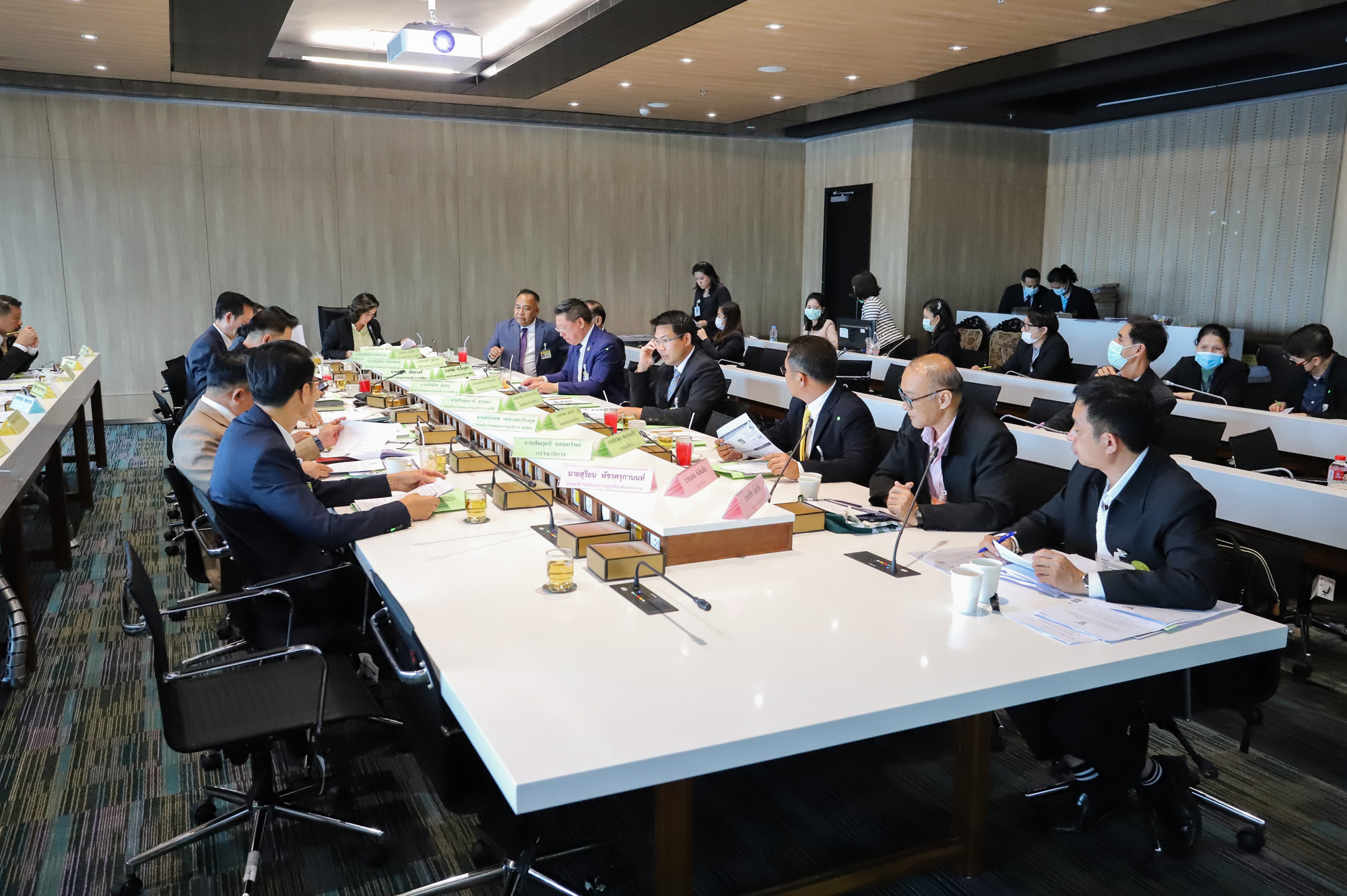
A committee room.

The Cabinet, no less than 20 members of parliament, or 10,000 eligible voters through a petition may introduce a bill. However, if it is a money bill (a bill that has provisions concerning taxes, budgetary affairs or currency), it may be introduced only with the endorsement of the Prime Minister.

Where a bill's status as a money bill may be in question, a session between the speaker and all house committee chairs may be convened to consider the status of the bill. The decision is made by a simple majority vote. If the vote is tied, the speaker must cast a tie-breaking vote.

When the process of consideration ends in the House and the bill is agreed to, the bill is sent to the senate for further deliberations; of which the process must be done within 60 days. The deadline for money bills is 30 days. If the senate is not able to deliberate within the time limit, the bill is considered to be agreed to by the senate.

If the bill is agreed to by the whole of the National Assembly, the prime minister must wait 5 days in order to give people the opportunity to challenge the bill's constitutionality. After which, the prime minister has 20 days to present the bill to the monarch for royal assent.

Any emergency act passed by the cabinet must be sent to the house for consideration without delay to be examined. If the house approves of the emergency act, it becomes an ordinary act. If not, the emergency act ceases to have effect after the decision has been published in the government gazette for one day.

=== Budget consideration ===
The 2017 Thai Constitution stipulates that the budget must be written in the form of an act, and in the introduction of a budget bill the government must show sources of income and estimates of further income, standards and measures of outcome and relevance to the 20 Year National Strategy and other national development plans. The budget must also adhere to guidelines outlined in the State Fiscal and Financial Disciplines Act.

The process of considering the budget is almost the same as considering a bill, although the deliberation deadline is extended to 105 days, and the senate is not able to amend the budget and must vote on it within 20 days.

=== Scrutiny of the government ===
==== Questioning a minister ====
A member of parliament may submit a question to a minister both in writing and orally. Questions to a minister may be asked without the question being submitted in advance. A minister may refuse to answer the question if the answer would risk national security or if they consider it not to be in the national interest.

Ministers assigning civil servants or other people to answer in their place is commonplace practice rather than the exception.

==== Motion of no confidence ====
No less than one fifth of all the members of parliament may introduce a motion to debate about a vote of no confidence in individual ministers or the entire cabinet. A simple majority is required for the motion to pass, and subsequently for the minister or the entire cabinet to cease.

=== Creation of committees ===
Committees may be set up by the house to carry out affairs or investigate matters, or to study matters and report to the house according to a set time frame. A minister may be held accountable to the committee, and it is within their duty to aid the committee in the course of an investigation or to find facts by ordering civil servants within their ministry for them to testify in the committee or to comply with information requests.

=== Considering prime ministerial candidates ===
Prior to a general election, each political party may put forward up to three candidates for prime minister. Only those candidates nominated by political parties winning 5 percent of the seats (25), and endorsed by at least 10 percent of elected members (50), may be considered for election as prime minister.

A candidate must win an absolute majority (251 votes) to be elected prime minister. Until 2024, the transitional Senate participated in the election of the prime minister. After the 2023 election, this mechanism was used to block the election of Pita Limjaroenrat, despite him enjoying majority support in the House.

== History ==
The House of Representatives was established after the Revolution of 1932, when the Khana Ratsadon (the "People's Party"), overthrew the absolute monarchy and replaced it with a system of constitutional monarchy. When King Prajadhipok signed the temporary constitution of 1932, he established the first legislative assembly in Thailand, It was an entirely royally-appointed chamber. The first session of the People's Assembly was held on 28 June 1932 in the Ananta Samakhom Throne Hall. From then on, the House has existed in various forms:

See more at: Constitutions of Thailand

- 1932 – Established – Overthrow of absolute monarchy and establishment of a fully appointed unicameral House of Representatives.
- 1933 – Reformed – The 1933 election established a partially elected unicameral House of Representatives with 156 members.
- 1946 – Reformed – The 1946 constitution established a fully elected bicameral House of Representatives with 192 members. (Result of the 1946 election was nullified and voided in 1947)
- 1947 – Reformed – The 1947 coup established a partially elected bicameral National Assembly with 186 members.
- 1949 – On 5 June 1949, Orapin Chaiyakan became the first woman to be elected to hold a post in the National Assembly of Thailand (specifically, the House of Representatives).
- 1952 – Reformed – Establishment of a partially elected unicameral House of Representatives with 246 members.
- 1958 – Abolished – The House of Representatives was abolished by Sarit Thanarat.
- 1969 – Re-established – Establishment of a fully elected unicameral House of Representatives with 219 members.
- 1971 – Abolished – The House of Representatives was abolished by Thanom Kittikachorn.
- 1975 – Re-established – Establishment of a fully elected unicameral House of Representatives with 269 members.
- 1979 – Reformed – Return of a partially elected bicameral National Assembly with 301 members.
- 1991 – Reformed – Return of a unelected unicameral National Legislative Assembly.
- 1992 – Reformed – Return of a partially elected bicameral National Assembly with 360 members.
- 2001 – Reformed – Establishment of a 500-member House with 400 members elected through single constituency elections and 100 elected through party-list proportional representation. Thus, returning to a fully elected bicameral National Assembly with 700 members.
- 2006 – Abolished – Following the 2006 coup, an interim charter was signed, establishing a 250-member National Legislative Assembly. Thus, returning to an unelected unicameral assembly.
- 2007 – Re-established – Return of a 500-member House with 375 members elected through single constituency elections and 125 appointed through party-list proportional representation, established by referendum under the 2007 Constitution of Thailand. Thus, returning to a partially elected bicameral National Assembly with the senate being partially appointed.
- 2014 – Abolished – Following the 2014 coup, an interim charter was signed, establishing a 250-member National Legislative Assembly. Thus, returning to an unelected unicameral assembly.
- 2019 – Re-established – Return of a 500-member House with 400 members elected through single constituency elections and 100 elected through party-list proportional representation, established by referendum under the 2017 constitution of Thailand. Thus, returning to a partially elected bicameral National Assembly with the senate being appointed. Since the term of the transitional senate expired on 10 May 2024, the senate has been elected by a self-selecting electorate, returning to a fully elected National Assembly with 700 members.

== Qualification ==
The qualifications to be a candidate for the House of Representatives were outlined in Chapter VII, Part II, Section 97 of the 2017 Constitution. A candidate must be a citizen of Thailand by birth only, and twenty-five years of age or older on election day. Candidates for constituency seats must have some connection to the province in which they intended to stand as a candidate. This may include: being a voter and therefore on the electoral register of the province for at least five years directly before the election, being born in the province, attending an educational institution in the province for not less than five academic years, or having a house or having been in public service in the province for five years. Politically, a candidate must be a member of one political party for a period of at least ninety days before election day, except in cases of early dissolution, in which case thirty days is the minimum period. This is done to discourage party switching before the election. There are no independent candidates.

Those specifically barred from being candidates were those: addicted to drugs, declared bankrupt, unable to vote (see voter eligibility below), former convicted felons (the individual must wait for five years after release to become eligible), removed from public service for being corrupt or incompetent, had assets confiscated due to embezzlement and finally, had assets in any newspaper or mass media business, and the individual must not be a member of the government or civil service, Senate, local administrations, member of the judiciary or other independent agencies.

== Elections ==
The House of Representatives has 500 members. 400 members are directly elected in single constituency elections by first-past-the-post voting. The 400 constituencies are divided by population according to the census and tambons. The other 100 members are elected based on party-list proportional representation. In Thai general elections, voters have two votes: one to select the member of parliament for their constituency and the second to choose which party they prefer. Seats are assigned to parties according to the d'Hondt method.

In accordance with the 2017 Constitution of Thailand, a general election is held every 4 years. The King with the advice of the prime minister is able to dissolve the House of Representatives at any time through a royal decree. Elections are held under universal suffrage; every voter must be a citizen of Thailand, if not by birth then by being a citizen for 5 years. The voter must be at least 18 years old on the day of the election. Those barred from voting in House elections include members of the clergy, those suspended from the privilege for various reasons, detainees under legal or court orders and being of unsound mind or of mental infirmity.

== Term and dissolution ==
The term of the House of Representatives is exactly four years from the previous election day. Upon the expiration of the House, the Monarch issues a decree calling for a general election to the House, in which the date of the election is to be announced. This has to be done within forty-five days of the expiration. The date of the election is the same for the entire Kingdom.

The Monarch holds the royal prerogative to dissolve the House before its expiration. The same rules apply to early dissolutions as to regular dissolutions, except that the time-frame for the election is between 45 and 60 days of the dissolution. Because the royal prerogative is exercised on the advice of the Prime Minister, in practice the prime minister holds the power to call an election at any time. Acting prime ministers do not have the power to call an early election, see Lascelles Principles.

== Membership ==
Members of the House of Representatives are generally called Members of Parliament or MPs (Thai: สมาชิกสภาผู้แทนราษฎร or ส.ส.). The membership of the House of Representatives commences on election day. If there is a vacancy in the membership of the House, and it is not due to expiration or dissolution, it must be filled. Vacancies occur due to death, resignation, conviction and/or expulsion (only by a parliamentary party through a 3/4 majority vote). If the vacancy is of a constituency member then a by-election must be held within forty days of the vacancy, unless the vacancy occurs less than 180 days before the expiry of the term of the House.

If the vacancy occurs in a party-list seat, the vacancy is filled by the Speaker of the House of Representatives by submitting the name of the next candidate in the party list (submitted on election day) to be published in the Royal Gazette. This must be done within seven days. If no name was found then the vacancy remains unfilled. Members of the House who have filled a vacancy under either of these procedures can only remain in the House for the remainder of its present term.

== Leadership ==
=== Presiding officers ===
The executive committee of House of Representatives consists of one speaker and two deputy speakers to be its presiding officers. The Speaker of the House is also the ex officio President of the National Assembly of Thailand. The election is done by a secret ballot in the first session; after a resolution is passed; the elected would be formally approved by the King. The Speaker and Deputy Speakers of the House cannot be members of the cabinet or any political party executive committee. The speaker and his or her deputies are not entitled to represent partisan interests and must exercise their powers on a non-partisan basis.

=== Leader of the Governing Coalition ===
The current Constitution does not require that the Prime Minister and the Ministers be members of the House of Representatives, although previous constitutions did require this. After the first session, the House must vote in a resolution to elect a Prime Minister, after which the King formally approves him or her. The Prime Minister-elect is not necessarily the leader of the largest party in the House. However, the electoral system usually results in a hung parliament.

The prime minister is limited to eight years in office, not counting terms in a caretaker capacity. This is equal to two full terms of the House.

=== Leader of the Opposition ===
After the appointment of the Cabinet, the King appoints the official Leader of the Opposition of Thailand. The Leader of the Opposition is the leader of the largest party with no members holding ministerial positions. The Royal appointment is countersigned by the President of the National Assembly. The Leader of the Opposition leads the Shadow Cabinet of Thailand.

== Historical composition ==
Royal appointees Independents Seri Manangkhasila Party Democrat Party Sahaphum Party United Thai People's Party Social Justice Party Thai Nation Party/Chart Thai Pattana Party Social Action Party Social Agrarian Party Social Nationalist Party Socialist Party of Thailand Seritham Party People's Nation Party Thai Citizen Party / National Democrat Party Siam Democrat Party National Development Party People Party Solidarity Party Palang Dharma Party New Aspiration Party Justice Unity Party Thai Rak Thai Party/People's Power Party/Pheu Thai Party Bhumjaithai Party Palang Pracharath Party Future Forward Party/Move Forward Party/People's Party United Thai Nation Party Kla Tham Party Other parties
1932 constitution
| 1933 | 78 / 78 |
| 1937 | 91 / 91 |
| 1938 | 91 / 91 |
| 1946 | 96 / 96 |
1947 constitution
| 1948 | 99 / 87 |
1952 constitution
| 1952 | 123 / 123 |
| Feb 1957 | 30 / 86 / 44 / 8 / 123 |
| Dec 1957 | 39 / 4 / 44 / 16 / 59 / 121 |
1968 constitution
| 1969 | 57 / 75 / 15 / 72 |
1974 constitution
| 1975 | 19 / 15 / 16 / 45 / 28 / 18 / 72 / 56 |
| 1976 | 9 / 2 / 8 / 28 / 56 / 45 / 114 / 17 |
1978 constitution
| 1979 | 3 / 20 / 32 / 13 / 38 / 82 / 33 / 80 |
| 1983 | 36 / 15 / 18 / 73 / 4 / 92 / 56 / 30 |
| 1986 | 24 / 38 / 18 / 19 / 63 / 1 / 51 / 100 / 33 |
| 1988 | 31 / 6 / 21 / 34 / 14 / 87 / 17 / 54 / 48 / 45 |
1991 constitution
| Mar 1992 | 7 / 4 / 6 / 41 / 72 / 79 / 74 / 1 / 31 / 44 / 1 |
| Sep 1992 | 3 / 1 / 8 / 47 / 51 / 77 / 60 / 22 / 79 / 12 |
| 1995 | 18 / 8 / 23 / 57 / 92 / 53 / 22 / 86 / 32 |
| 1996 | 18 / 8 / 1 / 125 / 39 / 52 / 20 / 123 / 7 |
1997 constitution
| 2001 | 248 / 36 / 41 / 29 / 1 / 128 / 17 |
| 2005 | 377 / 25 / 96 / 2 |
| 2006 | 461 / 39 |
2007 constitution
| 2007 | 233 / 37 / 165 / 45 |
| 2011 | 265 / 19 / 34 / 159 / 23 |
| 2014 | Opposition boycott, results never counted |
2017 constitution
| 2019 | 81 / 136 / 10 / 51 / 53 / 116 / 53 |
| 2023 | 151 / 141 / 10 / 71 / 25 / 40 / 36 / 22 |
| 2026 | 120 / 58 / 21 / 74 / 192 / 35 |

== See also ==
- Constitutions of Thailand
- 2007 Constitution of Thailand
- National Assembly of Thailand
