= September 1992 Thai general election =

- 13 September 1992

All 360 seats in the House of Representatives 181 seats needed for a majority
- Registered: 31,860,156
- Turnout: 61.59% (▲2.35pp)
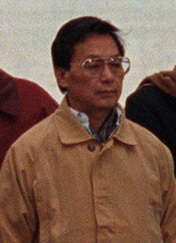

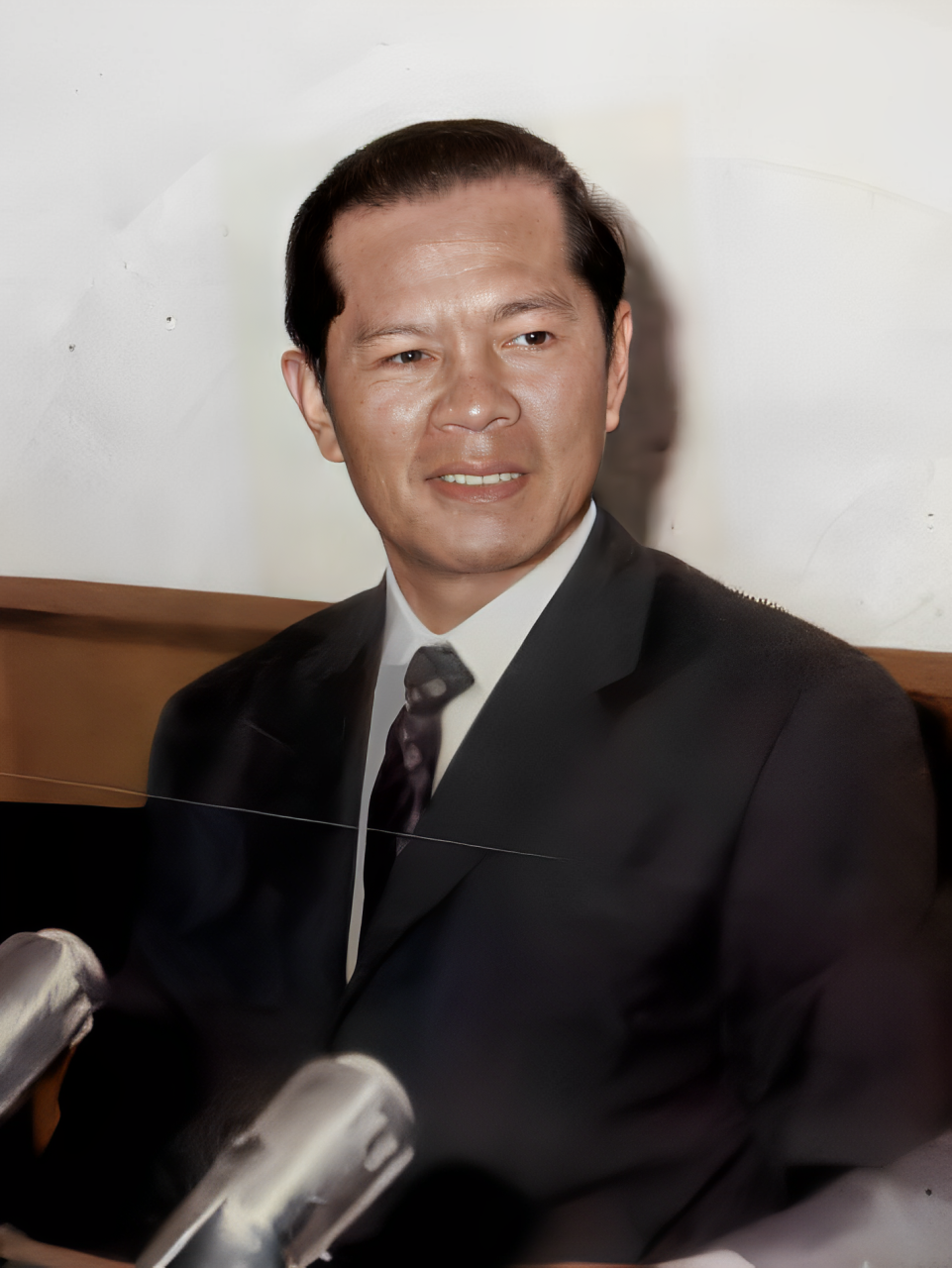

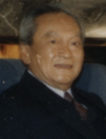

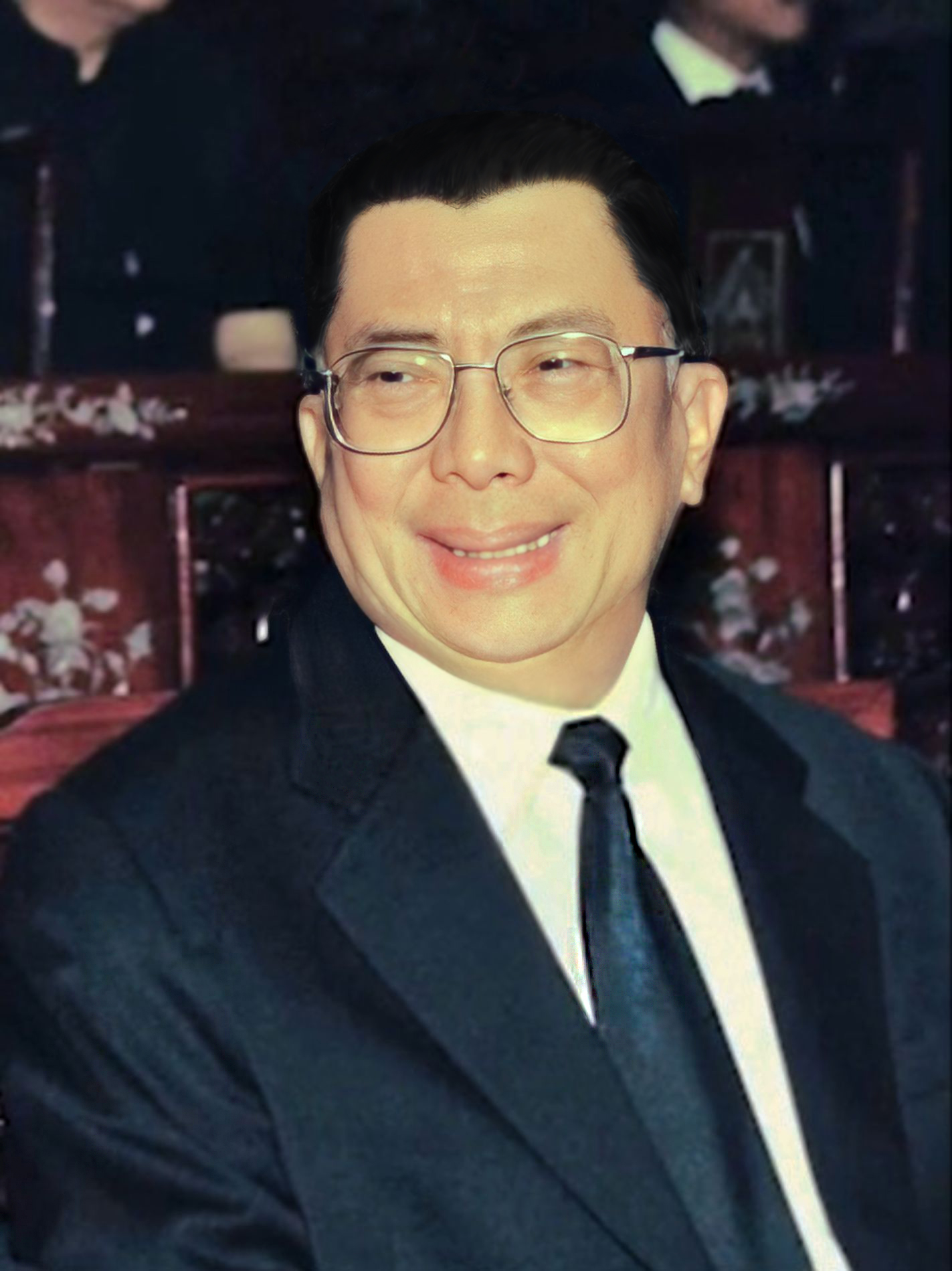

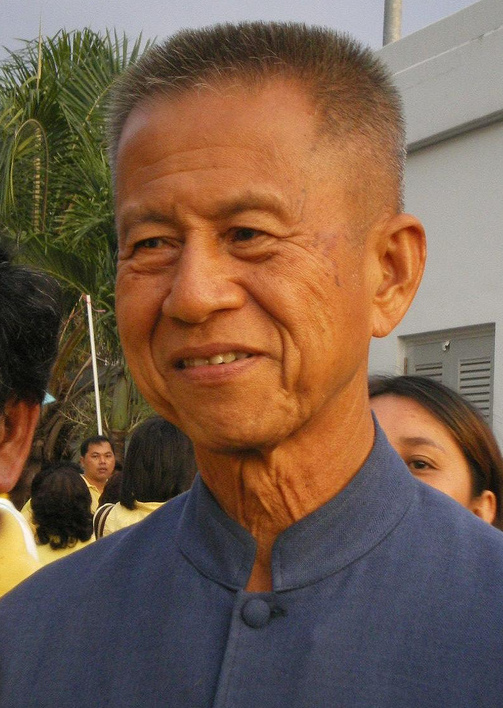

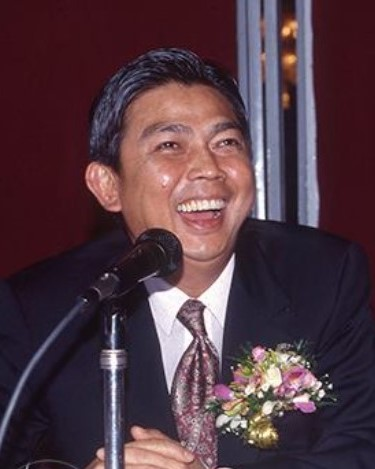
| | First party | Second party | Third party |
|---|---|---|---|
| Leader | Chuan Leekpai | Pramarn Adireksarn | Chatichai Choonhavan |
| Party | Democrat | Chart Thai | National Development |
| Last election | 10.6%, 44 seats | 16.4%, 74 seats | – |
| Seats won | 79 | 77 | 60 |
| Seat change | ▲35 | ▲3 | New |
| Popular vote | 9,703,672 | 7,274,474 | 7,332,388 |
| Percentage | 21.0% | 15.8% | 15.9% |
| Swing | ▲10.4 pp | ▼0.8 pp | New |
| | Fourth party | Fifth party | Sixth party |
| Leader | Chavalit Yongchaiyudh | Chamlong Srimuang | Montri Pongpanich |
| Party | New Aspiration | Palang Dharma | Social Action |
| Last election | 22.4%, 72 seats | 11.5%, 41 seats | 8.1%, 31 seats |
| Seats won | 51 | 47 | 22 |
| Seat change | ▼21 | ▲6 | ▼9 |
| Popular vote | 6,576,092 | 8,293,457 | 1,863,360 |
| Percentage | 14.2% | 18.0% | 4.0% |
| Swing | ▼8.2 pp | ▲6.5 pp | ▼4.0 pp |
Prime Minister before election
Anand Panyarachun
Independent
Elected Prime Minister
Chuan Leekpai
Democrat

General elections were held in Thailand on 13 September 1992. They were the first elections after Black May and the end of the military dictatorship by the National Peace Keeping Council. Voter turnout was 62%.

The Democrat Party emerged as the largest in parliament, winning 79 of the 360 seats. The Democrat Party subsequently formed a coalition government with the New Aspiration Party, the Palang Dharma Party, the Solidarity Party and the Social Action Party.

The central election committee used the motto "Sell your voice, sell your rights, like selling your life, treason".

== Opinion polls ==
=== Exit polls ===
| Polling organisation/client | PDP | DP | NDP | TNP | NAP | SAP | SRT | TCP | SP | MP | PP | Lead |
| NiyomPoll | 72-74 | 64-66 | 61-63 | 60-62 | 59-60 | 18-19 | 7-8 | 5-6 | 4-5 | 2-3 | 2 | |

== Results ==
| Party | Votes | % | Seats | +/– |
|---|---|---|---|---|
| Democrat Party | 9,703,672 | 21.02 | 79 | +35 |
| Palang Dharma Party | 8,293,457 | 17.96 | 47 | +6 |
| National Development Party | 7,332,388 | 15.88 | 60 | +59 |
| Thai Nation Party | 7,274,474 | 15.76 | 77 | +3 |
| New Aspiration Party | 6,576,092 | 14.24 | 51 | –21 |
| Social Action Party | 1,863,360 | 4.04 | 22 | –9 |
| Seritham Party | 1,645,776 | 3.56 | 8 | New |
| Thai Citizen Party | 1,413,032 | 3.06 | 3 | –4 |
| Solidarity Party | 1,067,237 | 2.31 | 8 | +2 |
| Mass Party | 681,718 | 1.48 | 4 | +3 |
| People Party | 242,221 | 0.52 | 1 | –3 |
| People's Force | 73,460 | 0.16 | 0 | New |
| Total | 46,166,887 | 100.00 | 360 | 0 |
| Valid votes | 19,118,798 | 97.43 | | |
| Invalid/blank votes | 503,534 | 2.57 | | |
| Total votes | 19,622,332 | 100.00 | | |
| Registered voters/turnout | 31,860,156 | 61.59 | | |
Source: Nohlen et al.
