= Tuan Leekpai =

Thai businesswoman (1915–2011)

Mae Tuan Leekpai
- ถ้วน หลีกภัย
- Born: Kim Tuan Ju Hong; January 15, 1915; Trang Province, Siam
- Died: March 2, 2011 (aged 96); Bangkok, Thailand
- Occupation: Trader
- Known for: Mother of Chuan Leekpai
- Children: Chuan Leekpai (third son)
- Parent(s): Jung Joo-hong (father); Sun Kee Ju Hong (mother)

Tuan Leekpai, (Thai: ถ้วน หลีกภัย; January 1, 1915 - March 2, 2011), popularly known as Mae Tuan (Mother Tuan), was a Thai female trader who was the mother of Chuan Leekpai, the former Prime Minister of Thailand.

== Early life ==
Leekpai was born in Ban Tha Chin village, Bang Rak Subdistrict, Mueang Trang District, Trang Province in 1915 according to the population registration data. According to the Chinese textbook of 1912, her original name was Kim Tuan Ju Hong, the fifth child of seven children of Chung and Sun Kee Ju Hong. Her father and mother were of Hokkien Chinese descent and used the surname "Ju Hong", which is one of the 35 old Hokkien surnames in Trang Province. Her original name was "Kim Tuan", but later it was reduced to "Tuan" as called by southern people. She has four half-sisters.

Leekpai was the granddaughter of Luang Phadung Chan Kasem (Panti), the village headman of Bang Rak Subdistrict who spearheaded the local villagers' reception for King Chulalongkorn (Rama V) during his visit to Trang in 1890. She was also the niece of Jang Jingjit, the first member of the House of Representatives of Trang Province. When Jang ran for election, Tuan was still a child and helped campaign for him because she was interested in politics, until he was finally elected.

When she was a child, she wanted to be a nurse, but her wish was not fulfilled because she did not study. She had little formal schooling and was illiterate. As the eldest child, she took care of her mother who was paralyzed and allowed her younger siblings to study. She also helped her father earn a living by making traditional roof tiles, planting rubber trees, and selling various things until she was able to establish herself at the age of 15.

Tuan married a primary school teacher at Wat Khuan Wiset School, namely Khru Heut or Niyom Leekpai. In Hokkien, his name is Tan Huat, surname Li (Chinese name: Li Chen Fa). She had 9 children with her husband, 6 boys and 3 girls, with Chuan being the third. But even after marriage, Tuan was not only a housewife, but also continued to work as a merchant as usual. They were able to send all nine of their children to school, six boys and three girls. She received the National Outstanding Mother Award in 1993.

== Way of life ==
Leekpai became widely known when Chuan Leekpai became Prime Minister, as a mother who consistently supported her children, such as helping them campaign. Tuan was highly respected by the people of Trang, with villagers often stopping by to seek advice or to ask for help solving problems. This led to people calling her the true representative of Trang Province, earning her the Outstanding National Mother Award in 1993. She was also a highly campaigner for her son Chuan's political campaigns.

Whenever there were visitors, Leekpai, as the owner of the house, would always come out to welcome them. Until the house number 183, Thap Thiang Subdistrict, Wisetkul Road, which was the house where she lived with Kit Leekpai, her eldest son, became well-known to the public and was called "Baan Mae Tuan" and became a tourist attraction in Trang Province. And even though Chuan became Prime Minister, Mrs. Tuan still lived the same life as a fish belly curry vendor in the wet market. But she later quit due to her increasing age and weak health. Her children and grandchildren wanted her to rest at home.

== End of life ==
Tuan passed away peacefully while sleeping at the home of Jongjit Leekpai, her sixth daughter, on Seri Thai Road on Wednesday, March 2, 2011 at the age of 96. The royal cremation ceremony was held on March 12, 2011 at Wat Khuan Wiset, Thap Thiang Subdistrict, Mueang Trang District, Trang Province.
