= Black May (Thailand) =

Mass protest in Bangkok and mass killing by Thai army and police

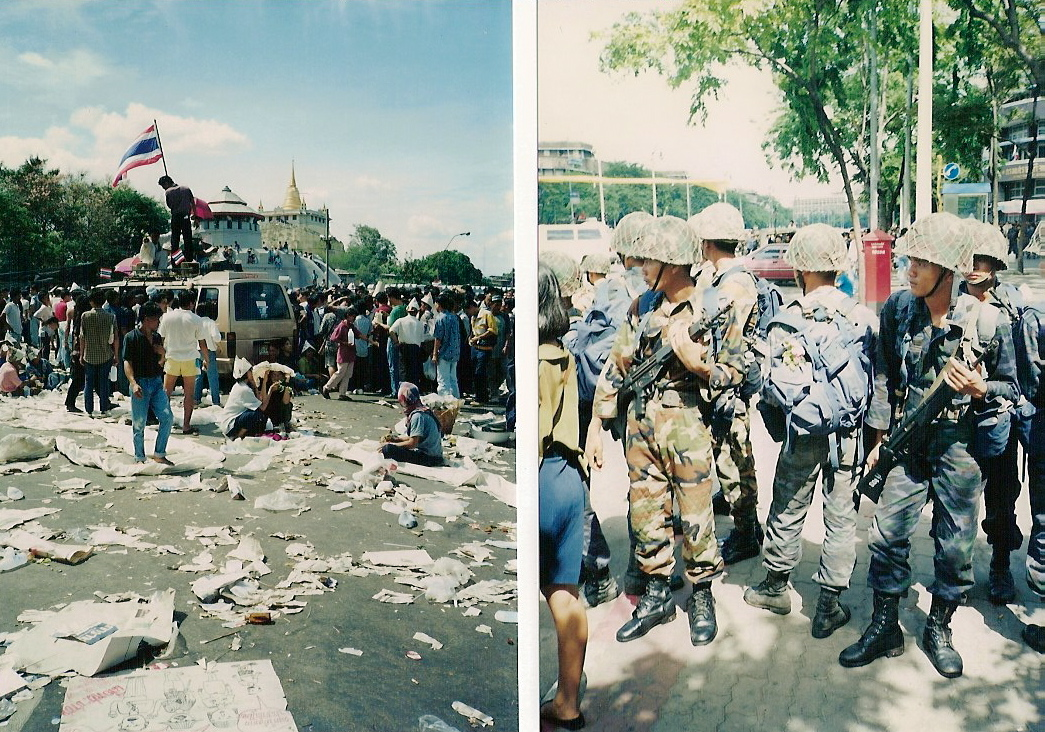
- Protesters and soldiers on Ratchadamnoen Avenue during Black May
- Date: 17–24 May 1992
- Location: Bangkok and surrounding metropolitan area, Thailand
- Caused by: Dissatisfaction with the 1991 Constitution, criticized as undemocratic; General Suchinda Kraprayoon assuming the office of Prime Minister despite previous vows not to do so
- Goals: Opposition to the 1991 Constitution; Opposition to General Suchinda Kraprayoon's appointment as Prime Minister
- Methods: Demonstrations and protest rallies; Hunger strikes
- Result: Resignation of Prime Minister Suchinda Kraprayoon; Meechai Ruchupan serves as Acting Prime Minister; Re-appointment of Anand Panyarachun as Prime Minister to dissolve the House of Representatives

Parties
Protesters: Student Federation of Thailand; (Thailand) Protesting citizens; Political parties: Democrat Party; Palang Dharma Party; New Aspiration Party; Mass Party	Government: National Peace Keeping Council; Royal Thai Army; 9th Infantry Division; 1st Special Forces Regiment (Pa Wai Airborne); Royal Thai Police; Metropolitan Police Bureau; Border Patrol Police; Suchinda Cabinet; Political parties: Samakkhi Tham Party

Lead figures
Chamlong Srimuang; Pallop Pinmanee; Weng Tojirakarn; Chalad Worachat; Prasong Soonsiri; Phrat Sawamiwat	Suchinda Kraprayoon; Sunthorn Kongsompong; Kaset Rojananil; Isarapong Noonpakdee; Narong Wongwan

Casualties
- Deaths: 52 officially confirmed dead; 175 missing (Unverified estimates exceed 500)
- Injuries: 696–1,728
- Arrested: Unknown
- Amnesty granted to all military and government officers involved by royal decree.

Black May (Thai: พฤษภาทมิฬ; RTGS: Phruetsapha Thamin), also known as "Bloody May", was a series of mass protests and subsequent crackdowns by the Thai military and royal police in Bangkok in May 1992. A rally of over 200,000 people led by Chamlong Srimuang was held on 17 May, caused by the extending of the military regime of Suchinda Kraprayoon, the 1991 Thai coup d'état leader. An estimated 52 to 100 protesters were killed, 696 were injured, and 175 had "disappeared" afterwards. King Bhumibol Adulyadej summoned both Chamlong and Suchinda on 20 May, and the Suchinda regime later received a sweeping amnesty along with other law reforms, signed by Bhumibol.

== Background ==
After military strongman Prem Tinsulanonda stepped down in 1988, Thai military leaders from different Armed Forces Academies Preparatory School (AFAPS) classes began to get involved in Thai politics instead. In 1990, amid the conflicts between AFAPS classmates and the elected government of Chatichai Choonhavan, AFAPS Class 1 leader Chavalit Yongchaiyudh launched his own party, AFAPS Class 7 leader Chamlong Srimuang became the Governor of Bangkok, and AFAPS Class 5 leaders staged the 1991 Thai coup d'état.

The coup-makers of Class 5, who called themselves the National Peace Keeping Council (NPKC), appointed Anand Panyarachun as prime minister. The NPKC desired to dominate Thai politics as it established Samakkhi Tham Party (STP) in April 1991. One of the founders, Thiti Nakornthap, was close to Kaset Rojananil and Suchinda Kraprayoon. STP supported Suchinda as the next prime minister, and had strong support and backing from a group of powerful financiers within the party. In May 1991, martial law and restrictions on civil rights were lifted. On 18 November 1991, Suchinda announced to the public that he was withdrawing from politics.

== Prelude ==
In 1992, Anand's interim government promulgated a new constitution and scheduled March 1992 Thai general election. STP won the most seats and formed a government coalition totalling 55% of the lower house. Narong Wongwan, STP leader, was designated prime minister, when media alleged that the United States had refused him entry admission due to the suspection of involvement in drug trafficking. On 7 April, Suchinda was appointed as prime minister, contrast to what he said in 1991. On 8 April, there was widespread public outrage for Suchinda lying and it expanded a military influence into Thai politics, and Chalard Worachat announced a fasting protest in front of Parliament until Suchinda resigned. On 16 April, Suchinda formed the government consisting of corruption politicians that he accused before.

At the first round of demonstrations on 20 April, there were around 50,000 people on the Royal Plaza in front of Parliament House, led by opposition parties, Chavalit's New Aspiration Party, Chuan Leekpai's Democrat Party and the Student Federation of Thailand. A second round was held between 4 and 7 May, protester numbers increased from 70,000 to 100,000. Chamlong began his hunger strike on 5 May and vowed to die in one week if Suchinda did not step down, shortly he became the lead figure of the protest. Protesters were later called the 'Mobile Phone Mob' in recognition of the cell phones that could be heard ringing at protests, it was part of the rise of middle class in Southeast Asia.

On 9 May, Suchinda responded by saying he would support a constitutional amendment making individuals who had not been elected to parliament ineligible for the premiership. Tensions dissipated but the truce was short-lived. Suchinda had ignored the protests, alleged that Chavalit and Chamlong supported the movement to revenge him. Air Chief Marshal Kaset Rojananil, head of the National Peace Keeping Council and General Isarapong Noonpakdee, head of its subsidiary the Bangkok Peacekeeping Council warned protesters not to attend the rally alleging support from ill-intentioned persons.

Before the third round of demonstrations, the Confederation for Democracy (CFD), an oppositional alliance against the military-sponsored government of Suchinda Kraprayoon was formed, mainly led by Chamlong Srimuang who just resigned from the leadership position of Palang Dharma Party, Prinya Thaewanarumitkul of the Students Federation of Thailand, slum-dwellers' activist Prateep Ungsongtham, the daughter of the now-incarcerated Chalard Worachat, trade unionist Somsak Kosaisuuk, politician Veera Musikapong, and academics Sant Hathirat and Weng Tojirakarn. The second round of peaceful protests eventually ended on 11 May, Chamlong later announced a third round would start on 17 May.

On Sunday, 17 May, the two leading government parties announced that although they supported the constitutional amendment, they also favoured transitional clauses that would permit Suchinda to serve as prime minister for the term of the parliament. It became clear the government parties would not honour their word and plans went ahead for a strike on 17 May. Obviously concerned about the people's mounting anger, the interior minister ordered provincial governors to prevent people from travelling to Bangkok to join the rally. Suchinda threatened to sack Chamlong, the Governor of Bangkok, for allegedly assisting the anti-government rallies of the previous week, while the army hastily arranged a competing "Anti-Drought Musical Festival" to be held at the Army Auditorium. Radio stations were banned from playing recordings by several popular singers who had voiced their support for the demonstrations.

== Massacres ==
=== Rally to the Government House ===
On 17 May 1992, Chamlong led a protest at Sanam Luang, the rally was the biggest since the popular uprising in 1973. At its peak, 200,000 people filled Sanam Luang, overflowing onto the encircling streets. At about 20:30, Chamlong, Sudarat Keyuraphan, and Sant Hatthirat led the protesters on a two-kilometre march to the Government House to demand Suchinda's resignation. The protesters were halted at Phan Fa Lilat Bridge, which had been barricaded with razor wire by the police. At 11.00 pm, a group of demonstrators attempted to break through the barricade, but were repulsed by water cannons from four fire trucks blocking the way. The protesters then tried to take over two of some ten fire engines stationed nearby, but were beaten back by riot police armed with batons and shot by water cannons. Soon, the protesters replied with stones and Molotov cocktails. Chamlong used a loudspeaker to urge the marchers not to attack the police, but his words were ignored. In this initial clash, about 100 protesters and 21 policemen were injured. By midnight, two fire engines had been set on fire, and the situation was spiralling out of control. Some 700 troops had been called in and the fighting fanned out from Phan Fa Lilat Bridge.

=== Firing at the crowd ===
At 0.30 am, Suchinda declared a state of emergency, making gatherings of more than ten people illegal. The government urged the people to go home but the protesters still continued until morning of 18 May. Presses "that endanger public security or cause public unrest" were banned. Three newspapers, the English-language The Nation, and Thai language dailies Naew Na and The Manager were ordered to close for three days, but the order was revoked a few hours after.

The army fired M16 rifles directly at the crowd at 4.15 am, after initially firing in the air to disperse the protesters. At least five people believed to have been killed in this shooting, with others injured by baton attacks. Hospitals in the area were already receiving the injured, including four with gunshot wounds who died that night. Government buildings and police vehicles were set on fire, a "third party" was involved in initiating violence on Phan Fa Bridge, according to Chamlong.

Chamlong and protesters remained near Phan Fa Lilat Bridge and nearby Democracy Monument. At around 6 am, the army began firing in the air again, which injured dozens of people. The government brought in more troops and crowds grew larger in other sections of the city.

Early on the afternoon of 18 May, Suchinda publicly accused Chamlong of fomenting violence and defended the government's use of force. Shortly thereafter, troops firing continuously in the air moved in to surround Chamlong. He was handcuffed and arrested, and was taken away to Bangkhen Police Academy, where political prisoners were usually detained. The rest of CFD leaders were also arrested. However, the crowds still did not disperse, and violence escalated.

=== Violence in Bangkok ===
In the evening of 18 May, more than tens of thousands protesters still gathered around Democracy Monument and Ratchadamnoen Avenue. Buses filled with unarmed protesters were positioned in front of the barricade between 7.30 pm and 9.30 pm. The army fixed bayonets at 9.30 pm, caused some demonstrators to raise their arms in confrontation to dare the forces to shoot. At 10.30 pm one bus moved quickly and another was pushed slowly into the barricade. At approximately 10.30 pm, The army, receiving an order from a major general to the 2nd Infantry Battalion, 19th Infantry Regiment of the Kanchanaburi-based 9th Infantry Division in full military gear fired directly into the crowd again at head height at the top of Ratchadamnoen Avenue. The police also shot protesters point blank into the crowd. Members of Task Force 90, an anti-terrorist force, mixed in the crowd and shot several protesters with pistols. At least 20 people were believed to be killed and 100 injured by gun shots, many were shot or attacked from behind while fleeing.

On the early morning of 19 May, the army, firing rifles into the air, stormed the Royal Hotel where demonstrators were hiding, and arrested around 700 people in the hotel. Protesters were kicked and beaten by rifle butts on the head and back, and loaded guns were pointed at them. 2,500 – 3,000 people were detained in a detention center, they were kicked and beaten while being transported in army trucks. There were reports of gunmen shooting protesters in various areas in Bangkok, presuming to be the Royal Thai Police official. Hospitals were instructed by the official not to release information of fatality number. Media were ordered by the Royal Thai Armed Forces to report only the military's version of information. In 1992, official statements reported that 52 people were dead, and almost 700 people were injured from beatings and gunshot wounds.

When government troops secured the area around Phan Fa Lilat Bridge and the Democracy Monument, protests shifted to Ramkhamhaeng University in the east of the city. By the evening of 19 May, about 50,000 people had gathered there. In the evening of 20 May, a 9 pm to 4 am curfew was announced. Bangkok's streets were deserted.

From 17 to 20 May, official statements had reported that 52 people were killed, 696 were injured, and 175 had "disappeared", but unofficial sources reported higher. Medical volunteers reported more than 100 people were killed across Bangkok, according to the New York Times. There were eyewitness reports of a truck filled with bodies leaving the city. Many of those arrested are alleged to have been tortured. The army indicated that 150,000 or 1 million rounds of live ammunition were fired during the operation. The New York Times dubbed the events as the bloodiest popular uprising in the modern history of Thailand, only to be replaced by the 2010 Thai political protests.

=== Royal intervention and amnesty ===
Royal intervention on the night of 20 May. Left to right: Chamlong Srimuang, Suchinda Kraprayoon, and King Bhumibol Adulyadej (seated).

On 20 May, Princess Sirindhorn addressed the country on television in the morning, calling for an end to the violence. Her appeal was rebroadcast throughout the day. That evening, her brother, Crown Prince Vajiralongkorn, broadcast a similar appeal. At 21:30, a television broadcast of King Bhumibol Adulyadej, Suchinda, and Chamlong was shown, in which the King demanded that the two men put an end to their confrontation and work together through parliamentary procedures.

On 23 May, King Bhumibol signed Suchinda's amnesty decree that applied to both side of a conflict, with the reason to protect the security and unity of the country. Academics and pro-democracy activists opposed the decree's legal status almost immediately. Legal experts commented that the decree was invalid because the decree needed to be signed by a meeting of the cabinet, as per the constitution. The decree was issued in the name of the King, and on 25 May was referred by parliament to a constitutional tribunal for judgement.

Suchinda agreed to support an amendment requiring the Prime Minister to be reelected. Chamlong asked the demonstrators to disperse, which they did. On 24 May 1992, Suchinda resigned as Prime Minister of Thailand.

== Aftermath ==
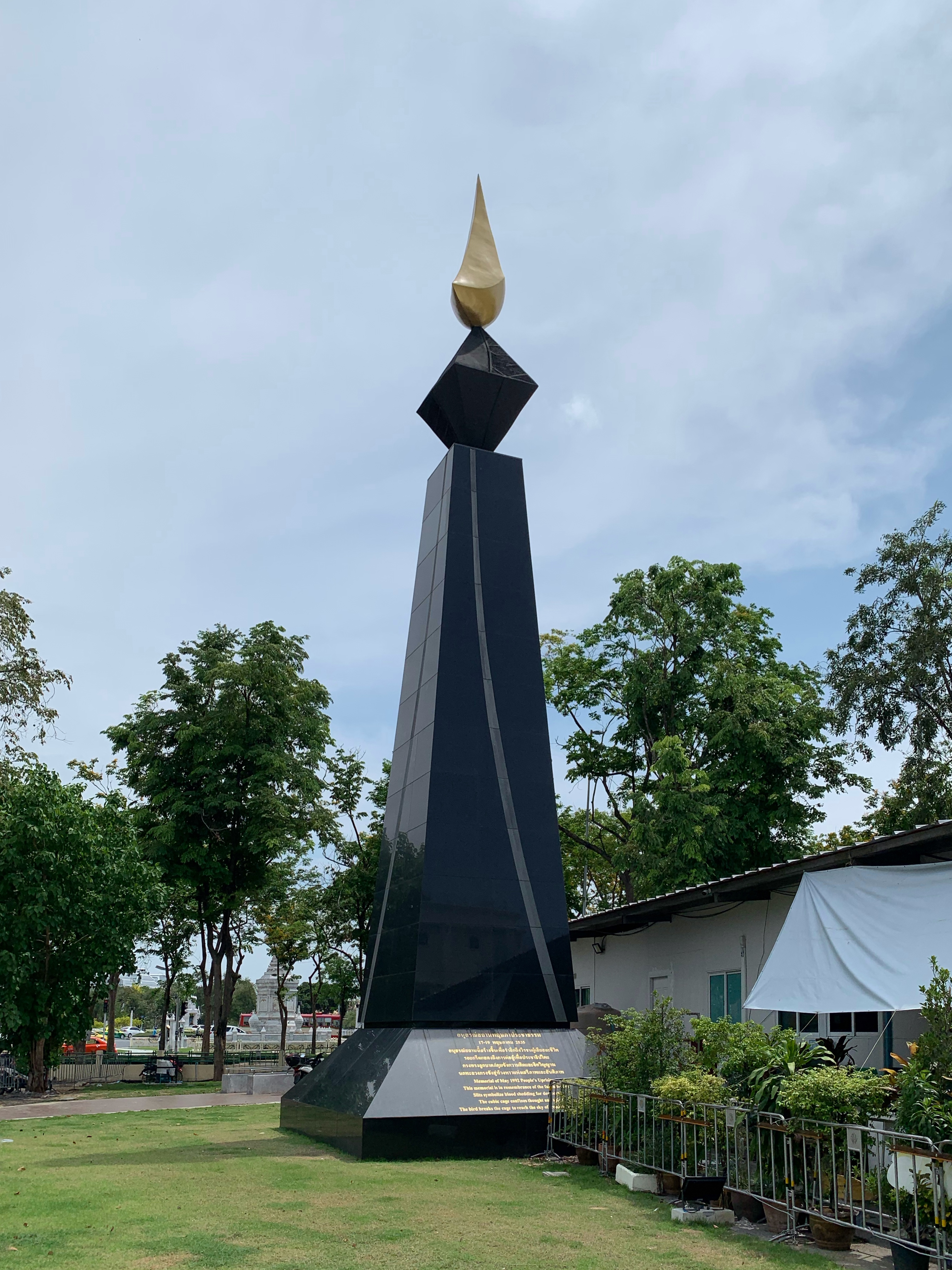
Phreutsapha Prachatham Memorial, dedicated to the lost souls of the event, in Bangkok

=== NPKC deny wrongdoing ===
A House of Representatives Special Committee and a fact-finding committee led by Sophon Rattanakorn shared the same conclusion: the government of General Suchinda used excessive force to crack down on the rally. Some facts from the investigation, such as names of military officers and military units responsible for rounding up, killing, and torturing of protesters were revealed to the public. It is believed these facts were recorded in the report of the Ministry of Defense's Fact Finding Committee led by General Pichit Kullawanit, but it is still kept from the Thai public. The military constitution of 1992 remained in place until 1997, when a replacement was drafted and promulgated.

The government denied using excessive force during the crackdown. Kaset Rojananil, Supreme Commander of the armed forces and director of the National Peace Keeping Council, stated that the army and the police shot protesters in the lower part of the body only. Army Intelligence Chief, Tirawat Pattamanonda claimed that the army and the police who fired directly at demonstrators did so without orders and were poorly trained.

=== Lead figures ===
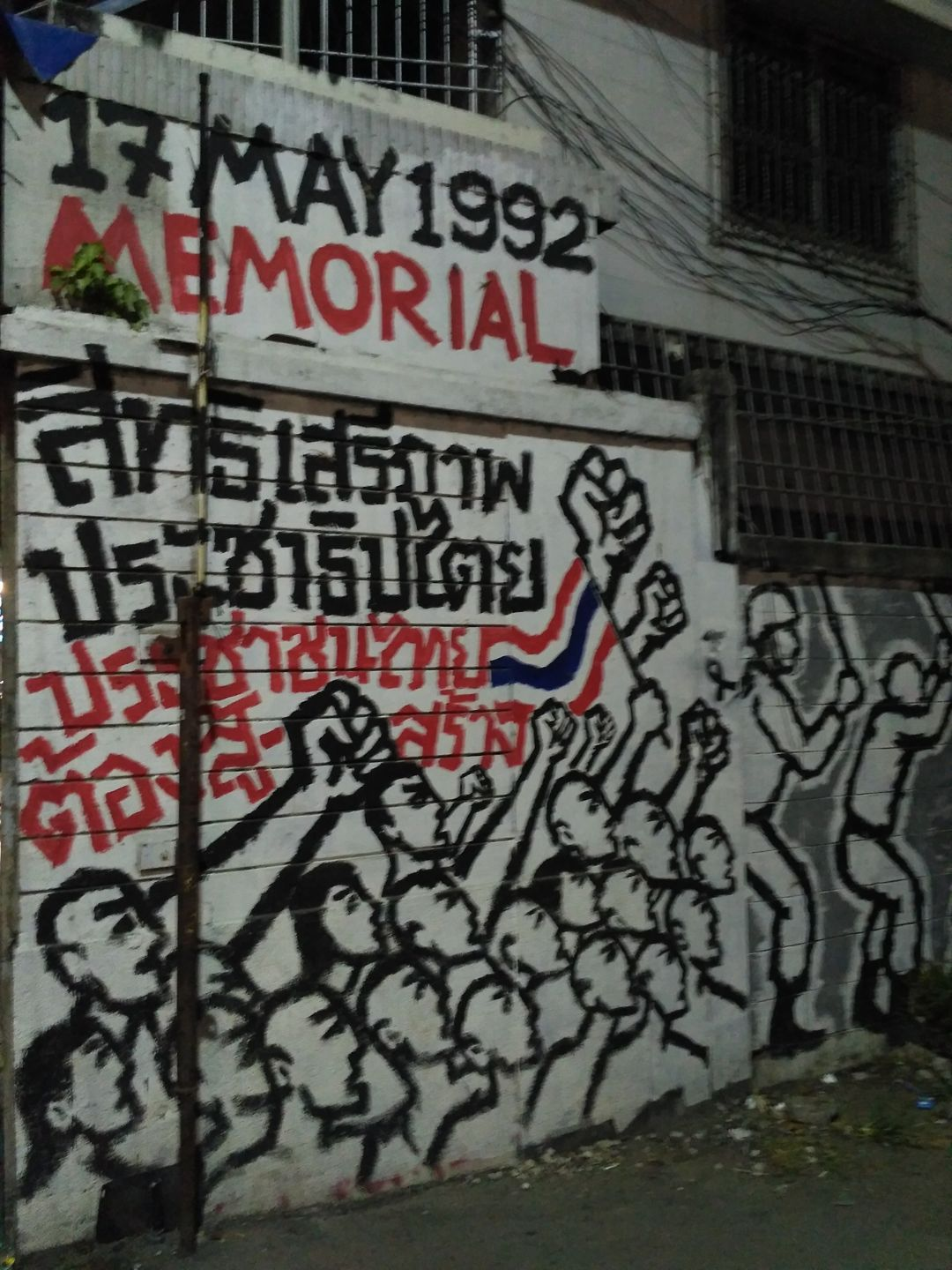
Street art memorial near Khaosan Road

Chamlong later apologized for his role in the events: "I wanted a peaceful rally," he said. "I can't deny some responsibility for the damage and loss of life. I feel deeply sorry for those families whose members were killed in the incident, for those people who were injured and their families." Nevertheless, he noted, "We were right in what we have done." He then retired from politics, eventually to return during the protests against the government of Thaksin Shinawatra.

Suchinda was later appointed chairman of Telecom Asia (today known as True Corporation), a company which received a concession to install two million telephone lines in Bangkok during the Anand Panyarachun government.

=== Investigation ===
In September 2001, Prime Minister Thaksin Shinawatra started a committee to investigate the massacres, headed by former Prime Minister Anand Panyarachun. The committee met and interviewed the victims' families but there were no significant result. In May 2002, the UN Working Group on Enforced or Involuntary Disappearances accepted 31 of 34 cases of people who 'disappeared' during the massacres. These cases were transmitted to the Thai Government.

=== 1997 constitution ===
After the events of 1992 ended, the 1997 constitution was introduced as the first constitution to be drafted by a popularly elected Constitutional Drafting Assembly, hence was popularly called the People's Constitution. The new constitution created a bicameral legislature. For the first time in Thai history, both houses were directly elected. Many human rights are explicitly acknowledged in the text, and measures were established to increase the stability of elected governments, paving the way to Thaksin Shinawatra's Thai Rak Thai Party ascending to a premiership in 2001 and developing another conflict with military-monarchy nexus, culminating in the 2006 Thai coup d'état 14 years later.

== See also ==
- The 2010 Thai military crackdown, dubbed "Savage May" by Thai media.
