= Chuan Leekpai =

Prime Minister of Thailand (1992–1995; 1997–2001)

Chuan Leekpai MPCh MVM ThChW
- ชวน หลีกภัย 呂基文
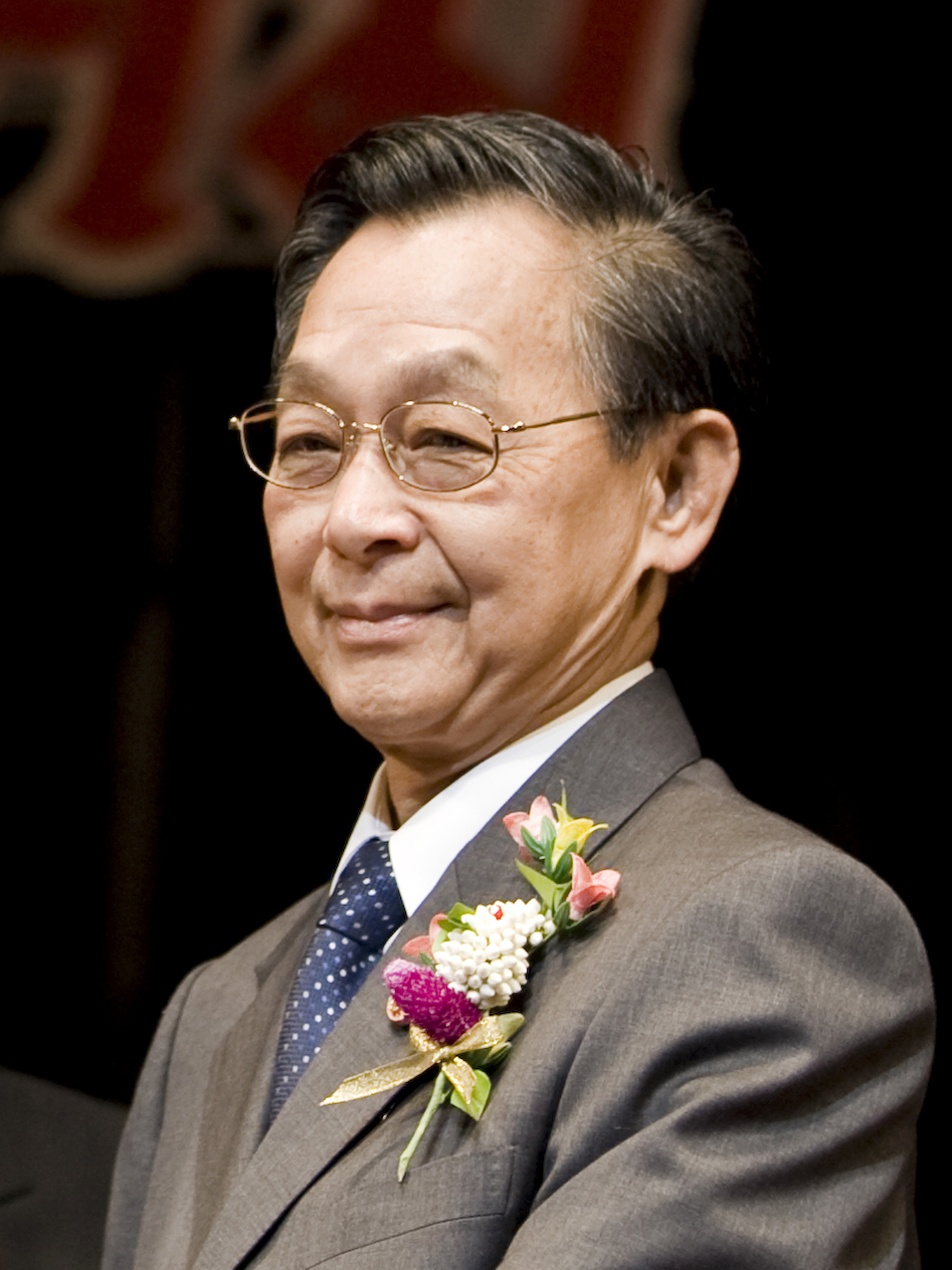
- Chuan in 2009

20th Prime Minister of Thailand
- In office 9 November 1997 – 9 February 2001
- Monarch: Bhumibol Adulyadej
- Deputy: See list: Bhichai Rattakul; Supachai Panitchpakdi; Panja Kesornthong; Suwit Khunkitti; Korn Dabbaransi; Sanan Kachornprasart; Trairong Suwankiri; Banyat Bantadtan; Wirode Pao-in; Suthas Ngernmuen
- Preceded by: Chavalit Yongchaiyudh
- Succeeded by: Thaksin Shinawatra
- In office 23 September 1992 – 13 July 1995
- Monarch: Bhumibol Adulyadej
- Deputy: See list: Banyat Bantadtan; Amnuay Viravan; Boonchu Rojanastien; Supachai Panitchpakdi; Chavalit Yongchaiyudh; Sukavich Rangsitpol; Chamlong Srimuang; Arthit Kamlang-ek
- Preceded by: Anand Panyarachun
- Succeeded by: Banharn Silpa-archa

Speaker of the House of Representatives; President of the National Assembly
- In office 28 May 2019 – 20 March 2023
- Monarch: Vajiralongkorn
- Prime Minister: Prayut Chan-o-cha
- Preceded by: Pornpetch Wichitcholchai (President of the National Legislative Assembly)
- Succeeded by: Wan Muhamad Noor Matha

Speaker of the House of Representatives; Vice President of the National Assembly
- In office 4 August 1986 – 29 April 1988
- Prime Minister: Prem Tinsulanonda
- Preceded by: Uthai Pimchaichon
- Succeeded by: Panja Kesornthong

Deputy Prime Minister of Thailand
- In office 29 December 1988 – 26 August 1989
- Prime Minister: Chatichai Choonhavan
Ministerial offices
Minister of Defence
In office 14 November 1997 – 5 February 2001
Prime Minister	Himself
Preceded by	Chavalit Yongchaiyudh
Succeeded by	Chavalit Yongchaiyudh
Minister of Agriculture and Cooperatives
In office 26 August 1990 – 9 December 1990
Prime Minister	Chatichai Choonhavan
Preceded by	Arnat Arpapirom
Succeeded by	Narong Wongwan
Minister of Public Health
In office 4 August 1988 – 29 December 1989
Prime Minister	Chatichai Choonhavan
Preceded by	Arnat Arpapirom
Succeeded by	Narong Wongwan
Minister of Commerce
In office 11 March 1981 – 19 December 1981
Prime Minister	Prem Tinsulanonda
Preceded by	Punnami Poonnasri
Succeeded by	Punnami Poonnasri
Minister of Justice
In office 3 March 1980 – 5 March 1981
Prime Minister	Prem Tinsulanonda
Preceded by	Sutham Patrakom
Succeeded by	Marut Bunnag
In office 25 September 1976 – 6 October 1976
Prime Minister	Seni Pramoj
Preceded by	Prasit Kanchanawat
Succeeded by	Sangad Chaloryu

Leader of the Opposition
- In office 11 March 2001 – 3 May 2003
- Prime Minister: Thaksin Shinawatra
- Preceded by: Chavalit Yongchaiyudh
- Succeeded by: Banyat Bantadtan
- In office 4 August 1995 – 8 November 1997
- Prime Minister: Banharn Silpa-archa; Chavalit Yongchaiyudh
- Preceded by: Banharn Silpa-archa
- Succeeded by: Chavalit Yongchaiyudh

Leader of the Democrat Party
- In office 26 January 1991 – 4 May 2003
- Preceded by: Bhichai Rattakul
- Succeeded by: Banyat Bantadtan

Member of the House of Representatives
- Incumbent
- Assumed office 6 January 2001
- Constituency: Party list
- In office 10 February 1969 – 9 November 2000
- Preceded by: Korkieart Sudsen
- Succeeded by: Suwan Kusujarit
- Constituency: Trang 1st District

Personal details
- Born: 28 July 1938 (age 88) Mueang Trang, Trang, Siam
- Party: Democrat
- Domestic partner: Phakdiporn Sucharitakul (cohabitating wife)
- Children: Surabot Leekpai
- Education: Thammasat University (LL.B.); The Thai Bar (Barrister); National Institute of Development Administration (NIDA)
- Profession: Politician; Barrister

Chuan Leekpai MPCh MVM ThChW (Chinese: 呂基文; Pe̍h-ōe-jī: Lū Ki-bûn, Thai: ชวน หลีกภัย, RTGS: Chuan Likphai, pronounced [tɕʰūan lìːk.pʰāj]; born 28 July 1938) is a Thai politician who was Prime Minister of Thailand from 1992 to 1995, and from 1997 to 2001. He was President of the National Assembly of Thailand and speaker of the Thai House of Representatives from 2019 to 2023; he also held the latter role from 1986 to 1988.

As the leader of the Democrat Party, Chuan was elected in September 1992, becoming Thailand's first prime minister to come to power without either aristocratic or military backing. His first administration consisted of a five party coalition of the Democrat, New Aspiration, Palang Dhamma, Social Action, and Social Unity Parties until he was defeated in the 1995 election, but assumed power in late-1997 following the fall of the Chavalit Yongchaiyudh administration, which was held responsible for the economic crisis that beset Thailand that year. Although criticised as a slow actor and allowing numerous corruption scandals, Chuan managed to meet factional demands and extend Thailand's social security system.

== Early life ==
Chuan was born to ethnic Chinese parents on 28 July 1938 in Mueang Thap Thiang, Trang province, Thailand, to a teacher, Niyom Leekpai and Tuan Leekpai, Chuan has nine siblings and is the third child in the family. He would later move to the temple school at Wat Amarintraram in Bangkok where he lived for six years. He went on to study law at Thammasat University, Bangkok and later became a barrister-at-laws of the Thai Bar Association. Chuan is ethnic Hokkien, coming from a third-generation Thai Chinese.

== Early political career ==
Chuan joined the Democrat Party at the age of 31 and was first elected to the House of Representatives in 1969 in his home province of Trang. He first entered the cabinet as deputy minister of justice during Prime Minister Seni Pramoj's short-lived government. Under Prime Minister Prem Tinsulanonda, Chuan also served successively as justice minister, commerce minister, agricultural minister, and education minister.

Chuan was defeated in his first bid to become Democrat Party leader in 1979, coming in third place after Thanat Khoman and Uthai Pimchaichon. He later became party leader in 1991, when he defeated Marut Bunnag in a leadership election.

Under Chuan, the Democrat Party's popularity in southern Thailand increased significantly. By 1996, the party won all but five of the region's constituencies. Anthropologist Mark Askew argues that Chuan's personal popularity in the region, stemming from public perceptions of his honesty and his southern roots, became one of the most critical factors in attracting support for the party.

== Prime Minister of Thailand (1992–1995, 1997–2001) ==
=== First premiership (1992–1995) ===
In the aftermath of Bloody May, the Democrat Party won a plurality of seats in the September 1992 elections, with 79 seats, compared to the Chart Thai Party with 77 seats. Chuan formed a coalition government with the New Aspiration Party and Ekkaparb parties. The Phalang Dharma Party joined his cabinet after the New Aspiration Party left in 1994.

Key policies of Chuan's first administration included:

- Engagement with Burma. As with all previous administrations, the Chuan government employed a policy of constructive engagement with the military government of Burma, provoking much criticism.
- Reforestation. A huge five million rai reforestation programme in honour of King Bhumibol's 50th anniversary of accession to the throne (1996) was initiated in 1994. The reforestation programme was officially declared a failure, with less than 40 percent of the target realised. The director-general of the RFD was suspended from his post for alleged corruption.
- Emphasis on national economic stability, decentralisation of the administrative powers to the rural provinces, fostering income, opportunity and economic development distribution to the regions.

The first Chuan administration fell when members of the cabinet were implicated in profiting from Sor Phor Kor 4-01 land project documents distributed in Phuket Province. Fierce public and press criticism and dissolution of parliament were the reasons for his administration's downfall.

=== Second premiership (1997–2001) ===
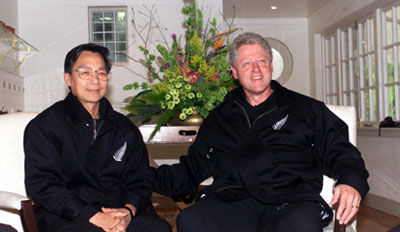
With United States President Bill Clinton in Wellington, New Zealand at the APEC summit, 1999

Chuan became prime minister for the second time on 9 November 1997, replacing Chavalit Yongchaiyudh, with a shaky line-up of a six party coalition and 12 independent defectors from a seventh party, Prachakorn Thai. The ruling coalition increased its 20-seat majority in October 1998, by including the Chart Pattana Party.

==== Economic reform ====
Chuan's second government enacted several economic reforms for which it was severely criticised. Chuan's "bitter medicine" policies brought little economic relief in the years following the 1997 economic crisis, particularly at the grassroots level. Opinions emerged that the Democrats were only helping big financial institutions and making the country more dependent of foreign investors. Nevertheless, many of the reforms recommended by the IMF were in line with the policies of market economies such as Australia and New Zealand. The subsequent government's economic growth was based even more strongly on selling national assets and private organisations abroad such as the Shin Corporation, while most of its economic gains were built on the frugality of the Democrat policy platform. Thai Rak Thai painted the Democrats as having "open contempt" for the plight of the common Thai which set off a revenge vote against the party during the 2001 election, which gave a landslide victory to Thaksin Shinawatra.

==== Education reform ====
During Chuan's second administration the National Education Act 1999 was enacted.

==== Human rights ====
Chuan's second government came under fire for the violent arrest of 223 villagers protesting the Pak Mun Dam. Historian Nidhi Eoseewong noted that "the present situation is as worse as that of the May event (the bloody crackdown of anti-government protesters in 1992). We have a tyrannical government that is arrogant and not accountable to the public. This is dangerous because the government still sees itself as legitimate and claims that it is democratic. In fact, it is as brutal as the military government".

Controversy arose in early 1999 when it became known that Chuan nominated Thanom Kittikachorn to the post of honorary royal guard, provoking widespread criticism. The situation was resolved when Thanom resigned. Thanom was one of the "three tyrants" who ruled Thailand from 1963 to 1973 and ordered the massacre of pro-democracy students on 14 October 1973, after which he was ordered to step down and be exiled by King Bhumibol Adulyadej.

In April 2000, the editor in chief of the Chiang Mai daily newspaper Pak Nua was shot and seriously wounded in an attempted murder, but recovered. The editor believed that his repeated critical reporting on the government led to the assault.

==== Corruption ====
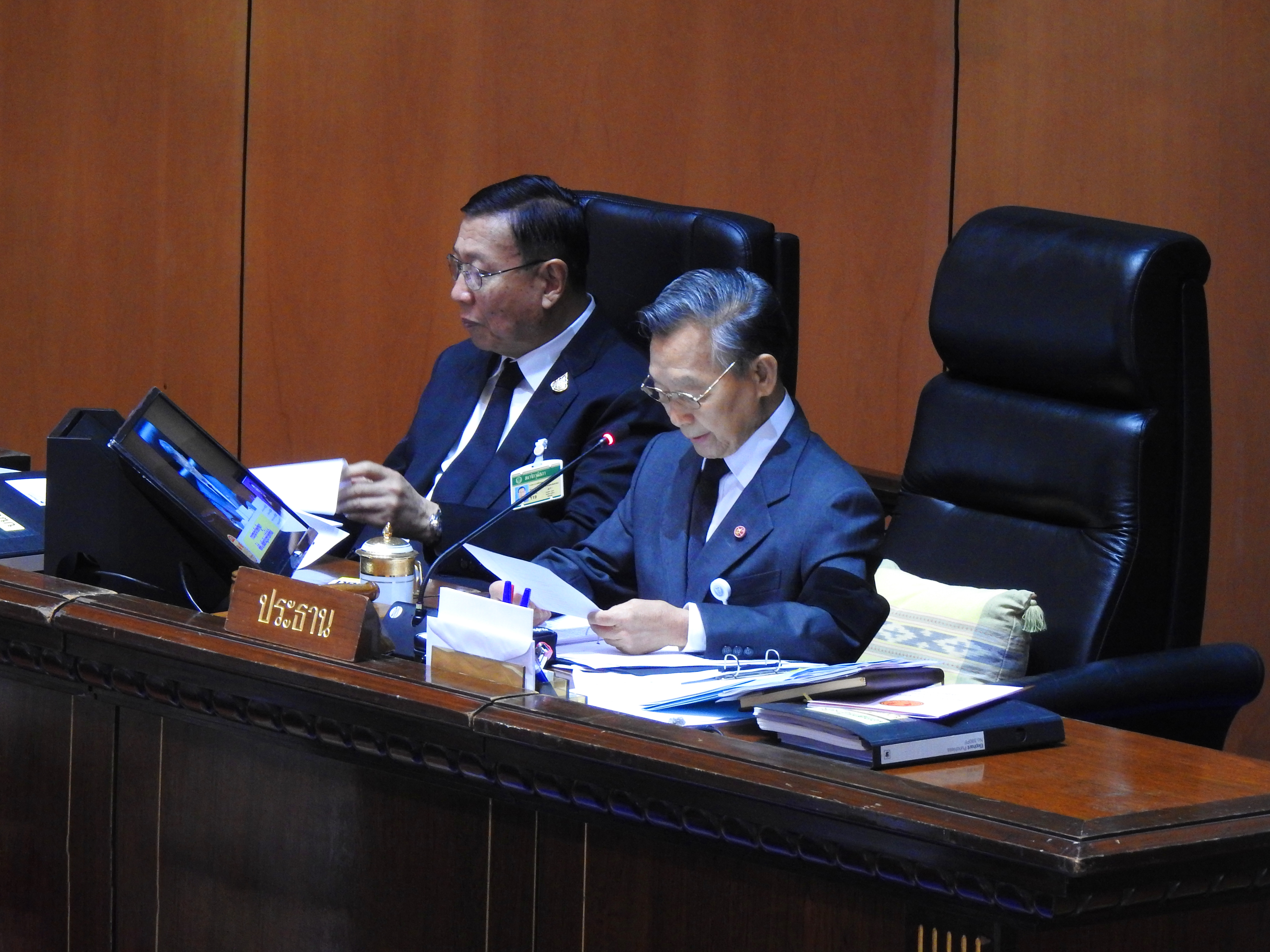
Chuan Leekpai (right) as President of the National Assembly of Thailand from 2019 to 2023

Although generally regarded as relatively clean and honest when compared to other Thai administrations, Chuan's government found itself plagued with corruption scandals and rumours. Key cases of corruption included:

- Rakkiat Sukhthana, Health Minister, was charged with taking a five million baht (US$125,000) bribe from a drug firm and forcing state hospitals to buy medicine at exorbitant prices. After being found guilty, he jumped bail and went into hiding.
- Suthep Thaugsuban, Minister of Transport and Communications, whose brokering of illegal land deals caused the fall of the Chuan 1 government, was linked to abuse of funds in setting up a co-operative Surat Thani Province.
- The "edible fence" seed scandal, in which massive overpricing of seeds distributed to rural areas happened. The Deputy Minister of Agriculture was forced to resign.
- The Salween logging scandal, where up to 20,000 trees were felled illegally in the Salween forest in Mae Hong Son. Some of them turned up in the compound of the Democrat party's office in Phichit Province.
- Sanan Kajornprasart, Interior Minister, as well as eight other cabinet ministers were found to have understated their declared assets. Sanan was later barred by the Constitutional Court from politics for five years.
- Chuan himself was found by the National Counter-Corruption Commission to have undeclared shareholdings in a rural cooperative.

Chuan stepped down as the leader of the Democrat Party in 2003.

== Post-premiership ==
Chuan remains an active politician, continuing to serve as a Democrat party-list MP since he stepped down as prime minister. After the Democrat Party joined the Palang Pracharath-led coalition government in 2019, Chuan became speaker of the House of Representatives.

He was elected to his 18th term as MP in the 2026 general election. To date, he has never failed to be elected in any parliamentary election that he contested.

== Personal life ==
Chuan Leekpai has one son, Surabot Leekpai, with Pakdiporn Sujaritkul, his common-law wife. His mother tongue is Southern Thai, but his proficiency in Central Thai is native level. He is able to speak English well.

Although Mr Chuan is known for his honesty and humble lifestyle, the same cannot be said about his son, who is known to be rather extravagant. Recently, in 2023, his eldest son came under investigation for crypto fraud of over 15 million THB.

Chuan enjoys sketching and painting. His drawings have been exhibited by the Ministry of Culture.

== Awards and decorations ==
=== National honours ===
- Thailand:
  - Knight Grand Cordon (Special Class) of the Most Exalted Order of the White Elephant
  - Knight Grand Cordon (Special Class) of The Most Noble Order of the Crown of Thailand
  - Knight Grand Commander (Second Class, higher grade) of the Most Illustrious Order of Chula Chom Klao
  - Order of Symbolic Propitiousness Ramkeerati
  - Recipient of the King Rama IX Coronation Medal
  - 25th Buddhist Century Celebration Medal
  - Serving Free Peoples Medal
  - First Class (Gold Medal) of the Red Cross Medal of Appreciation

=== Foreign decorations ===
- Philippines:
  - Grand Collar (Raja) of the Order of Sikatuna (1993)
- Peru:
  - Grand Cross of the Order of the Sun (1999)
- Portugal:
  - Grand Cross of the Order of Christ (1999)
- Nicaragua:
  - Grand Cross of the Order of Rubén Dario (2000)
- Romania:
  - Grand Cross of the Order of the Star of Romania (2000)
- Denmark
  - Grand Cross of the Order of the Dannebrog (2001)

Political offices
Preceded by Anand Panyarachun	Prime Minister of Thailand; 1992–1995	Succeeded by Banharn Silpa-archa
Preceded by Chavalit Yongchaiyudh	Prime Minister of Thailand; 1997–2001	Succeeded by Thaksin Shinawatra
