= Justice Unity Party =

Former Political parties in Thailand

Justice Unity Party พรรคสามัคคีธรรม
- Leader: Narong Wongwan
- Secretary-General: Thiti Nakornthap
- Advisory Chairman: Arthit Kamlang-ek
- Founded: 3 January 1992
- Dissolved: July 1992
- Headquarters: Bangkok
- Ideology: Conservatism; Militarism
- Political position: Right-wing

The Justice Unity Party (Thai: พรรคสามัคคีธรรม, RTGS: Phak Samakkhi Tham), which later changed its name to the Liberal Party (Thai: พรรคเทิดไท, RTGS: Phak Thoet Thai), was a Thai pro-military and conservative political party established after the military coup d'état of 1991. It represented the interests of the military, bureaucracy and provincial business owners.

== History ==
=== Foundation and March 1992 election ===
The party was founded by Narong Wongwan, who became party chairman, and Thiti Nakornthap, who was close to the National Peace Keeping Council. It enjoyed the support of junta leader Air Chief Marshal Kaset Rojananil. The Justice Unity Party won the parliamentary election in March 1992 and nominated Suchinda Kraprayoon to become prime minister. In the ensuing conflict between the military-backed government and the pro-democratic movement, Thai media counted the party among the so-called "devil parties". The conflict eventually escalated to a bloody crackdown on the opposition protest movement ("Black May") and the downfall of the Suchinda government. As a result, the party was discredited and most of its representatives deserted it to join more promising parties, mainly the National Development Party.

=== Name change and dissolution ===
Liberal Party พรรคเทิดไท
- Leader: Anuwat Wattanapongsiri
- Secretary: Sompong Amornwiwat
- Founded: 22 July 1992
- Dissolved: 24 December 1992
- Preceded by: Justice Unity Party
- Headquarters: Bangkok, Thailand

On 9 July 1992, the Justice Unity Party changed its name and elected a new executive committee, becoming the Liberal Party. Anuwat Wattanapongsiri became the party leader and Sompong Amornwiwat became the secretary. The changes were announced by the Government Gazette on 22 July 1992.

After running the Liberal Party briefly, Anuwat and the entire party executive committee announced their resignation from the party on 10 August 1992. The party then ceased political activity, with no candidates standing in the September 1992 election. The Supreme Court therefore issued Supreme Court Order 4098/1992, dated 24 December 1992, to dissolve the Liberal Party.

== Justice Unity Party Speaker ==
Name	Portrait	Periods in Office	Election
Arthit Ourairat		3 April 1992 – 30 June 1992	March1992 (17th)
