= Narong Wongwan =

Thai politician (1925–2020)

- ณรงค์ วงศ์วรรณ

Deputy Prime Minister of Thailand
- In office 7 April 1992 – 9 June 1992
- Prime Minister: Suchinda Kraprayoon

Minister of Agriculture and Cooperatives
- In office 7 May 1983 – 5 August 1986
- Prime Minister: Prem Tinsulanonda
- Preceded by: Chuan Leekpai
- Succeeded by: Han Leelanon

Personal details
- Born: 25 December 1925 Phrae, Siam
- Died: 10 September 2020 (aged 94) Chiang Mai, Thailand
- Party: Solidarity Party; Justice Unity Party; Thai Nation Party
- Spouse: Urai Wongwan

Narong Wongwan (Thai: ณรงค์ วงศ์วรรณ; 25 December 1925 – 10 September 2020) was a Thai politician and tobacco industrialist. He was a long-term member of parliament representing Phrae, leader of the Solidarity Party and the Justice Unity Party. He was publicly known as the "godfather" (jao pho) of Phrae or even "godfather of the North".

== Life and career ==
Narong Wongwan was born in Phrae, where his grandfather had acquired a fortune from wood production. Narong studied economics in the United States. After working for the family's saw mill for some time, he went into tobacco growing and curing in the 1950s. During the 1970s the tobacco business in Northern Thailand boomed and Narong became a multi-millionaire. Many peasants of Phrae and the neighbouring provinces were employed on Narong's and his family's plantations and in their curing plants. Therefore, he accumulated considerable economic and social influence in the region. This was used by him as a base for his political career.

Narong was a member of Phrae's provincial council as early as 1949. He founded the Solidarity Party (Ruamthai) and was elected member of parliament in 1979. He was steadily re-elected in all elections until 1992. He joined the government of prime minister Prem Tinsulanonda, becoming deputy interior minister in 1980, deputy minister of agriculture in 1981, rising to be minister in 1983. After the election of 1986, his party was in the opposition. In 1989, he merged his party with three minor parties and renamed it Solidarity Party. After a cabinet reshuffle, the party became part of Chatichai Choonhavan's government coalition and Narong was again made minister of agriculture.

After the coup d'état of 1991 and ahead of the election in March 1992, he joined other provincial businessmen, bureaucrats and supporters of the military coup group to form the Justice Unity Party, of which he became the chairman. The party won the election and Narong was designated prime minister, when media alleged that the United States had refused him entry admission due to the suspection of involvement in drug trafficking. The US government threatened that relations between the two countries could worsen in case that Narong became head of government.

He had to relinquish premiership and the parliament instead nominated the putschist General Suchinda Kraprayoon. Really, Narong had not been prosecuted as there was not sufficient evidence. As the leader of the biggest coalition party, Narong still became deputy prime minister under Suchinda. After the bloody crackdown on the oppositional movement protesting against the military-backed government, the Justice Unity Party was discredited and dissolved. Narong instead joined the Thai Nation Party. After the party's electoral success in 1995, Narong was poised to become minister of interior, but again he was hindered by allegations of criminal activity. In 2000, Thailand's Supreme Court condemned the tabloid newspaper Khao Sot for spreading false allegations against Narong.

Narong died at the age of 94 with a senile disease on the night of 10 September 2020 at 11:01 P.M. at Maharaj Nakorn Chiang Mai Hospital.

== Honours ==
- Order of the White Elephant
- Order of the Crown of Thailand
