= Thai Citizen Party =

Political party in Thailand

Thai Citizen Party พรรคประชากรไทย
- Abbreviation: TCP
- Leader: Kanisorn Sommaluan
- Founder: Samak Sundaravej
- Founded: 9 March 1979; 47 years ago
- Headquarters: Bangkok
- Ideology: Libertarianism
- Political position: Right-wing to far-right
- Colors: Light blue

The Thai Citizen Party (TCP) or Prachakorn Thai Party (Thai: พรรคประชากรไทย, RTGS: Phak Prachakon Thai) is a political party in Thailand. It was founded in 1979 and has never been officially dissolved, but lost any political significance in 2001 when it was abandoned by its long-term leader Samak Sundaravej. The TCP had a strongly royalist ideology, was close to the military and positioned on the far right wing of Thai politics.

== History ==
The Thai Citizen Party was founded in 1978 by Samak Sundaravej who had been the main representative of the Democrat Party's right wing until then. It was officially registered in 1979 when a new constitution lifted the ban of all political parties. Samak had been known as a firebrand right-wing and ultra-royalist orator during the mid-1970s and served as minister of interior under Thanin Kraivichien after the Thammasat University massacre of 1976 until 1977. With the TCP, Samak created a competition for the Democrat Party in its traditional stronghold Bangkok. The party failed, however, to extend its appeal to constituencies outside the capital.

TCP was launched with a rally at Sanam Luang to a huge crowd on Friday, March 9, 1979, the same day as the party's founding. At that time, the party uses the slogan Kho fha fun phong pai duay jai tanpng (ขอฝ่าฟันผองภัยด้วยใจทนง, "overcome danger with a proud heart"), which was part of the song Kwam Fun Un Sung Sud (ความฝันอันสูงสุด, "The Impossible Dream") by the King Bhumibol Adulyadej (Rama IX).

In the 1979 general election, TCP won 32 of 301 seats: almost all of the Bangkok constituencies, but only three outside the capital. In 1983, it increased its number of seats to 36 of 324 (24 of which were elected in Bangkok), and became part of Prem Tinsulanonda's government coalition. In the 1986 election, the TCP lost 12 seats (most of them went to the reinvigorated Democrats) and went into opposition. In the 1988 snap election, the party recovered 31 of now 357 seats. It was included in Chatichai Choonhavan's government coalition from 1990 to 1991.

In the March 1992 election, TCP lost most of its seats, dropping to 7 of 360, faced with the competition of the new Palang Dharma Party which attracted a majority of the Bangkok middle-class electorate. However it was provided with positions in Suchinda Kraprayoon's pro-military cabinet that was confronted with civic mass protests during "Black May". After the government's resignation, fresh elections in September 1992 brought the party's utter defeat, as it was associated by the urban middle class with the old government's attempt to violently suppress the popular uprising. It dropped to only 3 seats. It could recover a little, winning 18 of 55 seats in Bangkok's city assembly in 1994. One year later it also regained some strength on the national level, winning 18 out of a total of 391 seats, mostly due to the rival Palang Dharma Party's loss of popularity in Bangkok. It joined Banharn Silpa-archa's coalition government.

In the snap poll of 1996, its number of seats remained the same, and it continued to be part of the government, now under Chavalit Yongchaiyudh. When the parliament unseated Chavalit in a vote of no confidence at the peak of the 1997 Asian financial crisis, the party split: 12 of its 18 members of parliament (MPs)—the so-called "Cobra faction"—supported the new government of Chuan Leekpai, defying a party board resolution not to do so, and were therefore expelled from the party. The Constitutional Court was invoked and decided that MPs were allowed to keep their seats and to join another party after being expelled from their original party.

In 2001, TCP founder and long-term leader Samak abandoned his party after he had been elected Governor of Bangkok on a nonpartisan platform.
