= Mass Party =

Mass Party พรรคมวลชน
- Founded: 13 June 1985
- Dissolved: 27 March 2010
- Headquarters: Bangkok, Thailand

The Mass Party (Thai: พรรคมวลชน, RTGS: Phak Muanchon, pronounced [pʰák mūan.choːn]) was a former Thai political party that played a role in the country's politics during the 1980s and 1990s. It was considered a minor party.

It was founded in 1985 by a local Thonburi lawyer, Somsak Phakipho. However, an important figure who later became the party leader was Chalerm Yubamrung, who had moved from the Democrat Party. The party was considered to have a strong support base in the Thonburi area of Bangkok, particularly in the districts of Bangkok Yai, Phasi Charoen, Nong Khaem, as well as Bang Khae, Bang Bon and Bang Khun Thian.

Due to the changing political landscape, the party's influence declined after 2000. Key figures, such as Chalerm Yubamrung, moved to other parties, and ultimately the party was dissolved in 2010.

== See more ==
- Thai Citizen Party
