= Solidarity Party (Thailand) =

Solidarity Party พรรคเอกภาพ
- Leader: Chartwat Chartkornkul
- Founded: 1st 10 March 1983; 2nd 26 May 1986; 3rd 18 April 1989
- Dissolved: 17 January 2002
- Colors: Gold

The Solidarity Party is a political party in Thailand founded on 10 March 1983 by Thawi Kaikub. Originally called the Prachathai Party, the name was changed to the Ruamthai Party on 26 May 1986, and later changed again to the Solidarity Party on 18 April 1989.

== List of Leaders ==
1. Narong Wongwan (19 January 1989 – 1 June 1991)
2. Boonchu Rojanastien (27 June 1991 – 20 July 1992)
3. Uthai Pimchaichon (20 July 1992 – 21 August 1995)
4. Chaiyos Sasomsub (29 August 1995 – 13 November 2000)
5. Chartwat Chartkornkul (1 December 2000 – 17 January 2002)
