= 1975 Thai general election =

- 26 January 1975

All 269 seats in the House of Representatives 135 seats needed for a majority
- Registered: 20,242,791
- Turnout: 47.18% (▼1.98pp)
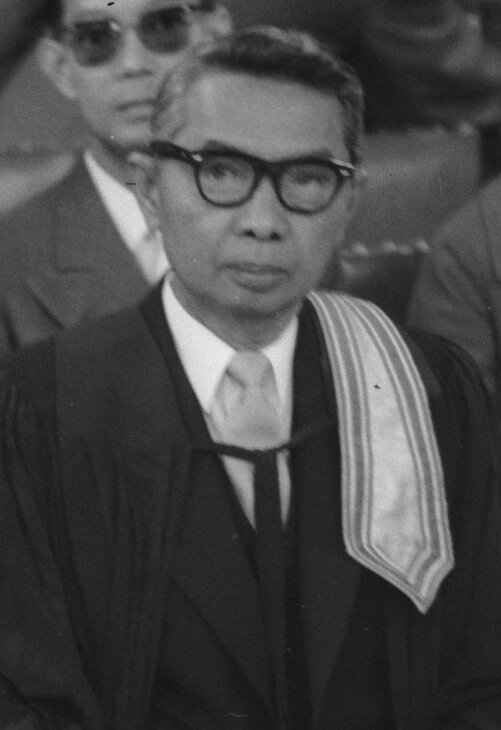

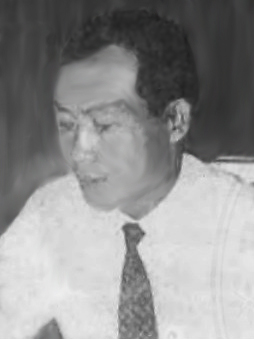

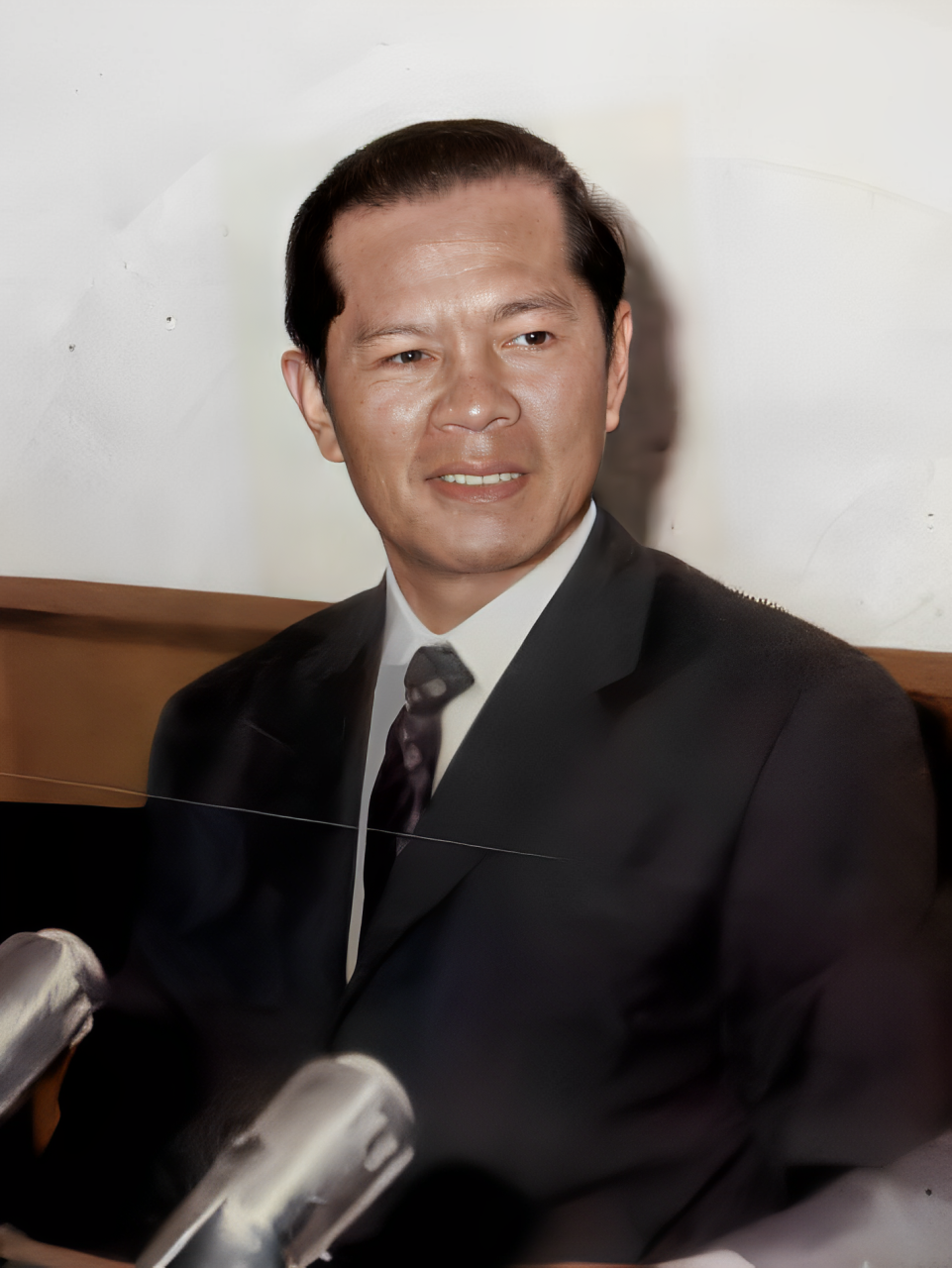

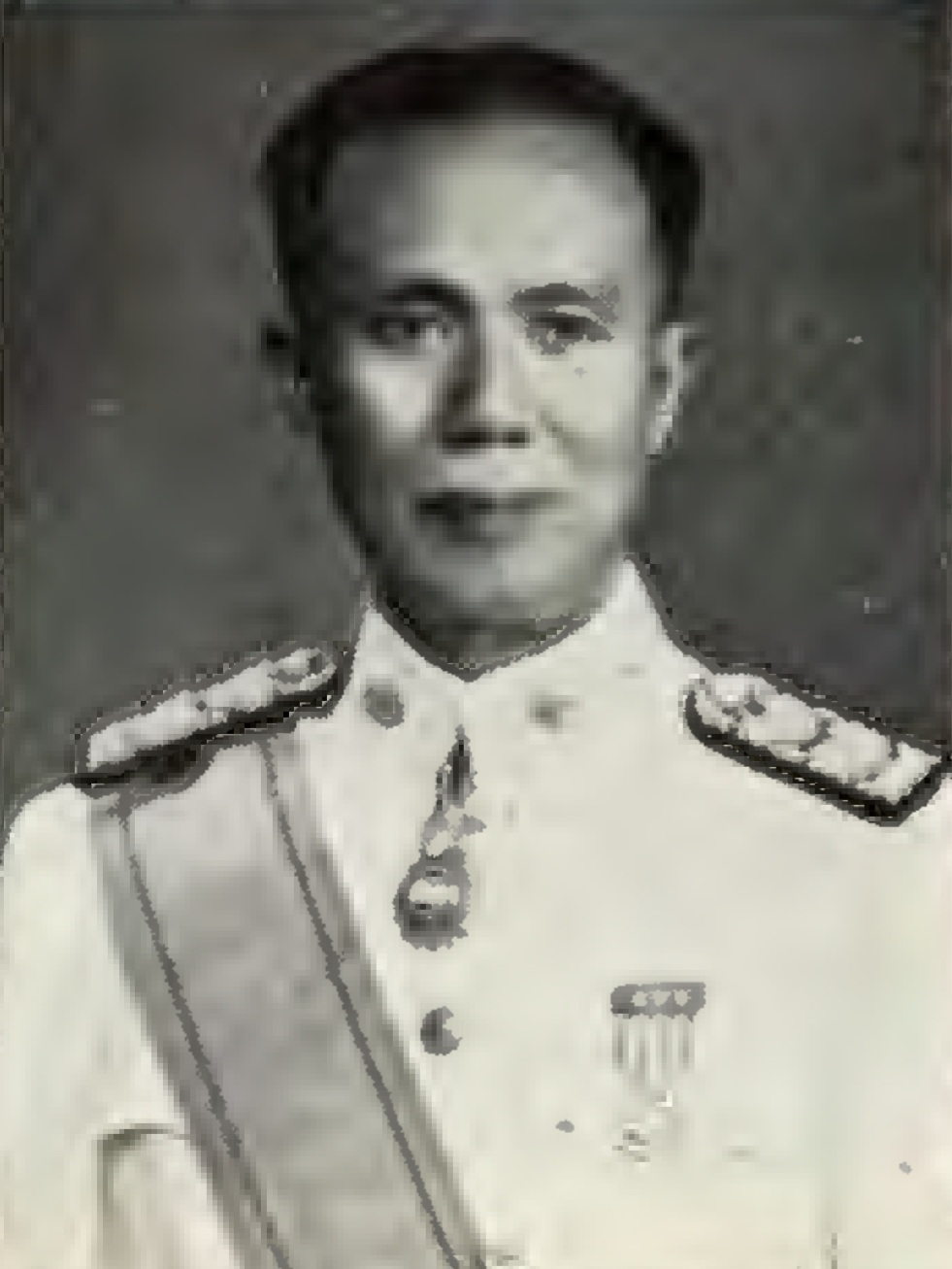

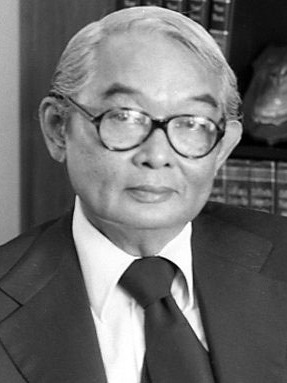

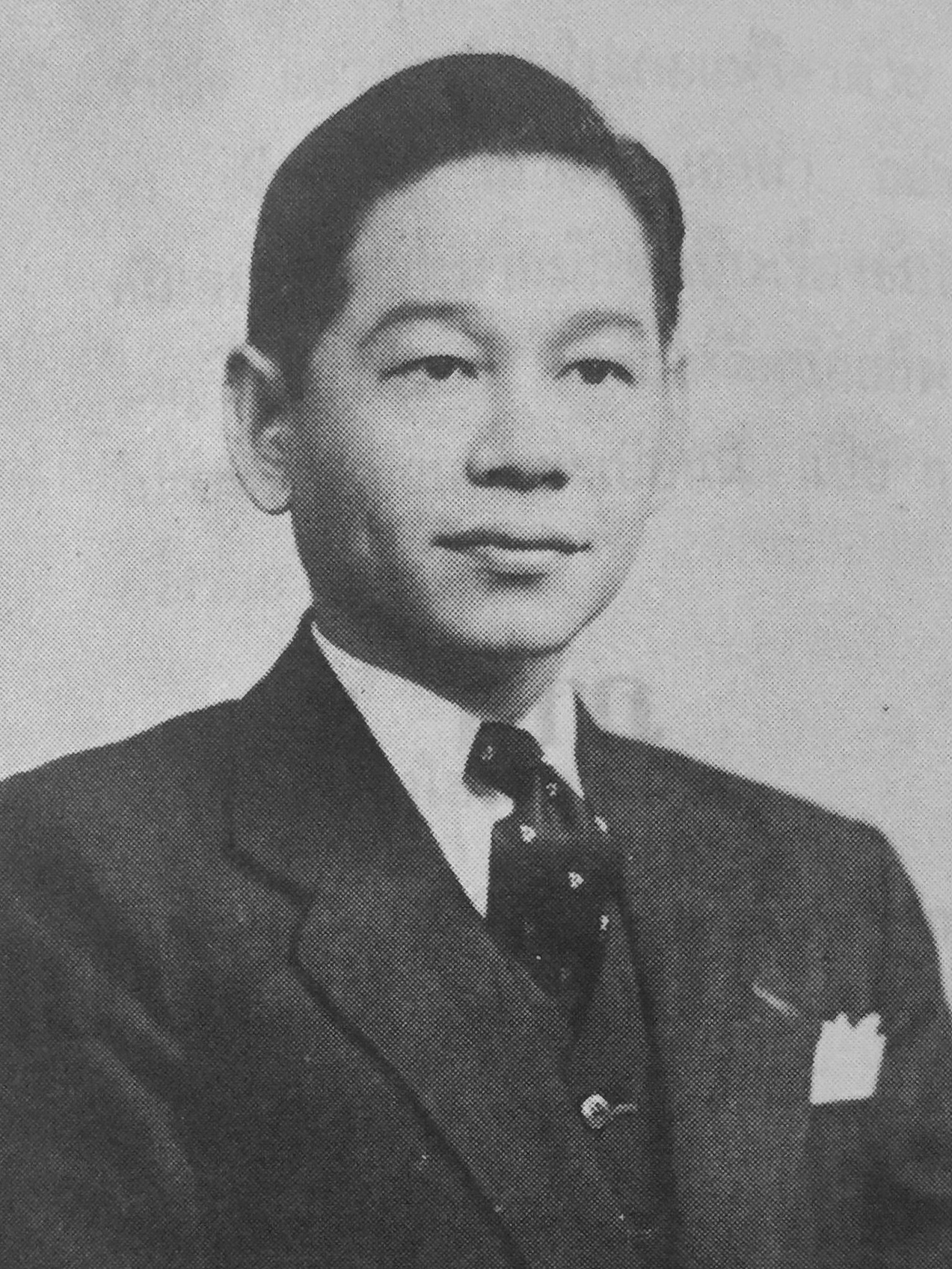

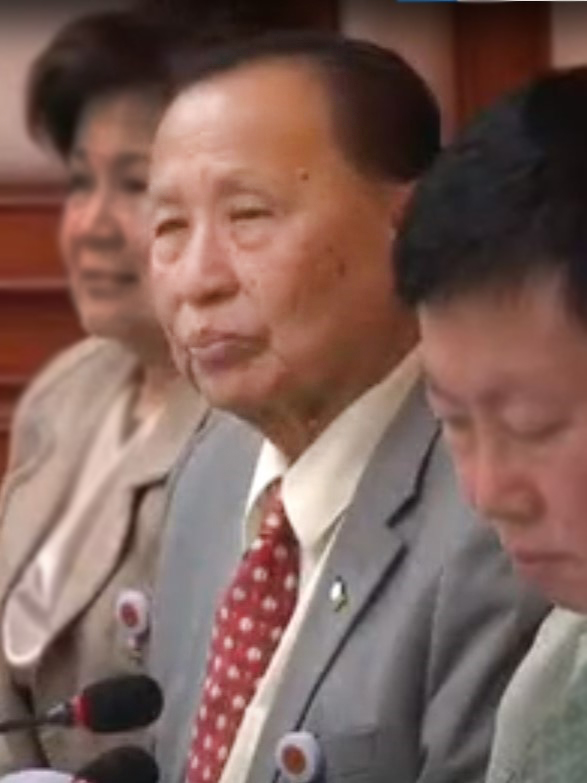
| | First party | Second party | Third party |
|---|---|---|---|
| Leader | Seni Pramoj | Thawit Klinprathum | Pramarn Adireksarn |
| Party | Democrat | Social Justice | Chart Thai |
| Last election | 57 seats | – | – |
| Seats won | 72 | 45 | 28 |
| Seat change | ▲17 | New | New |
| Popular vote | 3,176,398 | 2,669,736 | 2,220,897 |
| Percentage | 17.23% | 14.48% | 12.05% |
| | Fourth party | Fifth party | Sixth party |
| Leader | Sawet Piamphongsant | Kukrit Pramoj | Prasit Kanchanawat |
| Party | Social Agrarian | Social Action | Social Nationalist |
| Seats won | 19 | 18 | 16 |
| Popular vote | 1,387,451 | 1,982,168 | 1,299,613 |
| Percentage | 7.53% | 10.75% | 7.05% |
| | Seventh party | Eighth party |
| Leader | Somkid Srisangkom | Krasae Chanawongse |
| Party | Socialist Party | New Force Party |
| Seats won | 15 | 12 |
| Popular vote | 819,489 | 1,113,653 |
| Percentage | 4.45% | 6.04% |
Prime Minister before election
Sanya Dharmasakti
Independent
Elected Prime Minister
Seni Pramoj
Democrat

General elections were held in Thailand on 26 January 1975. The Democrat Party emerged as the largest party in the House of Representatives, winning 72 of the 269 seats. Voter turnout was 47%.

== Results ==
| Party | Votes | % | Seats | +/– |
|---|---|---|---|---|
| Democrat Party | 3,176,398 | 17.23 | 72 | +15 |
| Social Justice Party | 2,669,736 | 14.48 | 45 | New |
| Thai Nation Party | 2,220,897 | 12.05 | 28 | New |
| Social Action Party | 1,982,168 | 10.75 | 18 | New |
| Social Agrarian Party | 1,387,451 | 7.53 | 19 | New |
| Social Nationalist Party | 1,299,613 | 7.05 | 16 | New |
| New Force Party | 1,113,653 | 6.04 | 12 | New |
| Socialist Party of Thailand | 819,489 | 4.45 | 15 | New |
| Socialist Front | 672,313 | 3.65 | 10 | New |
| Peaceful People's Party | 509,718 | 2.76 | 8 | New |
| National Reconstruction | 369,244 | 2.00 | 3 | New |
| Thai Party | 313,904 | 1.70 | 4 | New |
| People's Justice Party | 297,102 | 1.61 | 6 | New |
| Democracy | 283,990 | 1.54 | 2 | New |
| Sovereign Party | 141,607 | 0.77 | 2 | New |
| Labour Party | 136,783 | 0.74 | 1 | New |
| Golden Cape Party | 123,948 | 0.67 | 0 | New |
| People Party | 122,033 | 0.66 | 0 | New |
| Agriculturalist Party | 116,062 | 0.63 | 1 | New |
| Thai Earth Party | 92,957 | 0.50 | 2 | New |
| Free People's Party | 84,599 | 0.46 | 1 | New |
| People's Force | 67,127 | 0.36 | 2 | New |
| Economist Party | 60,962 | 0.33 | 1 | New |
| Provincial Development Party | 30,103 | 0.16 | 1 | New |
| 21 other parties | 343,164 | 1.86 | 0 | – |
| Total | 18,435,021 | 100.00 | 269 | +50 |
| Valid votes | 8,412,633 | 88.09 | | |
| Invalid/blank votes | 1,137,291 | 11.91 | | |
| Total votes | 9,549,924 | 100.00 | | |
| Registered voters/turnout | 20,242,791 | 47.18 | | |
Source: Nohlen et al.

== Aftermath ==
Following the elections, Seni Pramoj of the Democrat Party was appointed Prime Minister for a second term by a resolution of the House of Representatives by a vote of 133 to 52 on 15 February 1975, with Pramoj leading a minority government. However, on 6 March 1975 the House of Representatives passed a motion of no confidence by a vote of 152 to 111 with six abstentions. Subsequently a new vote was held to choose a prime minister, with Kukrit Pramoj of the Social Action Party elected by a vote of 135 to 59, with 75 abstentions. He took over as prime minister on 14 March.
