= Ministry of Public Health (Thailand) =

Government ministry of Thailand

- กระทรวงสาธารณสุข (Thai)
- Seal of Caduceus by Prince Narisara Nuwattiwong

- Seal of Caduceus by Prince Narisara Nuwattiwong

Ministry overview
- Formed: 1918; 108 years ago
- Jurisdiction: Government of Thailand
- Headquarters: 88/20, 4th village, Tiwanon road, Talat Khwan county, Mueang district, Nonthaburi province, 11000; 13.850014°N 100.528330°E
- Employees: ~400,000
- Annual budget: 135,389 million baht (FY2019)
- Minister responsible: Pattana Promphat, Minister
- Ministry executive: Opart Karnkawinpong, MD, Permanent Secretary
- Website: www.moph.go.th

The Ministry of Public Health (MOPH; Thai: กระทรวงสาธารณสุข, RTGS: Krasuang Satharanasuk) is a Thai governmental body responsible for the oversight of public health in Thailand. It is commonly referred to in Thailand by its abbreviation so tho (สธ.).

The headquarters of the ministry is located in Mueang Nonthaburi, Nonthaburi, and served by Ministry of Public Health MRT station on the MRT Purple Line.

== History ==
In Thailand before 1888 there were no permanent, public hospitals to provide care to sick people. Temporary hospitals were set up to care for patients during epidemics, then disbanded when the epidemic subsided. Under King Chulalongkorn (Rama V) a hospital was constructed and completed in 1888 and named "Siriraj Hospital" in commemoration of the king's young son, Prince Siriraj Kakudhabhand, who had died of dysentery. King Vajiravudh, King Chulalongkorn's successor, established Department of Health on 27 November 1918.

During the reign of King Rama VIII, the Ministry of Public Health was established on 10 March 1942 as a result of the enactment of the Ministries and Departments Reorganization Act (Amendment No. 3) of B.E. 2485. Later in 1966, the date 27 November was chosen as the commemoration day of the Ministry of Public Health's foundation.

== Budget ==
The MOPH was allocated 135,389 million baht in the FY2019 budget.

== Departments ==
=== Organisation ===
- Office of the Minister
- Office of the Permanent Secretary
- Department of Mental Health
- Department of Disease Control
- Department of Health
- Department of Medical Services
- Department of Medical Sciences
- Department of Health Service Support (HSS)
- Department of Thai Traditional and Alternative Medicine
- Food and Drug Administration

=== State enterprise ===
- Government Pharmaceutical Organization

=== Public organisations ===
- Ban Phaeo General Hospital (Public Organisation)
- Healthcare Accreditation Institute (Public Organisation)
- National Vaccine Institute (Public Organization)
- Health Systems Research Institute
- National Health Security Office (NHSO): Manages Thailand's Universal Health Coverage (UHC) system.
- National Institute for Emergency Medicine

== List of Ministers ==
No.	Portrait	Minister	Party	Time of office	Term in office	Prime Minister
1		Chewongsak Songkram ช่วง เชวงศักดิ์สงคราม (1900 - 1962)	Independent	7 March 1942 - 1 August 1944	2 years, 147 days	Plaek Phibunsongkhram
2		Chit na Songkhla จ้าพระยาศรีธรรมาธิเบศ (1894 - 1969)	Independent	2 August 1944 - 2 May 1945	273 days	Khuang Aphaiwong
3		Luang Supachalasai หลวงศุภชลาศัย (1895 - 1965)	Independent	2 May 1945 - 31 August 1945	121 days	Khuang Aphaiwong
4		Thawi Bunyaket อดุล อดุลเดชจรัส (1904 - 1971)	Khana Ratsadon	31 August 1945 - September 17, 1945	17 days	Thawi Bunyaket
5		Adun Adundetcharat อดุล อดุลเดชจรัส (1894 - 1969)	Independent	19 September 1945 – 31 January 1946	134 days	Seni Pramoj
6		Phichit Kriangsakphichit พิชิต เกรียงศักดิ์พิชิต (1896 - 1964)	Independent	2 February 1946 – 24 March 1946	50 days	Khuang Aphaiwong
7		Chey Sunthornpipit พระยาสุนทรพิพิธ (1891 - 1973)	Independent	24 March 1946 – 30 May 1947	1 year, 67 days	Pridi Banomyong
7		Chey Sunthornpipit พระยาสุนทรพิพิธ (1891 - 1973)	Independent	24 March 1946 – 30 May 1947	1 year, 67 days	Thawan Thamrongnawasawat
8		Saeng Suttipong แสง สุทธิพงศ์ (1894 - 1969)	Independent	31 May 1947 – 8 November 1947	161 days	Thawan Thamrongnawasawat
9		Prachuap Bunnak ประจวบ บุนนาค (1921 - 1984)	Independent	8 November 1947 – 21 February 1948	105 days	Khuang Aphaiwong
10		Lek Sumit เล็ก สุมิตร	Independent	25 February 1948 – 8 April 1948	43 days	Khuang Aphaiwong
11		Phraya Borirak Vejchakarn พระยาบริรักษ์เวชชการ (1892 - 1968)	Independent	15 April 1948 - 15 May 1954	6 years, 30 days	Plaek Phibunsongkhram
12		Prayoon Pamornmontri ประยูร ภมรมนตรี (1898 - 1982)	Independent	15 May 1954 - 21 March 1957	2 years, 310 days	Plaek Phibunsongkhram
13		Fuen Ronnaphagrad Ritthakhanee ฟื้น รณนภากาศ ฤทธาคนี (1900 - 1987)	Independent	31 March 1957 – 16 September 1957	169 days	Plaek Phibunsongkhram
Revolutionary Council						Sarit Thanarat
14		Chalerm Prommas เฉลิม พรมมาส (1896 - 1975)	Independent	21 September 1957 - 20 October 1958	1 year, 29 days	Pote Sarasin
14		Chalerm Prommas เฉลิม พรมมาส (1896 - 1975)	Independent	21 September 1957 - 20 October 1958	1 year, 29 days	Thanom Kittikachorn
Revolutionary Council						Sarit Thanarat
15		Phra Bamrasnaradur พระบำราศนราดูร (1896 - 1984)	Independent	10 February 1959 – 7 March 1969	10 years, 25 days	Sarit Thanarat
15		Phra Bamrasnaradur พระบำราศนราดูร (1896 - 1984)	Independent	10 February 1959 – 7 March 1969	10 years, 25 days	Thanom Kittikachorn
16 (1st)		Prasert Ruchirawong ประเสริฐ รุจิรวงศ์ (1911 - 1984)	Independent	9 March 1969 – 17 November 1971	2 years, 253 days	Thanom Kittikachorn
Executive Council						Thanom Kittikachorn
16 (2nd)		Prasert Ruchirawong ประเสริฐ รุจิรวงศ์ (1911 - 1984)	Independent	19 December 1972 – 14 October 1973	299 days	Thanom Kittikachorn
17		Udom Posakrishna อุดม โปษะกฤษณะ (1910 - 1997)	Independent	14 October 1973 – 14 February 1975	1 year, 123 days	Thanom Kittikachorn
18		Klai Laongmanee คล้าย ละอองมณี (1907 - 1985)	Democrat	15 February 1975 – 13 March 1975	26 days	Senj Pramoj
19		Prachum Ratanapien ประชุม รัตนเพียร (1926 - 2013)	Independent	14 March 1975 – 8 January 1976	300 days	Kukrit Pramoj
20		Sawat Khammam สวัสดิ์ คำประกอบ (1919 - 2014)	Independent	8 January 1976 – 12 January 1976	4 days	Kukrit Pramoj
21		Dawee Chullasapya ทวี จุลละทรัพย์ (1914 - 1996)	Social Justice	20 April 1976 - 6 October 1976	169 days	Senj Pramoj
Administrative Reform Council						Sangad Chaloryu
22 (1st)		Yongyut Sajjawanich ยงยุทธ สัจจวาณิชย์ (1928 - 2022)	Independent	8 October 1976 – 20 October 1977	1 year, 12 days	Thanin Kraivichien
Revolutionary Council						Sangad Chaloryu
22 (2nd)		Yongyut Sajjawanich ยงยุทธ สัจจวาณิชย์ (1928 - 2022)	Independent	12 November 1977 – 21 December 1978	275 days	Kriangsak Chamanan
23		Bunsom Martin บุญสม มาร์ติน (1922 - 2008)	Independent	12 May 1979 – 11 February 1980	275 days	Kriangsak Chamanan
24 (1st)		Sam Pringpwangkaew เสม พริ้งพวงแก้ว; 1924 - 2022)	Independent	11 February 1980 – 3 March 1980	21 days	Kriangsak Chamanan
25		Thongyot Chittavira ทองหยด จิตตวีระ (1909 - 1991)	Independent	3 March 1980 – 5 March 1981	1 year, 2 days	Prem Tinsulanonda
24 (2nd)		Sam Pringpwangkaew เสม พริ้งพวงแก้ว (1924 - 2022)	Independent	11 March 1981 – 19 March 1983	2 years, 8 days	Prem Tinsulanonda
26 (1st)		Marut Bunnag มารุต บุนนาค (1924 - 2022)	Democrat	30 April 1983 - 5 August 1986	3 years, 97 days	Prem Tinsulanonda
27		Thedpong Chaiyanan เทอดพงษ์ ไชยนันทน์ (born 1944)	Democrat	August 5, 1986 – August 3, 1988	1 year, 364 days	Prem Tinsulanonda
28		Chuan Leekpai ชวน หลีกภัย (born 1938)	Democrat	4 August 1988 – 29 December 1989	1 year, 147 days	Chatichai Choonhavan
26 (2nd)		Marut Bunnag มารุต บุนนาค (1924 - 1922)	Democrat	29 December 1989 – 22 November 1990	328 days	Chatichai Choonhavan
29		Prachuap Chaisason ประจวบ ไชยสาส์น (1944 - 2020)	Democrat	22 November 1990 – 9 December 1990	17 days	Chatichai Choonhavan
30		Piyanat Wacharaporn ปิยะณัฐ วัชราภรณ์ (born 1949)	Solidarity	9 December 1990 – 23 February 1991	76 days	Chatichai Choonhavan
National Peace Keeping Council						Sunthorn Kongsompong
31 (1st)		Piroj Ningsanon ไพโรจน์ นิงสานนท์ (1928 - 2021)	Independent	2 March 1991 – 22 March 1992	1 year, 20 days	Anand Panyarachun
32 (1st)		Boonphan Khawattana บุญพันธ์ แขวัฒนะ (born 1930)	Independent	7 April 1992 – 9 June 1992	93 days	Suchinda Kraprayoon
31 (2nd)		Piroj Ningsanon ไพโรจน์ นิงสานนท์ (1928 - 2021)	Independent	10 June 1992 – 22 September 1992	104 days	Anand Panyarachun
32 (2nd)		Boonphan Khawattana บุญพันธ์ แขวัฒนะ (born 1930)	Independent	23 September 1992 – 15 September 1993	357 days	Chuan Leekpai
33		Arthit Ourairat อาทิตย์ อุไรรัตน์ (born 1938)	Liberal	23 September 1993 – 12 July 1995	1 year, 292 days	Chuan Leekpai
34		Sanoh Thienthong เสนาะ เทียนทอง (born 1934)	Thai Nation	13 July 1995 – 24 November 1996	1 year, 134 days	Banharn Silpa-archa
35		Montri Pongpanich มนตรี พงษ์พานิช (1943 - 2000)	Social Action	25 November 1996 – 24 October 1997	333 days	Chavalit Yongchaiyudh
36 (1st)		Somsak Thepsuthin สมศักดิ์ เทพสุทิน (born 1955)	Social Action	24 October 1997 – 8 November 1997	15 days	Chavalit Yongchaiyudh
37		Rakkiat Sukthana รักเกียรติ สุขธนะ (1954 - 2019)	Democrat	14 November 1997 – 15 September 1998	305 days	Chuan Leekpai
38		Korn Dabbaransi กร ทัพพะรังสี (born 1945)	Chart Pattana	5 October 1998 – 9 November 2000	2 years, 35 days	Chuan Leekpai
39		Sudarat Keyuraphan สุดารัตน์ เกยุราพันธุ์ (born 1961)	Thai Rak Thai	17 February 2001 – 10 March 2005	4 years, 21 days	Thaksin Shinawatra
40		Suchai Charoenratanakul สุชัย เจริญรัตนกุล (born 1955)	Thai Rak Thai	11 March 2005 – 31 October 2005	234 days	Thaksin Shinawatra
41		Pinit Jarusombat พินิจ จารุสมบัติ (born 1951)	Thai Rak Thai	31 October 2005 – 19 September 2006	323 days	Thaksin Shinawatra
Council for National Security						Sonthi Boonyaratglin
42		Mongkol Na Songkhla มงคล ณ สงขลา (1941 - 2020)	Independent	9 October 2006 – 6 February 2008	1 year, 120 days	Surayud Chulanont
43		Chaiya Sasomsub ไชยา สะสมทรัพย์ (1952 - 2022)	People's Power	6 February 2008 – 9 July 2008	216 days	Samak Sundaravej
44		Chavarat Charnvirakul ชวรัตน์ ชาญวีรกูล (born 1936)	People's Power	2 August 2008 – 23 September 2008	52 days	Samak Sundaravej
45		Chalerm Yubamrung เฉลิม อยู่บำรุง (born 1947)	People's Power	24 September 2008 – 19 December 2008	86 days	Somchai Wongsawat
46		Witthaya Kaewparadai วิทยา แก้วภราดัย (born 1955)	Democrat	19 December 2008 – 30 December 2009	1 year, 11 days	Abhisit Vejjajiva
47		Jurin Laksanawisit จุรินทร์ ลักษณวิศิษฏ์ (born 1956)	Democrat	15 January 2010 - 9 August 2011	1 year, 206 days	Abhisit Vejjajiva
48		Witthaya Buranasiri วิทยา บุรณศิริ (1960 - 2022)	Pheu Thai	9 August 2011 – 28 October 2012	1 year, 80 days	Yingluck Shinawatra
49		Pradit Sinthwanarong ประดิษฐ สินธวณรงค์ (born 1959)	Pheu Thai	28 October 2012 – 22 May 2014	1 year, 206 days	Yingluck Shinawatra
National Council for Peace and Order						Prayut Chan-o-cha
50		Rajata Rajatanavin รัชตะ รัชตะนาวิน (born 1950)	Independent	30 August 2014 – 19 August 2015	354 days	Prayut Chan-o-cha
51		Piyasakol Sakolsatayadorn ปิยะสกล สกลสัตยาทร (born 1948)	Independent	19 August 2015 – 10 July 2019	3 years, 325 days	Prayut Chan-o-cha
52		Anutin Charnvirakul อนุทิน ชาญวีรกูล (born 1966)	Bhumjaithai	10 July 2019 – 1 September 2023	4 years, 53 days	Prayut Chan-o-cha
53		Cholnan Srikaew ชลน่าน ศรีแก้ว (born 1961)	Pheu Thai	1 September 2023 – 27 April 2024	239 days	Srettha Thavisin
36 (2nd)		Somsak Thepsuthin สมศักดิ์ เทพสุทิน (born 1955)	Pheu Thai	1 September 2023 – 27 April 2024	239 days	Srettha Thavisin
36 (2nd)		Somsak Thepsuthin สมศักดิ์ เทพสุทิน (born 1955)	Pheu Thai	27 April 2024 - 19 September 2025	1 year, 145 days	Paetongtarn Shinawatra
54		Pattana Promphat (Note: Pattana was a member of the Palang Pracharath Party until he joined Bhumjaithai on 30 September 2025.) พัฒนา พร้อมพัฒน์ (born 1984)	Palang Pracharath	19 September 2025 - Incumbent	324 days	Anutin Charnvirakul
54		Pattana Promphat พัฒนา พร้อมพัฒน์ (born 1984)	Bhumjaithai	19 September 2025 - Incumbent	324 days	Anutin Charnvirakul

== See also ==
- Government Pharmaceutical Organization (Thailand)
- Health in Thailand
- Hospitals in Thailand
- Royal Thai Army Medical Department
- Sukha
- Sukhaphiban
- Health Intervention and Technology Assessment Program
