= 1976 Thai general election =

- 4 April 1976

All 279 seats in the House of Representatives 140 seats needed for a majority
- Registered: 20,623,430
- Turnout: 43.99% (▼3.19pp)
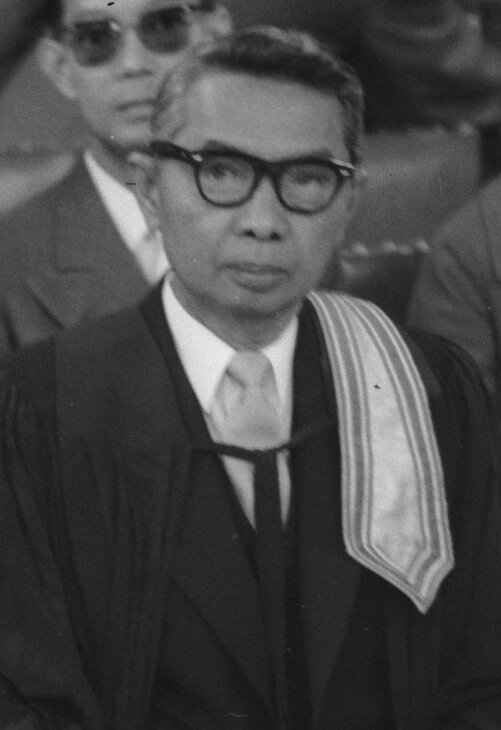

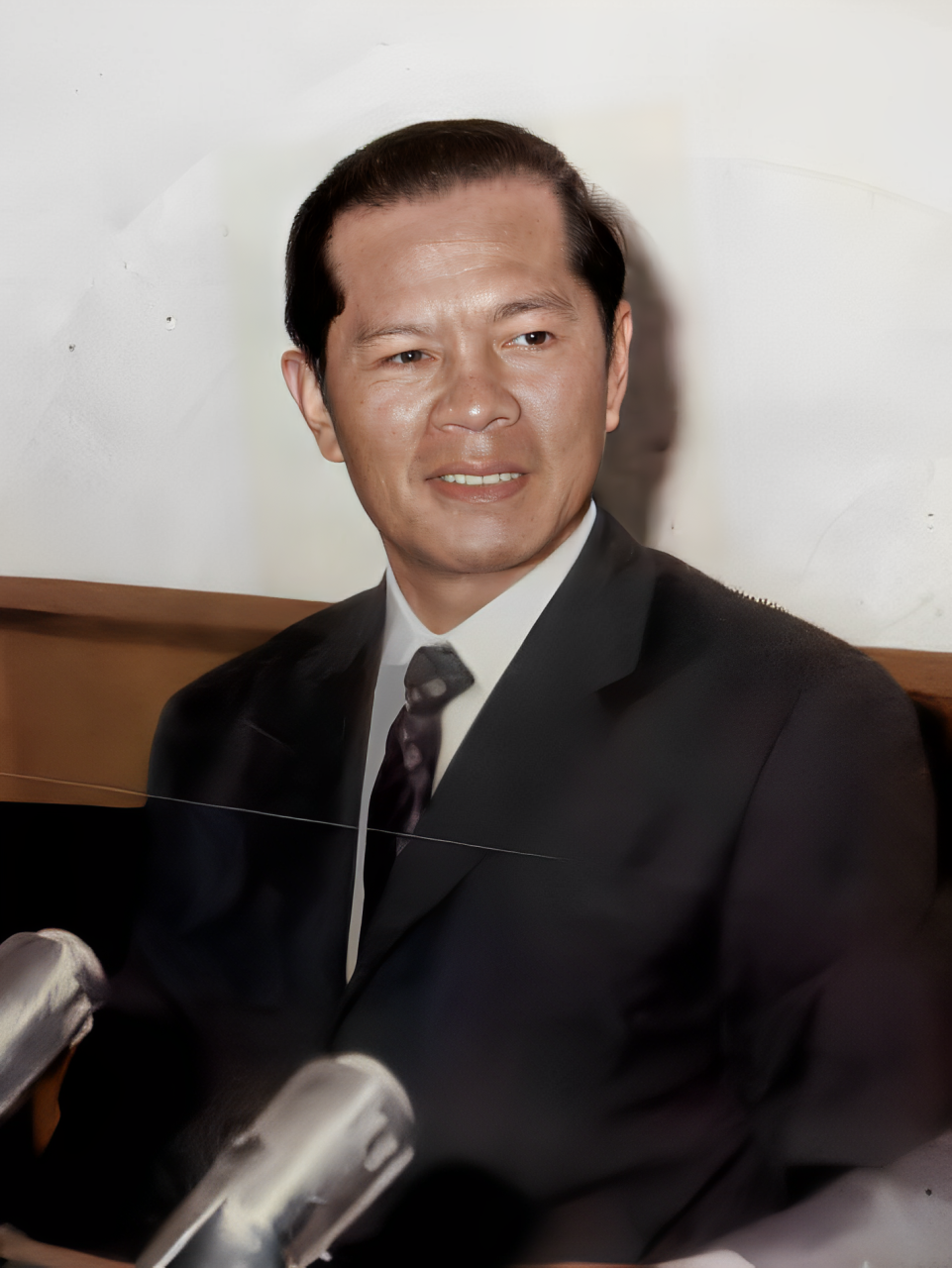

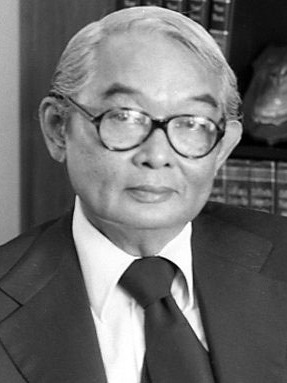

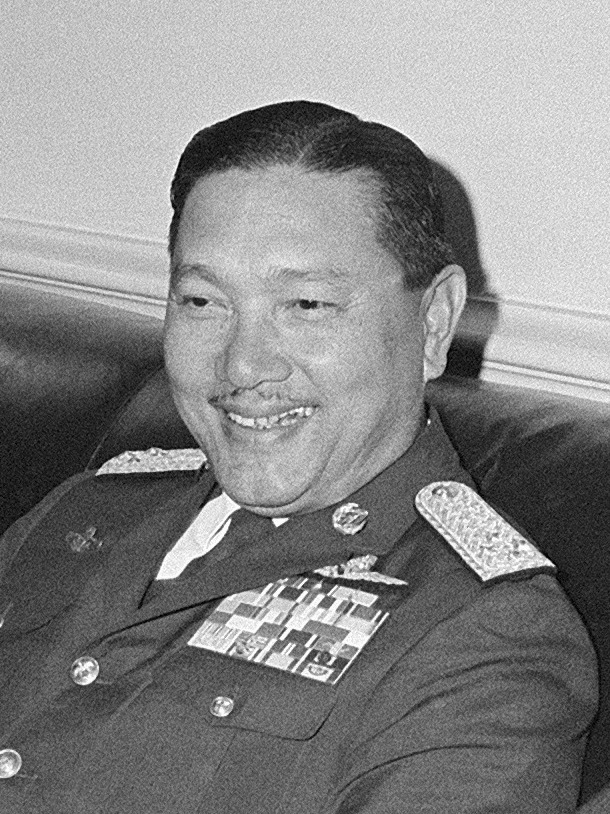

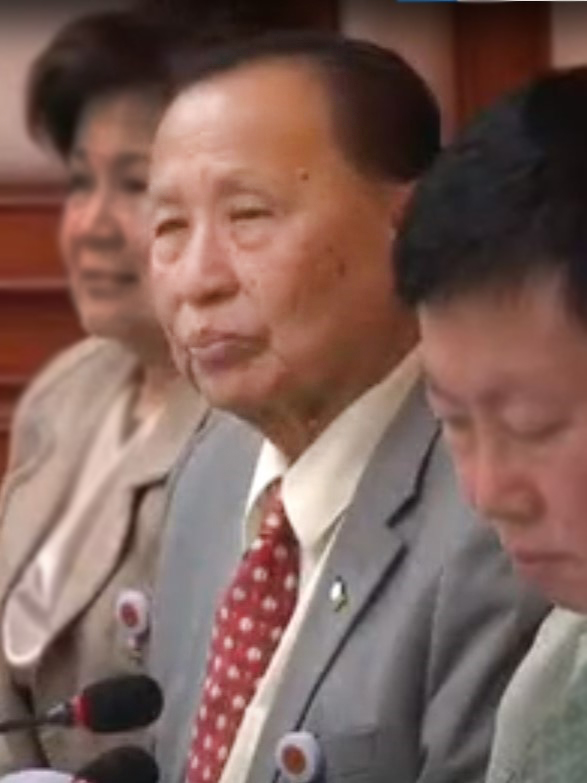
	First party	Second party	Third party
Leader	Seni Pramoj	Pramarn Adireksarn	Kukrit Pramoj
Party	Democrat	Chart Thai	Social Action
Last election	17.23%, 72 seats	12.05%, 28 seats	10.75%, 18 seats
Seats won	114	56	45
Seat change	▲42	▲28	▲27
Popular vote	4,745,990	3,280,134	3,272,170
Percentage	25.31%	17.49%	17.45%
Swing	▲8.08pp	▲5.44pp	▲6.70pp
	Fourth party	Fifth party	Sixth party
Leader	Dawee Chullasapya	Sewet Phiamphongsan	Prasit Kanchanawat
Party	Social Justice	Social Agrarian	Social Nationalist
Last election	14.48%, 45 seats	7.53%, 19 seats	7.05%, 16 seats
Seats won	28	9	8
Seat change	▼17	▼10	▼8
Popular vote	1,725,568	672,259	642,078
Percentage	9.20%	3.59%	3.42%
Swing	▼5.28pp	▼3.94pp	▼3.63pp
	Seventh party
Leader	Krasae Chanawongse
Party	New Force Party
Last election	6.04%, 12 seats
Seats won	3
Seat change	▼9
Popular vote	1,276,208
Percentage	6.81%
Swing	▲0.77pp
Prime Minister before election
Kukrit Pramoj
Social Action
Elected Prime Minister
Seni Pramoj
Democrat

Early general elections were held in Thailand on 4 April 1976 after the House of Representatives had been dissolved prematurely on 12 January. A total of 2,350 candidates representing 39 parties contested the election, although voter turnout was only 44%. The Democrat Party emerged as the largest party, winning 114 of the 279 seats.

== Results ==
Party	Votes	%	Seats	+/–
Democrat Party	4,745,990	25.31	114	+42
Thai Nation Party	3,280,134	17.49	56	+28
Social Action Party	3,272,170	17.45	45	+27
Social Justice Party	1,725,568	9.20	28	–17
New Force Party	1,276,208	6.81	3	–9
People's Force	746,985	3.98	3	+1
Social Agrarian Party	672,259	3.59	9	–10
Social Nationalist Party	642,078	3.42	8	–8
Socialist Party of Thailand	357,385	1.91	2	–13
Dharmacracy Party	264,526	1.41	1	New
Thai Protection Party	223,048	1.19	1	New
United Democratic Front	196,998	1.05	1	New
Socialist Front	174,432	0.93	1	–9
Labour Party	161,031	0.86	1	0
Social Thai Party	125,037	0.67	1	New
People's Peaceful Party	104,084	0.56	0	–8
Provincial Development Party	100,162	0.53	2	+1
Thai Party	98,487	0.53	0	–4
Free Force	95,056	0.51	0	New
National Reconstruction	79,894	0.43	0	–3
New Siam Party	72,664	0.39	1	New
Democracy	59,472	0.32	1	–1
Social Progress Party	25,028	0.13	1	New
Agriculturalist Party	24,987	0.13	0	–1
People Party	11,919	0.06	0	0
15 other parties	215,209	1.15	0	–
Total	18,750,811	100.00	279	+10
Valid votes	8,619,302	95.00		
Invalid/blank votes	453,327	5.00		
Total votes	9,072,629	100.00		
Registered voters/turnout	20,623,430	43.99		
Source: Nohlen et al.
