= Thawit Klinprathum =

Thai politician (1931–2006)

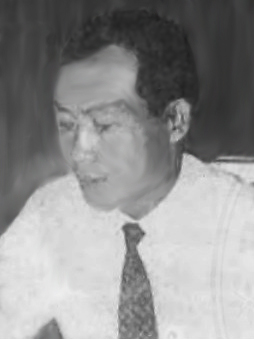
Thawit Klinprathum

Thawit Klinprathum (Thai: ทวิช กลิ่นประทุม, alternatively transcribed as Dewitt or Thavich Klinpratoom; 9 February 1931 – 26 July 2006) was a Thai politician. In the mid-1970s, he was the leader of the conservative and pro-military Social Justice Party. Thawit was an ally of the military rulers Thanom Kittikachorn and Praphas Charusathien who were deposed during the democratic uprising of October 1973. From March 1975 to February 1976, he was Deputy Prime Minister and Minister of Agriculture in the coalition government of M.R. Kukrit Pramoj.

During the government participation, Thawit developed a conflict with defence minister Pramarn Adireksarn of the Thai Nation Party, whom he attacked for manipulating the list of appointments of high-rank officers. Thawit, representing the interests of General Krit Srivara, alleged that Pramarn tried to dominate the armed forces, hinted that an irritated army could be tempted to revolt, and demanded Pramarn's dismissal. Thawit was dismissed after he criticised the prime minister outspokenly for dissolving the parliament and for the government's price guarantee on rice.

Before the elections in April 1976, he was replaced as Social Justice Party chairman by Air Marshal Dawee Chullasap, but took the post of secretary-general. In this election, Thawit was elected to parliament, after he had failed in the 1975 election. After 1976, the Social Justice Party fell into insignificance. Thawit Klinpratoom went on to represent the Thai Nation Party. From 1988 to 1990, he was Minister of University Affairs in the government of Chatichai Choonhavan. In 1998, he was fined 500 baht for assaulting a Democrat MP during a parliamentary debate.

Thawit is the father of former minister Sora-at Klinpratoom and the grandfather of actress Amy Klinpratoom. In 2005, at the age of 80, Thawit was ordered by a court to acknowledge his paternity of a 2-year-old boy, whose mother was 18 at the time of giving birth.
