= 1979 Thai general election =

- 22 April 1979

All 301 seats in the House of Representatives 151 seats needed for a majority
- Registered: 21,284,790
- Turnout: 43.90% (▼0.09pp)
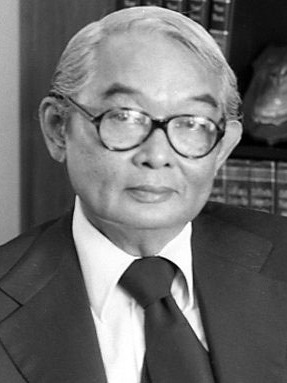

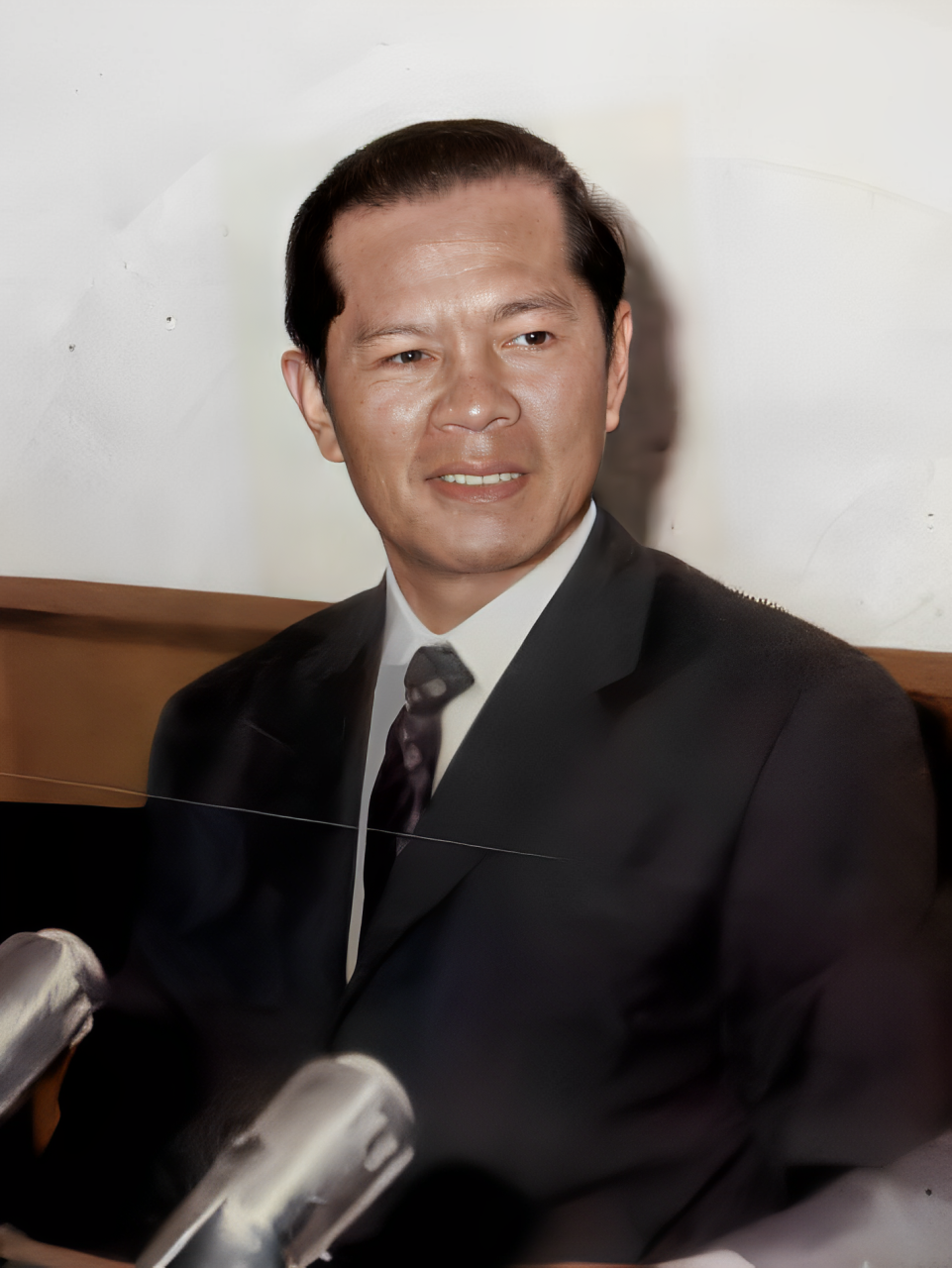

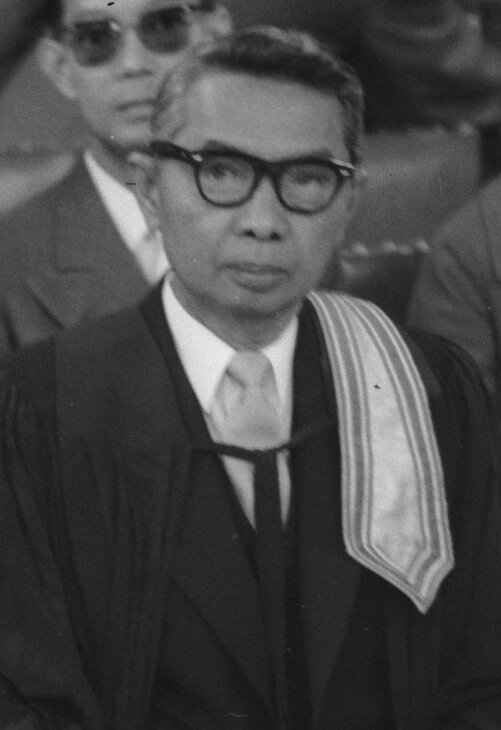

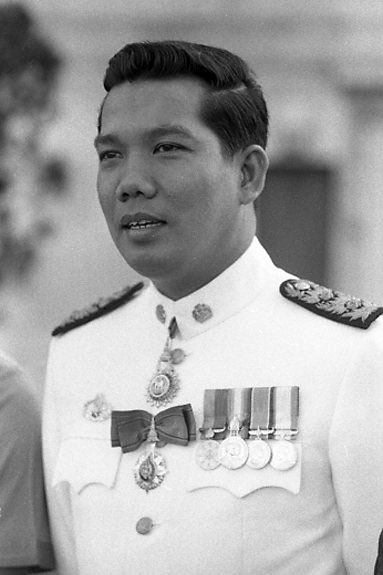
	First party	Second party
Leader	Kukrit Pramoj	Pramarn Adireksarn
Party	Social Action	Chart Thai
Last election	17.45%, 45 seats	17.49%, 56 seats
Seats won	82	38
Seat change	▲37	▼18
Popular vote	4,179,174	2,213,299
Percentage	21.26%	11.26%
Swing	▲3.81pp	▼6.23pp
	Third party	Fourth party
Leader	Seni Pramoj	Samak Sundaravej
Party	Democrat	Thai Citizen
Last election	25.31%, 114 seats	–
Seats won	33	32
Seat change	▼81	New
Popular vote	2,865,248	528,210
Percentage	14.57%	2.69%
Swing	▼10.74pp	New
Prime Minister before election
Kriangsak Chamanan
Independent
Elected Prime Minister
Kriangsak Chamanan
Independent

General elections were held in Thailand on 22 April 1979. The Social Action Party emerged as the largest party, winning 82 of the 301 seats. Voter turnout was 43.9%.

== Results ==
Party	Votes	%	Seats	+/–
Social Action Party	4,179,174	21.26	82	+37
Democrat Party	2,865,248	14.57	33	–81
Thai Nation Party	2,213,299	11.26	38	–18
Seritham Party	979,398	4.98	20	New
People's Nation Party	759,302	3.86	13	New
New Force Party	544,733	2.77	8	+5
Thai Citizen Party	528,210	2.69	32	New
Democratic Action	274,591	1.40	3	New
Social Agrarian Party	239,122	1.22	3	–6
Social Democratic Party	162,240	0.83	0	New
United Thai Party	119,046	0.61	0	New
Siam Reform Party	106,916	0.54	0	New
Supporting Kriangsak's Policy	94,425	0.48	0	New
Other parties	397,533	2.02	6	–
Independents	6,197,082	31.52	63	New
Total	19,660,319	100.00	301	+22
Valid votes	8,937,074	95.64		
Invalid/blank votes	406,971	4.36		
Total votes	9,344,045	100.00		
Registered voters/turnout	21,284,790	43.90		
Source: Nohlen et al.
