= Vichien Khaokham =

Thai politician

Vichien Khaokham (born 28 March 1956) is a Thai politician. He is a Member of Parliament for the Pheu Thai Party and member of United Front for Democracy Against Dictatorship. Vichien Khaokham was born in Ban Phue District, Udon Thani Province. He studied Rajabhat Maha sarakham University.

Vichien began his political career in the 1988 general elections, representing Udon Thani Province and the Thai Nation Party, National Development Party and Social Action Party. In the elections of 2007, He won elections in Udontani MP.

== Royal decorations ==
- 2011 - Order of the Crown of Thailand
