= Bunying Nanthaphiwat =

Thai politician

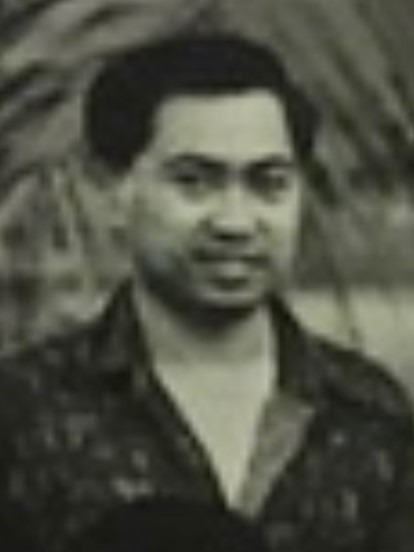
Bunying Nanthaphiwat

Bunying Nanthaphiwat (Thai: บุญยิ่ง นันทาภิวัฒน์) was a Thai politician. As of the 1970s he served as Deputy Minister attached to the Prime Minister's Office, Deputy Minister for Industry and Minister Attached to the Prime Minister's Office. He was one of the founders of the Seritham Party ahead of the 1979 election.
