= Booneua Prasertsuwan =

Thai politician (1919–2016)

- บุญเอื้อ ประเสริฐสุวรรณ

Speaker of the House of Representatives and President of the National Assembly of Thailand
- In office 11 July 1995 – 27 September 1996
- Monarch: Bhumibol Adulyadej
- Prime Minister: Chuan Leekpai; Banharn Silpa-archa
- Preceded by: Marut Bunnag
- Succeeded by: Wan Muhamad Noor Matha

Personal details
- Born: 13 April 1919 Bang Pla Ma, Suphan Buri, Siam
- Died: 13 October 2016 (aged 97) Siriraj Piyamaharajkarun Hospital, Bangkok, Thailand
- Party: Democrat (1957–1974); Social Justice (1975); Thai Nation (1975–1995)
- Spouse: Duangnet Prasertsuwan
- Children: Nathawut Prasertsuwan
- Education: Army Medical Field Service School
- Occupation: Politician; army officer; teacher

Military service
- Allegiance: Thailand
- Branch/service: Royal Thai Army
- Years of service: 1941–2016
- Rank: Major General
- Battles/wars: Pacific War

Booneua Prasertsuwan, also spelled Boon-eau Prasertsuwan, (Thai: บุญเอื้อ ประเสริฐสุวรรณ; 13 April 1919 – 13 October 2016) was a Thai politician from Suphan Buri Province. Prasertsuwan was first elected to the national House of Representatives in 1957 and won election to the House for 10 consecutive elections from 1957 to 1996. He served as Speaker of the House of Representatives of Thailand from 1995 to 1996. He is credited with persuading Banharn Silpa-archa, the former Prime Minister of Thailand from 1995 to 1996, to enter politics.

== Early life and education ==
Prasertsuwan was born in Bang Pla Ma District, Suphan Buri Province, on 13 April 1919, to parents, Chuang (mother) and Lang (father) Suwanhong. In 1937, he became a teacher at the Kannasut Sueksalai in his native Suphan Buri Province. He later completed his studies at military medical school and became a Thai Army sergeant. Following the end of World War II, Prasertsuwan became a medical instructor at the Ananda Mahidol Hospital in Lopburi before resigning from his position in 1946 to open a family-run medical clinic.

Prasertsuwan was married to Duangnet Prasertsuwan; the couple had one son, Nathawut Prasertsuwan, a politician and former MP for Suphan Buri Province.

== Political careers ==
Prasertsuwan entered politics at the local, provincial level. He was elected to the Suphan Buri provincial council, representing Bang Pla Ma district, four times.

In 1957, he was elected to the House of Representatives of Thailand. He won election to the House of Representatives in ten elections from 1957 to 1996. In 1975, Prasertsuwan joined the Democrat Party, but later switched to the Thamsangkhom and the now defunct Thai Nation Party (or Chart Thai Party).

In 1981, Prasertsuwan was appointed Deputy Agriculture and Cooperative Minister in a government of Prime Minister Prem Tinsulanonda to replace the late Pol Col Krit Sangkhasap, who had died in a 1981 helicopter accident in Chiang Mai while in office. Chatichai Choonhavan, the Prime Minister from 1988 to 1991, also appointed Prasertsuwan as his Office Minister and Deputy Prime Minister during his government.

Prasertsuwan was elected Speaker of the House of Representatives of Thailand in 1995, a position he held until September 1996.

In 1997, he was named to the rank of major general in a special case.

== Death ==
Booneua Prasertsuwan, who was 97 years old, died at Siriraj Hospital in Bangkok on 13 October 2016, the same day as the passing of the King of Thailand, Bhumibol Adulyadej.

== Royal decorations ==
Booneua has received the following royal decorations in the Honours System of Thailand:

- Knight Grand Cordon (Special Class) of the Most Exalted Order of the White Elephant
- Knight Grand Cordon (Special Class) of The Most Noble Order of the Crown of Thailand
