= Boonsanong Punyodyana =

Thai politician

- บุญสนอง บุณโยทยาน
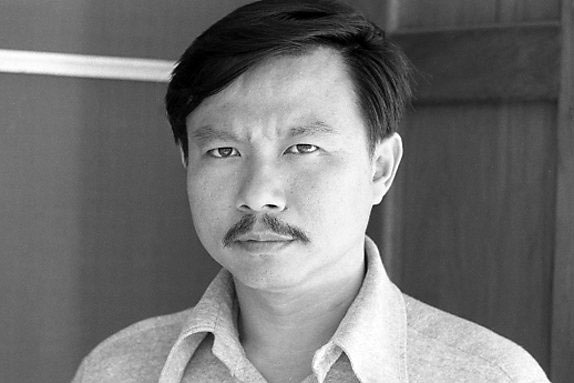
- Boonsanong Punyodyana in 1974

General Secretary of the Socialist Party of Thailand
- In office 1974–1976
- Preceded by: Office established
- Succeeded by: Chamni Sakdiset

Personal details
- Born: 31 December 1936 Chiang Rai, Thailand
- Died: 28 February 1976 (aged 39) Bangkok, Thailand
- Cause of death: Assassination (gunshot)
- Party: Socialist Party of Thailand
- Spouse: Tassanee Punyodyana
- Children: 2
- Education: Prince Royal's College; Chulalongkorn University; University of Kansas; Cornell University

Boonsanong Punyodyana (Thai: บุญสนอง บุณโยทยาน; RTGS: Bunsanong Bunyothayan) was a Thai professor and politician who was the founder and General Secretary of the Socialist Party of Thailand. He was assassinated on February 28, 1976.

== Life and career ==
Born in 1936 in Chiang Rai, he received early education at the Prince Royal's College in Chiang Mai. After graduating from Chulalongkorn University in 1959, Boonsanong worked for the Thai government, preparing English translations of official manuals. His skill in English and his familiarity with the Thai governmental structure gained him employment with the United States Information Service (USIS) in Bangkok as a writer and researcher. In 1962, he won a Fulbright-Hayes Scholarship to study for a master's degree in sociology at the University of Kansas. After receiving the MA, Boonsanong returned to Thailand where he joined the staff of Thammasat University as a lecturer in sociology. In 1967 he returned to the US and spent five productive years there. He completed a PhD in sociology at Cornell University, published several articles, spent a year at Harvard University, and another year as a visiting professor at the University of Hawaiʻi.

Boonsanong had established himself as an internationally recognized scholar in his field by the time of his return to Thailand in 1972. Back at Thammasat University in June 1972, he immediately became one of the university's leading activists. He led student demonstrations at the US Embassy in Bangkok following the Mayaguez incident. He was heavily engaged: writing papers, attending meetings, carrying out research, organizing and lecturing to hundreds of committed young people. The student movement which was to overthrow the military dictatorship in the 1973 Thai popular uprising was heating up and Thammasat was at its epicenter.

== Works ==
- See "BIBLIOGRAPHY OF WORKS BY BOONSANONG PUNYODYANA"
- Punyodyana, Boonsanong (March 1971). Chinese-Thai differential assimilation in Bangkok: an exploratory study (Cornell Thailand Project: Interim Report Series: Number 13. Data Paper: Number 79.). Ithaca: Southeast Asia Program, Department. of Far Eastern Studies, Cornell University.

== Assassination ==
Boonsanong was killed by gunshot at about 01:30 on 28 February 1976. At the time of his death, he was the Secretary-General of the Socialist Party of Thailand. It is thought that his death was politically motivated. His murderers were not apprehended. He was survived by his wife and two daughters.
