= Krisana Kraisintu =

Thai pharmacist

- Born: 1952 (age 73–74)
- Occupation: Pharmacist

Krisana Kraisintu (Thai: กฤษณา ไกรสินธุ์, RTGS: Kritsana Kraisin, pronounced [krìt.sā.nǎː krāj.sǐn]) is a Thai professor and pharmacist, as known as the "Gypsy pharmacist". She was pharmaceutical consultant in the local production and increased access to life-saving medicines in Africa, in particular, malaria and HIV/AIDS-related drug production.

She was formerly Director of Research and Development Institute of the Government Pharmaceutical Organization (GPO), Ministry of Public Health, Thailand. Between 2002 and 2007 Kraisintu worked as a pharmaceutical consultant for Action Medeor, a German aid organization dealing with the production and distribution of medicines in Africa.

Kraisintu is the Honorary Dean of the Faculty of Oriental Medicines, Rangsit University, and a visiting professor at the Faculty of Pharmaceutical Sciences, Ubon Ratchathani University, Thailand. She is also a visiting professor of oriental medicines at the Harbin Institute of Technology, China.

In 2009, she was given the Ramon Magsaysay Award.

== HIV/AIDS drugs ==
Krisana conducted research on anti-retroviral drugs without much support and successfully formulated a generic version of zidovudine (AZT), which treats HIV and reduces the risk of mother-to-child transmission, in 1995. The product was introduced to the market at a fraction of the cost of the branded product. Her achievement raised the pharmaceutical and health profile of Thailand as the first developing country to manufacture generic HIV/AIDS drugs.

== Education ==
Kraisintu earned her bachelor's degree in pharmacy from Chiang Mai University, Thailand in 1975; a MSc in pharmaceutical analysis from Strathclyde University in 1978; and a PhD in pharmaceutical chemistry from the University of Bath in 1981. She was also awarded an Honorary DSc (Doctor of Science) from the University of Bath in 2009.

She has worked in the pharmaceutical industry in various roles of quality assurance, manufacturing, research and development and business development for the discovery, development, and commercialization of chemical and natural pharmaceutical products.

== Honors ==
Year	Award
2009	Ramon Magsaysay Award, Ramon Magsaysay Award Foundation, Philippines.
2009	Honorary Pharmacist, Hospital Pharmacists' Society of Thailand.
2009	Citizen Hero Award, Sanya Thammasak Institute for Democracy, Thammasat University, Thailand.
2008	An outstanding individual of Thailand in the field of Social Development, The Prime Minister's Office, Thailand.
2008	Asian of the Year 2008, Reader’s Digest Magazine.
2007	Speaker for the Chancellor's Distinguished Lectureship Series, (Louisiana State University lecture series)
2005	Reminders Day AIDS Award, (ReD Awards), Berlin, Germany.
2004	Global Scientific Award, The Letten Foundation, for outstanding scientific contribution in the field of HIV/AIDS, Norway.
2001	Gold Medal, Eureka 50th World Exhibition of Innovation, Research and New Technology, Brussels, Belgium.
