= Labour Party (Thailand) =

Labour Party พรรคแรงงาน
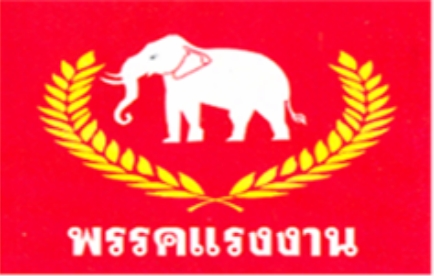
- Founded: December 23, 1968
- Dissolved: 19 November 1971
- Headquarters: Thailand
- Ideology: Social democracy
- Political position: Centre-left

Labour Party was a political party in Thailand.

== History ==
=== Labour Party (1968–1971) ===
The Labour Party was founded on December 23, 1968 by Kan Chueakeaw as leader and Weera Thanomkiang as secretary-general. On February 10, 1969, the Labour Party lost in election.

=== Labour Party (1974–1976) ===
The Labour Party was founded on November 21, 1974. by Seri Suchatapakan as leader and Sa-ard Piyawan as secretary-general. The party won 1 seat in the April 4, 1976 election.

== General election results ==
Election	Total seats won	Total votes	Share of votes	Outcome of election	Election leader
1969	0 / 219				Kan Chueakeaw
1975	0 / 269	136,783	0.7%		Seri Suchatapakan
1976	1 / 279	161,031	0.9%	▲1 seats	Seri Suchatapakan
