= New Force Party =

New Force Party พรรคพลังใหม่
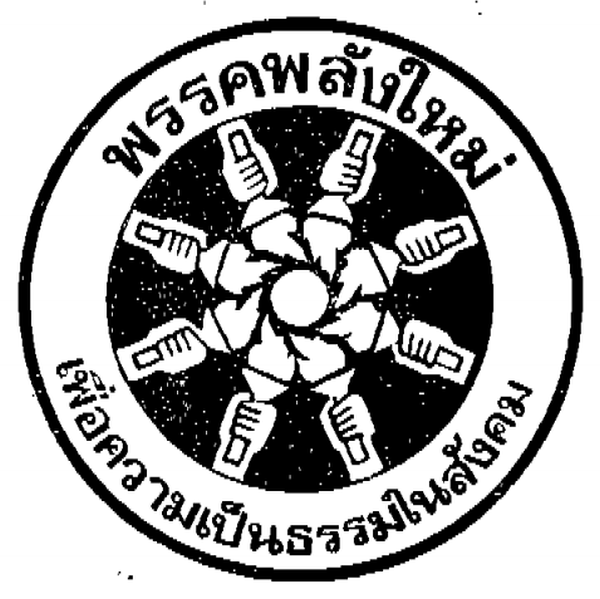
- Leader: Krasae Chanawongse
- Secretary-General: Pramote Nakhontap; Suthep Wongkamhaeng
- Founded: 21 September 1974
- Dissolved: 26 March 1988
- Headquarters: Dusit, Bangkok
- Ideology: Liberalism; Progressivism
- Political position: Centre-left

The New Force Party (Thai: พรรคพลังใหม่, RTGS: Phak Phalang Mai) was a political party in Thailand. It was founded in 1974, following the successful democratic uprising of October 1973. The New Force Party was one of the more successful left-wing parties during the relatively progressive and democratic phase from 1974 to 1976.

Progressive liberal and reformist in its stances, it was considered more moderate than the Socialist Party of Thailand. In the 1975 general election, the first free election after long military dictatorship, the party won 6.0% of the votes and 12 of 269 seats in the House of Representatives. The new leftist parties, together with the long-standing liberal Democrat Party, were placed on the opposition benches.

In the run-up to the 1976 election, the party was harassed by its right-wing adversaries. The party's office was attacked and candidates were assassinated by the far-right and military-backed Red Gaurs paramilitary. Its right-wing opponents accused the New Force Party of siding with the communists in Vietnam and Laos, of having received 152 million baht from the KGB, and of having leaders of Vietnamese descent. The party could stabilize its share of the votes at 6.8%, but only three of its candidates were successful in their respective constituencies.

After the democracy movement was shattered in the Thammasat University massacre on 6 October 1976, the role of the New Force Party was gradually diminished to a tiny splinter party. In the 1979 election, it won 2.8% of votes and 8 of 301 seats (mostly representing constituencies in Northeastern Thailand). After the 1983 election, New Force was extraparliamentary, after 1986 it held a sole seat in parliament. The party was replaced by the "Social Democratic Force Party" on 26 March 1988, which remained electorally unsuccessful.

The party was founded and led by medicine professor Dr. Krasae Chanawongse, the recipient of the 1973 Ramon Magsaysay Award for Community Leadership. In 1988, Krasae joined the Palang Dharma Party, and became foreign minister in 1995. Its secretary-general was Pramote Nakhontap, a political science professor, who later became an activist of the People's Alliance for Democracy ("Yellow Shirts") and authored an article about the alleged Finland Plot. Popular singer Suthep Wongkamhaeng was the party's secretary-general during the 1980s.
