= Government Pharmaceutical Organization =

State enterprise of Thailand

- องค์การเภสัชกรรม

State enterprise overview
- Preceding State enterprise: Government Pharmaceutical Laboratory
- Headquarters: Ratchathewi, Bangkok, Thailand; 13.7668°N 100.5285°E
- Employees: 2,812
- State enterprise executives: Doctor Opas Karnkawinpong, Chairman; Taweesin Visanuyothin, Board
- Parent department: Ministry of Public Health
- Website: Official website

The Government Pharmaceutical Organization (GPO) (Thai: องค์การเภสัชกรรม; RTGS: Ongkan Phesatchakam) is a Thai state enterprise which manufactures pharmaceutical products in Thailand. In 2011, the GPO netted a profit of 1.6 billion baht from the sale of pharmaceuticals and medical equipment. As of 2011, the GPO employed 2,812 persons. In 2016, the organization produced drugs at two government-owned factories.

GPO makes and sells four categories of products: medicines; antiretrovirals; chemicals/test kits/natural products; and preventive medicines. Besides Thailand, it markets its products in Nigeria, Ghana, Bhutan, Somalia, Myanmar, Sri Lanka, Malaysia, Cambodia, and Vietnam.

The GPO gives Thailand significant leverage in its price negotiations with foreign drug suppliers.

As of 2018, GPO's chairman is Dr Sopon Mekthon, who took over from Dr Nopporn Cheanklin.

== Missions ==
GPO's mission statement contains four objectives. One of them is to "To maintain price level of pharmaceutical products and medical supplies necessary for the Thai society to ensure people's accessibility." As an example, GPO will produce the antiretroviral drug efavirenz after receiving WHO approval. GPO's product costs 180 baht per bottle of thirty 600 mg tablets. The imported version retails for more than 1,000 baht per bottle. GPO will devote 2.5 percent of its manufacturing capacity to make 42 million efavirenz pills in 2018, allowing it to serve export markets as well as domestic. The Philippines alone will order about 300,000 bottles of efavirenz for 51 million baht.

== Compulsory licensing ==
The GPO is permitted to produce efavirenz and two other patented medications by having sought compulsory licensing (CL) under the provisions of the WTO agreement on intellectual property, the Agreement on Trade-Related Aspects of Intellectual Property Rights (TRIPs). Under a compulsory license, an individual or company seeking to use another's intellectual property can do so—for good reasons—without seeking the rights holder's consent, and paying the rights holder a set fee for the license. This is an exception to the general rule under intellectual property laws that the intellectual property owner enjoys exclusive rights that it may license—or decline to license—to others. In the case of efavirenz, the patent owner, Merck, and the US Trade Representative, for years fiercely resisted allowing the GPO to produce the drug.

== Products ==
=== Sidegra ===
- Sidegra (Sildenafil) in 50 and 100 mg tablets.

=== Medical marijuana ===
GPO produces cannabinoid medicines at its factory in Pathum Thani Province, where it also grows cannabis plants. The organisation is also seeking approval to build a three billion baht, 1,500-rai (240 ha; 590-acre), herb and marijuana facility in Chonburi Province.

The GPO led an effort to convince the military government to approve marijuana research so that the GPO can market it for medical use. The move would make Thailand the first country in Asia to legalize medical cannabis. Dr. Nopporn Cheanklin, managing director of the GPO, said that, "The best strains of cannabis in the world 20 years ago were from Thailand, and now Canada has developed this strain..., we can't claim that ours is the best in the world anymore,...That's why we must develop our strain to...compete with theirs." The government's cabinet of ministers in May 2018 gave the green light to amend the country's drug laws to allow research on medicinal marijuana. The bill is currently being debated in the National Legislative Assembly. Current Thai laws are tough on both the sale and use of marijuana. Possession of cannabis in Thailand could land its owner in jail for up to 15 years as the plant is a category-5 narcotic drug along with psychoactive mushrooms and kratom, a psychoactive plant similar to opiates that is native to Thailand. A researcher at Chulalongkorn University has pointed out that Thailand has 200,000 Alzheimer's patients and 150,000 Parkinson's patients who could benefit from medical marijuana.

== See also ==
- Health in Thailand
- Krisana Kraisintu
- Ministry of Public Health (Thailand)
