= Bunsom Martin =

Doctor and university professor

- บุญสม มาร์ติน
- Born: 19 September 1922; Lampang, Thailand
- Died: 9 June 2008 (aged 85); Bangkok, Thailand
- Occupation: Physician
- Known for: Pioneering physical education in Thailand
- Office: Minister of Education; Minister of Public Health; Chiang Mai University President
- Spouse: Angsana Martin

Bunsom Martin (Thai: บุญสม มาร์ติน, pronounced [būn.sǒm], 19 September 1922 – 9 June 2008) was a Thai medical doctor and university professor who pioneered the establishment of physical education in Thailand. He served as Minister of Education, Minister of Public Health, and President of Chiang Mai University.

He also served as a member of the World Scout Committee and in 1990 was awarded the 209th Bronze Wolf, the only distinction of the World Organization of the Scout Movement, awarded by the World Scout Committee for exceptional services to world Scouting.
