= Social Democratic Party (Thailand) =

Social Democratic Party พรรคสังคมประชาธิปไตย
- Chairman: Suthep Sutchakhun
- Founded: 24 November 1955
- Dissolved: 20 October 1958
- Headquarters: Bangkok

The Social Democratic Party was a political party in Thailand which emerged during the 1950s. It was led Suthep Sutchakhun. It called for economic justice, on the basis of political democracy. Suthep sought to combine Buddhist and Christian ideas, and the party was void of Marxist influence and did not elaborate on theories of class.
