= Social Justice Party (Thailand) =

Defunct political party in Thailand

Social Justice Party พรรคธรรมสังคม
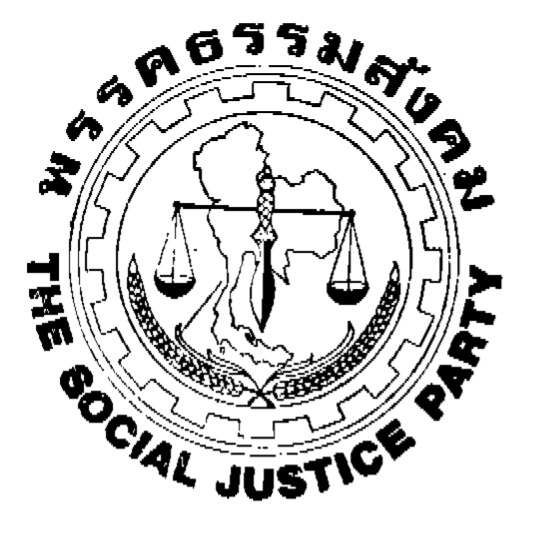
- Leader: Thawit Klinprathum
- Founded: 20 November 1974
- Dissolved: 1976
- Preceded by: United Thai People's Party
- Headquarters: Bangkok
- Ideology: Conservatism
- Political position: Right-wing

The Social Justice Party (Thai: พรรคธรรมสังคม, RTGS: Phak Tham Sangkhom) was a political party in Thailand. It existed in the short phase after the democratic uprising in 1973 until 1976. Although not having a strong ideological orientation, it was mostly considered conservative and right-wing. The party had strong backing from circles inside the military, and represented the interests of General Krit Srivara and Air Marshal Dawee Chullasap. It was led by Thawit Klinprathum, who was close to former military dictators Thanom Kittikachorn and Praphas Charusathien.

The party was one of the main parties in the parliamentary elections of 1975 and 1976. In 1975 it won 45 of the 269 seats, making it the second-strongest party. Most of the elected representatives came from the Northeastern and Central regions. In March 1975, two months after the elections, the party joined the "United Parties coalition" with the Social Action Party, the Thai Nation Party, and four minor parties under the premiership of Kukrit Pramoj. Party leader Thawit Klinprathum became agriculture minister. The coalition broke in January 1976, partly due to the social unrest in the country, and partly due to quarrels inside the coalition, mainly between Social Justice and Thai Nation parties.

Before the following snap election, Dawee Chullasap replaced Thawit Klinprathum as party chairman. In the election, the Social Justice Party lost 17 of its seats and became only the fourth force in parliament. However, it could again join a coalition government, this time led by the Democrat Party of Seni Pramoj. The government was toppled by a military coup d'état on 6 October 1976, after the Thammasat University massacre. Afterwards, the Social Justice Party disappeared from the Thai political landscape.
