= Socialist Party of Thailand =

Defunct political party in Thailand

Socialist Party of Thailand พรรคสังคมนิยมแห่งประเทศไทย
- Leader: Somkid Srisangkom
- Secretary-General: Boonsanong Punyodyana
- Founded: 1974
- Dissolved: 1976
- Ideology: Socialism
- Political position: Left-wing

Party flag

The Socialist Party of Thailand (SPT) was a political party in Thailand, active in the 1970s. SPT was led by its general secretary Boonsanong Punyodyana.

SPT won 15 out of 269 seats in the 1975 parliamentary elections. That election, which was the first free polls after many years of dictatorship, also saw other left-wing parties like the New Force Party (12 seats) and Socialist Front (10 seats) represented in Parliament.

Boonsanong Punyodyana was murdered on 28 February 1976. Around 10,000 people attended his memorial service.

After the Thammasat University massacre and military coup on 6 October 1976, many SPT cadres went into exile or joined the Communist Party of Thailand's guerrillas in the border areas with Laos in northern Thailand and Isan (northeastern Thailand).

Thus the party was dissolved at the order of the military junta’s National Administrative Reform Council leader Sangad Chaloryu on 6 October 1976.
