= Pramarn Adireksarn =

Thai military officer and politician

- ประมาณ อดิเรกสาร
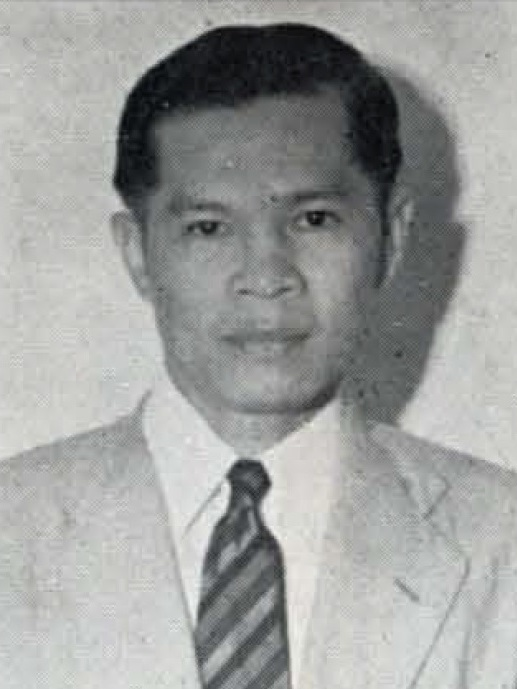

Leader of the Opposition
- In office 30 September 1992 – 7 May 1994
- Prime Minister: Chuan Leekpai
- Preceded by: Chavalit Yongchaiyudh
- Succeeded by: Banharn Silpa-archa
- In office 24 May 1983 – 1 May 1986
- Prime Minister: Prem Tinsulanonda
- Preceded by: Samak Sundaravej
- Succeeded by: Pol Rengprasertwit

Deputy Prime Minister of Thailand
- In office 3 March 1980 – 19 March 1983
- Prime Minister: Prem Tinsulanonda
- In office 20 April 1976 – 6 October 1976
- Prime Minister: Seni Pramoj
- In office 14 March 1975 – 12 January 1976
- Prime Minister: Kukrit Pramoj

Minister of Interior
- In office 14 December 1990 – 23 February 1991
- Prime Minister: Chatichai Choonhavan
- Preceded by: Banharn Silpa-archa
- Succeeded by: Isarapong Noonpakdee
- In office 9 August 1988 – 9 January 1990
- Preceded by: Prachuab Soontarangkul
- Succeeded by: Banharn Silpa-archa

Minister of Industry
- In office 9 January 1990 – 14 December 1990
- Prime Minister: Chatichai Choonhavan
- Preceded by: Banharn Silpa-archa
- Succeeded by: Pramual Sabhavasu

Minister of Agriculture and Cooperatives
- In office 20 April 1976 – 6 October 1976
- Prime Minister: Seni Pramoj
- Preceded by: Thawit Klinprathum
- Succeeded by: Intree Chantarasatit

Minister of Defence
- In office 17 March 1975 – 12 January 1976
- Prime Minister: Kukrit Pramoj
- Preceded by: Tawich Seneewong
- Succeeded by: Kris Sivara

Personal details
- Born: 31 December 1913 Saraburi, Siam
- Died: 20 August 2010 (aged 96) Bangkok, Thailand
- Party: Thai Nation Party
- Spouse: Thanpuying Charoen Choonhavan
- Children: Pongpol Adireksarn
- Education: Chulachomklao Royal Military Academy
- Profession: Military officer; politician

Military service
- Allegiance: Thailand
- Branch/service: Royal Thai Army; Royal Thai Police; Volunteer Defense Corps
- Years of service: 1934 - 1951
- Rank: General; Police General; VDC Gen.
- Battles/wars: Boworadet Rebellion; Franco-Thai War; Burma campaign

Pramarn Adireksarn (Thai: ประมาณ อดิเรกสาร, RTGS: Praman Adireksan, 31 December 1913 – 20 August 2010) was a Thai military officer and politician. He was a co-founder and chairman of the Thai Nation Party, deputy prime minister and minister in several cabinets.

== Early life, military career, and family ==
Pramarn Adireksarn was born on 31 December 1913 in Saraburi to a Chinese immigrant father and Thai mother. He attended the Chulachomklao Royal Military Academy and became an officer in the artillery of the Royal Thai Army in Lopburi. The highest rank he achieved was Major General. Pramarn married Charoen Choonhavan, the daughter of Field Marshal Phin Choonhavan and sister of Chatichai Choonhavan. By this marriage, he became a member of the influential "Rajakru clan". Pramarn and Charoen Adireksarn had three sons, including the author and politician Pongpol Adireksarn (pen-name Paul Adirex).

== Political career under Plaek Phibunsongkhram ==
Later he served as director of the state-run Express Transportation Organization of Thailand (ETO). In 1951, he became deputy minister in the cabinet of Field Marshal Plaek Phibunsongkhram, initially assigned to the ministry of transport, he changed to the interior ministry in 1952, and to the ministry of industry in 1953. In 1955, he left the government. In 1957, Pramarn was elected Member of Parliament for the ruling Seri Manangkasila Party, the winner of the election in February of that year. Subsequently, Prime Minister Plaek appointed him Minister of Industry. The 1957 military coup d'état by Field Marshal Sarit Thanarat deposed Pramarn's patron Plaek and brought his political career to a temporary halt. He got involved in the private sector and established a textile concern.

== Thai Nation Party leader ==
In 1974, after the successful democratic uprising, Pramarn, together with his in-laws Chatichai Choonhavan and Siri Siriyothin, founded the Thai Nation Party. The right-wing conservative and staunchly anti-communist party was the adversary of the leftist student movement. In March 1975, Pramarn led the Thai Nation Party into a United Parties coalition with the progressive Social Action Party and the right-wing Social Justice Party with M.R. Kukrit Pramoj becoming prime minister and Pramarn taking the office of deputy prime minister and minister of defence. The coalition broke in January 1976. It had not been able to cope with the social unrest in the country, including the protests of the students movement, strikes, and fear at the sight of the events in Vietnam, Laos and Cambodia, and inter-party conflicts, namely between Pramarn and Thawit Klinprathum, the leader of the Social Justice Party.

In advance of the snap elections, Pramarn's Thai Nation Party campaigned on the slogan "Right kill Left". The party could significantly increase its share of votes and seats in parliament. This time, the Thai Nation Party joined a Democrat Party-led government under Kukrit's brother M.R. Seni Pramoj. Pramarn Adireksarn stayed Deputy Prime Minister, but was denied the defence portfolio. Instead, he was given the ministry of agriculture. In the morning of 6 October 1976, it was Pramarn who declared in a cabinet meeting that it was the right moment to destroy the student movement. This was eventually executed by the police and ultra-right paramilitary units who shot and struck at least 46 protesters at the Thammasat University dead. On the evening of the same day, the military launched a coup d'état and deposed the Seni government.

=== After 1976 ===
In 1978, Pramarn became official leader of the opposition, before Thai Nation joined the coalition government of General Prem Tinsulanonda in 1980, with Pramarn again becoming Deputy Prime Minister. In 1986, Pramarn passed the leadership of the Thai Nation Party to his brother-in-law Chatichai Choonhavan. Chatichai won the election of 1988, became Prime Minister and made Pramarn Minister of Interior. In this position, he was royally promoted to the honorary rank of police general. In January 1990 he switched posts with fellow party member Banharn Silpa-archa and took over the industry portfolio, just to change back to the interior ministry in December of the same year. Chatichai however took on leading circles in the military and was deposed by a coup in 1991. The so-called National Peace Keeping Council seized 139 million baht of Pramarn's assets, accusing him of being "unusually rich" for a cabinet member. From 1992 to 1994 Pramarn once again assumed the leadership of the Thai Nation Party and acted as leader of the opposition. Afterwards, Pramarn retired from the political scene and passed the mantle to his son Pongpol Adireksarn.

Pramarn Adireksarn died of a blood infection at the age of 96 on 20 August 2010.

== Quote ==
In politics, there is no such thing as a true friend and permanent foe.

— Pramarn Adireksarn
