= Dawee Chullasapya =

Thai Air Force air marshal (1914–1996)

- ทวี จุลละทรัพย์
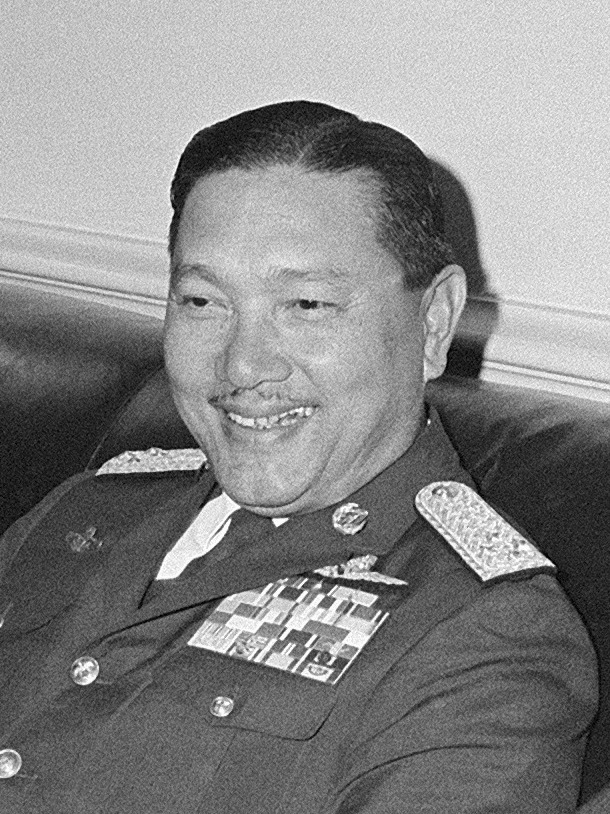
- ACM Dawee Chullasapya in 1965

Deputy Prime Minister of Thailand
- In office 12 May 1979 – 3 March 1980
- Prime Minister: Kriangsak Chomanan
- In office 20 April 1976 – 6 October 1976
- Prime Minister: Seni Pramoj

Minister of Defence
- In office 14 October 1973 – 22 May 1974
- Prime Minister: Sanya Dharmasakti
- Preceded by: Thanom Kittikachorn
- Succeeded by: Kruyn Sutathanin

Supreme Commander of the Armed Forces
- In office 1 October 1973 – 30 September 1974
- Preceded by: Thanom Kittikachorn
- Succeeded by: Kris Sivara

Personal details
- Born: 8 August 1914 Thonburi, Siam
- Died: 18 May 1996 (aged 81) Bangkok, Thailand
- Party: Social Justice Party
- Other political affiliations: United Thai People's Party; Free Thai Movement
- Spouse: Aree Pinsang
- Known for: Member of the International Olympic Committee

Military service
- Allegiance: Thailand
- Branch/service: Royal Thai Air Force
- Rank: General; Admiral; Air chief marshal
- Commands: Supreme Commander of the Armed Forces HQ

Dawee Chullasapya or Chullasap (Thai: ทวี จุลละทรัพย์, RTGS: Thawi Chunlasap, Thai pronunciation: [tʰáwiː t͡ɕunlásàp], 8 August 1914 – 18 May 1996) was a Royal Thai Air Force officer, and a member of the Seri Thai.

Air chief marshal Dawee was widely considered a pillar of Thailand's sporting world. After a successful career in the military which saw him rise to Supreme Command chief of staff in 1961, he turned to politics and was appointed deputy defense minister in 1963. He later served as minister of transport and communications and of agriculture. Head of Thailand's National Olympic Committee for 22 years until his death, he was a member of the International Olympic Committee and a force behind the Southeast Asian Games. Dawee himself won a silver medal in sailing at the 1970 Asian Games.

After the October 1973 Thai popular uprising he served as defence minister and Supreme Commander of the Armed Forces Headquarters until 1974. In 1976 and 1979/80 he was again deputy prime minister of Thailand.

== Education ==
He became a cadet at the Army Academy upon finishing secondary school, and graduated with the rank of 2nd Lieutenant in 1935.

== Early career ==
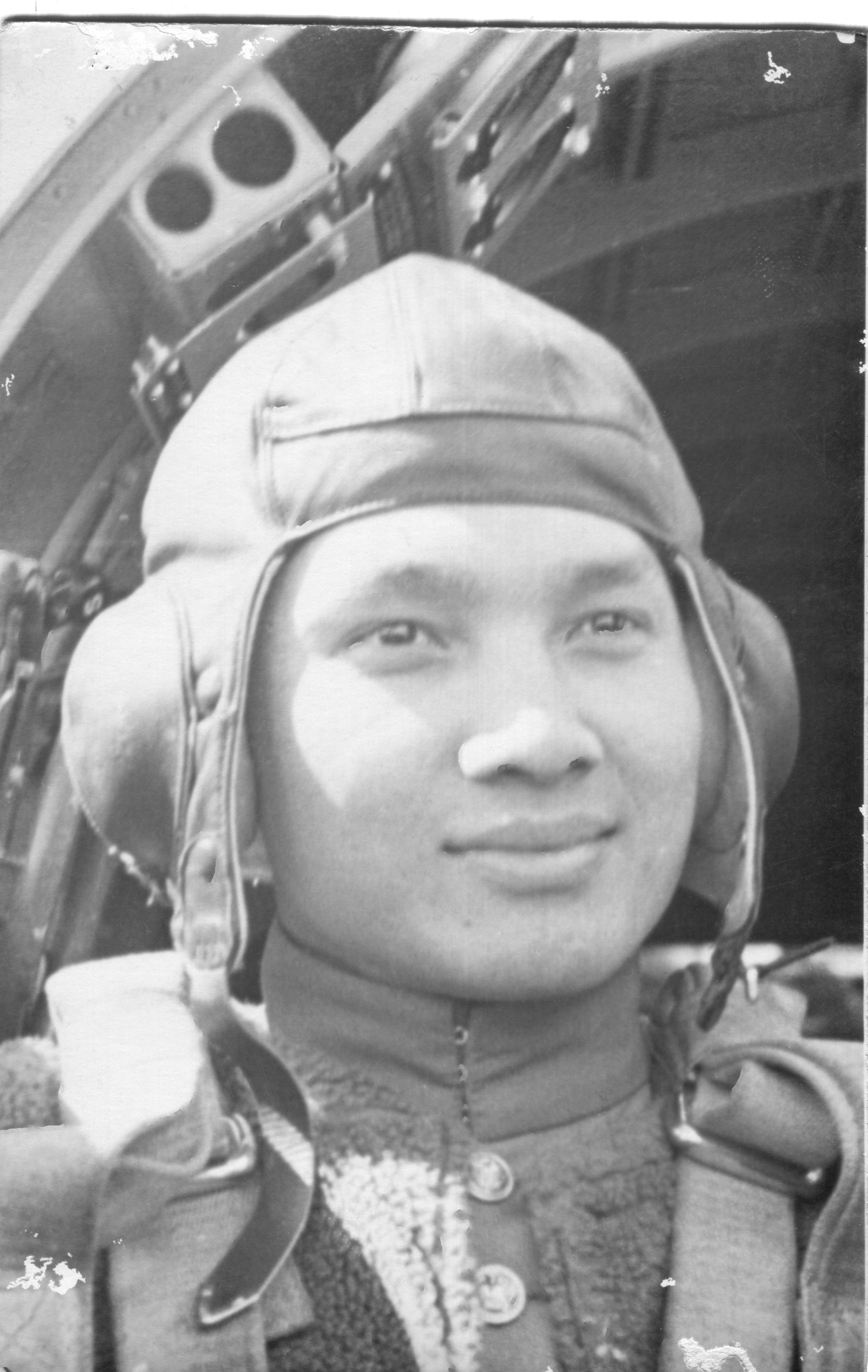
Pilot Dawee during World War II

Dawee soon joined the Air Force, and by 1938 had been promoted to flying officer. The young officer was soon enrolled in bombing and training courses with the RAF and USAAF, and returned two years later to become commanding officer of the 3rd Fighter Squadron, whose base was at Don Mueang.

The conflict with French Indochina saw Dawee leading the 60th Fighter Squadron, which was composed of nine Hawk 75Ns. On 24 January 1941, it was Dawee's fighters that escorted the Ki-30 Nagoyas on the raid on the French airfield at Angkor Wat.

Flight Lieutenant Dawee was a member of the last Thai military mission to Malaya in October 1941, and returned just days before the commencement of the Pacific War.

== World War II ==
=== Early days ===
At 08:00 on 8 December 1941, Flight Lieutenant Dawee Chullasapya and Pilot Officer Sangwaan Worasap rushed off in their Hawk 75Ns to pursue a lone Japanese reconnaissance plane cruising in the skies above Don Mueang. The chase was frantic, but ultimately the Japanese pilot was saved from being shot down when the two Thai pilots were ordered to stand down and return to base.

Dawee was sent later to serve as an attaché to General Yamashita's headquarters at Alor Star. He accompanied the Japanese 25th Army to as far as Johore before being forced to return to Bangkok as a result of malarial infections.

=== Working with Allies ===
In March 1945, Wing Commander Dawee was ordered to report to the Army Deputy Commander-in-Chief, who quickly presented the Wing Commander to the Regent at his riverside residence. The regent proceeded to explain that Dawee had been chosen to carry out liaison duties with the Allies in India on behalf of the Seri Thai. He was to leave on the night of 21 April by seaplane.

Dawee was to make the journey with three Americans: two OSS officers, Majors John Wester and Howard Palmer; and the Flying Tigers' "Black Mac" McGarry, who since being shot down in the Chiang Mai area in January 1942 had been in a POW camp. Also in tow were 2nd Lieutenant Wimon Wiriyawit, a Seri Thai officer, and Fon Saengsinkaew.

The party arrived in Madras some hours later, and Dawee continued on to Colombo, where he met Sanguan Tularak, a fellow Seri Thai agent. The sojourn in Ceylonese capital did not last long, however, as the Wing Commander was taken by Colonel John Coughlin of the OSS to meet Lord Mountbatten at Kandy. There Dawee received his OSS codename, "Dicky Stone".

Wing Commander Dawee spent his time at Kandy studying aerial photographs of Thailand and assisting the bombing planners at South East Asia Command in selecting accurate Japanese military targets as opposed to Thai civilian ones. Dawee also received lessons in espionage and sabotage, and was forced to attend an intensive week-long OSS training course in Maryland.

A posting to Calcutta saw Dawee acting as a liaison officer at Mountbatten's American deputy, General Raymond B. Wheeler's headquarters. The Thai again acted as a consultant to various USAAF bombing-run plans. He returned to Thailand a while later via seaplane. Dawee was to collect intelligence regarding Japanese troop dispositions, and to aid in the establishment of secret airfields for which the Allies could fly in agents and supplies to reinforce the Seri Thai.

The Wing Commander immediately reported back to Pridi's new residence at the Bang Pa-In Summer Palace, approximately 70 km north of Bangkok.

The next week was spent surveying the Northeast for prospective airfield sites. The sites they chose was in Chaiyaphum Province and at Nonhan in Loei Province. The Royal Thai Air Force duly began construction, assisted in no little part by the Governor of Chaiyaphum, a man fully committed to the resistance, and by Khon Kaen's chief Seri Thai officers, Tiang Sirikhanth and Chamlong Daoruang.

Dawee once more returned to Calcutta, and from there on he oversaw equipment drops by B-24s on Sakhon Nakhorn, and accompanied a C-46 to Kunming and Chungking.

=== Return to Thailand ===
The airfields were ready by June, and Dawee was tasked to return to Thailand on board the first RAF C-47 to fly into the country. Prince Yuthisathien Sawasdiwat, a Seri Thai officer who had been parachuted in to evaluate the airfields, were waiting for him. On 14 June the plane landed, but the wheels sank into the ground. Once the supplies were unloaded, however, the airfield personnel were able to push the plane out of the mud and repair minor damage.

Dawee returned to Calcutta to pick up OSS Major Nicol Smith and Lloyd George, a civilian reports officer, and to bring them to Bangkok for direct talks with Pridi.

=== End of war ===
Dawee supervised the creation of a massive arms cache in the many classrooms of Thammasat University, and returned to Calcutta on 10 August, where he celebrated the end of the war with the staff of SEAC.

== Postwar ==
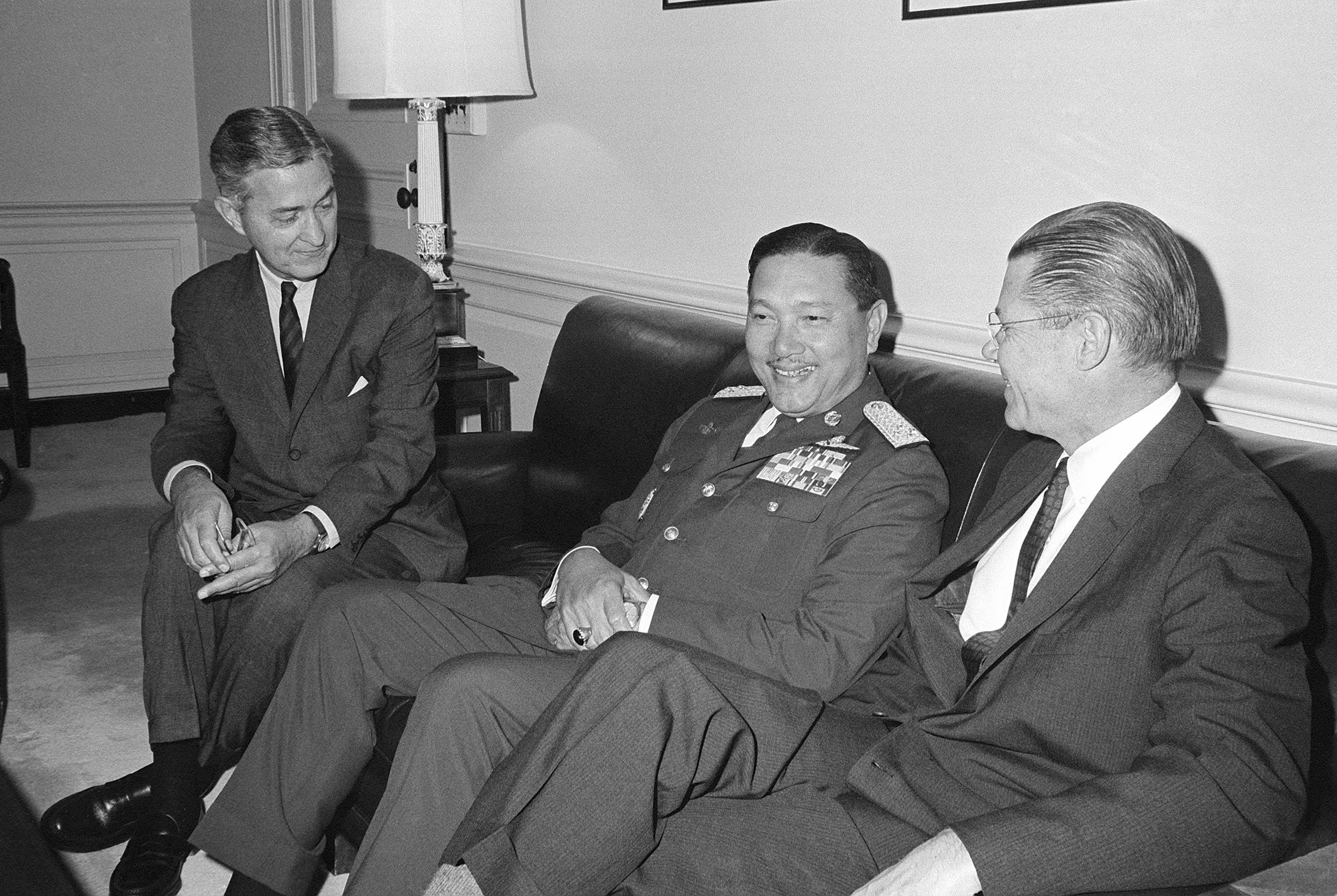
Dawee Chullasapya (center), meets with Secretary of Defense Robert S. McNamara at the Pentagon (1965)

Dawee accompanied Seni Pramoj back to Bangkok on September 16, and returned permanently on December 5, 1945, escorting the young King Ananda Mahidol.

Dawee was the head of the organising committees for the 1966 and 1970 Asian Games, both held in Bangkok. From 1973 to 1974, he was the Supreme Commander of the Royal Thai Armed Forces Headquarters. In 1974, he became the president of the National Olympic Committee of Thailand and member of the International Olympic Committee.

== Political career ==
Dawee was vice minister of defence in Thanom Kittikachorn's government from 1963 to 1969. In January 1969, he ordered the napalm bombing of Hmong villages in Phitsanulok Province who were suspected of fighting for the communists. He stated: "They must be got rid of, once and for all." After Thailand had received a new constitution in 1968, Dawee joined the United Thai People's Party, created by military leaders Thanom Kittikachorn and Praphas Charusathien in order to continue their rule under the guise of parliamentary system. Dawee became the secretary-general of that party. He then served as minister of communication and transport from 1969 to 1971.

After Thanom and Praphas’ self-coup in November 1971, that suspended the constitution, parliament and political parties again, Dawee served as minister of agriculture from 1972 to 1973. In December 1972, he led the negotiations with the Palestinian terrorist group Black September, who penetrated into the Israeli embassy in Bangkok and held several hostages. Dawee could achieve the release of all the hostages and a bloodless end of the crisis. Instead of the hostages, Dawee and Chatichai Choonhavan, then deputy foreign minister and future prime minister, accompanied the terrorists as surety on their freedom flight to Cairo.

After the popular uprising of 1973, he was minister of defence under Prime Minister Sanya Dharmasakti and Supreme Commander of the Thai Armed Forces from 1973 to 1974. In December 1973, one and a half years before Thailand officially established diplomatic relations with the People's Republic of China, Dawee and Chatichai —who was foreign minister by that time—were the first Thai government officials to visit Beijing. There, they negotiated a contract for the supply of 50,000 tons of diesel oil at a "friendship price" and promised to remove trade barriers between the two nations.

In 1974, Dawee co-founded the Social Justice Party, of which he became the chairman in 1976. He served as deputy prime minister and minister of public health under Seni Pramoj, until the day of the Thammasat University massacre, 6 October 1976. He was again deputy prime minister, this time under Kriangsak Chomanan, from 1979 to 1980.

== Honours ==
received the following royal decorations in the Honours System of Thailand:

- Knight Grand Cross of the Most Illustrious Order of Chula Chom Klao
- Knight Grand Cordon of the Most Exalted Order of the White Elephant
- Knight Grand Cordon of the Most Noble Order of the Crown of Thailand
- Knight Commander of the Honourable Order of Rama
- Bravery Medal
- Victory Medal - Franco-Thai War
- Victory Medal - Pacific War
- Freeman Safeguarding Medal, 1st Class
- Safeguarding the Constitution Medal
- Medal for Service Rendered in the Interior
- Border Service Medal
- Chakra Mala Medal
- Boy Scout Citation Medal of Vajira, First Class
- King Rama VIII Royal Cypher Medal, 4th
- King Rama IX Royal Cypher Medal, 2nd

=== Foreign honours ===
- United States :
  - Commander of the Legion of Merit (1963)
  - Asiatic-Pacific Campaign Medal
  - World War II Victory Medal
  - Medal of Freedom with Bronze Palm (1947)
- South Vietnam :
  - Grand Cross of the National Order of Vietnam (1955)
  - Kim Khanh Decoration, First Class (1957)
- Burma :
  - Commander of the Order of the Union of Burma (Civilian Member) (1956)
- Belgium :
  - Grand Cross of the Order of the Crown (1960)
- Taiwan :
  - Special Grand Cordon of the Order of the Cloud and Banner (1962)
  - Special Grand Cordon of the Order of Brilliant Star
- (Ethiopian Empire) Ethiopia :
  - Grand Cross of the Order of the Star of Ethiopia (1963)
- Norway :
  - Grand Cross of the Royal Norwegian Order of Saint Olav (1963)
- Malaysia :
  - Honorary Commander of the Order of the Defender of the Realm (1964)
  - Honorary Grand Commander of the Order of Loyalty to the Crown of Malaysia(1967)
- Argentina :
  - Grand Cross of the Order of May (1964)
- South Korea :
  - Order of Service Merit with Blue Stripes, 1st Class (1966)
- Indonesia :
  - Star of the Republic of Indonesia, Adipurna Class (1966)
- Iran :
  - Grand Cross of the Order of Homayoun with Sash (1967)
- United Kingdom :
  - Honorary Knight Commander of the Order of the British Empire (1968)
- Japan :
  - Grand Cordon of the Order of the Sacred Treasure (1969)
- Kingdom of Laos :
  - Grand Cross of the Order of the Million Elephants and the White Parasol (1969)
- Sweden :
  - Commander Grand Cross of the Royal Order of the Sword (1969)
- Austria :
  - Grand Decoration of Honour in Silver of the Decoration of Honour for Services to the Republic of Austria with Sash (1972)
- Philippines :
  - Commander of the Philippine Legion of Honor

=== Military rank ===
- General, Admiral and Air Chief Marshal

=== Volunteer Defense Corps of Thailand rank ===
- Volunteer Defense Corps General
