= Krasae Chanawongse =

Thai physician (born 1934)

Krasae Chanawongse M.D. MPCh MWM
- กระแส ชนะวงศ์
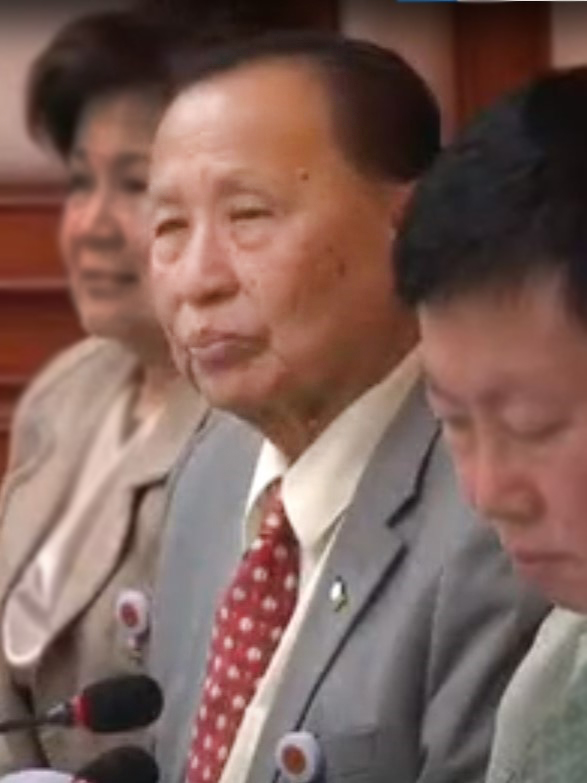

Minister to the Office of the Prime Minister
- In office 17 February 2001 – 11 March 2005
- Prime Minister: Thaksin Shinawatra
- Preceded by: Abhisit Vejjajiva; Jurin Laksanawisit; Paveena Hongsakul; Somboon Rahong
- Succeeded by: Suranand Vejjajiva; Newin Chidchob

Minister of Foreign Affairs
- In office 16 February 1995 – 19 May 1995
- Prime Minister: Chuan Leekpai
- Preceded by: Thaksin Shinawatra
- Succeeded by: M.R. Kasem S. Kasemsri

Minister of University Affairs
- In office 15 October 1994 – 11 February 1995
- Prime Minister: Chuan Leekpai
- Preceded by: Suthep Atthakorn
- Succeeded by: Thawin Praison

Personal details
- Born: 1 March 1934 (age 92) Phon, Khon Kaen, Thailand
- Party: Thai Rak Thai; Palang Dharma; New Force
- Spouse: Penkae Chanawongse (died 2009)
- Children: 2
- Education: Faculty of Medicine Siriraj Hospital; London School of Hygiene & Tropical Medicine; Columbia University
- Profession: Physician

Krasae Chanawongse (Thai: กระแส ชนะวงศ์, RTGS: Krasae Chanawong, born 1 March 1934) is a Thai physician, professor of medicine, and politician. He is the recipient of the 1973 Ramon Magsaysay Award for Community Leadership. In 1995, he served as Foreign Minister of Thailand. From 2001 to 2005 he was minister to the Office of the Prime Minister and advisor of Thaksin Shinawatra.

== Early life and education ==
Krasae Chanawongse was born in Phon District, Khon Kaen Province, in rural Northeastern Thailand, as one of eight siblings in a poor family. After leaving school at age 13 and an unpaid apprenticeship in a lumber shop, he resumed his secondary education while earning money as a delivery boy. He studied medicine at Chulalongkorn University and the Faculty of Medicine Siriraj Hospital. He graduated with an MD degree in 1960. He added postgraduate studies for a Diploma in Tropical Public Health from the London School of Hygiene & Tropical Medicine in 1967, and took his Doctor of Public Health degree from Columbia University in 1980.

== Professional career ==
From 1960 to 1973, Krasae worked as a physician in Phon. From 1973 to 1975, he led the rural mother and child health program of Khon Kaen province. From 1982 to 1990 he was the director of the ASEAN Institute for Health Development in Bangkok. He was the research and development director of the Naresuan University from 1989 to 1991.

In 1973, Krasae received the Ramon Magsaysay Award in the category "Community Leadership". The awarding foundation honoured his commitment for health care development in one of the least-developed rural regions of the country, citing his "12-year crusade for sanitation, preventive medicine and curative treatment".

== Political career ==
Krasae founded the progressive liberal and moderate left-wing New Force Party in 1974. He was elected Member of Parliament representing Khon Kaen in 1975 and 1976. He was named Deputy Minister of Public Health in 1979, serving in the short-lived cabinet of Kriangsak Chomanan. Having become a member of the Palang Dharma Party in the meantime, he served as Deputy Governor of Bangkok, responsible for health services and public welfare, in 1993.

In 1994, he was appointed Minister of University Affairs in the cabinet of Chuan Leekpai. In February 1995, he switched to the Foreign Ministry, but resigned again as early as in May of the same year. When Palang Dharma leader Thaksin Shinawatra left the party to found his Thai Rak Thai Party, Krasae followed him. Upon becoming prime minister in 2001, Thaksin made Krasae minister to the Office of the Prime Minister. He served in that office for four years.

In 2010, the New York Times considered Krasae a "strong monarchist".

== Decorations ==
- Knight Grand Cordon (Special Class) of the Order of the White Elephant (1994)
- Knight Grand Cordon (Special Class) of the Order of the Crown of Thailand (1995)
- Grand Cordon (First Class) of the Order of the Rising Sun (Japan; 2004)

== Works ==
- Rural Health Care in Thailand: an Assessment and Strategies for the Future; Columbia University, 1982
- Primary Health Care in Thailand: Theory and Reality; ASEAN Institute for Health Development, Mahidol University, 1985
- A Decade of Primary Health Care in ASEAN Member Countries; ASEAN Institute for Health Development, Mahidol University, 1988
- Rural Development Management: Principles, Propositions, and Challenges; Research and Development Institute, Khon Kaen University, 1991
- Participatory Development in the Context of Southeast Asian Nations; Friedrich Ebert Stiftung, 1998
