= Social Action Party =

Defunct political party in Thailand

Social Action Party พรรคกิจสังคม
- Leader: Thongphun Diphrai
- Secretary-General: Sayomphu Kiatsayomohu
- Founder: Kukrit Pramoj
- Founded: 4 November 1974
- Dissolved: 19 October 2018
- Preceded by: Democrat Party (faction); United Thai People's Party (faction)
- Headquarters: Khon Kaen
- Ideology: Liberal conservatism Progressivism; Economic liberalism Constitutional monarchism
- Political position: Centre-left (1970s); Centre-right (1980s)

The Social Action Party (Thai: พรรคกิจสังคม, RTGS: Phak Kit Sangkhom) was a former political party in Thailand.

== History ==
The Social Action Party was formed by the more liberal members of the Democrat Party in 1974 under the leadership of Kukrit Pramoj. After Kukrit resigned the office of the party leader in December 1985, the former minister of foreign affairs and deputy party leader, Siddhi Savetsila, led the party.

Internal conflict during the 1986 parliamentary election resulted in a significant loss for the party. Controversy arose as rumor spread that General Arthit Kamlang-ek was secretly backing the party. By May 1986, with financial support from big businesses, a faction of the party split off with Boontheng Thongsawasdi to form the United Democracy Party, which proved to be unsuccessful.

Corruption scandals continued to devastate the party. In the fall of 1990, when Prime Minister Chatichai Choonhavan threatened to expel the party from his government coalition, founder Kukrit was asked to return briefly to replace Siddhi Savetsila. Partly because Chatichai had previously served Kukrit as foreign minister, Chatichai ultimately decided not to expel the party.

In December 1990, along with the Democratic Party, the Social Action Party withdrew entirely from Chatichai's government coalition, though it later rejoined Suchinda Kraprayoon's government in April 1992. It left the pro-military coaliliton in June 1992.

After splitting into two factions as a result of a power struggle in 1999, the party once again withdrew from the government led by Prime Minister Chuan Leekpai, with 17 Parliament members withdrawing from the ruling coalition. In 2000, many of the members, including former leader Suwit Khunkitti, left Social Action for the Thai Rak Thai party.

=== 2001–2018 ===
By 2001, the Social Action Party had lost much of the political support it once held in the 1970s. In that year's election, the party secured only a single seat in parliament. Two years later, in 2003, the party was officially disbanded. The party was revived in 2008 as Suwit returned. He was a member of the Cabinet of Thailand under Prime Minister Abhisit Vejjajiva's coalition government. In the 2011 Thai general election, the Social Action Party won 0.3% of party-list votes and no seats. The Social Action Party was dissolved in 2018 due to an order of the Election Commission of Thailand.

== Ideology ==
The Social Action Party advocated pro-free-enterprise fiscal policies.

== Leader ==
- Mom Rajawongse Kukrit Pramoj (1974–1985)
- Air Chief Marshal Siddhi Savetsila (1985–1990)
- M.R. Kukrit Pramoj (again, shortly in 1990)
- Montri Pongpanich (1990–1998)
- Boonphan Kaewattana (1998–1999)
- Suwit Khunkitti (1999–2000)
- Payung Nopsuwan (2000–2003)
- Jetsada Tantibunchachai (2003–2004)
- Attapol Chainansmith (2004–2007)
- Tongpool Deepai (2008–2018)

== General election results ==
Election	Total seats won	Total votes	Share of votes	Outcome of election	Election leader
1975	18 / 269	1,982,168	10.8%	▲18 seats	Kukrit Pramoj
1976	45 / 279	3,272,170	17.5%	▲27 seats	Kukrit Pramoj
1979	82 / 301	4,179,174	21.1%	▲37 seats	Kukrit Pramoj
1983	92 / 324	7,103,177	26.8%	▲10 seats	Kukrit Pramoj
1986	51 / 347	4,560,615	12.1%	▼40 seats	Siddhi Savetsila
1988	54 / 357	4,651,161	11.8%	▲3 seats	Siddhi Savetsila
1992 (Mar)	31 / 360	3,586,714	8.1%	▼23 seats	Montri Pongpanich
1992 (Sep)	22 / 360	1,863,360	4.0%	▼9 seats	Montri Pongpanich
1995	22 / 391	2,201,218	4.0%		Montri Pongpanich
1996	20 / 393	3,036,544	5.3%	▼2 seats	Montri Pongpanich
2001	1 / 500			▼19 seats	Payung Nopsuwan
2005	0 / 500			▼1 seats	Attapol Chainansmith
2006	0 / 500				Attapol Chainansmith
2007	0 / 480				
2011	0 / 500				Tongpool Deepai
2014	0 / 500	Invalidated	Invalidated	Nullified	Tongpool Deepai

== Social Action Party Speaker ==
Name	Portrait	Periods in Office	Election
Boontheng Thongsawat		9 May 1979 – 19 March 1983	1979 (13rd)

== Social Action Party Prime Ministers ==
Name	Portrait	Start Date	End Date	Election
Kukrit Pramoj		14 March 1975	20 April 1976	— (11st)
