= Thai Nation Party =

Thai Nation Party พรรคชาติไทย
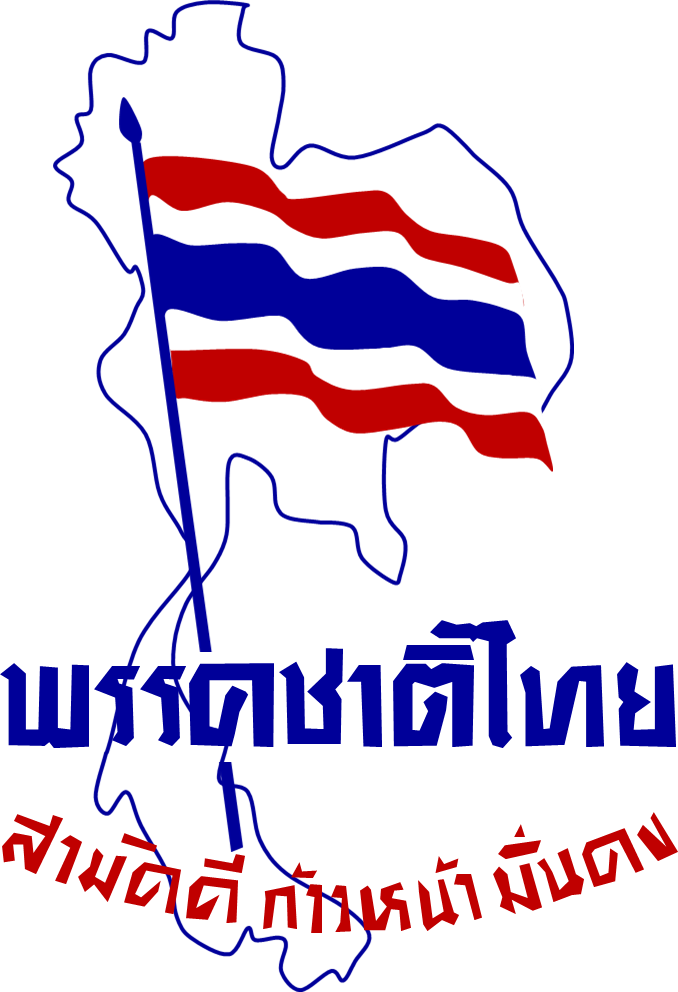
- Founder: Praman Adireksan; Chatichai Choonhavan
- Founded: 19 November 1974
- Dissolved: 2 December 2008
- Succeeded by: Chartthaipattana Party (de facto)
- Ideology: Thai nationalism Conservatism; Regionalism; 1986–1991: Neoliberalism; 1974–1986: Anti-communism
- Political position: 1974–1986: Right-wing to far-right 1986–1994: Centre-right to right-wing 1994–2008; Centre-right

Website
- www.chartthai.or.th (archived)

The Thai Nation Party, or Chart Thai Party (Thai: พรรคชาติไทย, RTGS: Phak Chat Thai) was a conservative political party in Thailand. It was dissolved by the Constitutional Court of Thailand on December 2, 2008, along with the People's Power Party and the Neutral Democratic Party, for having violated electoral laws in the 2007 Thai general election. Thereafter, most MPs founded the Chartthaipattana Party (Thai Nation Development Party), which became the Thai Nation Party's successor.

== Foundation and first electoral successes ==
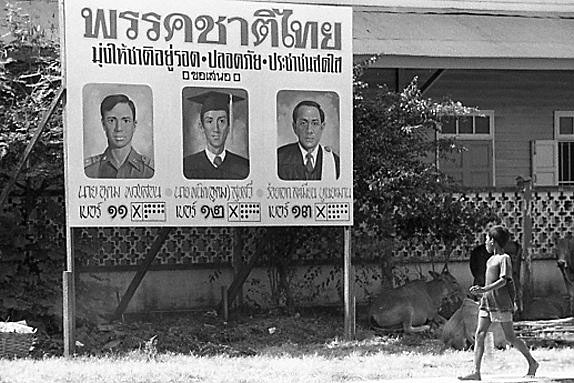
Thai Nation Party campaign billboard at Songkhla in 1976

The Thai Nation Party was founded in 1974 by Chatichai Choonhavan, son of Field Marshal Phin Choonhavan, and his in-laws Pramarn Adireksarn and Siri Siriyothin, who were at the time major-generals like him. The three belonged to the "Rajakru clan", a military, economic and political interest group established by Field Marshal Phin. The party represented the rightist and pro-military wing of Thai politics during the relatively liberal and democratic years from 1973 to 1976. During the campaign for the election in April 1976, the party called for "the Right to kill the Left", and party chairman and Deputy Prime Minister Pramarn declared in a cabinet meeting on October 6, 1976, that it was the right moment to destroy the student movement, which was eventually executed in the Thammasat University massacre.

In the subsequent elections 1976, 1979, 1983 and 1986, the party consistently was the second-strongest party. During the 1980s, the party deideologized itself. It was a "government party" that tried to be part of the ruling coalition at any rate. Only between 1983 and 1986 it was the main parliamentary opposition. According to then-secretary general Banharn Silpa-archa, "for a politician, being in opposition is like starving yourself to death."

== Chatichai and Banharn governments ==
In the general election of 1988, the Thai Nation Party won the most votes, resulting in its leader Chatichai Choonhavan becoming the prime minister. Chatichai was the first democratically elected Prime Minister of Thailand in over a decade. Chatichai's government became known as the "buffet cabinet" for its members scrambling overtly over the distribution of public funds. The Thai Nation Party advocated a reinforcement of the role of Parliament, in which many businessmen from the province were represented who had gained wealth and growing political ambitions, vis-à-vis the traditionally powerful, but not democratically legitimised administration. Chatichai's government was deposed by a military coup d'état in 1991. The putschists accused the Prime Minister and several other members of the cabinet of having acquired "unusual wealth".

After the March 1992 general election, the Thai Nation Party — now led by Air Chief Marshal Somboon Rahong — joined a military-sponsored coalition led by the Justice Unity Party (Samakkhi Tham), under coup leader General Suchinda Kraprayoon. During the street protests and bloody crackdown of Black May 1992, it was therefore considered one of the "devil parties". One of the party's factions rejected this alliance and left the party to found the National Development Party (Chart Pattana). It was led by former Thai Nation leader and Prime Minister Chatichai.

After return to democracy in 1992, the Thai Nation Party became the main opposition force against the Democrat-led government of Chuan Leekpai. In a 1993 representative survey, 50% of the respondents identified the Thai Nation Party as the most corrupt of the country. In 1994 Banharn Silpa-archa, a billionaire construction building contractor and "godfather of Suphan Buri", became the party's chairman. The party won the 1995 elections that were heavily tainted with vote-buying. Banharn became Prime Minister, but his government coalition broke as early as in November 1996. After new elections, Chart Thai was in opposition against the short-lived government of Chavalit Yongchaiyudh. In November 1997, it joined a seven-party coalition supporting Democrat Prime Minister Chuan Leekpai.

== During the Thaksin premiership ==
In the 2001 elections, the Thai Nation Party won 41 out of 500 seats and formed a coalition government with the largest party, the populist Thai Rak Thai, formerly led and co-founded by tycoon Thaksin Shinawatra. The party lost some seats in the 2005 elections, despite the support of the popular politician and former "massage parlour" owner Chuwit Kamolvisit. The party won 11.4% of the popular vote and 27 out of 500 seats. Due to policy conflicts, the Chart Thai Party subsequently defected from the coalition with the Thai Rak Thai party. The party, along with the 2 other largest opposition parties, boycotted the elections of April 2006 hoping to make it impossible for a new Thai Rak Thai-led government to form.

== After the 2006 coup ==
The Thai Nation Party participated in the 2007 general election and won 8.87% of the vote (37 of 480 seats), coming in third after the People Power Party (led by former Thai Rak Thai members) and the Democrats. In January 2008, the Thai Nation Party joined the PPP and five others in the six-party coalition government.

Along with the coalition members People Power Party and Matchima, the Thai Nation Party was dissolved by the Constitutional Court on December 2, 2008, with party executives banned from Thai politics for five years, amid charges of electoral fraud during the 2007 election. The non-executive MPs of the parties were given 60 days to defect to new or existing parties. MPs from the Chart Thai and Matchima parties announced that they would stick with MPs from the PPP party in forming a new government, but failed to do so due to the party dissolution. Thereafter, most former Chart Thai MPs and members convened to found the Chartthaipattana Party (Thai Nation Development Party), which has been part of the coalition government since 2008.

== Thai Nation Party Prime Ministers ==
Name	Portrait	Periods in Office	Election
Chatichai Choonhavan		4 August 1988 – 23 February 1991	1988 (16th)
Banharn Silpa-archa		13 July 1995 – 24 November 1996	1995 (19th)

== Thai Nation Party Speaker ==
Name	Portrait	Periods in Office	Election
Panja Kesornthong		3 August 1988 – 23 February 1991	1988 (16th)
Booneua Prasertsuwan		11 July 1995 – 27 September 1996	1995 (19th)

== Party leader ==
- General Pramarn Adireksarn (1974–1986)
- General Chatichai Choonhavan (1986–1991)
- Air Chief Marshal Somboon Rahong (1991–1992)
- General Pramarn Adireksarn (1992–1994)
- Banharn Silpa-archa (1994–2008)
