= Bodindechanuchit =

Thai noble title

Bodindechanuchit (Thai: บดินทรเดชานุชิต) is a Thai noble title (ราชทินนาม, ratchathinnanam) granted to leaders of the military. In the Ayutthaya period, it was granted to some samuhanayok, one of the king's two chief chancellors under the chatusadom system. In the Rattanakosin period, it was granted to two ministers of defence under the new government system introduced by King Chulalongkorn in the 1880s.

People who held the title include:

- Chaophraya Bodindechanuchit (Arun Chatrakul), held the title from 1912 until his death in 1921
- Chaophraya Bodindechanuchit (Yaem na Nakhon), held the title from 1922 until his death in 1961
