= 1977 Thai coup d'état =

The 1977 Thai coup d'état may refer one of the following:

- March 1977 Thai coup d'état attempt
- October 1977 Thai coup d'état

== See also ==
- Thai coup d'état (disambiguation)
- List of coups and coup attempts by country § Thailand
