= October 1977 Thai coup d'état =

1977 military coup in Thailand

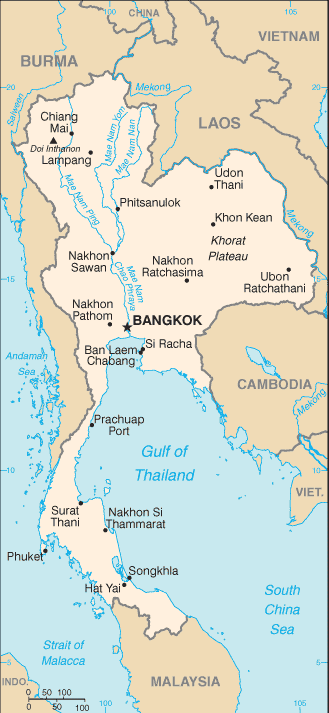
- CIA WFB map of Thailand
Date	20 October 1977
Location	Thailand
Result	Successful military takeover: Thanin Kraivichien steps down

Belligerents
(Thailand) Royal Thai Armed Forces; National Administrative Reform Council (NARC)	Thanin Cabinet

Commanders and leaders
(Thailand) Kriangsak Chamanan (Thailand) Sangad Chaloryu	Thanin Kraivichien

The October 1977 Thai coup d'état was a bloodless military coup which took place in Thailand on 20 October 1977, staged by the Royal Thai Armed Forces (RTAF). The coup was carried out under the nominal authority of Admiral Sangad Chaloryu of the Royal Thai Navy, head of the National Administrative Reform Council (NARC), but it was effectively led by General Kriangsak Chamanan of the Royal Thai Army, Supreme Commander of the RTAF. It led to the deposition of Prime Minister Thanin Kraivichien, who assumed the office following the 1976 coup d'état (which was also led by Admiral Sangad and resulted in the establishment of the NARC), in the immediate aftermath of the Thammasat University massacre.

The October coup was preceded by the March 1977 coup d'état attempt. Their attempted coup failed.

The military justified their intervention in October because Thanin's government had divided the country, had virtually no public support, the economic situation had worsened, and people in general disagreed with such a long-term suspension of democracy.

General Kriangsak assumed the office of Prime Minister, and served until his resignation in 1980.

== See also ==
- History of Thailand (1973–2001)
- List of coups d'état and coup attempts by country#Thailand
