= Sutin Klungsang =

Thai politician and educator (born 1961)

Sutin Klungsang MPCh MVM MP
- สุทิน คลังแสง
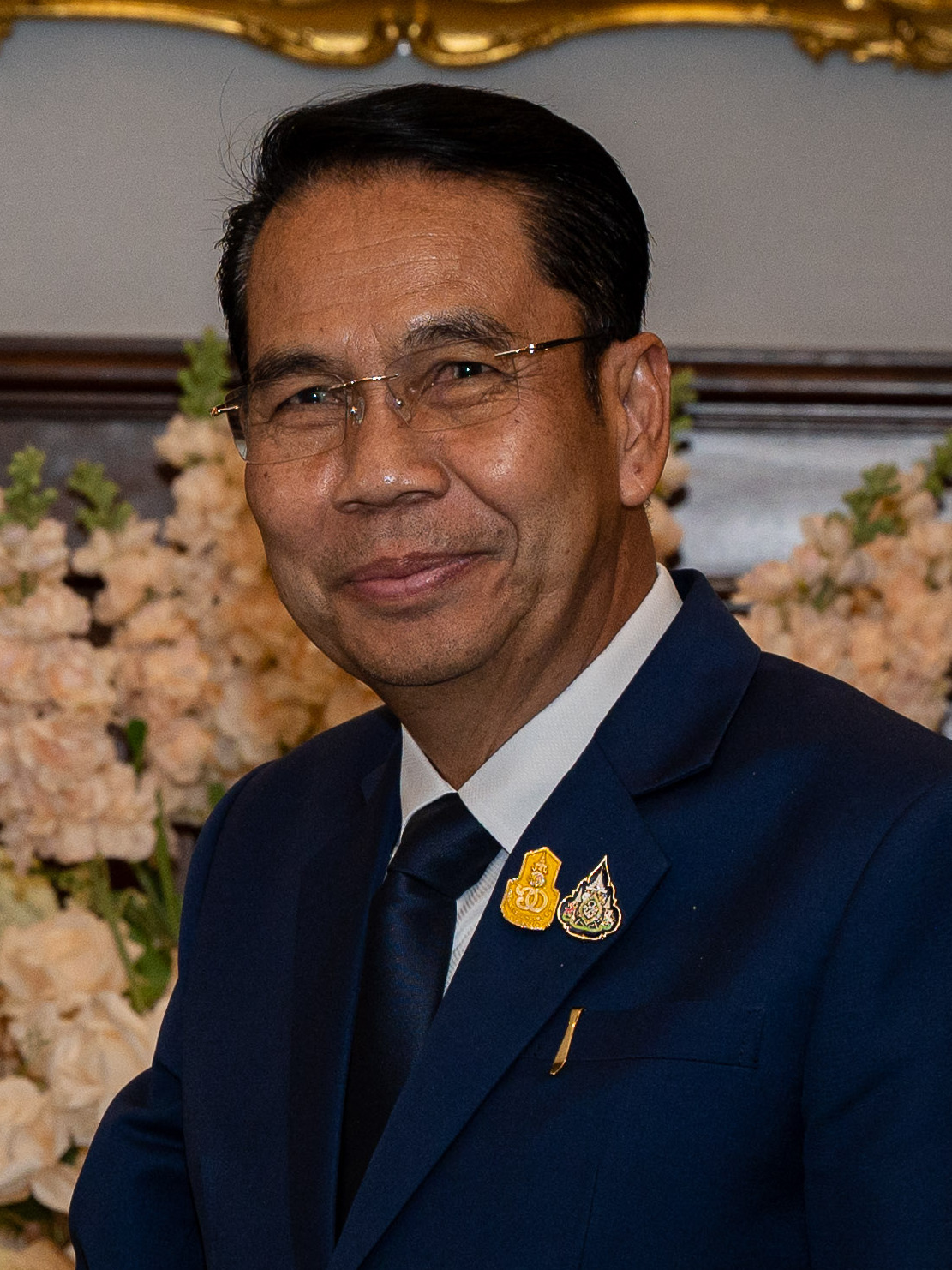
- Sutin in 2024

Minister of Defence
- In office 1 September 2023 – 3 September 2024
- Prime Minister: Srettha Thavisin
- Preceded by: Prayut Chan-o-cha
- Succeeded by: Phumtham Wechayachai

Opposition Chief Whip in the House of Representatives
- In office 28 May 2019 – 20 March 2023
- Leader: Sompong Amornwiwat; Chonlanan Srikaew
- Preceded by: Jurin Laksanawisit
- Succeeded by: Pakornwut Udompipatskul

Member of the House of Representatives for Party-list
- Incumbent
- Assumed office 14 May 2023
- In office 6 January 2001 – 5 January 2005

Member of the House of Representatives for Maha Sarakham
- In office 24 March 2019 – 20 March 2023
- Constituency: 5th district (2019)
- In office 6 February 2005 – 2 December 2008
- Constituency: 1st district (2005, 2007)

Personal details
- Born: 9 March 1961 (age 65) Chiang Yuen, Maha Sarakham, Thailand
- Party: Pheu Thai (2012–present)
- Other political affiliations: Thai Rak Thai (1998–2006); People's Power (2007–2008)
- Spouse: Chaweewan Klangsaeng
- Education: Srinakharinwirot University; Mahasarakham University; Magadh University
- Profession: Politician, educator

Sutin Klungsang (Thai: สุทิน คลังแสง, RTGS: Suthin Khlangsaeng; born 9 March 1961) is a Thai politician and educator. He served as the Thai Minister of Defence from 2023 to 2024.

== Early life and education ==
Sutin graduated with a bachelor's degree in education from Srinakharinwirot University, Maha Sarakham campus, and a master's degree in Thai Studies Branch from Mahasarakham University and a Doctor of Philosophy from Magadh University, India.

== Political careers ==
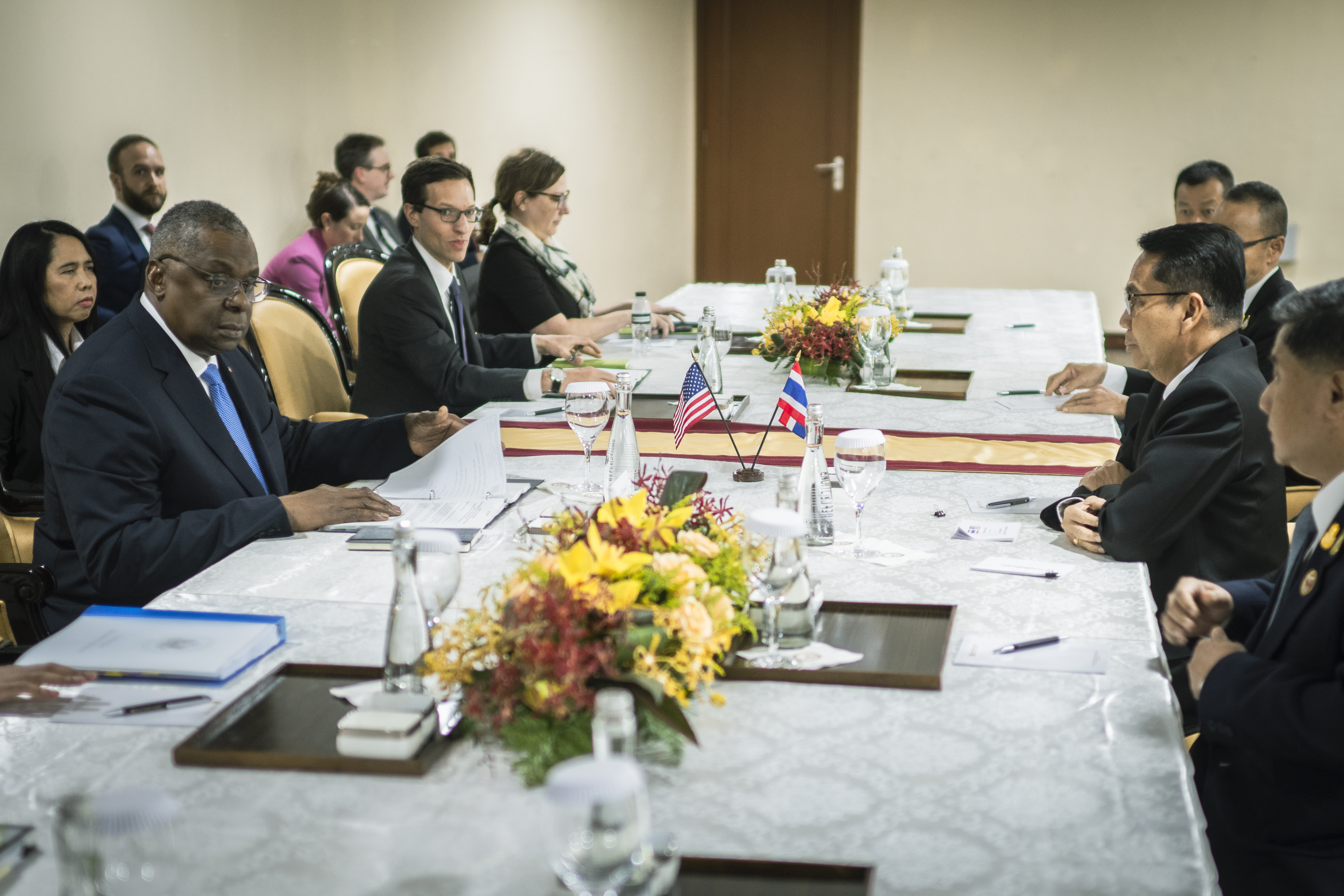
Sutin with US Secretary of Defense Lloyd Austin at the 10th ASEAN Defense Ministers' Meeting Plus in Jakarta, Indonesia in 2023

After the 2019 Thai general election, he shone heavily in politics, being a key figure of the Pheu Thai Party in the heated parliamentary debate on Prime Minister Prayut Chan-o-cha and he was appointed Chairman of the Opposition whips in the 2019 election, looking for a point to attack the government of Prayut.

On 1 September 2023, he was appointed Minister of Defence, becoming the first civilian in Thailand to hold this position without holding the position of Prime Minister.

== Honours, decorations and awards ==
- 2020 – Knight Grand Cordon (Special Class) of the Most Exalted Order of the White Elephant
- 2008 – Knight Grand Cordon (Special Class) of the Most Noble Order of the Crown of Thailand
