= March 1977 Thai coup attempt =

March 1977 coup attempt in Thailand

March 1977 coup attempt in Thailand
Date	26 March 1977; 49 years ago
Location	Thailand
Result	Failed military takeover: Chalard Hiranyasiri executed; Sawin Hiranyasiri life imprisoned

Belligerents
(Thailand) 9th Infantry Division	Thanin Cabinet (Thailand) Royal Thai Army

Commanders and leaders
(Thailand) Chalard Hiranyasiri (Thailand) Sawin Hiranyasiri	Thanin Kraivichien (Thailand) Sangad Chaloryu

Strength
300	

Casualties and losses
1 (Chalard Hiranyasiri)	2 (Arun Thavathasin and an enlisted army soldier)

The March 1977 Thai coup d'état attempt was a military coup attempt against the military government of Thanin Kraivichien and junta leader Sangad Chaloryu, by Chalard Hiranyasiri on 26 March 1977, but failed within 12 hours. Chalard was executed one month later without trial, in retaliation of the killing of Arun Thavathasin, close friend of King Bhumibol Adulyadej.

== Background ==
Thailand descended into political chaos in 1976, with anti-leftist groups growing increasingly violent. The military pressured Kukrit Pramoj to dissolve parliament. Elections were scheduled on 14 April. The months leading up to the election were particularly eventful: The head of the Socialist Party was assassinated, the Red Gaurs attempted to bomb the headquarters of the New Force Party (a leftist party), and the Chart Thai Party was established with the slogan "Right Kills Left". Seni Pramoj's Democrats won the most seats in the election, and formed an unstable coalition government. Kris Sivara was named defense minister, but died a week later. His death has been called "...sudden and strange..."

Tensions were building within the military as different factions fought their way to powerful positions, seeking larger roles in politics. One of the military factions consisted of a former Thanom mentee, while another faction was led by Chalard Hiranyasiri, former deputy commander of the Royal Thai Army and former army commander of the Thai military in the Vietnam War.

Members of Chalard's military faction, including Chalard's son Asawin Hiranyasiri, visited Prime Minister Seni Pramoj at Seni's house in June 1976. The Royal Thai Army dismissed them on involvement with the government of Seni amid rumors of a coup. Right-wing extremist groups also intensified their violence towards left-wing movements of students.

Sangad Chaloryu staged a coup on the 6 October 1976 after the massacre in Thammasat University, which followed political turmoil caused by the return of ex-dictator Thanom Kittikachorn to the country, having gone into exile after the 1973 Thai popular uprising. Both Sangad and Chalard's respective factions had planned to stage a coup in October 1976, but Sangad did so first. Neither faction would receive major benefits from the civilian government of Thanin Kraivichien, established after the coup. In January 1977, Praphas Charusathien also returned as a layman, but no conflict occurred.

Chalard refused to report for duty to Sangad's military junta; he was dismissed on 10 October through announcement in the public radio. Chalard then entered the monkhood in a Bangkok Buddhist temple for five months, stated that he wanted to control himself, his monk name was "Sirihiranyo." The death of Kris and the dismissal of Chalard had developed serious political conflict further.

== Coup attempt ==
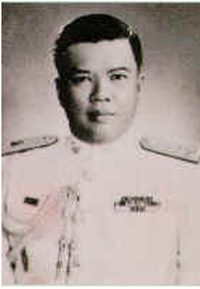
Chalad Hiransiri

Before dawn on 26 March 1977, Chalard Hiranyasiri, four middle-level army officers, and 300 army personnel from 9th Infantry Division in Kanchanaburi province led by Chalard's son, Asawin Hiranyasiri, seized the Internal Security Operations Command (ISOC) building, the Radio Thailand station, and three small military stations in Bangkok. Arun Thavathasin, a close friend of King Bhumibol Adulyadej and popular commander of King's Guard in Bangkok, and an enlisted man, were killed for refusing to cooperate with Chalard in the coup plot. One person was injured after two tanks smashed through the army base's main gate. The coup plotters stated the reason for their attempt was that "the general conditions of national security, the economy and social conditions have been deteriorating."

At 11:00 am, members of the military junta government arrived at the radio station and ordered the rebels to surrender. The government of Thanin announced that the coup leaders would be granted exile abroad if they release the two army general hostages, but the Defence Minister explained after that they had to be tried by the military court.

In the afternoon, electric power was cut off in the area of the radio station and the ISOC building. Meanwhile, the government was continuing to broadcast all day over radio and television. The rebels held ISCO building until after dark, by which Chalard had negotiated their exile with Serm Na Nakorn. The rebel soldiers surrendered one by one, turning over their M16 rifles to the government soldiers around the building compound.

At 10:00 pm, the Thanin government announced a peaceful end to the coup attempt, relaying the 'deep sorrow' of King Bhumibol Adulyadej and Queen Sirikit, during which Thanin read a letter from Queen Sirikit to the widow of Arun. Twenty persons were arrested on grounds related to the failed coup. Despite the coup attempt leaders being promised exile, they were arrested and detained without being allowed to contact anyone.

== Aftermath ==
Kriangsak Chamanan and Prime Minister Thanin Kraivichien approved an order to execute Chalard. King Bhumibol Adulyadej signed orders stripping Chalard of all military ranks, according to palace sources.

Chalard was executed by the junta without a trial on 22 April 1977. Before Chalard's execution, he was not allowed to see his wife or Asawin. Asawin and other coup attempt leaders were sentenced to life in prison. Fourteen persons related to the rebels were sentenced to lengthy terms, such as Pichai Wassanasong, a prominent television commentator, and Raksat Wattanapanich, the Director-General of the Department of Public Relations.

== See also ==
- 1981 Thai military rebellion
- 1985 Thai coup d'état attempt
- 1991 Thai coup d'état
