= List of defence ministers of Thailand =

List of ministers of defence of Thailand

Minister of Defence
- รัฐมนตรีว่าการกระทรวงกลาโหม
- Emblem of the Ministry of Defence

- Standard of Defence Minister

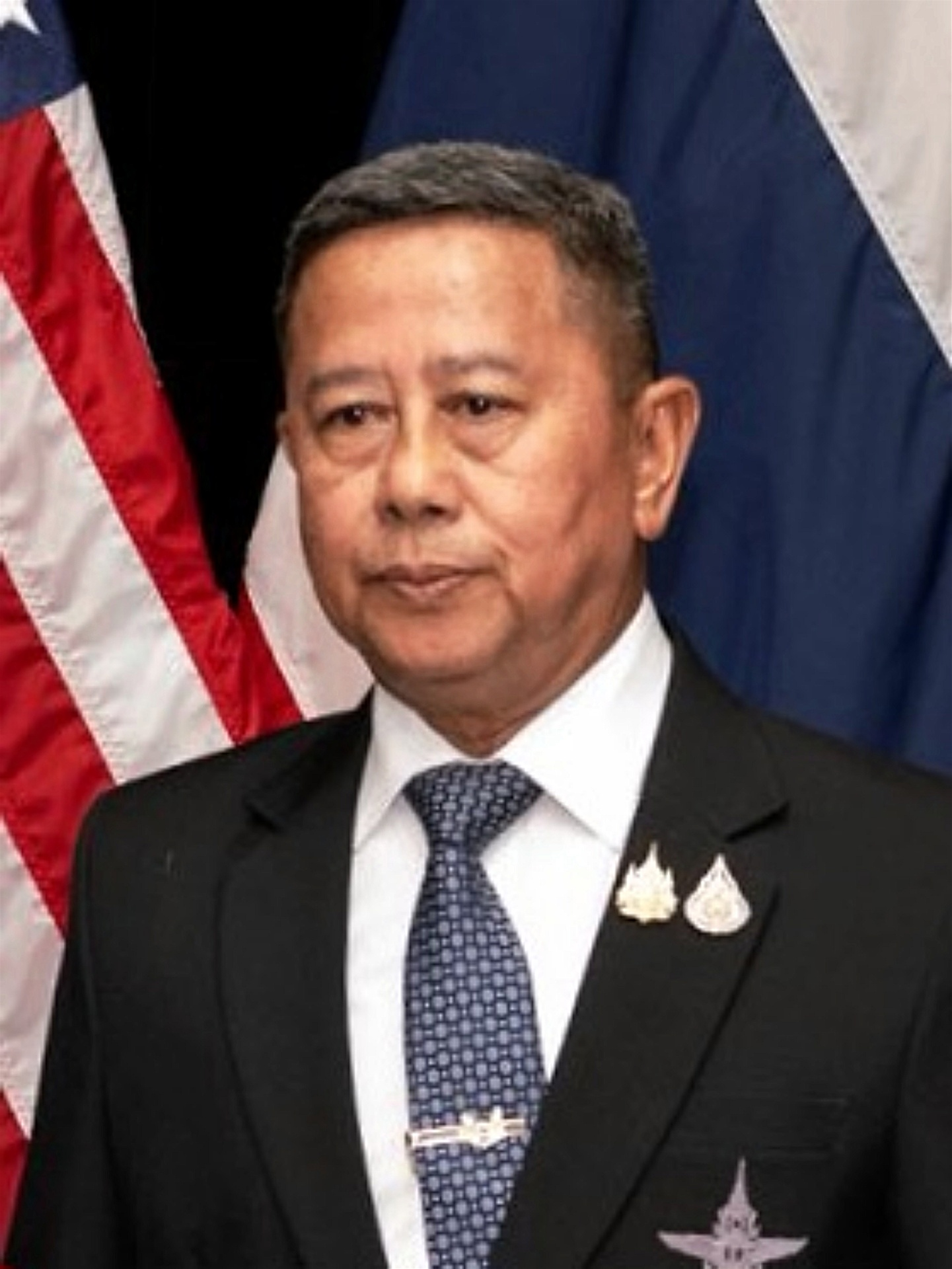
- Incumbent; Adul Boonthamcharoen since 30 March 2026
- Ministry of Defence
- Style: Mr. Minister (informal); The Honourable (formal); His Excellency (diplomatic)
- Member of: Cabinet of Thailand; National Security Council
- Seat: Ministry of Defence headquarters
- Nominator: Prime Minister of Thailand
- Appointer: King of Thailand; (by royal command)
- Term length: until the expiration of the term or the dissolution of the prime minister
- Formation: 1760s (as Samuha Kalahom); 1894; 132 years ago (as Minister of Defence)
- First holder: Phraya Mahasena (as Samuha Kalahom); Prince Narisara Nuwattiwong (as Minister of Defence)
- Deputy: Deputy Minister of Defence
- Salary: ฿115,740 per month ($3,464 USD)
- Website: mod.go.th

This is a list of ministers of defence of Thailand. Until the appointment of the incumbent, Sutin Klungsang, aside from Prime Ministers holding the post concurrently, all ministers had been active-duty or retired flag officers. Sutin is the first civilian to be the head of the Ministry of Defence without holding the post of Prime Minister simultaneously, which were held by five former prime ministers without a military background.

== Minister of Defence of Siam ==
List of Siamese Ministers of Defense (Thai: เสนาบดีกลาโหม, Senabodi Kalahom)

No. (term)	Portrait	Defence Minister	Took office	Left office
12		General Prince Narisara Nuwattiwong (1863–1947)	1894	1899
13		Major General Prince Prachaksinlapakhom (1856–1924)	1899	1901
14		Field Marshal Prince Bhanurangsi Savangwongse (1859–1928)	1901	1910
15		Field Marshal Prince Chirapravati Voradej (1876–1913)	11 December 1910	4 February 1913
16		Field Marshal Chaophraya Bodindechanuchit (Arun Chatrakul) (1856–1921)	4 February 1913	26 August 1921
17		General Chaophraya Bodindechanuchit (Yam Na Nakhon) (1867–1961)	26 August 1921	4 August 1926
18		Field Marshal Prince Paribatra Sukhumbandhu (1881–1944)	24 August 1926	31 March 1928
19		General Prince Boworadej (1877–1953)	1 April 1928	19 June 1931
20		Admiral Prince Vudhijaya Chalermlabha (1883–1947)	8 November 1931	19 June 1932
21		Vice Admiral Phraya Ratchawangsan (Sri Kamalanavin) (1886–1939)	12 August 1932	10 December 1932

== Minister of Defence of Thailand ==
List of ministers of defence of Thailand (Thai: รัฐมนตรีว่าการกระทรวงกลาโหม Ratthamontri Wakarn Kasuang Kalahom)

No. (term)	Portrait	Defence Minister	Branch	Cabinet	Took office	Left office	Prime minister	
21 (1,2)		Vice Admiral Phraya Ratchawangsan (Sri Kamalanavin) (1886–1939)	Royal Thai Navy	2	10 December 1932	1 April 1933	Phraya Manopakorn Nititada	
21 (1,2)		Vice Admiral Phraya Ratchawangsan (Sri Kamalanavin) (1886–1939)	Royal Thai Navy	3	1 April 1933	20 June 1933	Phraya Manopakorn Nititada	
22 (1,2)		Major General Phraya Prasertsongkram (Tiap Komkris) (1882–1951)	Royal Thai Army	4	21 June 1933	16 December 1933	Phraya Phahonphonphayuhasena	
22 (1,2)		Major General Phraya Prasertsongkram (Tiap Komkris) (1882–1951)	Royal Thai Army	5	16 December 1933	1 April 1934	Phraya Phahonphonphayuhasena	
23		Colonel Phraya Phahonphonphayuhasena (Phot Phahonyothin, 1887–1947)	Royal Thai Army	5	1 April 1934	22 September 1934	Phraya Phahonphonphayuhasena	
24 (1-4)		Major General Plaek Phibunsongkhram (1897–1964)	Royal Thai Army	6	22 September 1934	9 August 1937	Phraya Phahonphonphayuhasena	
24 (1-4)		Major General Plaek Phibunsongkhram (1897–1964)	Royal Thai Army	7	10 August 1937	21 December 1937	Phraya Phahonphonphayuhasena	
24 (1-4)		Major General Plaek Phibunsongkhram (1897–1964)	Royal Thai Army	8	21 December 1937	16 December 1938	Phraya Phahonphonphayuhasena	
24 (1-4)		Major General Plaek Phibunsongkhram (1897–1964)	Royal Thai Army	9	21 December 1938	19 August 1941	Plaek Phibunsongkhram	
25		Lieutenant General Mangkorn Phromyothi (1896–1966)	Royal Thai Army	9	19 August 1941	15 December 1941	Plaek Phibunsongkhram	
24 (5-6)		Field Marshal Plaek Phibunsongkhram (1897–1964)	Royal Thai Army	10	10 March 1942	15 November 1943	Plaek Phibunsongkhram	
24 (5-6)		Field Marshal Plaek Phibunsongkhram (1897–1964)	Royal Thai Army	10	10 March 1942	15 November 1943	Plaek Phibunsongkhram	
26		Lieutenant General Phichit Kriangsakphichit (1896–1964)	Royal Thai Army	10	15 November 1943	1 August 1944	Plaek Phibunsongkhram	
27		Vice-Admiral Sindhu Kamalanavin (1901–1976)	Royal Thai Navy	11	2 August 1944	31 August 1945	Khuang Aphaiwong	
28 (1,2)		Lieutenant General Chit Munsilpa Sinadyodharaksa (1896–1988)	Royal Thai Army	12	31 August 1945	17 September 1945	Tawee Boonyaket	
28 (1,2)		Lieutenant General Chit Munsilpa Sinadyodharaksa (1896–1988)	Royal Thai Army	13	19 September 1945	14 October 1945	Seni Pramoj	
29 (1)		Lieutenant General Jira Wichitsongkhram (1897–1979)	Royal Thai Army	13	14 October 1945	31 January 1946	Seni Pramoj	
28 (3)		Lieutenant General Chit Munsilpa Sinadyodharaksa (1896–1988)	Royal Thai Army	14	2 February 1946	24 March 1946	Khuang Aphaiwong	
29 (2-5)		Lieutenant General Jira Wichitsongkhram (1897–1979)	Royal Thai Army	15	24 March 1946	11 June 1946	Pridi Banomyong	
29 (2-5)		Lieutenant General Jira Wichitsongkhram (1897–1979)	Royal Thai Army	16	11 June 1946	23 August 1946	Pridi Banomyong	
29 (2-5)		Lieutenant General Jira Wichitsongkhram (1897–1979)	Royal Thai Army	17	24 August 1946	30 May 1947	Thawan Thamrongnawasawat	
29 (2-5)		Lieutenant General Jira Wichitsongkhram (1897–1979)	Royal Thai Army	18	31 May 1947	8 November 1947	Thawan Thamrongnawasawat	
30 (1-3)		Lieutenant General Suk Chatnakrob (1895–1976)	Royal Thai Army	19	11 November 1947	21 February 1948	Khuang Aphaiwong	
30 (1-3)		Lieutenant General Suk Chatnakrob (1895–1976)	Royal Thai Army	20	25 February 1948	8 April 1948	Khuang Aphaiwong	
30 (1-3)		Lieutenant General Suk Chatnakrob (1895–1976)	Royal Thai Army	21	15 April 1948	25 June 1949	Plaek Phibunsongkhram	
24 (7-10)		Field Marshal Plaek Phibunsongkhram (1897–1964)	Royal Thai Army	22	28 June 1949	29 November 1951	Plaek Phibunsongkhram	
24 (7-10)		Field Marshal Plaek Phibunsongkhram (1897–1964)	Royal Thai Army	23	29 November 1951	6 December 1951	Plaek Phibunsongkhram	
24 (7-10)		Field Marshal Plaek Phibunsongkhram (1897–1964)	Royal Thai Army	24	8 December 1951	23 March 1952	Plaek Phibunsongkhram	
24 (7-10)		Field Marshal Plaek Phibunsongkhram (1897–1964)	Royal Thai Army	25	23 March 1952	26 February 1957	Plaek Phibunsongkhram	
31		Field Marshal Sarit Thanarat (1908–1963)	Royal Thai Army	26	31 March 1957	16 September 1957	Plaek Phibunsongkhram	
32		Field Marshal Thanom Kittikachorn (1911–2004)	Royal Thai Army	27	23 September 1957	26 December 1957	Pote Sarasin	
		Field Marshal Thanom Kittikachorn (1911–2004)	Royal Thai Army	28	1 January 1958	20 October 1958	Thanom Kittikachorn	
32		Field Marshal Thanom Kittikachorn (1911–2004)	Royal Thai Army	29	10 February 1958	8 December 1962	Sarit Thanarat	
		Field Marshal Thanom Kittikachorn (1911–2004)	Royal Thai Army	30	11 December 1962	7 March 1969	Thanom Kittikachorn	
		Field Marshal Thanom Kittikachorn (1911–2004)	Royal Thai Army	31	11 March 1969	17 November 1971	Thanom Kittikachorn	
		Field Marshal Thanom Kittikachorn (1911–2004)	Royal Thai Army	32	19 December 1972	14 October 1973	Thanom Kittikachorn	
33		Air Chief Marshal Dawee Chullasapya	Royal Thai Air Force	33	16 October 1973	22 May 1974	Sanya Dharmasakti	
34		General Kruyn Sutathanin	Royal Thai Army	34	30 May 1974	22 May 1975	Sanya Dharmasakti	
35		General Tawich Seneewong na Ayutthaya	Royal Thai Army	35	15 February 1975	13 March 1975	Seni Pramoj	
36		Major General Pramarn Adireksarn	Royal Thai Army	36	17 March 1975	12 January 1976	Kukrit Pramoj	
37		General Kris Sivara	Royal Thai Army	37	21 April 1976	28 April 1976	Seni Pramoj	
35 (2)		General Tawich Seneewong na Ayutthaya	Royal Thai Army	37	28 April 1976	24 August 1976	Seni Pramoj	
38		Seni Pramoj	Civilian	37	27 August 1976	23 September 1976	Seni Pramoj	
39		Admiral Sangad Chaloryu	Royal Thai Navy	38	5 October 1976	6 October 1976	Seni Pramoj	
39		Admiral Sangad Chaloryu	Royal Thai Navy	39	22 October 1976	20 October 1977	Thanin Kraivichien	
40		General Lek Neawmalee	Royal Thai Army	40	12 November 1977	11 August 1977	Kriangsak Chamanan	
41		General Kriangsak Chamanan	Royal Thai Army	40	11 August 1977	11 May 1979	Kriangsak Chamanan	
42		General Prem Tinsulanonda	Royal Thai Army	41	24 May 1979	3 March 1980	Kriangsak Chamanan	
42		General Prem Tinsulanonda	Royal Thai Army	42	21 March 1980	19 March 1983	Prem Tinsulanonda	
42		General Prem Tinsulanonda	Royal Thai Army	43	7 May 1983	5 August 1986	Prem Tinsulanonda	
43		Air Chief Marshal Panieng Karntarat	Royal Thai Air Force	44	11 August 1986	3 August 1988	Prem Tinsulanonda	
44 (1)		General Chatichai Choonhavan	Royal Thai Army	45	4 August 1988	29 March 1990	Chatichai Choonhavan	
45 (1)		General Chavalit Yongchaiyudh	Royal Thai Army	45	30 March 1990	21 June 1990	Chatichai Choonhavan	
44 (2,3)		General Chatichai Choonhavan	Royal Thai Army	45	21 June 1990	9 December 1990	Chatichai Choonhavan	
44 (2,3)		General Chatichai Choonhavan	Royal Thai Army	46	14 December 1990	23 February 1991	Chatichai Choonhavan	
46		Admiral Praphat Kritsanajun	Royal Thai Navy	47	6 March 1991	22 March 1992	Anand Panyarachun	
47		General Suchinda Kraprayoon	Royal Thai Army	48	17 April 1992	24 May 1992	Suchinda Kraprayoon	
48		General Banjob Bunnag	Royal Thai Army	49	18 June 1992	23 September 1992	Anand Panyarachun	
49		General Vijit Sukmak	Royal Thai Army	50	29 September 1992	13 July 1995	Chuan Leekpai	
45 (2,3)		General Chavalit Yongchaiyudh	Royal Thai Army	51	13 July 1995	24 November 1996	Banharn Silpa-archa	
45 (2,3)		General Chavalit Yongchaiyudh	Royal Thai Army	52	29 November 1996	8 September 1997	Chavalit Yongchaiyudh	
50		Chuan Leekpai	Civilian	53	14 September 1997	5 February 2001	Chuan Leekpai	
		General Chavalit Yongchaiyudh	Royal Thai Army	54	17 February 2001	3 October 2002	Thaksin Shinawatra	
		General Chavalit Yongchaiyudh	Royal Thai Army	54	17 February 2001	3 October 2002	Thaksin Shinawatra	45 (4)
51 (1)		General Thammarak Isarangkura na Ayudhaya	Royal Thai Army	54	3 October 2002	9 March 2004	Thaksin Shinawatra	
52		General Chettha Thanajaro	Royal Thai Army	54	10 March 2004	5 October 2004	Thaksin Shinawatra	
53		General Sampan Boonyanan	Royal Thai Army	54	6 October 2004	11 March 2005	Thaksin Shinawatra	
51 (2)		General Thammarak Isarangkura na Ayudhaya	Royal Thai Army	55	11 March 2005	19 September 2006	Thaksin Shinawatra	
54		General Boonrod Somthat	Royal Thai Army	56	9 October 2006	5 February 2008	Surayud Chulanont	
55		Samak Sundaravej	Civilian	57	6 February 2008	9 September 2008	Samak Sundaravej	
56		Somchai Wongsawat	Civilian	58	24 September 2008	2 December 2008	Somchai Wongsawat	
57 (1)		General Prawit Wongsuwan	Royal Thai Army	59	20 December 2008	9 August 2011	Abhisit Vejjajiva	
58		General Yuthasak Sasiprapha	Royal Thai Army	60	9 August 2011	18 January 2012	Yingluck Shinawatra	
59		Air Chief Marshal Sukampol Suwannathat	Royal Thai Air Force	60	18 January 2012	30 June 2013	Yingluck Shinawatra	
60		Yingluck Shinawatra	Civilian	60	30 June 2013	7 May 2014	Yingluck Shinawatra	
57 (2)		General Prawit Wongsuwan	Royal Thai Army	61	30 August 2014	10 July 2019	Prayut Chan-o-cha	
61		General Prayut Chan-o-cha	Royal Thai Army	62	10 July 2019	1 September 2023	Prayut Chan-o-cha	
62		Sutin Klungsang	Civilian	63	1 September 2023	3 September 2024	Srettha Thavisin	
63		Phumtham Wechayachai	Civilian	64	3 September 2024	30 June 2025	Paetongtarn Shinawatra	
—		General Natthaphon Narkphanit	Royal Thai Army	64	30 June 2025	19 September 2025	Paetongtarn Shinawatra	
64		General Natthaphon Narkphanit	Royal Thai Army	65	19 September 2025	30 March 2026	Anutin Charnvirakul	
65		Lieutenant General Adul Boonthamcharoen	Royal Thai Army	66	30 March 2026	Incumbent	Anutin Charnvirakul	

== See also ==
- Ministry of Defence
