= Phahonphonphayuhasena =

Phahonphonphayuhasena (Thai: พหลพลพยุหเสนา) is a Thai noble title, granted to high-ranking military officers.

People who held the title include:

- Phraya Phahonphonphayuhasena (Kim), held the title with the rank phra from 1885 to 1895, and phraya from 1895
- Phraya Phahonphonphayuhasena (Arun Chatrakul), held the title from 1900 to 1903, later became Chaophraya Bodindechanuchit
- Phraya Phahonphonphayuhasena (Nop Phahonyothin), held the title from 1903 to 1913
- Phraya Phahonphonphayuhasena (Phot Phahonyothin), held the title from 1931
