= Kriangsak Chamanan =

Prime Minister of Thailand from 1977 to 1980

General Kriangsak Chamanan PCh MPCh MVM
- เกรียงศักดิ์ ชมะนันทน์
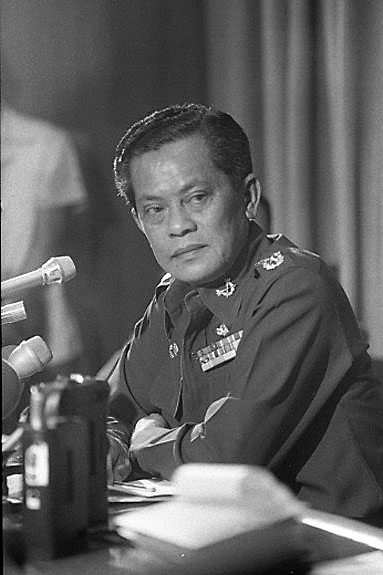
- Kriangsak in 1976

15th Prime Minister of Thailand
- In office 11 November 1977 – 3 March 1980
- Monarch: Bhumibol Adulyadej
- Preceded by: Thanin Kraivichien; Sangad Chaloryu (de facto)
- Succeeded by: Prem Tinsulanonda

Minister of Defence
- In office 11 August 1977 – 11 May 1979
- Prime Minister: Himself
- Preceded by: Lek Neawmalee
- Succeeded by: Prem Tinsulanonda

Minister of Interior
- In office 12 November 1976 – 11 August 1980
- Prime Minister: Himself
- Preceded by: Samak Sundaravej
- Succeeded by: Lek Neawmalee

Supreme Commander of the Armed Forces
- In office 1 October 1977 – 30 September 1978
- Preceded by: Kamol Techatungka
- Succeeded by: Serm Na Nakorn

Personal details
- Born: Somchit Chamanan; 17 December 1917 Nakhon Chai Si, Tawantok, Siam (now Mueang Samut Sakhon, Samut Sakhon, Thailand)
- Died: 23 December 2003 (aged 86) King Chulalongkorn Memorial Hospital, Pathum Wan, Bangkok, Thailand
- Spouse: Wirat Chamanan
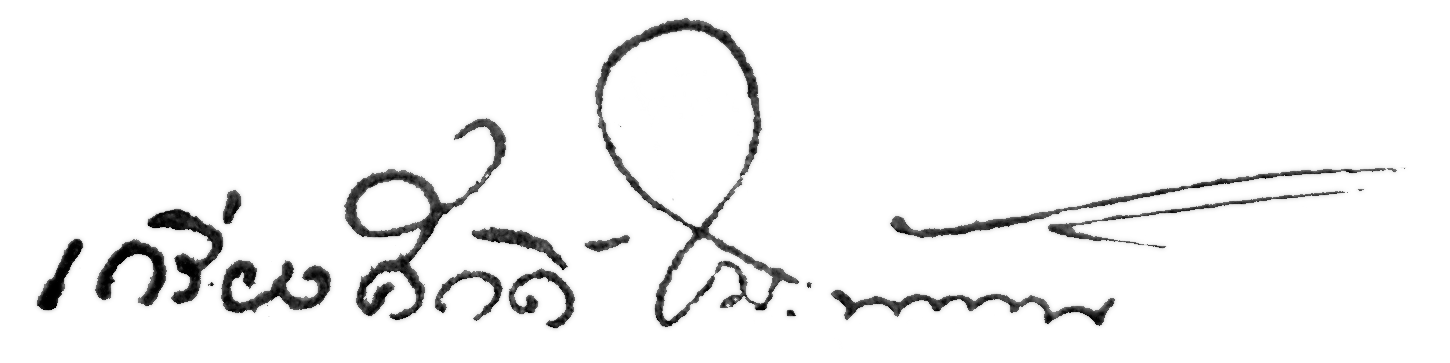
- Signature

Military service
- Allegiance: Thailand
- Branch/service: Royal Thai Army
- Years of service: 1940–1980
- Rank: General; Admiral; Air Chief Marshal
- Commands: Supreme Commander
- Battles/wars: World War II; Korean War

Kriangsak Chamanan (Thai: เกรียงศักดิ์ ชมะนันทน์, pronounced [kria̯ŋ.sàk tɕʰā.má(ʔ).nān]; 17 December 1917 – 23 December 2003) was the 15th prime minister of Thailand, serving from 1977 to 1980. His tenure began when he assumed power following the October 1977 Thai coup d'état, and ended with his resignation in 1980. He concurrently served as Supreme Commander of the Armed Forces from 1977 to 1978.

Born in Samut Sakhon to a wealthy business family, Kriangsak attended the prestigious Chulachomklao Royal Military Academy and trained as a professional soldier. During World War II, he was posted in the occupied Shan State, and fought against the French in the Franco-Thai War as platoon leader. During the Korean War, he served as the commander of Infantry Battalion III, which fought in the Battle of Pork Chop Hill, making him one of only a few non-citizen officers to receive the U.S. Legion of Merit. Kriangsak was promoted to the position of general in 1973, and army chief of staff a year later. Following a "democratic experiment" in Thailand that ended with the 6 October 1976 massacre, Kriangsak helped Admiral Sangad Chaloryu carry out a military coup that installed judge Thanin Kraivichien as prime minister. As a moderate pragmatist opposed to Thanin's extreme right-wing policies, Kriangsak ousted him in a coup d'etat in 1977.

Taking office as prime minister at a time when Thailand's relations with its communist neighbours had deteriorated due to the previous administration's confrontational policies, Kriangsak pursued a policy of détente, successfully normalising diplomatic relationships with Thailand's former enemies while rejuvenating relations with the United States. In the domestic sphere, Kriangsak reversed Thanin's repression of civil liberties, defusing the internal communist insurgency by granting amnesty to political detainees and any communist cadres who chose to return. He also partially restored Thai democracy, holding a general election in 1979. After a decrease in public support due to difficulties in dealing with the 1970s energy crisis, Kriangsak resigned the premiership in 1980, and is often noted as the only coup leader to voluntarily resign.

In 1985, dissatisfied with his successor, Prem Tinsulanonda, Kriangsak staged a failed coup against Prem, after which he was pardoned. In his retirement, he was invited to the InterAction Council of Former Heads of State and Government in solving various global issues, becoming the only Thai prime minister and one of fewer than three from Asia at the time of his membership. After suffering several years of declining health, Kriangsak died in 2003.

Kriangsak is credited with "steering Thailand to democracy" in a time when communist insurgents were rampant internally and neighbouring countries turned to communist rule following the communist takeover of Vietnam: South Vietnam (by the Viet Cong), Laos (by the Pathet Lao), and Cambodia (by the Khmer Rouge). Due to his landmark foreign and domestic developmental policies, Kriangsak is generally considered one of the greatest prime ministers of Thailand.

== Early life and career ==
Kriangsak Chamanan was born on 17 December 1917 in Mahachai Subdistrict, Mueang Samut Sakhon District, Samut Sakhon Province, a prominent Chinese trading port to the southwest of Bangkok. He was born to a wealthy business family that ran the Mahachai trading company, which dealt in importing and exporting goods between Thailand and the West and Japan. Mahachai in the 1800s and 1900s was one of Thailand's largest trading ports and grew to become the first city district with its own local government in 1897.

=== Education ===
From age six to twelve, Kriangsak attended Samut Sakhon Wittayalai and later Patumkongka School. After graduating from primary school, Kriangsak moved to Bangkok to attend the prestigious Amnuay Silpa School (Its alumni include six prime ministers of Thailand) where he excelled academically.

He later attended Chulachomklao Royal Military Academy, known for its intense training program and one of the lowest admission rates among learning institutions in Thailand, until he graduated in 1938. During his time in the army, he further attended the Thai Army Command and General Staff College (CGSC) and the Thailand National Defence College.

After his time in the Korean War, he also got a scholarship to attend the United States Army Command and General Staff College at Fort Leavenworth, Kansas, a graduate school for United States Army and sister service officers, interagency representatives, and international military officers. He became the only Thai person to be included in the Fort Leavenworth Hall of Fame.

== Military career ==
Kriangsak fought in the Korean War as a commander of the Thai Army in the 21st Infantry Regiment, which earned the nickname "Little Tigers" for their valour. He showed exemplary skills as a major, playing a pivotal role in defending Pork Chop Hill. On 15 March 1953, by direction of the US president and under the provision of the 1942 Act of the US Congress, then-lieutenant Kriangsak became one among few non-U.S. military personnel to be awarded the Legion of Merit (Officer degree) for exceptionally meritorious conduct in the performance of outstanding services.

He became a full general in 1973, and army chief of staff a year later. In 1974, he also secretly brokered a prisoner exchange with the Burmese government, in which the opium warlord Khun Sa was ransomed for the freedom of two Soviet doctors whom Khun Sa's followers had kidnapped.

In 1977, Kriangsak was part of the National Administrative Reform Council (NARC), which staged a successful coup d'état against Prime Minister Thanin Kraivichien. Thanin himself had come into power the year before, after another coup by Sangad Chaloryu suspended the constitutional monarchy. The NARC was composed entirely of what contemporaneous press reports characterised as moderate military leaders, not from the extreme right wing. It was distinguished from previous military ruling groups "as an effort to institutionalize power relationships within the military in contrast to the personal factions and cliques which entered the political arena in the past." Kriangsak was then asked to become prime minister, partially against his will, according to his wife Khunying Virat Chomanan.

== Prime Minister of Thailand (1977–1980) ==
=== Coup d'état and ascension ===
Prior to Kriangsak, the Thanin Kraivichien administration had spiraled the country into a perilous state of civil war. Incidents involving the Communist Party of Thailand (CPT) in rural areas across Thailand and border clashes with Cambodia and Laos incidents were becoming increasingly frequent. The administration's forceful suppressive policy had the perverse effect of increasing the CPT's popularity. Furthermore, members and close aides of the royal family also became targets of attacks by the communist insurgents, including the assassination of the queen's secretary and a bomb explosion near the king while he was visiting the south of Thailand. The country-wide deterioration and increased activity of communist insurgents induced reactions within the Thai armed forces. The first attempt to overthrow the Thanin administration took place in March 1977 and was led by General Chalad Hiranyasiri. However, it was unsuccessful and Chalad was executed on Thanin's order. With increasing unrest, the Thanin government was finally successfully overthrown on 20 October 1977 when a clique of Thai military officers known as the Young Turks pressured Kriangsak and General Sangad Chaloyu, who had led the 1976 coup that ousted the elected civilian government of Seni Pramoj and appointed the royal favorite Thanin as prime minister. Kriangsak was later appointed the new prime minister by a majority vote through both the National Assembly and the NARC.

As prime minister, Kriangsak moved to moderate and neutralize his predecessor Thanin's severe measures, which had driven young Thai intellectuals from multiple universities to join the communist insurgency in the countryside. In 1978, in a major risk to his political position with his right leaning supporting base, he submitted an amnesty bill to the National Legislative Assembly to release the Bangkok 18, a group of leftist students and labor activist jailed after the Thammasat University massacre that preceded the 1976 coup. The move greatly bolstered his international position as a Southeast Asian humanitarian leader and was noted in commemorations from many international bodies. He also started a successful amnesty program for communists as part of a reconciliation policy.

Kriangsak is widely credited with defusing the long-running communist insurgency in northern Thailand. He was reported to have met in 1979 with Deng Xiaoping, then supreme leader of the People's Republic of China, allowing China to ship arms to the rebel Khmer Rouge in Cambodia in exchange for the PRC withdrawing its support for the communist insurgency in Thailand. These reports were confirmed contemporaneously by the Sunday Times and wire services. However, claims of a deal involving the Khmer Rouge was denied by the Thai government, which cites his policy of reunification and offers of amnesty as the primary reason for the decline of the communist insurgency. The other benefit of the deal with China for Thailand was that it would not have Vietnamese troops on its border. In the same way Kriangsak had secret deals with rebel armies across the border in Burma, which provided a buffer zone against Burmese aggression.

=== Domestic and developmental policy ===
Kriangsak's landmark developmental policies include the founding of Eastern Seaboard through the founding of PTT, facilitating the building of a deep-sea port in Laem Chabang and negotiating bilateral trade agreements between Thailand and Japan through Takeo Fukuda to include Thailand in the flying geese paradigm. Kriangsak founded the Petroleum Authority of Thailand, transforming it into PTT in a merger between three fragmented state-owned energy companies, serving as a major economic and industrial stimulus in the rise of Thailand secondary production economy in the 1980s and 1990s. Moreover, the founding of PTT also served to lessen the reliance on the global energy market, which was affected by a severe global oil price crisis in the 1970s. His other notable works include the founding of the Chatuchak Market which also helped to solve the Din Daeng Garbage Mountain issue, the Village Health Volunteers organization which acts as a crucial model in Thailand public primary care, the founding of the Ministry of Science and Technology, the passing of the first-ever bills to include tourism in the government economic development plans and the upgrading of the Tourism Authority of Thailand from organizational level to state level, the passing of the current consumer protection acts and organizations and the founding of Sukhothai Thammathirat Open University.

=== International relations and foreign policy ===
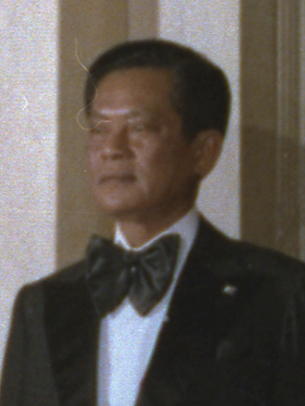
Kriangsak in 1979

One of Kriangsak's main accomplishments was normalising and improving foreign relations. He led rapprochements towards the neighboring countries of Cambodia, Lao PDR, Vietnam, and Myanmar (known as the CLMV countries) and fostered closer relationships with Singapore, Indonesia and Malaysia. Moreover, he was one of the few leaders of a non-communist country to visit the People's Republic of China and the Soviet Union and to have fostered diplomatic relationships with both countries. Kriangsak visited Beijing in late March 1978. PRC leader Deng Xiaoping returned the favour in November 1978 and in a significant public moment visited Kriangsak's private house and discussed political issues both on national television and privately.

In April 1975, Thailand was the first country in Southeast Asia to recognize the communist Khmer Rouge regime in Phnom Penh. In October the two countries agreed in principle to resume diplomatic and economic relations; the agreement was formalized in June 1976, when they also agreed to erect border markers in poorly defined border areas.

Meanwhile, the withdrawal of all American troops from Thailand by July 1976 paved the way for the Thai-Vietnamese agreement on normalizing relations in August. In January 1978, Bangkok and Hanoi signed an accord on trade and economic and technical cooperation, agreeing also to exchange ambassadors, reopen aviation links, resolve all problems through negotiations, and consult on the question of delimiting sea boundaries. Progress toward improved relations with the Indochinese states came to an abrupt halt, however, after Vietnam invaded Cambodia in December 1978, and in January 1979 installed in Phnom Penh a new communist regime friendly to Hanoi. This invasion not only provoked a Chinese attack on Vietnam in February 1979 but also posed a threat to Thailand's security. Kriangsak could no longer rely on Cambodia as a buffer against Vietnamese power. Bangkok was forced to assume the role of a frontline state against a resurgent communist Vietnam, which had 300,000 troops in Cambodia and Laos. The Kriangsak government began increasing its defense capabilities. While visiting Washington in February 1979, Kriangsak asked for and received reassurances of military support from the United States. His government also launched a major diplomatic offensive to press for the withdrawal of all Vietnamese forces from Cambodia and for continued international recognition of Democratic Kampuchea under Pol Pot's Khmer Rouge regime. As part of that offensive, Kriangsak also journeyed to Moscow in March 1979, the first visit ever by a Thai prime minister, to explain the Thai position on the Cambodian question and to reassure the Soviets that Thailand's anti-Vietnamese position was neither anti-Soviet nor pro-Chinese. Such reassurances were believed to be necessary in view of Vietnamese accusations that Thailand collaborated with China and the United States in aiding and abetting the Khmer Rouge forces against the Heng Samrin regime.

The Thai offensive, backed by Bangkok's ASEAN partners, was rewarded in a United Nations (UN) General Assembly resolution adopted in November 1979. The resolution called for immediate withdrawal of all foreign forces from Cambodia, asked all nations to refrain from interfering in, or staging acts of aggression against, Cambodia, and called on the UN secretary general to explore the possibility of an international conference on Cambodia.

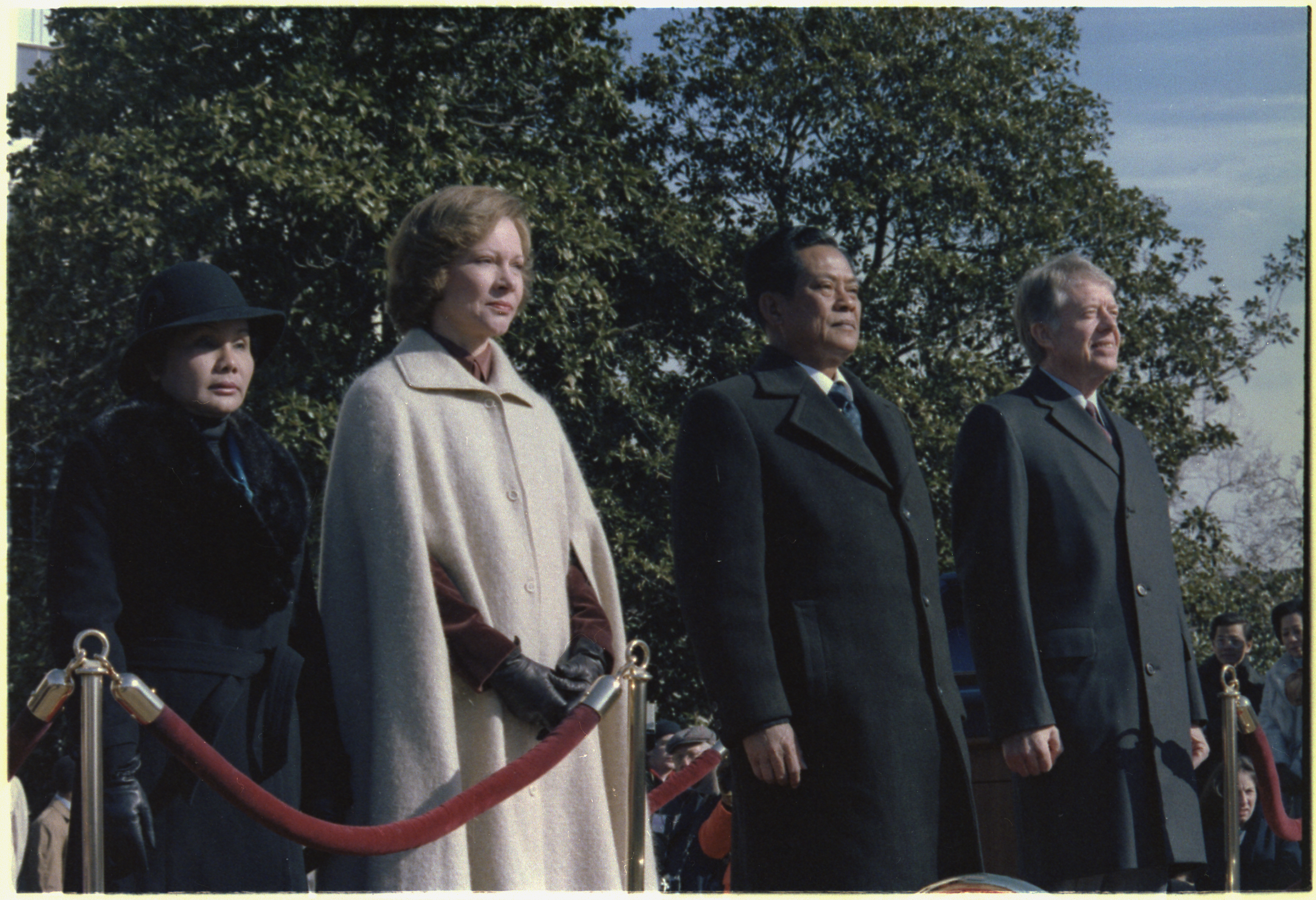
Khunying Virat Chomanan, Rosalynn Carter, Kriangsak Chomanan and Jimmy Carter at Arrival Ceremony for the Prime Minister of Thailand in 1979

Kriangsak also made significant economic deals with regional neighbors. When the Malaysian prime minister Tun Hussein Onn arrived in Thailand to sign an oil treaty over drilling rights along the Thai-Malaysian border and in the Gulf of Thailand, both flew to the northern Thai city of Chiang Mai to sign the pact. While in a convoy on the way from the Chiang Mai Airport, Kriangsak ordered his limousine to stop and took Tun Hussein to a noodle shop to enjoy the "best beef noodles in Thailand". When Hussein became agitated about being late for the signing, Kriangsak reportedly took out the agreement and signed it on the spot, asking his guest: "Now would you care for some more noodles?"

Despite taking power in a military coup, The Times and The New York Times reported that Kriangsak was known for leaning towards democracy. He enlisted more civilians to top jobs than any previous regime, granted amnesty to communists and dissidents who were jailed for fighting a military crackdown in 1976, promulgated the country's 12th constitution, and set up a timetable for full parliamentary democracy in 1979. But this democratic step reportedly cost him the support of the military.

==== Relations with the United States of America ====
Prior to Kriangsak's time in office, with America clearly in retreat from military involvement on the Southeast Asian mainland, Thai self-preservation dictated a policy of realignment. Within days of the congressional cutoff of American bombing in Cambodia in August 1973, the U.S. and Thai governments announced the first drawdown of U.S. personnel in Thailand. The fall of the regime of Thanom Kittikachorn and Praphas Charusathien on 15 October 1973, added further impetus, because the student protestors, who had sparked the revolt, demanded, among other things, a more independent foreign policy for Thailand, including the removal of American bases.

In May 1974, U.S. forces in Thailand were cut to 34,000 (compared with a wartime high of 50,000 in December 1972), and statements by Thai officials clearly indicated an inclination toward complete U.S. military withdrawal. Concurrently, Thailand sought to add balance to its diplomacy by improving relations with Hanoi and Moscow. Diplomatic recognition was extended to Romania, Outer Mongolia, and Czechoslovakia, a North Korean trade delegation visited Bangkok, and relations with China continued to warm. During 1973-1976, a consensus developed within the Thai foreign policy elite, favoring decreased reliance upon the United States and returning to a more traditional Thai stance of establishing cordial relations with as many contending powers as possible as the most efficacious means of protecting Thailand's sovereignty.

The governments of both Seni Promoj and Kukrit Pramoj sought complete withdrawal of American bases, improved relations with North Vietnam, and diplomatic relations with China. In late March 1975, the Thai government decided to cut the lifeline of the Lon Nol regime by stating that the U.S. government "had no right" to transship ammunition through Thailand. As the April denouement approached in Vietnam and Cambodia, Thailand's survival instincts dictated increased public resistance to U.S. security policies in Indochina. American policymakers in the immediate aftermath of Saigon's fall made public statements indicating that previous commitments to the defense of Thailand might no longer be binding. When Secretary of Defense Schlesinger was asked whether the U.S. would continue to be obligated to defend Thailand from external attack, he replied: "[I] would have to consult my lawyers." Furthermore, Secretary Kissinger omitted Thailand from a listing of defense commitments in Asia. High American officials seemed to be publicly undermining what little deterrent value remained in the U.S.–Thai security relationship. Perhaps the absolute nadir in U.S.–Thai security relations was reached in the closing days of 1975, when Senate Majority Leader Mike Mansfield urged the abrogation of the Manila Treaty as well as closing out American economic aid to Thailand. In June 1975, former Foreign Minister Thanat Khoman clearly elucidated the new policies to be followed by Thailand in disengaging from the U.S.-Thai alliance:

"The present government is committed to following a policy of equidistance—Thailand should try to keep on the best possible terms with major powers—the U.S., Soviet Union, China, Japan, Western and Eastern Europe. If we allow one power to station troops here, we may get into trouble with another large power, or one of the smaller powers. It was not my personal feelings, but the resolution of the American Congress banning U.S. forces from taking part in overseas operations. If they can't perform military duties why are they here? As tourists? It doesn't make sense. We have seen the sad situation in South Vietnam and Cambodia of the U.S. Congress refusing credits to those countries. Executive agreements are completely meaningless if Congress is not willing to go ahead. What are promises worth if we are unsure of the position of the [American] legislative branch? If the U.S. Congress was to pass a resolution tomorrow that if Thailand were attacked the U.S. would join Thailand's defense, I would be the first to advocate that American forces remain. At present, however, they are a liability."

The year 1976 was dominated by the final withdrawal of American forces from the bases in Thailand. There was a feeble American attempt to maintain a residual force, but this was rejected with a certain amount of political fanfare by Kukrit Pramoj. The U.S. response to the Thai government announcement on 20 March that U.S. military activity in Thailand must end "forthwith" was a forthright "We don't stay where we are not wanted." In the period 1973–1976, Thailand had rapidly readjusted its pattern of international relations: moving away from the U.S. (but without dissolving the relationship entirely); moving toward China (but without becoming a client); and seeking outright accommodation with Hanoi along with limited advances toward the Soviet Union.

The policy of moving away from dependence on the United States gradually eliminated American involvement in Thai politics. But when Thanin took over, his policy of suppressing communist activities within Thailand and limiting external communist expansion toward Thailand's borders encouraged a new series of American involvements. Yet, even though the policies of the two countries coincided, the American involvement in Thailand during this period did not quite reach the same high level as in the previous period. In 1977, SEATO was dissolved and the U.S. cut back its aid programs to Thailand.

Kriangsak came to power in November 1977 and quickly adopted a new and actively independent foreign policy, compared to Thanin's rigid stance. He travelled extensively, visiting the People's Republic of China and the Soviet Union, in addition to the United States. With his own unique style of "survival diplomacy," Kriangsak tried to reestablish more balanced relations with the rest of the world. However, he also succeeded to a certain extent in convincing the U.S. government of Thailand's strategic importance and persuaded the U.S. to adopt a more "credible" policy toward Thailand. It was becoming apparent that it was in the interest of the United States to help Thailand and ASEAN develop and that bilaterally, the United States could afford to improve close relations with Thailand while playing an important role in encouraging indigenous regionalism capable of coping with political and security problems.

Toward the end of his premiership, Kriangsak was able to restore close and friendly relations with the United States. Although anti-Americanism still existed, it was at a low level, compared to what it had been during the Thanom-Prapas period.

==== Relations with neighboring states ====
Kriangsak's position toward Vietnam following the December 1978 invasion of Cambodia was remarkably steadfast and obscures the fact that Thai foreign policy in 1973–1978 was based on diplomatic flexibility and accommodation with Hanoi and Phnom Penh. This basic policy was present even during the stridently anti-communist government of Thanin Kraivichien (October 1976–October 1977). Immediately after the October 1976 coup, which reasserted the military's role in Thai politics. Kriangsak, as secretary-general of the National Administrative Reform Council, reiterated the policy of détente: "We want good relations with Laos, Vietnam, and Cambodia" and "our policy towards China has not changed." Clashes with the Khmer Rouge occurred repeatedly along the border, as the Khmer Rouge involved themselves in border conflicts with Vietnam, Laos, and Thailand simultaneously. Thai policy in responding to the Khmer Rouge differed markedly from Vietnamese responses to similar incidents. Whereas the Thais never ceased protesting the frequent border violations, Thailand nevertheless continued its pursuit of a diplomatic solution. In contrast, the Vietnamese response to Khmer Rouge activity was entirely military: escalation and counterstrikes by both sides led eventually to full-scale war and invasion. Thailand, especially under Kriangsak, calculated that the most serious threat to Democratic Kampuchea came from Vietnam and that the Khmer Rouge must eventually come to terms with Thailand if they were to have any chance whatever of survival. In response to a series of raids across the Thai border, he stated that the Thai government would accelerate its efforts to establish better relations with Cambodia. Bangkok even provided possible rationales for the border violations. such as confusion and poor communication between the border area and Phnom Penh, or, alternately, inaccurate maps. Thailand went out of its way to play down the border incidents. As Vietnam and Democratic Kampuchea engaged in conflict, both antagonists sought better relations with Thailand. Military security along the Thai–Cambodian border improved slowly after Thai Foreign Minister Upadit Pachariyangkun's "goodwill visit" to Phnom Penh in late January 1978, which resulted in an agreement to exchange ambassadors. During 1978, Thailand displayed an ability to fine-tune its foreign policy; even while the border raids into its territory continued in February, government spokesmen reiterated the contention that the border situation had improved. When fifty Thais were killed, Thailand sent a "report" rather than a "protest" note, because "Cambodian leaders might not know what is happening on the border."

Kriangsak also strengthened relations with the United States, and was warmly received in his first state visit to the White House with U.S. President Jimmy Carter on 6 February 1979. According to the internal talking points prepared for Carter, the President cited the close historical relations as well as economic and regional cooperation in Southeast Asia.

=== Honorable resignation ===
Kriangsak voluntarily resigned in February 1980, telling parliament that he no longer felt he had the support of the public. He was the first and only leader of a coup in Thailand ever to resign voluntarily, and was celebrated for his decision, often cited in comparison to many of Thailand's past military governments. It was reported that the primary cause for his loss of support was rising prices, particularly of oil, electricity and other commodities. "I have decided to resign the prime ministership so that democracy can be maintained," Kriangsak told a special session of parliament, which had gathered to debate his governments policies before a vote of confidence. He said his intention was "to open the way for other capable people to administer the country."

He was succeeded by General Prem Tinsulanonda, his former longtime aide. In 1981 he re-entered politics at the head of a new political party, the National Democratic Party, which emerged as the only credible political opposition to Prem.

== Humanitarian principles ==
=== The case of the Cambodian refugees ===
Large influxes of Cambodian refugees took place between 1979 and 1980, after Vietnamese troops invaded Cambodia and installed the Heng Samrin regime in place of Pol Pot's Khmer Rouge in December 1978. Fleeing the devastating war, starvation and disease, 200,000 Cambodian refugees were estimated to be on the border attempting to enter Thailand. On 18 October 1979, Kriangsak visited the Thai–Cambodian border. Two days later, taking a major political risk, he altered the government's policy towards the refugees, declaring a new "open door" policy granting temporary asylum to Cambodian refugees. Thailand would still not recognize them as refugees but placed them in "holding centers". On 22 October, a Thai colonel contacted UNHCR and said that the Kriangsak government had decided to additionally admit 90,000 Cambodians who were situated on the border. The Thai military planned to begin relocating them to a site near the town of Sa Kaeo within two days. Sa Kaeo Holding Center was about 64 kilometres west of the border near the town of Sa Kaeo and 209 kilometres by road from east of Bangkok.

==== Refoulement of Cambodian refugees ====
Also during Kriangsak's premiership, it was speculated by an official that Thailand's government carried out the forcible repatriation of up to 45,000 Cambodian refugees who were forcibly expelled from the country by having them walk down a steep slope and over a minefield in one of the worst refoulements in history with over 3000 refugees dying in the process and those that refused claimed to be shot by Thai soldiers.

== Death ==
Kriangsak died on 23 December 2003, aged 86.

== Honours ==
received the following royal decorations in the Honours System of Thailand:

- 1978 - Knight Grand Cross of the Most Illustrious Order of Chula Chom Klao
- 1974 - Knight Grand Cordon of the Most Exalted Order of the White Elephant
- 1968 - Knight Grand Cordon of the Most Noble Order of the Crown
- 1962 - Victory Medal - Pacific War
- 1953 - Victory Medal - Korean War
- 1978 - Freemen Safeguarding Medal, First Class
- 1968 - Border Service Medal
- 1953 - Chakra Mala Medal
- 1978 - Boy Scout Citation Medal of Vajira, First Class
- 1978 - King Bhumibol Adulyadej's Royal Cypher Medal, First Class

=== Foreign Honours ===
- USA :
  - Silver Star Medal (1952)
  - Officer of the Legion of Merit (1969)
- Malaysia :
  - Commander of the Order of Loyalty to the Crown of Malaysia (1967)
  - Honorary Grand Commander of the Order of the Defender of the Realm (1979)
- South Korea :
  - Order of National Security Merit, Tongil Medal (1977)
  - Recognised as foreign combatant in the Korean War on 60th anniversary of that conflict (2013)
- Philippines :
  - Grand Collar of the Order of Sikatuna (1978)
- UN :
  - United Nations Service Medal Korea (1953)

=== Unit Citation ===
- Army Presidential Unit Citation (1952)
- Presidential Unit Citation (South Korea)

== Citations ==
Political offices
Preceded by Thanin Kraivichien	Prime Minister of Thailand; 1977–1980	Succeeded by Prem Tinsulanonda
