= Chaophraya Bodindechanuchit (Arun Chatrakul) =

Member of the Thai royalty & nobility (1856–1921)

Field marshal Chaophraya Bodindechanuchit NR RV PChW MPCh MVM MR
- เจ้าพระยาบดินทรเดชานุชิต
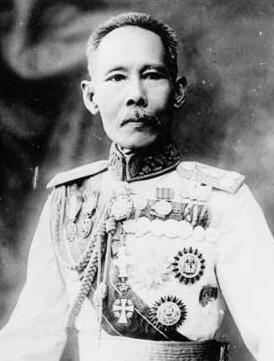
- Chao Phraya Bodindechanuchit (Mom Rajawongse Aroon Chatrakul)

Minister of War
- In office 1 April 1914 – 25 August 1921
- Monarch: Vajiravudh
- Preceded by: Prince Chirapravati Voradej
- Succeeded by: Chaophraya Bodindechanuchit (Yam Na Nakhon)

Personal details
- Born: MR Arun (Chatrakul); 14 April 1856
- Died: August 25, 1921 (aged 65)

Military service
- Allegiance: Siam
- Branch: Royal Thai Army
- Years of service: 1872–1921
- Rank: Field Marshal
- Battles/wars: World War I

Chaophraya Bodindechanuchit (Thai: เจ้าพระยาบดินทรเดชานุชิต), personal name Mom Rajawongse Arun Chatrakul (หม่อมราชวงศ์อรุณ ฉัตรกุล, 14 April 1856 – 25 August 1921), was a Royal Siamese Army officer who served as Minister of War under King Vajiravudh from 1914 to 1921.

== Biography ==
Mom Rajawongse Arun Chatrakul was born on 14 April 1856 and began military service in the royal guards in 1872 as a private assigned to the 6th Regiment and was promoted to private 1st class and then corporal of the 5th Regiment. (Note: Ranks are given as modern equivalents.) In 1878, he transferred to an artillery regiment. On 9 April 1889, Arun became adjutant of the cadet school division while being promoted to captain. In 1892, he became commander of the cadet school, and on 4 October of the same year, was promoted to major. On 14 November, he was assigned as royal aide-de-camp, and on the 21st, he was granted the noble title of Luang Sorawiset Dechawut, with a sakdina of 800. On 20 September 1898, he was promoted to Phra Sorawiset Dechawut, with a sakdina of 1,000. In 1899, he became commandant of the army command division, Bangkok military province and on 15 August of the same year, he was promoted to lieutenant colonel.

In August 1900, he became the Royal Army yokkrabat (quartermaster) and on 21 September of the same year, his title was promoted to Phraya Phahonphonphayuhasena, with a sakdina of 1,500. On 3 April 1901, he was promoted to colonel, and on 11 August of the same year, he became adjutant of the Army. On 14 May 1902, Arun was promoted to major general. On 6 August 1903, he became Deputy Commander of the Department of War, and on 15 May, his title was promoted to Phraya Siharat Dechochai, the traditional title of the head of Krom Asa Yai Khwa, with a sakdina of 10,000. On 20 September 1906, he was promoted to lieutenant general.

In December 1910, he became Assistant Minister of War. On 22 January 1912, he was promoted to General. In 1912, Arun was granted the rank and title of Chaophraya Bodindechanuchit, with a sakdina of 10,000. On 4 February 1914, he was appointed acting Minister of War. On 1 April 1914, he became Minister of War. On 30 December 1917, he was promoted to field marshal.

He was a member of King Vajiravudh's paramilitary movement the Wild Tiger Corps, and received the rank of major in 1915.

=== Later years ===
Following a lengthy period of illness from lung disease, Chaophraya Bodindechanuchit died on 25 August 1921 at 14:35, at the age of 65.

He was granted a 15-day royally sponsored funeral, with the use of a kot (a funerary urn reserved for royalty and high-ranking nobles), by King Vajiravudh, who personally came to offer funeral water at 16:00 the next day.

== Honours ==
- 1920 - Knight of The Ancient and Auspicious Order of the Nine Gems
- 1914 - Knight of the Ratana Varabhorn Order of Merit
- 1912 - Knight Grand Cross (First Class) of The Most Illustrious Order of Chula Chom Klao
- 1916 - Knight Grand Cordon (Special Class) of the Most Exalted Order of the White Elephant
- 1904 - Knight Grand Cross of the Most Noble Order of the Crown of Thailand
- 1918 - Knight Commander of the Honourable Order of Rama
- 1898 - Haw Campaign Medal
- 1919 - Dushdi Mala Medal Pin Service to the Nation (Military)
- 1893 - Chakra Mala Medal (1893)
- 1911 - King Chulalongkorn's Royal Cypher Medal, 3rd Class
- 1913 - King Vajiravudh's Royal Cypher Medal, 2nd Class
- 1910 - Commemorative Medal on the Occasion of the Silver Jubilee Celebrations of King Chulalongkorn's Reign
- 1897 - Commemorative Medal of the Royal State Visits to Europe of King Chulalongkorn
- 1903 - Commemorative Medal on the Occasion of the Accession to the Throne of King Chulalongkorn as Two Times of King King Phra Phutthaloetla Naphalai's Reign
- 1907 - Commemorative Medal on the Occasion of the Accession to the Throne of King Chulalongkorn as King Ramathibodi II's Reign
- 1908 - Commemorative Medal on the Occasion of the Longest Reign Celebrations of the Accession to the Throne of King Chulalongkorn
- 1911 - King Rama VI Coronation Medal

=== Foreign Honours ===
- Denmark :
  - 1902 - Commander of the Order of the Dannebrog
- Prussia :
  - 1905 - Order of the Red Eagle, 2nd Class with star

== Notes ==
Chaophraya Bodindechanuchit (Arun Chatrakul) House of Chatrakul Cadet branch of the House of Chakri Born: 14 April 1856 Died: 25 August 1921
Political offices
Preceded by Chirapravati Voradej	Minister of Defence; 1913 – 1921	Succeeded by Bodindechanuchit
Military offices
Preceded by Chirapravati Voradej	Minister of War; 1913 – 1921	Succeeded by Bodindechanuchit
