= Kris Sivara =

Thai general (1914–1976)

- กฤษณ์ สีวะรา
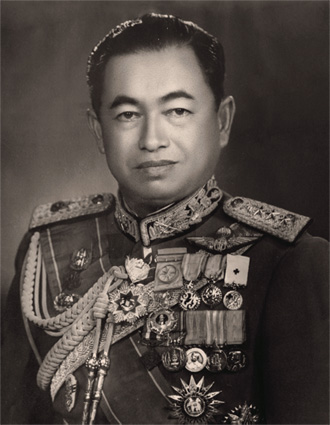

Minister of Defence
- In office 21 April 1976 – 28 April 1976
- Prime Minister: Seni Pramoj
- Preceded by: Pramarn Adireksarn
- Succeeded by: Tawich Seneewong

Supreme Commander of the Armed Forces
- In office 1 October 1974 – 30 September 1975
- Preceded by: Dawee Chullasapya
- Succeeded by: Sangad Chaloryu

Commander-in-chief of the Royal Thai Army
- In office 1 October 1973 – 30 September 1975
- Preceded by: Praphas Charusathien
- Succeeded by: Boonchai Bamroongpong

Personal details
- Born: March 24, 1914 Bangkok, Krung Thep, Siam (now Bangkok, Thailand)
- Died: April 28, 1976 (aged 62) Phramongkutklao Hospital, Phaya Thai, Bangkok, Thailand (now Ratchathewi, Bangkok, Thailand)
- Party: Social Justice Party
- Other political affiliations: United Thai People's Party
- Spouse: Surai Sivara
- Education: Chulachomklao Royal Military Academy

Military service
- Allegiance: Thailand
- Branch/service: Royal Thai Army
- Rank: General
- Commands: Commander-in-Chief of the Royal Thai Army; Supreme Commander of the Armed Forces; 1st Infantry Regiment, King's Close Bodyguard; Commanding General of the 1st Army Area; Commanding General of the 2nd Army Area
- Battles/wars: World War II; Franco-Thai War; Pacific War; Burma campaign

Kris Sivara (Thai: กฤษณ์ สีวะรา, RTGS: Krit Siwara, alternatively transcribed as Srivara) (27 March 1914 – 28 April 1976) was a military officer of the Royal Thai Army, a member of the Thai Cabinet, and deputy commander-in-chief of the Royal Thai Army during the violent crackdown on democracy protesters on 14 October 1973. He was later promoted to Commander in Chief of the Royal Thai Army from 1973 to 1975.

== Career ==
During the Burma Campaign in World War II, Kris served as a company commander in a Phayap Army battalion under the command of Major Sarit Thanarat.

Kris was appointed Deputy Minister of Education by Field Marshal Thanom Kittikachorn in his 1969 government. On 23 November 1970, he was switched to Deputy Minister of Defence (Thanom was both premier and minister of defence). The government fell on 17 November 1971 after Thanom led a coup that overthrew his own government and abrogated the 1968 constitution. Thanom appointed Kris Minister of Industry in his subsequent junta.

Kris played a pivotal role in the 14 October democracy movement of 1973. Kris served as Deputy Army Commander in the face of massive public demonstrations against the "three tyrants": Colonel Narong Kittikachorn, Army Commander Field Marshal Praphas Charusathien, and Prime Minister and Supreme Commander Thanom Kittikachorn. On the evening of 14 October, the police and army began shooting at demonstrators, killing at least 70. Narong shot into the crowds from a helicopter. Thanom and Praphas resigned from their political roles, but continued to lead the military. They ordered more troops to confront the remaining demonstrators, but were blocked by Kris. Thanom and Narong then resigned from their military positions. The king then appointed Sanya Dharmasakti as premier. Kris was named defense minister in 1976, but died a week later in April 1976. His death has been called "...sudden and strange..."

Kris's role in the events was countered by Narong in a 2003 book. Narong blamed Kris, among others, for the violence. The book was strongly criticised by former student leaders.

The army's Kris Sivara Camp in Sakon Nakhon Province is named after him.

== Honours ==
- 1966 – Knight Grand Cordon of the Most Exalted Order of the White Elephant
- 1963 – Knight Grand Cordon of the Most Noble Order of the Crown of Thailand
- 1969 – Dame Grand Commander of the Most Illustrious Order of Chula Chom Klao
- 1962 – Victory Medal – Pacific War
- 1974 – Freemen Safeguarding Medal, First Class
- 1934 – Safeguarding the Constitution Medal
- 1969 – Border Service Medal
- 1947 – Chakra Mala Medal
- 1950 – King Ananda Mahidol's Royal Cypher Medal, 4th class
- 1953 – King Bhumibol Adulyadej's Royal Cypher Medal, 3rd class
- 1953 – King Rama VII Coronation Medal
- 1953 – King Rama IX Coronation Medal
- 1953 – Commemorative Medal on the Occasion of the 150th Years of Rattanakosin Celebration
- Red Cross Medal of Appreciation, First Class

=== Foreign honours ===
- Malaysia :
  - 1964 – Companion of the Order of the Defender of the Realm
  - 1975 – Honorary Grand Commander of the Order of Loyalty to the Crown of Malaysia
- Belgium :
  - 1964 – Grand Cross of the Order of Leopold
- Taiwan :
  - 1969 – Grand Cordon of the Order of the Cloud and Banner
- Ethiopian Empire :
  - 1968 – Grand Cross of the Order of the Star of Ethiopia
- South Korea :
  - 1969 – Tongil Medal of the Order of National Security Merit
- South Vietnam :
  - 1969 – Kim Khanh Decoration, First Class
- UK :
  - 1972 – Knight Commander of the Order of the British Empire (Military) (KBE)
- Indonesia :
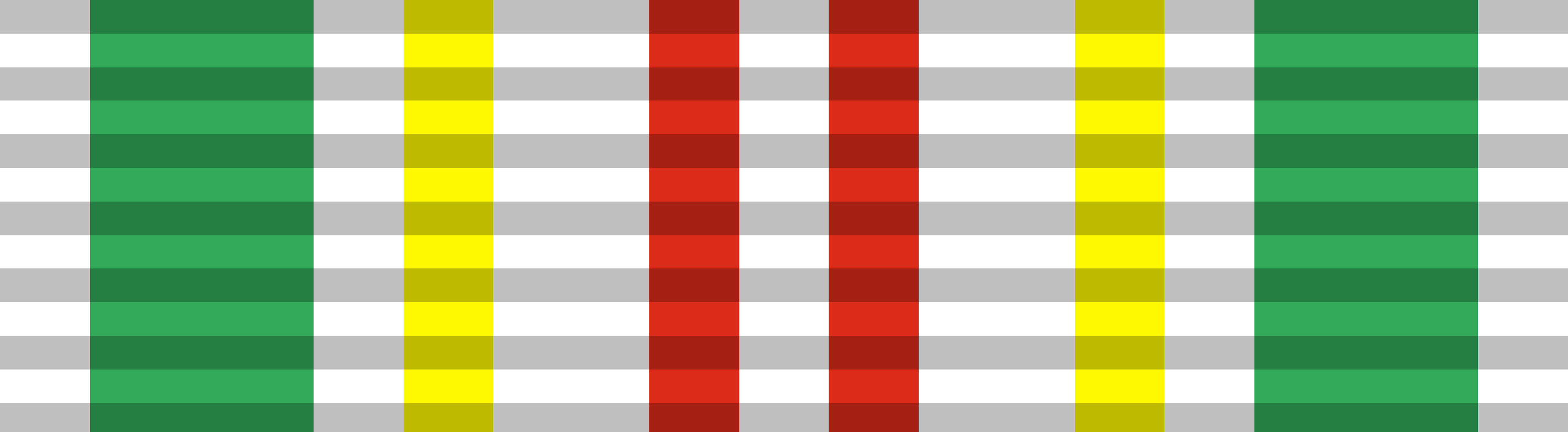
  - 1973 – Grand Meritorious Military Order Star, 1st Class
- Philippines :
  - 1975 – Philippine Legion of Honor (Rank of Commander)
