= Chao Phraya Bodindechanuchit (Yaem na Nakhon) =

General Chao Phraya Bodindechanuchit RV PChW MPCh MVM
- เจ้าพระยาบดินทรเดชานุชิต
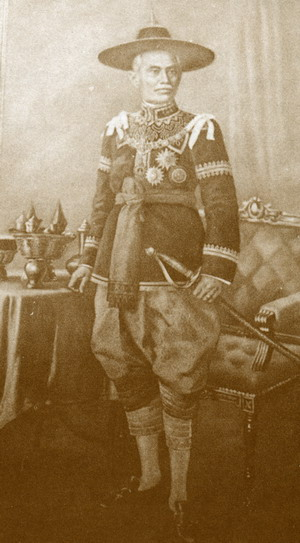
- Chao Phraya Bodindechanuchit (Yam Na Nakorn) in full dress as an ancient Chao Phraya

Minister of Defense
- In office August 26, 1921 – August 4, 1926
- Monarchs: Vajiravudh, Prajadhipok
- Preceded by: Arun Chatrakul
- Succeeded by: Paribatra Sukhumbandhu

Personal details
- Born: Yaem; April 21, 1867 Nakhon Si Thammarat, Nakhon Si Thammarat province, Siam
- Died: March 1, 1961 (aged 93) Bangkok, Thailand
- Education: Chulachomklao Royal Military Academy

Military service
- Allegiance: Siam
- Branch: Royal Thai Army
- Years of service: 1880–1926
- Rank: General

Chao Phraya Bodindechanuchit (Thai: เจ้าพระยาบดินทรเดชานุชิต), personal name Yaem na Nakhon (Thai: แย้ม ณ นคร, also spelled na Nagara), was the Siamese Minister of Defense from 26 August 1921 to 4 August 1926.

== Biography ==
=== Early years ===
Yaem was born on April 21, 1867, as the son of Chao Phraya Suthammamontri (Nu Phrom), the governor of Nakhon Si Thammarat. Yaem spent his childhood studying Thai and Khmer and Thai numbers under a few tutors. When he was 13, he ordained as a novice monk at Wat Phra Mahathat, Nakhon Si Thammarat province but later moved to Wat Mai Ka Kaew.

=== Military service ===
Yaem entered government service in 1880 after Somdet Chao Phraya Borom Maha Sri Suriwongse recruited him while visiting Nakhon Si Thammarat and brought him to Bangkok. Yaem then served under Chao PhrayaSurawong Waiyawat before becoming a cadet at the Royal Military Academy (now the Chulachomklao Royal Military Academy). He was the third student there, and studied at the Saranrom Palace until graduating, and was promoted to 2nd Lieutenant on December 1, 1889. On November 15, 1892, he was promoted to captain and on May 17, 1900, to Major. On December 5, 1897, he received the noble title of Luang Ruapratsapatphon, with a sakdina of 800. He was promoted to lieutenant colonel on May 14, 1902 and on September 20, 1901, he had the title of Phra Suradet Nachit and a sakdina of 1,000.

Yaem was described to serve with honesty and his ability to succeed within the government ranks, eventually making him adjutant of the Army on August 6, 1903 along with a prior promotion on July 16, 1903, to a colonel. He also gained the title of Phraya Woradetsakdawut on November 12, 1903. In 1902, Yaem oversaw the establishment of the military in Monthon Phayap in the north to suppress the Ngiao rebellion there. Later, in 1912, he was named to the tribunal for the court martial of the instigators of the Palace Revolt of 1912. He was named a privy councillor of King Vajiravudh, and would also continue in the role under King Prajadhipok. He was promoted to Lieutenant General on April 11, 1912. He was made Permanent Secretary of the Ministry of Defense in 1910. When Vajiravudh introduced the use of surnames in 1912, he granted Yaem's family the surname of "na Nagara" as descendants of the Governor of Nakhon Si Thammarat on June 24, 1913.

He was then finally promoted to a full general on April 1, 1919. Later on, he became acting Minister of Defense on August 26, 1921, and was appointed minister April 1, 1922. On November 11, 1922, he was given the title of Chaophraya Bodindechanuchit with a sakdina of 10,000. He was a member of Vajiravudh's paramilitary movement the Wild Tiger Corps, and received the rank of major on February 15, 1923.

=== Later years ===
Bodindechanuchit resigned from Minister of Defense on August 4, 1926, from illness and retired in Bangkok. During his later years, he would donate extensively to the maintenance for Buddhist temples in Bangkok as well as his hometown of Nakhon Si Thammarat. By this point, Bodindechanuchit had married Liap (เลียบ), daughter of Luang Sunthonsinthop (Cho Patchim) (หลวงสุนทรสินธพ (จอ ปัจฉิม)) and had 4 children with her. On March 1, 1961, Bodindechanuchit died and King Bhumibol Adulyadej himself attended his cremation at Wat Thepsirin on February 27, 1962.

== Awards ==
Thai Honours

- 1922 - Knight Grand Cross (First Class) of The Most Illustrious Order of Chula Chom Klao
- 1917 - Knight of the Ratana Varabhorn Order of Merit
- 1913 - Knight Grand Cross of the Most Exalted Order of the White Elephant
- 1912 - Knight Grand Cross of the Most Noble Order of the Crown of Thailand
- 1918 - Knight Commander of the Honourable Order of Rama
- 1921 - King Vajiravudh's Royal Cypher Medal, 2nd Class
- 1926 - King Prajadhipok's Royal Cypher Medal, 3rd Class
- 1954 - King Bhumibol Adulyadej's Royal Cypher Medal, 2nd Class
- 1903 - Chakra Mala Medal
- 1893 - Commemorative Medal on the Occasion of the Silver Jubilee Celebrations of King Chulalongkorn's Reign
- 1897 - Commemorative Medal of the Royal State Visits to Europe of King Chulalongkorn
- 1903 - Commemorative Medal on the Occasion of the Accession to the Throne of King Chulalongkorn as Two Times of King King Phra Phutthaloetla Naphalai's Reign
- 1908 - Commemorative Medal on the Occasion of the Longest Reign Celebrations of the Accession to the Throne of King Chulalongkorn
- 1911 - King Rama VI Coronation Medal
- 1925 - King Rama VII Coronation Medal
- 1950 - King Rama IX Coronation Medal
- 1932 - Commemorative Medal on the Occasion of the 150th Years of Rattanakosin Celebration
- 1957 - 25th Buddhist Century Celebration Medal

Foreign Honours

- France:
  - 1921 - Grand Officer of the Legion of Honour, 2nd Class
- Brunswick:
  - 1909 - Order of Henry the Lion, (Commander Cross, 1st Class)

Chao Phraya Bodindechanuchit (Yaem na Nakhon) House of Nagara Cadet branch of the House of Thonburi Born: 21 April 1867 Died: 1 March 1961
Political offices
| Preceded by Bodindechanuchit | Minister of Defence; 1921 – 1926 | Succeeded by Paribatra Sukhumbandhu |
Military offices
| Preceded by Bodindechanuchit | Minister of War; 1921 – 1926 | Succeeded by Paribatra Sukhumbandhu |
