= Pakornwut Udompipatskul =

Thai politician

- ปกรณ์วุฒิ อุดมพิพัฒน์สกุล

Opposition Chief Whip in the House of Representatives
- In office 26 December 2023 – 12 December 2026
- Leader: Natthaphong Ruengpanyawut

Personal details
- Party: People's

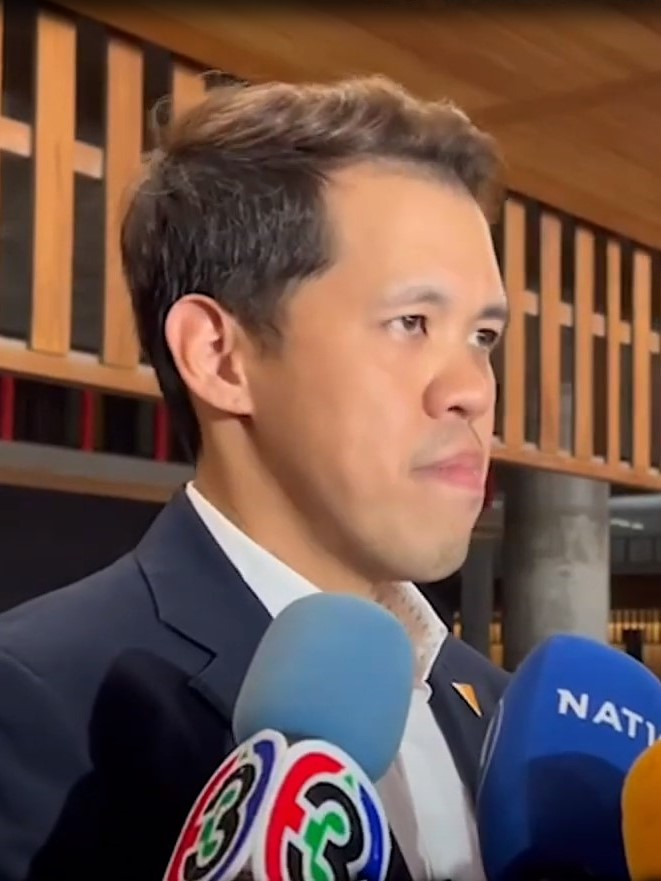

Pakornwut Udompipatskul (Thai: ปกรณ์วุฒิ อุดมพิพัฒน์สกุล) is a Thai politician serving as Opposition Chief Whip in the Thai House of Representatives.

== Career ==
=== MP vaping investigation ===
Following allegations that a People's Party MP was vaping inside the Parliament Building, Pakornwut noted the issue would be investigated by the House committee on ethics.
