= Sangad Chaloryu =

Thai admiral and politician (1916–1980)

Admiral Sangad Chaloryu
- สงัด ชลออยู่
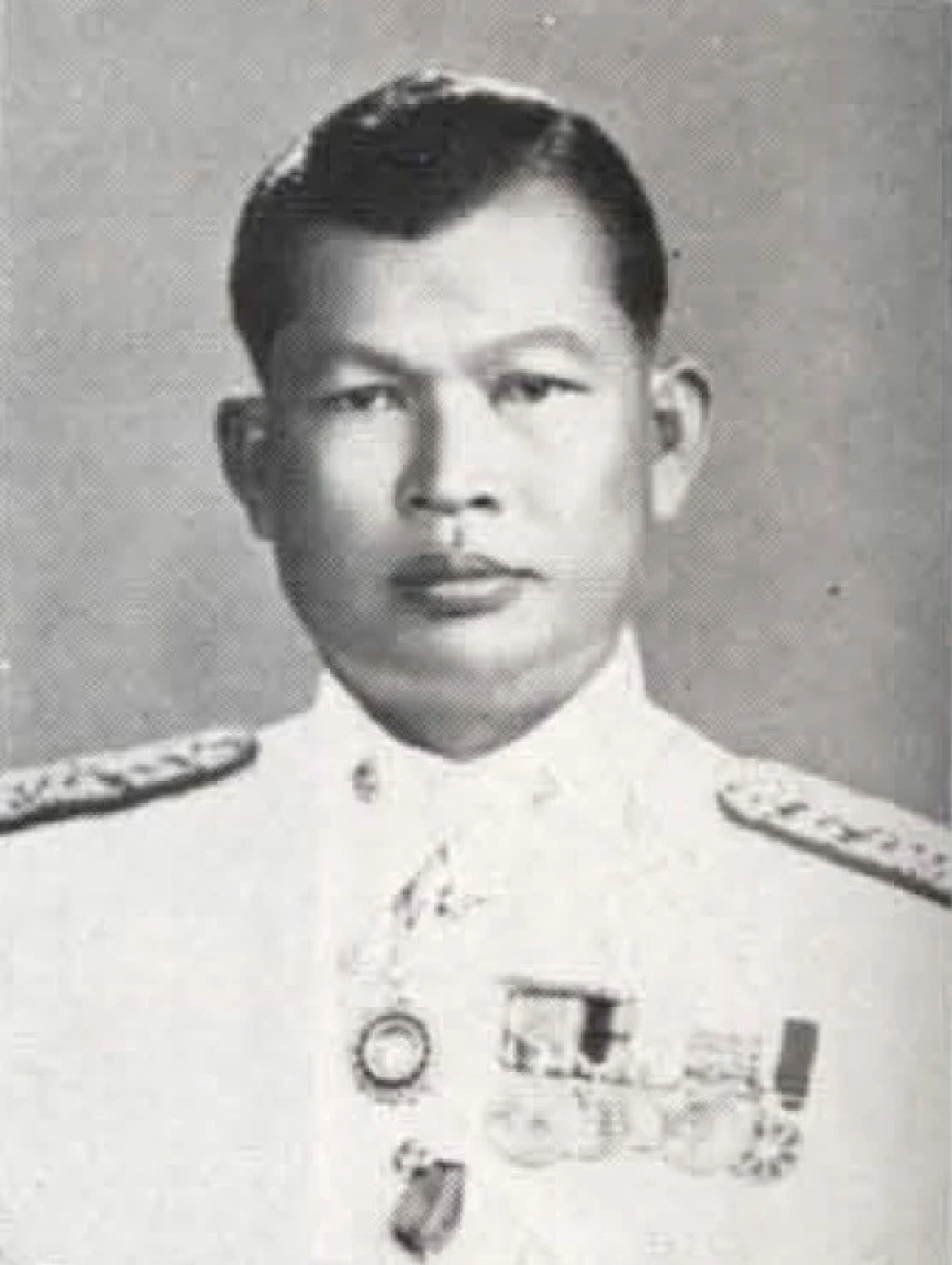

Acting Prime Minister of Thailand
- De facto (Note: as Head of the Revolutionary Council); 20 October 1977 – 10 November 1977
- Monarch: Bhumibol Adulyadej
- Preceded by: Thanin Kraivichien (as Prime Minister)
- Succeeded by: Kriangsak Chamanan (as Prime Minister)
- De facto (Note: as Head of the National Administrative Reform Council); 6 October 1976 – 8 October 1976
- Monarch: Bhumibol Adulyadej
- Preceded by: Seni Pramoj (as Prime Minister)
- Succeeded by: Thanin Kraivichien (as Prime Minister)

Minister of Defense
- In office 5 October 1976 – 6 October 1976
- Prime Minister: Seni Pramoj
- Preceded by: Seni Pramoj
- Succeeded by: Lek Neawmalee

Supreme Commander of the Armed Forces
- In office 1 October 1975 – 30 September 1976
- Preceded by: Kris Sivara
- Succeeded by: Kamon Dechatungkha

Commander in Chief of the Royal Thai Navy
- In office 19 November 1973 – 30 September 1976
- Preceded by: Cherdchai Thomyath
- Succeeded by: Amorn Sirigaya

Personal details
- Born: 4 March 1916 Suphan Buri, Siam
- Died: 23 November 1980 (aged 64) Rayong, Thailand
- Spouse: Sukon Chaloryu
- Education: Royal Thai Naval Academy
- Occupation: Naval officer; politician

Military service
- Allegiance: Kingdom of Thailand
- Branch/service: Royal Thai Navy
- Years of service: 1933–1977
- Rank: General; Admiral; Air Chief Marshal
- Commands: Royal Thai Armed Forces; Royal Thai Navy

Admiral Sangad Chaloryu (also written as Sa‐ngad Chaloryu; Thai: สงัด ชลออยู่; RTGS: Sa-ngat Chaloyu; 4 March 1916 – 23 November 1980) was a Thai admiral and politician who served as head of the National Administrative Reform Council (NARC), a military junta that ruled Thailand from 1976 to 1980.

== Education ==
Sangad studied at the Vichaibamrungraj School in Chai Nat Province and then moved to Uthai Witthayakhom School in Uthai Thani Province. He later moved to Bangkok to study in Bansomdejchaopraya School in the navy district Thon Buri District. After graduating from high school, he studied at the Royal Thai Naval Academy, and continued his studies at the National Defence College of Thailand and Naval War College.

== Careers ==
Sangad was considered to be a right-wing hawk and close to the CIA. In the 1930s as a young Naval Midshipman, he had trained in Nazi Germany in radar operations. As commander of a naval flotilla in 1954, he helped French Marines and elite forces escape from Vietnam after Hanoi was overrun by the Vietminh. He also held the important positions of Submarine Squadron Commander, Assistant Chief of Staff (operation), Commander of the Royal Thai Fleet, Deputy Commander-in-Chief of the Royal Thai Navy, and Commander in Chief of the Royal Thai Navy then Supreme Commander of the Armed Forces.

== Coup leader ==
As defense minister, Sangad led the coup of October 6, 1976. This coup ousted the elected civilian government of Seni Pramoj. Sangad became chairman of NARC, which appointed royal favorite Thanin Kraivichien as Prime Minister. The Thanin government instituted sweeping purges of leftists and communists. Sangad was a figurehead and Army Secretary Kriangsak Chomanan was NARC's most influential figure. In October 1977, NARC staged a second coup (this time without the king's consent), and replaced Thanin with Kriangsak.

== Non-military activities ==
- Member of the House of Representatives
- Member of the Constituent Assembly
- Senator
- Minister of Defense
- Leader of 1976 coup
- Leader of March 1977 coup attempt
- President of the National Policy Council
- Member of the 1973 National Legislative Assembly

== Death ==
Sangad died from a heart attack on 23 November 1980 at Klaeng District Hospital, Rayong Province, at age 65 years.

== Honours ==
received the following royal decorations in the Honours System of Thailand:

- Knight Grand Cordon of The Most Exalted Order of the White Elephant
- Knight Grand Cordon of The Most Noble Order of the Crown of Thailand
- Knight Grand Commander of The Most Illustrious Order of Chula Chom Klao
- Victory Medal - Franco-Thai War
- Victory Medal - World War II
- Victory Medal - Korean War
- Freeman Safeguarding Medal, 1st Class
- Border Service Medal
- Chakra Mala Medal
- King Rama IX Royal Cypher Medal, 3rd Class
- 25th Buddhist Century Celebration Medal

=== Foreign honours ===
- UN :
  - United Nations Service Medal Korea
- Taiwan :
  - Order of the Cloud and Banner, 9th Class
  - Order of Precious Tripod with Grand Cordon
- South Korea :
  - Order of National Security Merit, Tong-il Medal
- Indonesia :
  - Navy Meritorious Service Star, Utama Class
- USA :
  - Commander of the Legion of Merit

== Notes ==
Political offices
Preceded by Choetchai Thomya	Navy chief Nov. 19, 1973 – Sept. 30, 1975	Succeeded by Amorn Sirikaya
Preceded by Krit Srivara	Supreme Commander of the Armed Forces; Oct. 1, 1975 – Oct. 1, 1976	Succeeded by Kamon Dachatungkha
Preceded by Seni Pramoj	Minister of Defense; Oct. 5, 1976 – Oct. 20, 1977	Succeeded by Lek Naeomali
