= Thanin Kraivichien =

Prime Minister of Thailand from 1976 to 1977

Thanin Kraivichien PCh MPCh MVM
- ธานินทร์ กรัยวิเชียร
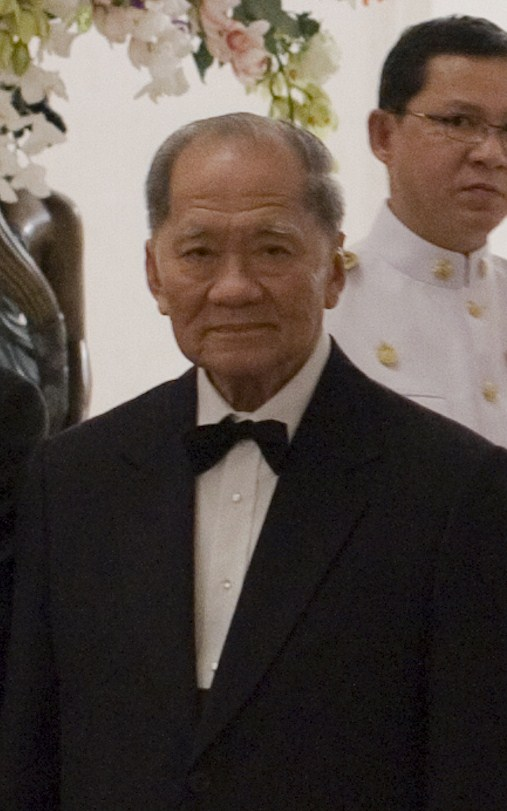
- Thanin in 2011

Acting President of the Privy Council
- In office 13 October 2016 – 1 December 2016
- Monarchs: Vajiralongkorn (King); Prem Tinsulanonda (Regent)
- Preceded by: Prem Tinsulanonda
- Succeeded by: Prem Tinsulanonda

14th Prime Minister of Thailand
- In office 8 October 1976 – 20 October 1977
- Monarch: Bhumibol Adulyadej
- Preceded by: Seni Pramoj; Sangad Chaloryu (de facto)
- Succeeded by: Sangad Chaloryu (de facto); Kriangsak Chamanan

Personal details
- Born: 5 April 1927 Bangkok, Siam
- Died: 23 February 2025 (aged 97)
- Spouse: Karen Andersen (1928–1995)
- Children: 5
- Education: Thammasat University; London School of Economics and Political Science
- Profession: Lawyer; politician

Thanin Kraivichien (first name also spelled Tanin, last name Kraivixien or Kraivichian; Thai: ธานินทร์ กรัยวิเชียร, RTGS: Thanin Kraiwichian, IPA: [tʰaː.nin krai.wí.t͡ɕʰian]; 5 April 1927 – 23 February 2025) was a Thai judge, politician and law professor. He was the prime minister of Thailand between 1976 and 1977. He was then appointed to the Privy Council and became its president in 2016. With the death of Prem Tinsulanonda in May 2019, he became the oldest living former Thai Prime Minister.

== Early life and education ==
Thanin was a son of Hae and Pa-ob Kraivichien. He was born in Bangkok. His father was a Chinese-born merchant and owner of one of the biggest pawnshops in Bangkok. Thanin studied law at Thammasat University, graduating in 1948. He then went to the London School of Economics to continue with his law studies. He graduated in 1953, and in 1958 was called to the Bar at Gray's Inn. In Great Britain, Thanin met Karen Andersen, a native of Denmark, whom he married. They had five children.

== Judicial career ==
After Thanin returned to Thailand in 1954, Thanin worked in the Ministry of Justice, becoming an associate judge. He rose quickly, finally becoming President of the Supreme Court of Thailand. Additionally, he taught law at Thammasat and Chulalongkorn universities and the Thai Bar Association. He was appointed adjunct professor to the Faculty of Commerce and Accountancy at Chulalongkorn University in 1972. As an avocation, he published books that warned of the dangers of communism.

After the democratic uprising against military dictatorship in 1973, Thanin was a member of the transitional legislative assembly appointed by the king. He became a member of the far-right anti-communist Nawaphon movement. He had a TV show in which he attacked communism, the students' movement, and progressive politicians.

== Prime Minister of Thailand (1976–1977) ==
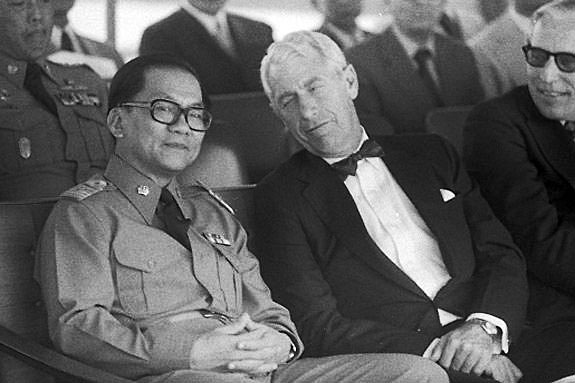
Prime Minister Thanin with US ambassador Charles S. Whitehouse in 1976

After the Thammasat University massacre of 6 October 1976, the democratically elected government of Seni Pramoj was toppled by a military coup led by Admiral Sangad Chaloryu. Under the military junta, named the National Administrative Reform Council (NARC), “martial law was declared, the Constitution abolished, and political parties disbanded.”

Two days after the coup, the NARC announced the appointment of Thanin as prime minister. His appointment had been decided beforehand in February 1976, when Sangad consulted King Bhumibol Adulyadej on his choice for prime minister in the event of a military coup. Furthermore, many of the junta’s early proclamations were likely written by Thanin, as they contained characteristic, inflammatory right-wing phrases such as “communist imperialism.”

Thanin’s appointment to the premiership was met with public surprise, as he was a relatively unknown figure in Thailand. In one of his first addresses to the nation, the new prime minister justified the coup d’etat, declaring:

According to our military analysis, it was clear that the country was in deep confusion, the causes of which came from all directions. As far as the students were concerned, we knew that the majority of them were good people. Only the minority of students were tools of the ideology unsuitable for Thailand… Secondly, it was due to the labor movement, which became violent and without reason… and the government was composed of so many factions. It was so difficult to agree on any important national issue… We could not see how those confusions [could] be resolved. We had to step in to correct the situation.

=== Cabinet formation ===
Thanin insisted on selecting his cabinet himself and rejected most of the military junta's nominations, with only the positions of deputy prime minister and deputy minister of defence being occupied by members of the military. Thanin led the first Thai cabinet in which several women, including Wimolsiri Chamnarnvej and Lursakdi Sampatisiri, held ministerial posts.

As Thanin mostly selected “his close friends and confidants or others who had worked with him before” as ministers, his resulting cabinet was widely regarded as severely underqualified, with opponents describing its members as “inexperienced amateurs.” For instance, Samak Sundaravej (later to himself become the Prime Minister of Thailand), a right-wing extremist who opposed the free press and whose radio station was partially responsible for the 6 October 1976 massacre, was appointed as Minister of the Interior. Likewise, Dusit Siriwan, who had been Thanin’s television co-host and was reportedly “obsessed with the evils of communism,” was appointed as Minister to the Office of the Prime Minister.

=== Domestic policy ===
The primary goal of the Thanin government, according to Thanin himself, was to lead the Thai people—otherwise “not yet ready for full liberal democracy”—through a twelve-year program of guided democracy split into three four-year segments, after which the House of Representatives would return to being a fully elected unicameral legislature. To do so, the National Administrative Reform Assembly (NARA) was established as an advisory, quasi-parliamentary body with members appointed by the junta. A new constitution, one of the shortest in Thailand’s history, was hastily promulgated, with its defining feature being Section 21, which gave the prime minister “the power to order or do anything” in the name of national security, making Thanin a de facto dictator.

Thanin was seen as honest and intelligent, but also eminently ideological and politically extreme. To suppress dissent, he sent police special forces to notoriously liberal book shops, and ordered the confiscation and burning of 45,000 books, including those written by Thomas More, George Orwell, and Maxim Gorky. Strict censorship was imposed upon the press, and Thanin’s administration closed multiple newspapers for publishing articles critical of the government, with Minister of the Interior Samak Sundaravej ordering the expulsion of foreign correspondent Norman Peagam and the closure of Kukrit Pramoj’s supposedly “untouchable” Siamrath Daily.

The labour movement was also suppressed. The government banned strikes and all organized trade unions, breaking a planned February strike at a jute mill by arresting ten workers. Though 3,000 “suspected subversives” were likewise detained following the military coup, by 1977, there were only around 100 students who remained in custody, mostly under charges of “communist activism.” Foremost among these were the Thammasat 18, a group of students and trade union leaders charged with inciting violence in October 1976.

Thanin's crackdown on trade unions, progressive students' organizations, and farmers' associations drove activists into the underground structures of the Communist Party of Thailand. Instead of weakening the communists, it fuelled their armed struggle against the government.

=== Downfall ===
In March 1977, a group of younger army officers known as the "Young Turks", who had an interest in political matters, tried to topple Thanin. Their attempted coup failed. On 20 October 1977, however, Admiral Sangad again seized power and pressed Thanin to resign. The military justified their intervention because Thanin's government had divided the country and had virtually no public support, the economic situation had worsened, and people in general disagreed with such a long-term suspension of democracy.

== Privy Councillor ==
King Bhumibol Adulyadej immediately appointed Thanin to his Privy Council. During the vacancy of the throne after Bhumibol's death on 13 October 2016, the former President of the Privy Council, Prem Tinsulanonda, served as regent and interim head of state. Thanin temporarily assumed the office of President of the Privy Council during this period. After King Vajiralongkorn's accession to the throne on 1 December 2016, Prem returned to his earlier position, while Thanin was not reappointed to the Privy Council at all.

== Death ==
Thanin Kraivichien died on 23 February 2025, at the age of 97.

Political offices
Preceded by Seni Pramoj	Prime Minister of Thailand; 1976–1977	Succeeded by Kriangsak Chamanan
Preceded by Prem Tinsulanonda	Acting President of the Privy Council; 2016	Succeeded by Prem Tinsulanonda
