= Results of the 2023 Thai general election =

The 2023 Thai general election was held in Thailand on 14 May 2023 to elect 500 members of the House of Representatives. 400 members were elected from each electoral district by first-past-the-post voting, and 100 members were elected from a party list. 251 seats were required for control of the House of Representatives and 376 seats for control of the prime ministerial election (the House and Senate elect the Prime Minister together).

== Parties ==
PPRP	Palang Pracharath Party
FFP	Future Forward Party
MFP	Move Forward Party
CPN	Chart Pattana Party
CPK	Chart Pattana Kla Party
PT	Pheu Thai Party
BJT	Bhumjaithai Party
Dem	Democrat Party
CT	Chartthaipattana Party
TLP	Thai Local Power Party
PCP	For The Nation Party
ACT	Action Coalition for Thailand
UTN	United Thai Nation Party
TST	Thai Sang Thai Party

== Party list result ==
100 members of the House of Representatives from 17 parties were elected from party lists, determined by Hare-Niemeyer method.

Party	Votes	%	Seats
Move Forward Party	14,438,851	38.01	39
Pheu Thai Party	10,962,522	28.86	29
United Thai Nation Party	4,766,408	12.55	13
Bhumjaithai Party	1,138,202	3.00	3
Democrat Party	925,349	2.44	3
Prachachat Party	602,645	1.59	2
Palang Pracharath Party	537,625	1.42	1
Thai Liberal Party	351,376	0.92	1
Thai Sang Thai Party	340,178	0.90	1
New Democracy Party	273,428	0.72	1
New Party	249,731	0.66	1
Chart Pattana Kla Party	212,676	0.56	1
Party of Thai Counties	201,411	0.53	1
Chart Thai Pattana Party	192,497	0.51	1
Fair Party	184,817	0.49	1
New Social Power Party	177,379	0.47	1
Thai Teachers for People Party	175,182	0.46	1
Other	2,257,272	5.94	0
Total	37,987,549	100.00	100
Source: Election Commission

=== Incumbent status ===
Last incumbent	Party when elected	Party in this election	Status
Suriya Juangroongruangkit	PPRP	PT	✓ Incumbent re-elected.
Somsak Thepsuthin	PPRP	PT	✓ Incumbent re-elected.
Pongkawin Jungrungruangkit	PPRP	PT	Incumbent lost reelection.
Wirach Ratanasate	PPRP	PPRP	Incumbent lost reelection.
Santi Promphat	PPRP	PPRP	Incumbent lost reelection.
Bunsing Warinrak	PPRP	PPRP	Incumbent lost reelection.
Surasit Vongvittayanun	PPRP	PPRP	Incumbent lost reelection.
Surasit Nitivutvorrarak	PPRP	PPRP	Incumbent lost reelection.
Artthakorn Sirilatthayakorn	PPRP	PPRP	✓ Incumbent re-elected in Chachoengsao 2.
Pornchai Tarkulwaranont	PPRP	PPRP	Incumbent lost reelection.
Yuthana Pothasuthon	PPRP	PPRP	Incumbent lost reelection in Suphan Buri 4.
Torsak Asvahem	PPRP	PPRP	Incumbent lost reelection in Samut Prakan 7.
Chuan Choojun	PPRP	PPRP	Incumbent lost reelection.
Suraporn Danaitangtrakool	PPRP	PPRP	Incumbent lost reelection.
Walaiporn Ratanasate	PPRP	PPRP	Incumbent lost reelection.
Komin Teekananon	PPRP	PPRP	Incumbent lost reelection.
Kittiprapa Jiwasantikarn	PPRP	PPRP	Incumbent retired.
Tatirat Ratanasate	PPRP	PPRP	Incumbent lost reelection in Nakhon Ratchasima 16.
Paiboon Nititawan	PRP	PPRP	Incumbent lost reelection.
Yongyuth Thepjumnong		PPRP	Incumbent lost reelection.
Wanvipa Maison	FFP	MFP	✓ Incumbent re-elected.
Pita Limjaroenrat	FFP	MFP	✓ Incumbent re-elected.
Surachet Pravinvongvuth	FFP	MFP	✓ Incumbent re-elected.
Phicharn Chaowapatanawong	FFP	MFP	Incumbent retired.
Apichat Sirisoontorn	FFP	MFP	✓ Incumbent re-elected.
Sirikanya Tansakun	FFP	MFP	✓ Incumbent re-elected.
Rangsiman Rome	FFP	MFP	✓ Incumbent re-elected.
Suthep Ou-Oun	FFP	MFP	Incumbent lost reelection.
Parinya Chuaigate Keereerut	FFP	MFP	Incumbent lost reelection.
Nattaphon Suepsakwong	FFP	MFP	Incumbent retired.
Tunyawat Kamolwongwat	FFP	MFP	✓ Incumbent re-elected.
Somchai Fungcholjit	FFP	MFP	Incumbent retired.
Wayo Assawarungruang	FFP	MFP	✓ Incumbent re-elected.
Khamphong Thephakham	FFP	MFP	✓ Incumbent re-elected.
Amarat Chokepamitkul	FFP	MFP	Incumbent retired.
Woraphop Viriyaroj	FFP	MFP	✓ Incumbent re-elected.
Kanphong Chongsuttanamanee	FFP	MFP	Incumbent lost reelection.
Supisarn Bhakdinarinath	FFP	MFP	Incumbent retired.
Nitipon Piwmow	FFP	MFP	✓ Incumbent re-elected.
Pakornwut Udompipatskul	FFP	MFP	✓ Incumbent re-elected.
Bencha Saengchan	FFP	MFP	✓ Incumbent re-elected.
Chavalit Laohaudomphan	FFP	MFP	Incumbent lost reelection.
Nutthawut Buaprathum	FFP	MFP	✓ Incumbent re-elected.
Taweesak Taksin	FFP	MFP	Incumbent retired.
Prasertpong Soornnuvatara	FFP	MFP	✓ Incumbent re-elected.
Nateepat Kulsetthasith	FFP	MFP	✓ Incumbent re-elected.
Teerajchai Phuntumas	FFP	MFP	✓ Incumbent re-elected in Bangkok 18.
Surawat Thongbu	FFP	MFP	✓ Incumbent re-elected.
Ongkan Chaiyabut	FFP	MFP	✓ Incumbent re-elected.
Kasemsan Meethip	FFP	BJT	Incumbent lost reelection.
Somkiat Chaivisuttigul	FFP	MFP	Incumbent retired.
Manop Keereepuwadol	FFP	MFP	✓ Incumbent re-elected.
Chuan Leekpai	Dem	Dem	✓ Incumbent re-elected.
Banyat Bantadtan	Dem	Dem	✓ Incumbent re-elected.
Tirdpong Jayanandana	Dem	Dem	Incumbent retired.
Jurin Laksanawisit	Dem	Dem	✓ Incumbent re-elected.
Ongart Klampaiboon	Dem	Dem	Incumbent lost reelection.
Asawin Wipoosiri	Dem	Dem	Incumbent retired.
Kiat Sittheeamorn	Dem	Dem	Incumbent lost reelection.
Panich Vikitsreth	Dem	Dem	Incumbent retired.
Chitpas Tant Kridakon	Dem	Dem	Incumbent lost reelection.
Sutasn Ngenmune	Dem	Dem	Incumbent lost reelection.
Pisit Leeahtam	Dem	Dem	Incumbent lost reelection.
Pimrapee Phanwichatikul	Dem	Dem	Incumbent lost reelection in Krabi 3.
Jakphan Piyapornpaiboon	Dem	Dem	✓ Incumbent re-elected in Prachuap Khiri Khan 2.
Malika Boonmeetrakul Mahasuk	Dem	Dem	Incumbent lost reelection.
Sutham Rahong	Dem	Dem	Incumbent retired.
Chamni Sakdiset	Dem	Dem	Incumbent lost reelection.
Surabot Leekpai	Dem	Dem	Incumbent lost reelection.
Yup Nana	Dem	Dem	Incumbent retired.
Rames Rattanachaweng	Dem	Dem	Incumbent lost reelection in Phang Nga 2.
Anutin Charnvirakul	BJT	BJT	✓ Incumbent re-elected.
Saksayam Chidchob	BJT	BJT	✓ Incumbent re-elected.
Sora-at Klinpratoom	BJT	BJT	Incumbent lost reelection.
Supamas Isarabhakdi	BJT	BJT	Incumbent lost reelection.
Korrawee Prissananantakul	BJT	BJT	✓ Incumbent re-elected in Ang Thong 2.
Siriwat Kajornprasart	BJT	BJT	✓ Incumbent re-elected in Phichit 3.
Pechdau Tohmeena	BJT	BJT	Incumbent lost reelection in Pattani 1.
Suphachai Jaisamut	BJT	BJT	Incumbent lost reelection.
Settapong Malisuwan	BJT	BJT	Incumbent retired.
Marut Masayavanich	BJT	BJT	Incumbent lost reelection.
Sawab Phaoprathan	BJT	BJT	Incumbent lost reelection.
Suchat Chokchaiwattanakorn	BJT	BJT	Incumbent lost reelection.
Wirach Pantumapol	FFP	BJT	Incumbent lost reelection.
Ekkarat Changlao	PPRP	BJT	✓ Incumbent re-elected in Khon Kaen 4.
Sereepisuth Temeeyaves	TLP	TLP	✓ Incumbent re-elected.
Watchara Na Wangkanai	TLP	TLP	Incumbent retired.
Virat Varotsirin	TLP	TLP	Incumbent lost reelection.
Napaporn Petchinda	TLP	TLP	Incumbent lost reelection.
Pech Eakkamlangkul	TLP	TLP	Incumbent lost reelection.
Tanaporn Somthongdang	TLP	TLP	Incumbent retired.
Amphai Kongmanee	TLP	TLP	Incumbent retired.
Wissanu Muangprasee	TLP	TLP	Incumbent lost reelection.
Suppachai Naksuwan	TLP	TLP	Incumbent lost reelection.
Varawut Silpa-archa	CT	CT	✓ Incumbent re-elected
Theera Wongsamut	CT	CT	Incumbent lost reelection.
Nikorn Chamnong	CT	CT	Incumbent lost reelection.
Noppadol Martsri	CT	CT	✓ Incumbent re-elected in Suphan Buri 3.
Jullapun Nonsrichai	FFP	CT	Incumbent retired.
Supadich Akasariksha	NEP	UTN	Incumbent lost reelection in Bangkok 11.
Manoon Sivapiromrat	NEP	NEP	Incumbent retired.
Marasri Khachonruangroj	NEP	NEP	Incumbent retired.
Jiraporn Nakdilok	NEP	NEP	Incumbent retired.
Pichai Khachonruangroj	NEP	NEP	Incumbent retired.
Athitaya Anafarang	NEP	NEP	Incumbent retired.
Tawee Sodsong	PCC	PCC	✓ Incumbent re-elected.
Pechawat Wattanapongsirikul	PCP	PCP	Incumbent retired.
Linda Cherdchai	PCP	PCP	Incumbent retired.
Busarin Worapattananon	PCP	PCP	Incumbent lost reelection.
Kerkmontri Rujasotatirapat	PCP	PCP	Incumbent retired.
Wareerat Kaewngern	PCP	PCP	Incumbent retired.
Rewat Wisarutwet	TLP	PCP	Incumbent lost reelection.
Chutathut Laothamatas	ACT	ACT	Incumbent retired.
Suneta Saekoh	ACT	ACT	Incumbent lost reelection.
Anek Laothamatas	ACT	ACT	Incumbent retired.
Jomdech Trimek	ACT	ACT	Incumbent retired.
Tewan Liptapallop	CPN	CPK	Incumbent lost reelection in Nakhon Ratchasima 1.
Don Hetrakul	CPN	TST	Incumbent retired.
Yodying Sanyakul	TLP	TLP	Incumbent retired.
Sittipong Wonglerdsak	TLP	TLP	Incumbent retired.
Sirirat Suksanan	TLP	TLP	Incumbent retired.
Damrong Phidet	TFC	TFC	Incumbent retired.
Yanyong Thanompichithamrong	TFC	TFC	Incumbent retired.
Silumpa Lertnuwat		UTN	Incumbent lost reelection in Bangkok 24.
Wiwat Jaroenpanit			Incumbent lost reelection.
Khanatap Techadetrueangkun			Incumbent lost reelection.
Preeda Boonplerng			✓ Incumbent re-elected.
Surathin Phichan			✓ Incumbent re-elected.
Ravee Maschamadol			Incumbent lost reelection.
Pansak Sabu			Incumbent lost reelection.

=== Constituency incumbent running as party list candidate ===
Last incumbent	Party when elected	Party in this election	Status
Khajit Chainikom	PT	PT	Incumbent lost reelection.
La-ong Tiyapairach	PT	PT	Incumbent lost reelection.
Pairoat Lohsoonthorn	PT	PT	✓ Incumbent re-elected.
Prasert Jantararuangtong	PT	PT	✓ Incumbent re-elected.
Visarn Techateerawat	PT	PT	Incumbent lost reelection.
Visuth Chainaroon	PT	PT	✓ Incumbent re-elected.
Weerawat Osathanukroh	PT	PT	Incumbent lost reelection.
Wisit Techateerawat	PT	PT	Incumbent lost reelection.
Sompong Amornvivat	PT	PT	✓ Incumbent re-elected.
Sutin Khungsang	PT	PT	✓ Incumbent re-elected.
Anudith Nakornthap	PT	TST	Incumbent lost reelection.
Atirat Ratanasate	PPRP	PPRP	Incumbent lost reelection.
Nipan Siritorn	PPRP	PPRP	Incumbent lost reelection.
Panya Jeenakum	PPRP	PPRP	Incumbent lost reelection.
Suchart Tonjaroen	PPRP	PT	✓ Incumbent re-elected.
Pinyo Niroj	PPRP	BJT	Incumbent lost reelection.
Chaiwat Paopiamsap	PPRP	UTN	✓ Incumbent re-elected.
Suchart Chomklin	PPRP	UTN	✓ Incumbent re-elected.
Natthaphong Ruengpanyawut	FFP	MFP	✓ Incumbent re-elected.
Thongdaeng Benjapak	FFP	MFP	Incumbent lost reelection.

=== Newly elected candidates ===
Candidate	Party	Status
Chaitawat Tulaton	MFP	✓ Elected.
Sia Champatong	MFP	✓ Elected.
Apisit Laisuttuklai	MFP	✓ Elected.
Wirot Lakkanaadisorn	MFP	✓ Elected.
Sittipon Wibultanakun	MFP	✓ Elected.
Parit Watcharasin	MFP	✓ Elected.
Chaiwat Satawornwijit	MFP	✓ Elected.
Romadon Panjor	MFP	✓ Elected.
Karunpon Thiensuwan	MFP	✓ Elected.
Poonsak Chanchampa	MFP	✓ Elected.
Supachok Chaiyasaj	MFP	✓ Elected.
Saniwan Buaban	MFP	✓ Elected.
Paramee Waijongcharoen	MFP	✓ Elected.
Woraporn Wiriyaroj	MFP	✓ Elected.
Laofang Banthitterdsakun	MFP	✓ Elected.
Chutima Kotchapan	MFP	✓ Elected.
Chunlapong Yuket	MFP	✓ Elected.
Kanlayapat Rajitroj	MFP	✓ Elected.
Narongdej Ularakun	MFP	✓ Elected.
Pakamon Noonanan	MFP	✓ Elected.
Wiroj Pao-in	PT	✓ Elected.
Chusak Sirinin	PT	✓ Elected.
Chalerm Yubamrung	PT	✓ Elected.
Chaikasem Nitisiri	PT	✓ Elected.
Chaturon Chaisang	PT	✓ Elected.
Pairoj Lohsoontorn	PT	✓ Elected.
Songklam Kitlerdpairoj	PT	✓ Elected.
Prayut Siripanich	PT	✓ Elected.
Adisorn Piangket	PT	✓ Elected.
Nikom Boonwiset	PT	✓ Elected.
Khattiya Sawadipon	PT	✓ Elected.
Sudawan Wangsupakitkoson	PT	✓ Elected.
Praweenut Intapanya	PT	✓ Elected.
Surakiat Thientong	PT	✓ Elected.
Jittipoj Wiriyaroj	PT	✓ Elected.
Danuporn Poonnakan	PT	✓ Elected.
Anusorn Eiamsa-ard	PT	✓ Elected.
Pisarn Wattanawongkiri	PT	✓ Elected.
Sutham Sangprathum	PT	✓ Elected.
Lintiporn Warinwatchararoj	PT	✓ Elected.
Songsak Tongsri	BJT	✓ Elected.
Prawit Wongsuwon	PPRP	✓ Elected.

== Constituency results ==
There are 400 constituencies in this election, increased from 350 constituencies in last election. They were elected by first-past-the-post voting.

Region	District	Last incumbent	Party when elected	Party in this election	Status	Elected candidate	Party
BANGKOK METROPOLITAN	Bangkok 1	Karnkanit Haewsantati	PPRP	PT	Incumbent lost reelection.	Paramait Vithayaruksun	MFP
BANGKOK METROPOLITAN	Bangkok 2	Patcharin Sumsiripong	PPRP	BJT	Incumbent lost reelection.	Tisana Choonhavan	MFP
BANGKOK METROPOLITAN	Bangkok 3	Vanvaree Talomsin	FFP	MFP	Incumbent retired.	Chorayuth Chaturapornprasit	MFP
BANGKOK METROPOLITAN	Bangkok 4	Korranit Ngamsukonratana	PPRP	BJT	Incumbent lost reelection.	Bhuntin Noumjerm	MFP
BANGKOK METROPOLITAN	Bangkok 5 New district	Pradoemchai Bunchuailua	PT	BJT	Incumbent lost reelection.	Chalermchai Kulalert	MFP
BANGKOK METROPOLITAN	Bangkok 6 Redistricted from district 5	Pada Vorakanon	PPRP	BJT	Incumbent lost reelection.	Kantapon Duangamporn	MFP
BANGKOK METROPOLITAN	Bangkok 7	Thanikan Pornpongsaroj	PPRP	PPRP	Incumbent was suspended.	Patsarin Ramwong	MFP
BANGKOK METROPOLITAN	Bangkok 8 Redistricted from district 9	Surachart Thienthong	PT	PT	Incumbent lost reelection.	Chayaphon Satondee	MFP
BANGKOK METROPOLITAN	Bangkok 9 New district					Suphanat Minchainant	MFP
BANGKOK METROPOLITAN	Bangkok 10	Karoon Hosakul	PT	TST	Incumbent lost reelection.	Ekkarach Udomumnuay	MFP
BANGKOK METROPOLITAN	Bangkok 11	Anudith Nakornthap	PT	TST	Incumbent running as party-lists candidate.	Sasinan Thamnithinan	MFP
BANGKOK METROPOLITAN	Bangkok 12	Anusorn Panthong	PT	PT	Incumbent lost reelection in District 9.	Puriwat Chaisamran	MFP
BANGKOK METROPOLITAN	Bangkok 13 Redistricted from district 8	Kasidet Chutimant	PPRP	BJT	Incumbent lost reelection.	Tanadej Pengsuk	MFP
BANGKOK METROPOLITAN	Bangkok 14 Redistricted from district 13	Thitipas Choddaechachainun	PPRP	UTN	Incumbent lost reelection.	Sirilapat Kongtrakarn	MFP
BANGKOK METROPOLITAN	Bangkok 15 Redistricted from district 14	Phonpoom Vipattipumiprates	PT	PT	Incumbent lost reelection.	Vittawat Tichawanich	MFP
BANGKOK METROPOLITAN	Bangkok 16	Jirayu Huangsab	PT	PT	Incumbent lost reelection.	Pimkarn Kiratiwirapakorn	MFP
BANGKOK METROPOLITAN	Bangkok 17	Siripong Rassamee	PPRP	PPRP	Incumbent lost reelection.	Weerawut Rukthieng	MFP
BANGKOK METROPOLITAN	Bangkok 18 New district					Teerajchai Phunthumas	MFP
BANGKOK METROPOLITAN	Bangkok 19 Redistricted from district 15	Chanvit Wipoosiri	PPRP	PPRP	Incumbent retired.	Kanphong Prayoonsak	MFP
BANGKOK METROPOLITAN	Bangkok 20 Redistricted from district 18	Theerarat Samrejvanich	PT	PT	Incumbent re-elected.	Theerarat Samrejvanich	PT
BANGKOK METROPOLITAN	Bangkok 21 Redistricted from district 19	Prasit Mahamad	PPRP	UTN	Incumbent lost reelection.	Nuttapong Premphunsawad	MFP
BANGKOK METROPOLITAN	Bangkok 22 Redistricted from district 20	Monthol Phokai	FFP	BJT	Incumbent lost reelection.	Supakon Tangtiphaiboontana	MFP
BANGKOK METROPOLITAN	Bangkok 23 Redistricted from district 21	Somkiat Thanomsin	FFP	CT	Incumbent lost renomination as an MFP Candidate then lost reelection.	Piyarat Chongthep	MFP
BANGKOK METROPOLITAN	Bangkok 24 New district					Taopiphop Limjittrakorn	MFP
BANGKOK METROPOLITAN	Bangkok 25 Redistricted from district 24	Thodsaporn Thongsiri	FFP	UTN	Incumbent lost reelection.	Annsiri Walaikanok	MFP
BANGKOK METROPOLITAN	Bangkok 26 Redistricted from district 23	Chotpipat Techasoponmanee	FFP	BJT	Incumbent lost reelection.	Chaiyampawan Manpianchit	MFP
BANGKOK METROPOLITAN	Bangkok 27 Redistricted from district 25	Nattacha Boonchaiinsawat	FFP	MFP	Incumbent re-elected.	Nattacha Boonchaiinsawat	MFP
BANGKOK METROPOLITAN	Bangkok 28 Redistricted from district 26	Wan Ubumrung	PT	PT	Incumbent lost reelection.	Rukchanok Srinork	MFP
BANGKOK METROPOLITAN	Bangkok 29 Redistricted from district 28	Natthaphong Ruengpanyawut	FFP	MFP	Incumbent run as party-lists candidate.	Tisarat Laohapon	MFP
BANGKOK METROPOLITAN	Bangkok 30 Redistricted from district 29	Supaporn Kongwutipanya	PT	PT	Incumbent lost reelection.	Thanyathorn Dhaninwattanathorn	MFP
BANGKOK METROPOLITAN	Bangkok 31 Redistricted from district 27	Jirawat Arunyakanon	FFP	PT	Incumbent lost reelection.	Sirin Sanguansin	MFP
BANGKOK METROPOLITAN	Bangkok 32 Redistricted from district 22	Taopiphop Limjittrakorn	FFP	MFP	Incumbent re-elected in District 24.	Pavitra Jittakit	MFP
BANGKOK METROPOLITAN	Bangkok 33 Redistricted from district 30	Chakkrapan Pornnimit	PPRP	BJT	Incumbent lost reelection.	Pongpan Yodmuangjaroen	MFP
BANGKOK METROPOLITAN	Nakhon Pathom 1 New district					Supachok Srisukajon	CT
BANGKOK METROPOLITAN	Nakhon Pathom 2 Redistricted from district 1	Sinthop Kaewpijit	Dem	UTN	Incumbent re-elected.	Sinthop Kaewpijit	UTN
BANGKOK METROPOLITAN	Nakhon Pathom 3 Redistricted from district 2	Panuwat Sasomsub	CT	CT	Incumbent re-elected.	Panuwat Sasomsub	CT
BANGKOK METROPOLITAN	Nakhon Pathom 4 Redistricted from district 3	Suttawan Suban Na Ayuthaya	FFP	MFP	Incumbent retiring.	Kittipon Panprommat	MFP
BANGKOK METROPOLITAN	Nakhon Pathom 5 Redistricted from district 4	Pathompong Soonjan	PPRP	BJT	Incumbent lost reelection.	Anucha Sasomsub	CT
BANGKOK METROPOLITAN	Nakhon Pathom 6 Redistricted from district 5	Phadermchai Sasomsub	CT	CT	Incumbent lost reelection.	Chitsanupong Tangmetakun	MFP
BANGKOK METROPOLITAN	Nonthaburi 1	Charoen Reawrang	PPRP	BJT	Incumbent lost reelection.	Surapan Waiyakorn	MFP
BANGKOK METROPOLITAN	Nonthaburi 2	Jirapong Songwatcharapon	PT	PT	Incumbent lost reelection.	Panyarat Nantaphusitanon	MFP
BANGKOK METROPOLITAN	Nonthaburi 3	Manasak Chanprasong	PT	PT	Incumbent lost reelection in district 6.	Anusorn Kaewwichain	MFP
BANGKOK METROPOLITAN	Nonthaburi 4	Montre Tangcharoenthaworn	PT	PT	Incumbent lost reelection.	Nobpadol Tibpayachol	MFP
BANGKOK METROPOLITAN	Nonthaburi 5 New district					Preeti Charoensilp	MFP
BANGKOK METROPOLITAN	Nonthaburi 6 New district					Kunakorn Munnateerai	MFP
BANGKOK METROPOLITAN	Nonthaburi 7 Redistricted from district 6	Phonnuth Sri-insuth	PT	PT	Incumbent lost reelection in district 8.	Kiatikun Tonyang	MFP
BANGKOK METROPOLITAN	Nonthaburi 8 Redistricted from district 5	Wanchai Charoennonthasit	PT	BJT	Incumbent lost reelection.	Non Paisanlimcharoenkit	MFP
BANGKOK METROPOLITAN	Pathum Thani 1	Surapong Eungampornvilai	PT	PT	Incumbent lost reelection.	Sorawee Supapanittha	MFP
BANGKOK METROPOLITAN	Pathum Thani 2 New district					Jessada Dontrisanoh	MFP
BANGKOK METROPOLITAN	Pathum Thani 3	Anawil Ratanasataporn	FFP	BJT	Incumbent lost reelection.	Chonthicha Jaengraew	MFP
BANGKOK METROPOLITAN	Pathum Thani 4 Redistricted from district 2	Supachai Nopkham	PT	PT	Incumbent lost reelection in District 2.	Sakon Suntornwanitkit	MFP
BANGKOK METROPOLITAN	Pathum Thani 5 Redistricted from district 6	Pissanu Pholtee	BJT	BJT	Incumbent lost reelection.	Manasanan Leenawarat	PT
BANGKOK METROPOLITAN	Pathum Thani 6 Redistricted from district 4	Chaiyan Phonsuwan	PT	PT	Incumbent lost reelection.	Chetawan Thuaprakhon	MFP
BANGKOK METROPOLITAN	Pathum Thani 7 Redistricted from district 5	Pornpimol Thammasan	PT	BJT	Incumbent lost reelection.	Prasit Pattamapadungsak	MFP
BANGKOK METROPOLITAN	Samut Prakan 1	Acaravat Asvahem	PPRP	PPRP	Incumbent lost reelection.	Panida Mongkonsawat	MFP
BANGKOK METROPOLITAN	Samut Prakan 2	Yongyut Suwanbut	PPRP	PPRP	Incumbent lost reelection.	Ratchanok Sukprasert	MFP
BANGKOK METROPOLITAN	Samut Prakan 3	Prim Poolcharoen	PPRP	PPRP	Incumbent lost reelection.	Pichai Changjanyawong	MFP
BANGKOK METROPOLITAN	Samut Prakan 4	Wuttinan Boonchoo	FFP	MFP	Incumbent re-elected.	Wuttinan Boonchoo	MFP
BANGKOK METROPOLITAN	Samut Prakan 5 New district					Nittaya Meesri	MFP
BANGKOK METROPOLITAN	Samut Prakan 6	Thapakorn Kuljaroen	PPRP	PPRP	Incumbent lost reelection.	Weerapat Kantha	MFP
BANGKOK METROPOLITAN	Samut Prakan 7	Pailin Teansuwan	PPRP	UTN	Incumbent lost reelection.	Boonlert Saengpan	MFP
BANGKOK METROPOLITAN	Samut Prakan 8 Redistricted from district 5	Krungsrivilai Sutinphuek	PPRP	PPRP	Incumbent lost reelection.	Traiwan Eiamjai	MFP
BANGKOK METROPOLITAN	Samut Sakhon 1	Thongdaeng Benjapak	FFP	MFP	Incumbent run as party-lists candidate.	Nattapon Sumanotham	MFP
BANGKOK METROPOLITAN	Samut Sakhon 2	Samuck Pongvong	FFP	UTN	Incumbent lost reelection in Ubon Ratchathani 7.	Sirirot Tanikkun	MFP
BANGKOK METROPOLITAN	Samut Sakhon 3	Jomkwan Klubbankoh	PPRP	PPRP	Incumbent lost reelection.	Sirasit Songnui	MFP
CENTRAL	Ang Thong 1	Paradorn Prissananantakul	BJT	BJT	Incumbent re-elected.	Paradorn Prissananantakul	BJT
CENTRAL	Ang Thong 2 New district					Kornwee Prissananantakul	BJT
CENTRAL	Chainat 1	Anucha Nakasai	PPRP	UTN	Incumbent re-elected.	Anucha Nakasai	UTN
CENTRAL	Chainat 2	Montian Songpracha	PPRP	BJT	Incumbent re-elected.	Montian Songpracha	BJT
CENTRAL	Kamphaeng Phet 1	Pai Leeke	PPRP	PPRP	Incumbent re-elected.	Pai Leeke	PPRP
CENTRAL	Kamphaeng Phet 2	Petchpoom Aponrat	PPRP	PPRP	Incumbent re-elected.	Petchpoom Aponrat	PPRP
CENTRAL	Kamphaeng Phet 3	Anun Ponumnuay	PPRP	PPRP	Incumbent re-elected.	Anun Ponumnuay	PPRP
CENTRAL	Kamphaeng Phet 4	Parinya Roekrai	PPRP	PPRP	Incumbent re-elected.	Parinya Roekrai	PPRP
CENTRAL	Lopburi 1	Pratuan Sutiamnuaydech	PPRP	BJT	Incumbent lost reelection in district 2.	Sittichai Loprasongsuk	PT
CENTRAL	Lopburi 2 New district					Satit Taveebhol	MFP
CENTRAL	Lopburi 3 Redistricted from district 2	Mallika Jirapunvanit	BJT	BJT	Incumbent re-elected.	Mallika Jirapunvanit	BJT
CENTRAL	Lopburi 4 Redistricted from district 3	Ubolsak Bualuang-ngam	PT	PT	Incumbent lost reelection.	Narin Klangpha	BJT
CENTRAL	Lopburi 5 Redistricted from district 4	Kiat Luengkhajonwit	BJT	BJT	Incumbent lost reelection.	Worawong Worapanya	PT
CENTRAL	Nakhon Nayok 1 New district					Suraphon Boonima	PT
CENTRAL	Nakhon Nayok 2	Wuttichai Kittitanaesuan	PT	BJT	Incumbent lost reelection.	Kriangkrai Kittithanesuan	PT
CENTRAL	Nakhon Sawan 1	Pinyo Niroj	PPRP	BJT	Incumbent running as party list candidate.	Krit Hiran Lert Urit Phakdi	MFP
CENTRAL	Nakhon Sawan 2	Werakorn Khumprakob	PPRP	BJT	Incumbent lost reelection.	Songsak Songsermudomchai	PT
CENTRAL	Nakhon Sawan 3	Sanya Ninsupan	PPRP	UTN	Incumbent re-elected.	Sanya Ninsupan	UTN
CENTRAL	Nakhon Sawan 4	Manop Sriphueng	BJT	BJT	Incumbent re-elected.	Manop Sriphueng	BJT
CENTRAL	Nakhon Sawan 5	Tayat Kiattichusak	PT	PT	Incumbent retiring.	Peeradej Sirivansan	BJT
CENTRAL	Nakhon Sawan 6	Niroj Soonthornleka	PPRP	UTN	Incumbent lost reelection.	Prasart Tanprasert	CPK
CENTRAL	Phetchabun 1 New district					Pimporn Pornputhipant	PPRP
CENTRAL	Phetchabun 2	Jakarat Puachuay	PPRP	PPRP	Incumbent re-elected.	Jakarat Puachuay	PPRP
CENTRAL	Phetchabun 3 New district	Pimporn Pornputhipant	PPRP	PPRP	Incumbent re-elected in district 1.	Boonchai Kittitharasup	PPRP
CENTRAL	Phetchabun 4 Redistricted from district 3	Wanpen Promphat	PPRP	PPRP	Incumbent re-elected in District 5.	Worachot Sukhonkajorn	PPRP
CENTRAL	Phetchabun 5 Redistricted from district 4	Surasak Anakkhaphan	PPRP	PPRP	Incumbent retired.	Wanpen Promphat	PPRP
CENTRAL	Phetchabun 6 Redistricted from district 5	Iam Tongjaisod	PPRP	PPRP	Incumbent retired.	Akara Tongjaisod	PPRP
CENTRAL	Phichit 1	Pornchai Insuk	PPRP	PPRP	Incumbent lost reelection.	Pattarapong Phataraprasit	BJT
CENTRAL	Phichit 2	Poodit Insuwan	PPRP	PT	Incumbent lost reelection.	Winai Phataraprasit	BJT
CENTRAL	Phichit 3	Surachat Seebutsakorn	PPRP	UTN	Incumbent lost reelection.	Siriwat Khajonprasart	BJT
CENTRAL	Phitsanulok 1	Padipat Suntiphada	FFP	MFP	Incumbent re-elected.	Padipat Suntiphada	MFP
CENTRAL	Phitsanulok 2	Noppol Leuangthongnara	PT	PT	Incumbent re-elected.	Noppol Leuangthongnara	PT
CENTRAL	Phitsanulok 3	Anucha Noiwong	PPRP	BJT	Incumbent lost reelection.	Pongmanu Thongnak	UTN
CENTRAL	Phitsanulok 4	Niyom Changpinit	PT	BJT	Incumbent lost reelection.	Pimpiccha Chai Supakit Charoen	PT
CENTRAL	Phitsanulok 5	Manus On-ey	PPRP	PPRP	Incumbent retiring.	Supapakorn Kityathikun	MFP
CENTRAL	Phra Nakhon Si Ayutthaya 1	Kuerkul Danchaivichit	BJT	BJT	Incumbent lost reelection.	Thawiwong Tothaviwong	MFP
CENTRAL	Phra Nakhon Si Ayutthaya 2	Nop Chewananth	PT	BJT	Incumbent lost reelection.	Charin Wongpanthieng	MFP
CENTRAL	Phra Nakhon Si Ayutthaya 3 New district					Pimprueda Tanjararak	BJT
CENTRAL	Phra Nakhon Si Ayutthaya 4 Redistricted from district 3	Surasak Phancharoenworakul	BJT	BJT	Incumbent re-elected.	Surasak Phancharoenworakul	BJT
CENTRAL	Phra Nakhon Si Ayutthaya 5 Redistricted from district 4	Jiratas Kraidecha	PT	PT	Incumbent lost reelection.	Pradit Sangkhai	BJT
CENTRAL	Saraburi 1	Kanlaya Rungvijitchai	PPRP	PPRP	Incumbent lost reelection.	Sorapatch Sriprach	MFP
CENTRAL	Saraburi 2	Sombut Amnaka	PPRP	UTN	Incumbent lost reelection.	Atthaphon Wongprayoon	PT
CENTRAL	Saraburi 3	Ongart Wongprayoon	PT	PPRP	Incumbent re-elected in district 4.	Watcharapong Kuwijitsuwan	BJT
CENTRAL	Saraburi 4 New district					Ongart Wongprayoon	PPRP
CENTRAL	Sing Buri 1	Chotiwut Thanakamanusorn	PPRP	PPRP	Incumbent re-elected.	Chotiwut Thanakamanusorn	PPRP
CENTRAL	Sukhothai 1	Punsiri Kullanartsiri	PPRP	PT	Incumbent re-elected.	Punsiri Kullanartsiri	PT
CENTRAL	Sukhothai 2	Choosak Keereemasthong	PPRP	PT	Incumbent re-elected.	Choosak Keereemasthong	PT
CENTRAL	Sukhothai 3 New district					Prapaporn Thongpaknam	PT
CENTRAL	Sukhothai 4 Redistricted from district 3	Somjate Limpabandhu	BJT	BJT	Incumbent lost reelection in district 3.	Jawanchai Chaiwiratnukul	PT
CENTRAL	Suphan Buri 1	Sorachud Suchitta	CT	CT	Incumbent re-elected.	Sorachud Suchitta	CT
CENTRAL	Suphan Buri 2	Nuttavood Prasertsuvan	CT	CT	Incumbent re-elected.	Nuttavood Prasertsuvan	CT
CENTRAL	Suphan Buri 3 New district					Noppadol Matsri	CT
CENTRAL	Suphan Buri 4	Samerkun Thiengtham	CT	CT	Incumbent re-elected.	Samerkun Thiengtham	CT
CENTRAL	Suphan Buri 5 Redistricted from district 3	Prapat Pothasuthon	CT	CT	Incumbent re-elected.	Prapat Pothasuthon	CT
CENTRAL	Uthai Thani 1	Jeset Thaised	BJT	BJT	Incumbent re-elected.	Jeset Thaised	BJT
CENTRAL	Uthai Thani 2	Chada Thaised	BJT	BJT	Incumbent re-elected.	Chada Thaised	BJT
EASTERN	Chachoengsao 1	Kittichai Reangsawat	FFP	BJT	Incumbent lost reelection.	Thitima Chaisaeng	PT
EASTERN	Chachoengsao 2	Chaiwat Paopiamsap	PPRP	UTN	Incumbent running as party list candidate.	Atthakorn Sirilattyakorn	PPRP
EASTERN	Chachoengsao 3	Suchart Tonjaroen	PPRP	PT	Incumbent running as party list candidate.	Sakchai Tancharoen	PT
EASTERN	Chachoengsao 4	Jirat Thongsuwan	FFP	MFP	Incumbent re-elected.	Jirat Thongsuwan	MFP
EASTERN	Chanthaburi 1	Thanapat Kittiwongsa	FFP	UTN	Incumbent lost reelection.	Warayut Thongsuk	MFP
EASTERN	Chanthaburi 2	Jaruk Srion	FFP	UTN	Incumbent lost reelection.	Prachyawan Chaisueb	MFP
EASTERN	Chanthaburi 3	Yanathicha Buapuean	FFP	MFP	Incumbent re-elected.	Yanathicha Buapuean	MFP
EASTERN	Chonburi 1	Suchart Chomklin	PPRP	UTN	Incumbent running as party list candidate.	Worat Sirirak	MFP
EASTERN	Chonburi 2 New district					Wannida Nophasit	MFP
EASTERN	Chonburi 3 Redistricted from district 2	Jongchai Wongsaithong	PPRP	PPRP	Incumbent lost reelection in District 2.	Chawan Phonchai	MFP
EASTERN	Chonburi 4	Soravuth Neangjumnong	PPRP	PT	Incumbent lost reelection.	Jirawut Singtothong	UTN
EASTERN	Chonburi 5 Redistricted from district 3	Ronnathep Anuwat	PPRP	UTN	Incumbent lost reelection.	Anan Pridasutthichit	PT
EASTERN	Chonburi 6 Redistricted from district 5	Kwanlert Panitmath	FFP	BJT	Incumbent lost reelection.	Krit Cheewathamanont	MFP
EASTERN	Chonburi 7 New district					Sahatsawat Koomkong	MFP
EASTERN	Chonburi 8 Redistricted from district 6	Charus Koomkainam	FFP	MFP	Incumbent re-elected.	Charus Koomkainam	MFP
EASTERN	Chonburi 9 Redistricted from district 7	Kawinnath Takey	FFP	PPRP	Incumbent lost reelection.	Yodchai Puengporn	MFP
EASTERN	Chonburi 10 Redistricted from district 8	Sathira Phuakpraphun	PPRP	PPRP	Incumbent re-elected.	Sathira Phuakpraphun	PPRP
EASTERN	Prachinburi 1	Amnat Vilawan	BJT	BJT	Incumbent re-elected.	Amnat Vilawan	BJT
EASTERN	Prachinburi 2	Chayuth Pummakanchana	BJT	BJT	Incumbent lost reelection.	Wuthipong Thonglao	MFP
EASTERN	Prachinburi 3	Salit Butnain	BJT	BJT	Incumbent re-elected.	Salit Butnain	BJT
EASTERN	Rayong 1 Redistricted from district 4	Somphong Sophon	PPRP	UTN	Incumbent lost reelection.	Kamonthat Kitti Sunthornsakul	MFP
EASTERN	Rayong 2 Redistricted from district 1	Sathit Pitutecha	Dem	Dem	Incumbent lost reelection.	Krit Silpachai	MFP
EASTERN	Rayong 3 Redistricted from district 2	Bunyat Chetanachan	Dem	Dem	Incumbent lost reelection.	Nakornchai Khunnarong	MFP
EASTERN	Rayong 4 Redistricted from district 3	Tara Pitutecha	Dem	Dem	Incumbent lost reelection.	Chutipong Phiphoppinyo	MFP
EASTERN	Rayong 5 New district					Sawangchit Lao Harojanphan	MFP
EASTERN	Sa Kaeo 1	Thanis Thienthong	PPRP	PPRP	Incumbent running as PAO Chief of Sa Kaeo Province candidate.	Kwanruen Thienthong	PPRP
EASTERN	Sa Kaeo 2	Treenuch Thienthong	PPRP	PPRP	Incumbent re-elected.	Treenuch Thienthong	PPRP
EASTERN	Sa Kaeo 3	Surasak Chingnawan	PPRP	PPRP	Incumbent lost reelection.	Sorawong Thienthong	PT
EASTERN	Trat 1	Sakdinai Numnu	FFP	MFP	Incumbent re-elected.	Sakdinai Numnu	MFP
NORTHEASTERN	Amnat Charoen 1	Somying Buabut	PT	PT	Incumbent lost reelection.	Suksomruay Wantaneekul	BJT
NORTHEASTERN	Amnat Charoen 2	Danai Mahipun	PT	PT	Incumbent lost reelection.	Yaneenat Khemnak	BJT
NORTHEASTERN	Bueng Kan 1 New district					Siam Pengthong	BJT
NORTHEASTERN	Bueng Kan 2	Trairong Titham	PT	PT	Incumbent lost reelection.	Suwanna Kumpiro	BJT
NORTHEASTERN	Bueng Kan 3 Redistricted from district 1	Cherdphong Rajchapongkan	PT	PT	Incumbent retired.	Niphon Khonkhayan	PT
NORTHEASTERN	Buriram 1	Sanong Thep-aksornnarong	BJT	BJT	Incumbent re-elected.	Sanong Thep-aksornnarong	BJT
NORTHEASTERN	Buriram 2 New district					Chaichanok Chidchob	BJT
NORTHEASTERN	Buriram 3 Redistricted from district 5	Adipong Thitipitaya	BJT	BJT	Incumbent re-elected.	Adipong Thitipitaya	BJT
NORTHEASTERN	Buriram 4 Redistricted from district 2	Rungsikron Timatarueka	BJT	BJT	Incumbent re-elected.	Rungsikron Timatarueka	BJT
NORTHEASTERN	Buriram 5 Redistricted from district 3	Somboon Zarum	BJT	BJT	Incumbent retired.	Sophon Zaram	BJT
NORTHEASTERN	Buriram 6 Redistricted from district 4	Sophon Zaram	BJT	BJT	Incumbent re-elected in district 5.	Sak Zaram	BJT
NORTHEASTERN	Buriram 7 New district					Pornchai Srisuriyayothin	BJT
NORTHEASTERN	Buriram 8 Redistricted from district 6	Trithep Ngamgamol	BJT	BJT	Incumbent re-elected.	Trithep Ngamgamol	BJT
NORTHEASTERN	Buriram 9 Redistricted from district 8	Rungrot Thongsri	BJT	BJT	Incumbent re-elected.	Rungrot Thongsri	BJT
NORTHEASTERN	Buriram 10 Redistricted from district 7	Jakkrid Thongsri	BJT	BJT	Incumbent re-elected.	Jakkrid Thongsri	BJT
NORTHEASTERN	Chaiyaphum 1	Ochit Kiatkongchuchai	PT	PT	Incumbent re-elected.	Ochit Kiatkongchuchai	PT
NORTHEASTERN	Chaiyaphum 2	Choengchai Chaleerin	PPRP	PT	Incumbent re-elected.	Choengchai Chaleerin	PT
NORTHEASTERN	Chaiyaphum 3	Samrit Thaensap	PPRP	BJT	Incumbent re-elected.	Samrit Thaensap	BJT
NORTHEASTERN	Chaiyaphum 4	Mana Lohavanijaya	PT	PT	Incumbent lost reelection.	Kanchana Janghwa	PPRP
NORTHEASTERN	Chaiyaphum 5 New district					Siva Pongteeradul	PT
NORTHEASTERN	Chaiyaphum 6 Redistricted from district 5	Pornpen Boonsiriwattankul	PT	PT	Incumbent lost reelection.	Chawengsak Rengpaiboonwong	BJT
NORTHEASTERN	Chaiyaphum 7 Redistricted from district 6	Surawit Khonsomboon	PT	PT	Incumbent lost reelection.	Akarasaenkhiri Lohweera	PPRP
NORTHEASTERN	Kalasin 1	Bunruen Srithares	PT	PT	Incumbent retired.	Wirat Pimpanit	PT
NORTHEASTERN	Kalasin 2	Weerawat Osathanukroh	PT	PT	Incumbent running as party list candidate.	Palakorn Pimpanit	PT
NORTHEASTERN	Kalasin 3	Komdept Chaisivamongkol	PT	PT	Incumbent retired.	Chamlong Poonnuwata	PPRP
NORTHEASTERN	Kalasin 4	Peerapet Sirikul	PT	PT	Incumbent lost reelection.	Prapa Hengpaiboon	BJT
NORTHEASTERN	Kalasin 5 New district					Thinphol Sritares	PT
NORTHEASTERN	Kalasin 6 Redistricted from district 5	Prasert Boonruang	PT	PT	Incumbent re-elected.	Prasert Bunruang	PT
NORTHEASTERN	Khon Kaen 1	Thitinan Saengnak	FFP	BJT	Incumbent lost reelection.	Weeranan Huadsri	MFP
NORTHEASTERN	Khon Kaen 2	Watthana Changlao	PPRP	BJT	Incumbent lost reelection.	Itthiphol Chontarasiri	MFP
NORTHEASTERN	Khon Kaen 3	Jatuporn Jaroenchua	PT	PT	Incumbent lost reelection.	Chatchawan Apirakmankong	MFP
NORTHEASTERN	Khon Kaen 4	Mukda Phongsombat	PT	PT	Incumbent lost reelection.	Ekkarat Changlao	BJT
NORTHEASTERN	Khon Kaen 5	Phakawat Srisurapol	PT	PT	Incumbent re-elected.	Phakawat Srisurapol	PT
NORTHEASTERN	Khon Kaen 6	Singhaphon Deenang	PT	PT	Incumbent re-elected	Singhaphon Deenang	PT
NORTHEASTERN	Khon Kaen 7	Somsak Kunngern	PPRP	PPRP	Incumbent lost reelection.	Surapot Taochareonsuk	PT
NORTHEASTERN	Khon Kaen 8 New district					Wipanee Phukamwong	PT
NORTHEASTERN	Khon Kaen 9 Redistricted from district 8	Saratsanun Unnopporn	PT	PT	Incumbent re-elected.	Saratsanun Unnopporn	PT
NORTHEASTERN	Khon Kaen 10 Redistricted from district 9	Wanniwat Somboon	PT	PT	Incumbent re-elected.	Wanniwat Somboon	PT
NORTHEASTERN	Khon Kaen 11 Redistricted from district 10	Banlang Unnopporn	PT	PPRP	Incumbent lost reelection in district 10.	Ongart Chatchaipolrat	BJT
NORTHEASTERN	Loei 1	Lertsak Pattanachaikul	PT	PT	Incumbent re-elected.	Lertsak Pattanachaikul	PT
NORTHEASTERN	Loei 2	Saran Timsuwan	PT	PT	Incumbent re-elected.	Saran Timsuwan	PT
NORTHEASTERN	Loei 3	Thanayose Thimsuwan	BJT	BJT	Incumbent re-elected.	Thanayose Thimsuwan	BJT
NORTHEASTERN	Loei 4 New district					Somjate Sangcharoenrat	PT
NORTHEASTERN	Maha Sarakham 1	Kittisak Kanasawat	PT	PT	Incumbent re-elected.	Kittisak Kanasawat	PT
NORTHEASTERN	Maha Sarakham 2	Chaiwattana Tinarat	PT	PT	Incumbent re-elected.	Chaiwattana Tinarat	PT
NORTHEASTERN	Maha Sarakham 3	Yuttapong Charasathien	PT	PT	Incumbent lost reelection.	Latthachai Chokchaiwatakorn	BJT
NORTHEASTERN	Maha Sarakham 4 New district					Sanphaphanyu Siripil	PT
NORTHEASTERN	Maha Sarakham 5 Redistricted from district 4	Jirawat Siripanich	PT	PT	Incumbent re-elected.	Jirawat Siripanich	PT
NORTHEASTERN	Maha Sarakham 6 Redistricted from district 5	Sutin Khungsang	PT	PT	Incumbent running as party list candidate.	Rat Klangsaeng	PT
NORTHEASTERN	Mukdahan 1	Anurak Tangpanitanon	PT	PT	Incumbent was suspended.	Wiriya Thongpha	PPRP
NORTHEASTERN	Mukdahan 2	Boontin Pratumlee	PT	PT	Incumbent lost reelection.	Nakorn Chareephan	MFP
NORTHEASTERN	Nakhon Phanom 1	Suphachai Phosu	BJT	BJT	Incumbent lost reelection in district 2.	Phumiphat Phacharasap	PT
NORTHEASTERN	Nakhon Phanom 2	Manaporn Chareonsri	PT	PT	Incumbent re-elected.	Manaporn Chareonsri	PT
NORTHEASTERN	Nakhon Phanom 3	Paijit Sreewarakan	PT	PT	Incumbent lost reelection.	Alongkot Maneekart	BJT
NORTHEASTERN	Nakhon Phanom 4	Chavalit Vichayasuthi	PT	TST	Incumbent lost reelection.	Chukan Kulwongsa	BJT
NORTHEASTERN	Nakhon Ratchasima 1	Kasem Supparanon	PPRP	PPRP	Incumbent lost reelection.	Chat Suphatvanich	MFP
NORTHEASTERN	Nakhon Ratchasima 2 New district					Piyachart Ruchipornwasin	MFP
NORTHEASTERN	Nakhon Ratchasima 3 Redistricted from district 2	Wacharapon Tomornsak	CPN	CPK	Incumbent lost reelection in District 2.	Suttasit Potthasak	MFP
NORTHEASTERN	Nakhon Ratchasima 4 Redistricted from district 3	Prasert Jantararuangtong	PT	PT	Incumbent running as party list candidate.	Natjira Immwiset	PT
NORTHEASTERN	Nakhon Ratchasima 5 Redistricted from district 4	Tawirat Ratanasate	PPRP	PPRP	Incumbent lost re-election.	Somkiat Tandiloktrakul	PT
NORTHEASTERN	Nakhon Ratchasima 6 Redistricted from district 5	Kosol Pattama	PT	PT	Incumbent re-elected.	Kosol Pattama	PT
NORTHEASTERN	Nakhon Ratchasima 7 Redistricted from district 6	Atirat Ratanasate	PPRP	PPRP	Incumbent running as party list candidate.	Piyanuch Yindeesuk	PT
NORTHEASTERN	Nakhon Ratchasima 8 Redistricted from district 7	Tasaneeya Ratanasate	PPRP	PPRP	Incumbent lost reelection in district 7.	Nikorn Somklang	PT
NORTHEASTERN	Nakhon Ratchasima 9 Redistricted from district 8	Thatsanaporn Ketmetheekarun	PPRP	PPRP	Incumbent lost reelection.	Polpee Suwanchawee	BJT
NORTHEASTERN	Nakhon Ratchasima 10 Redistricted from district 9	Aphicha Loedphacharakamon	BJT	PT	Incumbent re-elected.	Aphicha Loedphacharakamon	PT
NORTHEASTERN	Nakhon Ratchasima 11 Redistricted from district 10	Pornchai Amnuaisap	BJT	BJT	Incumbent lost reelection.	Arthit Wangsuphakitkosol	PT
NORTHEASTERN	Nakhon Ratchasima 12 Redistricted from district 11	Somsak Phankasem	PPRP	BJT	Incumbent lost reelection.	Noraset Sirirojanaku	PT
NORTHEASTERN	Nakhon Ratchasima 13 New district					Patchara Chanruangthong	PT
NORTHEASTERN	Nakhon Ratchasima 14 Redistricted from district 12	Sirasit Lertduailap	PT	PT	Incumbent re-elected.	Sirasit Lertduailap	PT
NORTHEASTERN	Nakhon Ratchasima 15 Redistricted from district 13	Visit Pitayaporn	BJT	BJT	Incumbent lost reelection.	Rachata Dankul	PT
NORTHEASTERN	Nakhon Ratchasima 16 Redistricted from district 14	Suchart Phinyo	PT	BJT	Incumbent lost reelection.	Pornthep Sirirojanakul	PT
NORTHEASTERN	Nong Bua Lamphu 1	Siam Hathasongkorh	PT	PT	Incumbent re-elected.	Siam Hathasongkorh	PT
NORTHEASTERN	Nong Bua Lamphu 2	Chaiya Promma	PT	PT	Incumbent re-elected.	Chaiya Promma	PT
NORTHEASTERN	Nong Bua Lamphu 3	Nattawut Kongjandee	PT	TST	Incumbent lost reelection.	Naphol Cheykhamhaeng	PT
NORTHEASTERN	Nong Khai 1	Krisda Tanterdtit	PT	PT	Incumbent lost reelection.	Kraa Trakulpornpong	PPRP
NORTHEASTERN	Nong Khai 2	Chanok Chanthathong	PT	PT	Incumbent re-elected.	Chanok Chanthathong	PT
NORTHEASTERN	Nong Khai 3	Ekthanad Inrod	PT	PT	Incumbent re-elected.	Ekthanad Inrod	PT
NORTHEASTERN	Roi Et 1	Anurak Chureemas	CT	CT	Incumbent re-elected.	Anurak Chureemas	CT
NORTHEASTERN	Roi Et 2	Chalard Kharmchaung	PT	PT	Incumbent re-elected.	Chalard Kharmchaung	PT
NORTHEASTERN	Roi Et 3	Niramit Sujaree	PT	PT	Incumbent lost reelection.	Ratchanee Phonsue	PPRP
NORTHEASTERN	Roi Et 4	Nirun Namuangruk	PT	PT	Incumbent retiring.	Narakorn Namuangruk	PT
NORTHEASTERN	Roi Et 5	Jiraporn Sindhuprai	PT	PT	Incumbent re-elected.	Jiraporn Sindhuprai	PT
NORTHEASTERN	Roi Et 6	Kitti Somsub	PT	PT	Incumbent re-elected.	Kitti Somsub	PT
NORTHEASTERN	Roi Et 7	Sakda Kongpet	PT	PT	Incumbent lost reelection.	Chatchawan Phatayathai	TST
NORTHEASTERN	Roi Et 8 New district					Chayapa Sinthuprai	PT
NORTHEASTERN	Sisaket 1	Siripong Angkasakulkait	BJT	BJT	Incumbent lost reelection.	Thanet Kruearat	PT
NORTHEASTERN	Sisaket 2	Surachart Charnpradit	PT	PT	Incumbent re-elected.	Surachart Charnpradit	PT
NORTHEASTERN	Sisaket 3	Wiwatchai Hotrawaisaya	PT	PT	Incumbent lost reelection.	Thana Kitpaiboonchai	BJT
NORTHEASTERN	Sisaket 4	Jaturong Pengnorapat	PT	PT	Incumbent retiring.	Phumin Leeteeraprasert	PT
NORTHEASTERN	Sisaket 5	Teera Traisaranakul	PT	BJT	Incumbent lost reelection.	Amornthep Sommai	PT
NORTHEASTERN	Sisaket 6 New district	Werapon Jitsumrit	PT	PT	Incumbent re-elected.	Werapon Jitsumrit	PT
NORTHEASTERN	Sisaket 7 New district					Willada Inchat	PT
NORTHEASTERN	Sisaket 8 Redistricted from district 7	Arsphol Suntraiphop	BJT	BJT	Incumbent re-elected.	Arsphol Suntraiphop	BJT
NORTHEASTERN	Sisaket 9 Redistricted from district 8	Pongsri Saejung	PT	PT	Incumbent retiring.	Nuchanart Jaruwongsathien	PT
NORTHEASTERN	Sakon Nakhon 1	Abhichart Tiraswasdichai	PT	PT	Incumbent re-elected.	Abhichart Tiraswasdichai	PT
NORTHEASTERN	Sakon Nakhon 2	Niyom Wechkama	PT	PT	Incumbent lost reelection.	Chatri Laprom	Dem
NORTHEASTERN	Sakon Nakhon 3 Redistricted from district 6	Kasem Upara	PT	PT	Incumbent re-elected in district 7.	Jiratchaya Supso	PT
NORTHEASTERN	Sakon Nakhon 4 Redistricted from district 3	Pattana Sapso	PT	PT	Incumbent re-elected.	Pattana Sapso	PT
NORTHEASTERN	Sakon Nakhon 5 Redistricted from district 4	Anurak Boonson	PT	PT	Incumbent retiring.	Chaimongkol Chairob	PPRP
NORTHEASTERN	Sakon Nakhon 6 New district					Sakuna Saranun	PT
NORTHEASTERN	Sakon Nakhon 7 Redistricted from district 5	Sakuna Saranun	PT	PT	Incumbent re-elected in District 6.	Kasem Upara	PT
NORTHEASTERN	Surin 1	Pakorn Mungcharoenporn	BJT	BJT	Incumbent re-elected.	Pakorn Mungcharoenporn	BJT
NORTHEASTERN	Surin 2	Natthaphon Charadrapheephong	PPRP	BJT	Incumbent lost reelection.	Chuchai Mungcharoenporn	PT
NORTHEASTERN	Surin 3	Kunakorn Preechachanachai	PT	PT	Incumbent lost reelection.	Pakamas Charoenphan	BJT
NORTHEASTERN	Surin 4	Teeyai Poonsrithanakul	PT	PT	Incumbent died.	Pornthep Poonsrithanakul	PT
NORTHEASTERN	Surin 5	Kroomanit Sangpoom	PT	PT	Incumbent re-elected.	Kroomanit Sangpoom	PT
NORTHEASTERN	Surin 6	Sombat Srisurin	PT	PT	Incumbent lost reelection in district 8.	Lumpert Puapattanachote	BJT
NORTHEASTERN	Surin 7 New district					Rueangwit Koonwatanapong	BJT
NORTHEASTERN	Surin 8 Redistricted from district 7	Chusak Aekthong	PT	PT	Incumbent lost reelection in district 7.	Patida Tantiratnanon	BJT
NORTHEASTERN	Ubon Ratchathani 1	Worasit Kantinan	PT	PT	Incumbent re-elected.	Worasit Kantinan	PT
NORTHEASTERN	Ubon Ratchathani 2	Wuttipong Nambutr	Dem	Dem	Incumbent re-elected.	Wuttipong Nambutr	Dem
NORTHEASTERN	Ubon Ratchathani 3 New district					Pimpakarn Polsamak	PTRP
NORTHEASTERN	Ubon Ratchathani 4 Redistricted from district 3	Kittunya Wajadee	PT	PT	Incumbent re-elected.	Kittunya Wajadee	PT
NORTHEASTERN	Ubon Ratchathani 5	Ruttakit Phaleephat	PT	PT	Incumbent lost reelection.	Suthichai Charoonnet	BJT
NORTHEASTERN	Ubon Ratchathani 6	Thanasit Khowsurat	PPRP	BJT	Incumbent lost reelection.	Thantharee Suntaphan	PT
NORTHEASTERN	Ubon Ratchathani 7	Chovit Pitakpornpunlob	PT	PT	Incumbent lost reelection in district 3.	Sudarat Phitakpornphanlop	PT
NORTHEASTERN	Ubon Ratchathani 8	Boonthida Somchai	Dem	BJT	Incumbent re-elected.	Boonthida Somchai	BJT
NORTHEASTERN	Ubon Ratchathani 9	Prapusak Jintavech	PT	PT	Incumbent lost reelection.	Rampoon Tantiwanichanont	TST
NORTHEASTERN	Ubon Ratchathani 10	Somkid Chueakong	PT	PT	Incumbent lost reelection.	Somsak Boonprachom	PTRP
NORTHEASTERN	Ubon Ratchathani 11 Redistricted from district 4	Ekkachai Songamnartcharoen	PT	PT	Incumbent lost reelection.	Tuangthip Jintawet	BJT
NORTHEASTERN	Udon Thani 1	Sarawut Phetpanomporn	PT	PT	Incumbent lost reelection.	Nattapong Pipatchaisiri	MFP
NORTHEASTERN	Udon Thani 2 New district					Hathairat Petchpanomporn	PT
NORTHEASTERN	Udon Thani 3 Redistricted from district 2	Anunt Sripunt	PT	PT	Incumbent lost reelection.	Rang Thurapon	TST
NORTHEASTERN	Udon Thani 4 Redistricted from district 3	Khajit Chainikom	PT	PT	Incumbent running as party list candidate.	Panu Pornwattana	PT
NORTHEASTERN	Udon Thani 5 Redistricted from district 4	Arporn Sarakham	PT	PT	Incumbent retiring.	Kornwee Sarakham	PT
NORTHEASTERN	Udon Thani 6 Redistricted from district 5	Chuthaphat Menasahwat	PT	PT	Incumbent lost reelection.	Adisak Kaewmungkunsub	TST
NORTHEASTERN	Udon Thani 7 Redistricted from district 6	Chakkapat Chaiyasan	PT	BJT	Incumbent lost reelection.	Thirachai Saenkaew	PT
NORTHEASTERN	Udon Thani 8 New district					Graingsak Fhayseengam	PT
NORTHEASTERN	Udon Thani 9 Redistricted from district 7	Graingsak Fhayseengam	PT	PT	Incumbent re-elected in district 8.	Watcharaphon Khaokham	PT
NORTHEASTERN	Udon Thani 10 Redistricted from district 8	Thiapjutha Khaokham	PT	PT	Incumbent re-elected.	Thiapjutha Khaokham	PT
NORTHEASTERN	Yasothon 1	Piyavat Pansaichua	PT	PT	Incumbent lost reelection.	Supaporn Slabsri	TST
NORTHEASTERN	Yasothon 2	Boonkaeo Somwong	PT	PT	Incumbent re-elected.	Boonkaeo Somwong	PT
NORTHEASTERN	Yasothon 3	Thanakorn Chaiyakul	PT	PT	Incumbent lost reelection.	Thanaphat Srichana	BJT
NORTHERN	Chiang Mai 1	Tassanee Buranupakorn	PT	PT	Incumbent lost reelection in district 3.	Phetcharat Maichompoo	MFP
NORTHERN	Chiang Mai 2 New district					Karnik Chantada	MFP
NORTHERN	Chiang Mai 3	Jakkaphon Tangsutthitham	PT	PT	Incumbent lost reelection in district 1.	Nattapon Towichakchaikul	MFP
NORTHERN	Chiang Mai 4	Vittaya Songkum	PT	PT	Incumbent lost reelection.	Putita Chaianan	MFP
NORTHERN	Chiang Mai 5	Sompong Amornvivat	PT	PT	Incumbent running as party list candidate.	Julapun Amornvivat	PT
NORTHERN	Chiang Mai 6	Julapun Amornvivat	PT	PT	Incumbent re-elected in district 5.	Oraphan Chantaruang	MFP
NORTHERN	Chiang Mai 7	Prasit Wuthinanchai	PT	PT	Incumbent retiring.	Balance Utcharoen	MFP
NORTHERN	Chiang Mai 8 Redistricted from district 2	Noppakhun Rathpatai	PT	PT	Incumbent retiring.	Pattarapong Leelaphat	MFP
NORTHERN	Chiang Mai 9 Redistricted from district 8	Srinuan Boonlue	FFP	BJT	Incumbent lost reelection.	Nares Thamrongthiphayakhun	PPRP
NORTHERN	Chiang Mai 10 Redistricted from district 9	Srires Kotkamlue	PT	PT	Incumbent retiring.	Srisopha Kotkhamlue	PT
NORTHERN	Chiang Rai 1	Ekkapob Pianpises	FFP	BJT	Incumbent lost reelection.	Chitwan Chinanuwat	MFP
NORTHERN	Chiang Rai 2 New district	Rungsun Wanchaitanawong	PT	BJT	Incumbent lost reelection in district 5.	Piyarat Tiyapairat	PT
NORTHERN	Chiang Rai 3 Redistricted from district 2	Wisit Techateerawat	PT	PT	Incumbent running as party list candidate.	Thakoon Yasaeng	MFP
NORTHERN	Chiang Rai 4 Redistricted from district 3	Visarn Techateerawat	PT	PT	Incumbent running as party list candidate.	Wisaradee Techateerawat	PT
NORTHERN	Chiang Rai 5 Redistricted from district 4	Pichet Chuamuangphan	PT	PT	Incumbent re-elected in district 7.	Thedchart Chaiphong	PT
NORTHERN	Chiang Rai 6 Redistricted from district 7	La-ong Tiyapairach	PT	PT	Incumbent running as party list candidate.	Chulalak Khansutam	MFP
NORTHERN	Chiang Rai 7 Redistricted from district 5	Peeradej Kumsamoot	FFP	BJT	Incumbent lost reelection in district 6.	Pichet Chuamuangphan	PT
NORTHERN	Lampang 1	Kittikorn Lohsoonthorn	PT	PT	Incumbent lost reelection.	Tipa Paweenasathien	MFP
NORTHERN	Lampang 2	Pairoat Lohsoonthorn	PT	PT	Incumbent running as party list candidate.	Thanathorn Lohsoonthorn	PT
NORTHERN	Lampang 3	Chratrit Chandrasurin	PT	PT	Incumbent lost reelection.	Chonthanee Chueanoi	MFP
NORTHERN	Lampang 4	Dejtawee Sriwichai	TLP	BJT	Incumbent lost reelection.	Raphatsorn Niyamosoth	MFP
NORTHERN	Lamphun 1	Sa-nguan Pongmanee	PT	PT	Incumbent lost reelection.	Wittawisit Punsuanpluk	MFP
NORTHERN	Lamphun 2	Rangsan Maneerat	PT	PT	Incumbent re-elected.	Rangsan Maneerat	PT
NORTHERN	Mae Hong Son 1	Panya Jeenakum	PPRP	PPRP	Incumbent running as party list candidate.	Pakorn Chinakham	PPRP
NORTHERN	Mae Hong Son 2 New district					Sombat Yasin	Dem
NORTHERN	Nan 1	Sirintorn Rammasute	PT	PT	Incumbent retiring.	Songyos Ramsut	PT
NORTHERN	Nan 2	Chonlanan Srikaew	PT	PT	Incumbent re-elected.	Chonlanan Srikaew	PT
NORTHERN	Nan 3	Nattapong Supriyasilp	PT	PT	Incumbent re-elected.	Nattapong Supriyasilp	PT
NORTHERN	Phayao 1	Thamanat Prompow	PPRP	PPRP	Incumbent re-elected.	Thamanat Prompow	PPRP
NORTHERN	Phayao 2	Visuth Chainaroon	PT	PT	Incumbent running as party list candidate.	Anurat Tanbanjong	PPRP
NORTHERN	Phayao 3	Jeeradech Srivirach	PPRP	PPRP	Incumbent re-elected.	Jeeradech Srivirach	PPRP
NORTHERN	Phare 1 New district					Thosaporn Sereerak	PT
NORTHERN	Phrae 2 Redistricted from district 1	Ekkarn Suesongtham	FFP	BJT	Incumbent lost reelection.	Niyom Wiwattanaditkul	PT
NORTHERN	Phrae 3 Redistricted from district 2	Kritidech Santivachirakul	FFP	BJT	Incumbent lost reelection.	Worawat Auapinyakul	PT
NORTHERN	Uttaradit 1	Kanok Limtrakool	PT	PT	Incumbent retiring.	Kritsana Seehalak	PT
NORTHERN	Uttaradit 2	Sarunwut Sarunyagate	PT	UTN	Incumbent lost reelection in district 3.	Warut Siriwat	PT
NORTHERN	Uttaradit 3 New district					Rawee Lek-uthai	PT
SOUTHERN	Chumphon 1	Issarapong Makampai	Dem	Dem	Incumbent lost reelection.	Wichai Sudsawat	UTN
SOUTHERN	Chumphon 2	Sarawut Onlamai	Dem	Dem	Incumbent lost reelection.	Sant Saetang	UTN
SOUTHERN	Chumphon 3	Supol Jullasai	ACT	UTN	Incumbent re-elected.	Supol Jullasai	UTN
SOUTHERN	Krabi 1	Sakorn Kiewkhong	Dem	Dem	Incumbent lost reelection in district 2.	Kitti Kittithornkul	BJT
SOUTHERN	Krabi 2 New district					Thiradet Tangmankorkit	BJT
SOUTHERN	Krabi 3 Redistricted from district 2	Saritpong Kiewkong	BJT	BJT	Incumbent re-elected.	Saritpong Kiewkong	BJT
SOUTHERN	Nakhon Si Thammarat 1	Rong Boonsuaykhwan	PPRP	PPRP	Incumbent lost reelection.	Rachit Sudpoom	Dem
SOUTHERN	Nakhon Si Thammarat 2 Redistricted from district 7	Sayan Yutithum	PPRP	UTN	Incumbent lost reelection.	Songsak Musikong	Dem
SOUTHERN	Nakhon Si Thammarat 3 Redistricted from district 2	Sanhaphot Suksrimuang	PPRP	PPRP	Incumbent lost reelection.	Pitakdej Dejdecho	Dem
SOUTHERN	Nakhon Si Thammarat 4 Redistricted from district 3	Aryasit Srisuwan	PPRP	PPRP	Incumbent lost reelection.	Yuttakarn Rattanamas	Dem
SOUTHERN	Nakhon Si Thammarat 5 Redistricted from district 6	Chaichana Dejdecho	Dem	Dem	Incumbent re-elected.	Chaichana Dejdecho	Dem
SOUTHERN	Nakhon Si Thammarat 6 Redistricted from district 4	Prakob Rattanapan	Dem	Dem	Incumbent lost reelection.	Sutham Jaritngam	PPRP
SOUTHERN	Nakhon Si Thammarat 7 New district					Shatha Khaokham	BJT
SOUTHERN	Nakhon Si Thammarat 8 Redistricted from district 5	Chinnaworn Boonyakiat	Dem	Dem	Incumbent lost reelection in district 7.	Mukdawan Leungsinin	BJT
SOUTHERN	Nakhon Si Thammarat 9 New district					Aoypornsri Chaowalit	Dem
SOUTHERN	Nakhon Si Thammarat 10 Redistricted from district 8	Pimphattra Wichaikul	Dem	UTN	Incumbent re-elected.	Pimphattra Wichaikul	UTN
SOUTHERN	Narathiwat 1	Watchara Yaworhasan	PPRP	UTN	Incumbent re-elected.	Watchara Yaworhasan	UTN
SOUTHERN	Narathiwat 2 New district					Amin Mayusoh	PPRP
SOUTHERN	Narathiwat 3 Redistricted from district 2	Samphan Mayusoh	PPRP	PPRP	Incumbent re-elected.	Samphan Mayusoh	PPRP
SOUTHERN	Narathiwat 4 Redistricted from district 3	Kuheng Yawohasun	PCC	PCC	Incumbent lost reelection.	Zakariya Sa-i	BJT
SOUTHERN	Narathiwat 5 Redistricted from district 4	Kamonsak Leewamoh	PCC	PCC	Incumbent re-elected.	Kamonsak Leewamoh	PCC
SOUTHERN	Pattani 1	Anwar Salaeh	Dem	PPRP	Incumbent lost reelection in district 5.	Woravit Baru	PCC
SOUTHERN	Pattani 2	Abdulbasim Aboo	BJT	BJT	Incumbent lost reelection.	Kosey Mamu	PPRP
SOUTHERN	Pattani 3 Redistricted from district 4	Sommut Benjalak	PCC	PCC	Incumbent re-elected.	Sommut Benjalak	PCC
SOUTHERN	Pattani 4 Redistricted from district 3	Anumat Soosaro	PCC	UTN	Incumbent retiring.	Yunaidee Waba	Dem
SOUTHERN	Pattani 5 New district					Sahe Muhammad Al-Idrus	PCC
SOUTHERN	Phang Nga 1 New district					Atthaphon Trisri	BJT
SOUTHERN	Phang Nga 2 Redistricted from district 1	Kantawan Tanthien	Dem	Dem	Incumbent lost reelection in district 1.	Chakaj Pattanakitwibul	PPRP
SOUTHERN	Phatthalung 1	Poomsit Kongmee	BJT	BJT	Incumbent was suspended.	Supatchee Thammaphet	Dem
SOUTHERN	Phatthalung 2	Chalong Toedweerapong	BJT	BJT	Incumbent was suspended.	Nitisak Thammaphet	UTN
SOUTHERN	Phatthalung 3	Narit Khumnurak	Dem	Dem	Incumbent running as party list candidate.	Romtham Khamnurak	Dem
SOUTHERN	Phuket 1	Suta Prateep Na Thalang	PPRP	PPRP	Incumbent lost reelection in district 2.	Somchat Techathavorncharoen	MFP
SOUTHERN	Phuket 2 New district					Chalermpong Saengdee	MFP
SOUTHERN	Phuket 3 Redistricted from district 2	Nattee Thinsaku	PPRP	PPRP	Incumbent lost reelection.	Thitikan Thitipruekthikul	MFP
SOUTHERN	Ranong 1	Kongkrit Chatmaleerat	BJT	BJT	Incumbent re-elected.	Kongkrit Chatmaleerat	BJT
SOUTHERN	Satun 1	Phiboon Ratchakitpakarn	BJT	BJT	Incumbent re-elected.	Phiboon Ratchakitpakarn	BJT
SOUTHERN	Satun 2	Worasit Liangprasit	BJT	BJT	Incumbent re-elected.	Worasit Liangprasit	BJT
SOUTHERN	Songkhla 1	Wanchai Parinyasiri	PPRP	PPRP	Incumbent running as Mayor of Songkhla City Municipality candidate.	Sanphet Bunyamanee	Dem
SOUTHERN	Songkhla 2	Sarttra Sripan	PPRP	UTN	Incumbent re-elected.	Sarttra Sripan	UTN
SOUTHERN	Songkhla 3	Payom Promphet	PPRP	UTN	Incumbent lost reelection.	Somyot Plaidung	Dem
SOUTHERN	Songkhla 4	Arun Sawasdee	PPRP	UTN	Incumbent lost reelection.	Chonnaphat Naksua	PPRP
SOUTHERN	Songkhla 5	Dej-is Khaothong	Dem	Dem	Incumbent re-elected.	Dej-is Khaothong	Dem
SOUTHERN	Songkhla 6	Suphaporn Kamnerdphol	Dem	Dem	Incumbent re-elected.	Suphaporn Kamnerdphol	Dem
SOUTHERN	Songkhla 7	Natchanon Srikokuea	BJT	BJT	Incumbent re-elected.	Natchanon Srikokuea	BJT
SOUTHERN	Songkhla 8	Surin Palarae	Dem	Dem	Incumbent re-elected.	Surin Palarae	Dem
SOUTHERN	Songkhla 9 New district					Saksit Khaothong	Dem
SOUTHERN	Surat Thani 1	Panu Sribusayakarn	Dem	Dem	Incumbent lost reelection.	Kansinee Opas Rangsan	UTN
SOUTHERN	Surat Thani 2	Wiwat Nilwatcharamanee	Dem	Dem	Incumbent lost reelection.	Pipit Rattanarak	UTN
SOUTHERN	Surat Thani 3	Wachiraporn Kanjana	Dem	UTN	Incumbent re-elected.	Wachiraporn Kanjana	UTN
SOUTHERN	Surat Thani 4	Somchart Pradidporn	Dem	Dem	Incumbent lost reelection.	Pansak Boontan	UTN
SOUTHERN	Surat Thani 5	Sinit Lertkrai	Dem	Dem	Incumbent lost reelection.	Paramet Jina	UTN
SOUTHERN	Surat Thani 6	Teerapat Pringsulaka	Dem	Dem	Incumbent lost reelection.	Pichai Chompupon	BJT
SOUTHERN	Surat Thani 7 New district					Thanin Nuanwat	UTN
SOUTHERN	Trang 1	Nipan Siritorn	PPRP	PPRP	Incumbent running as party list candidate.	Thanompong Leekpai	UTN
SOUTHERN	Trang 2	Satit Wongnongtaey	Dem	Dem	Incumbent lost reelection.	Thawee Suraban	PPRP
SOUTHERN	Trang 3 New district					Sunutcha Losathapornpipit	Dem
SOUTHERN	Trang 4 Redistricted from district 3	Sunutcha Losathapornpipit	Dem	Dem	Incumbent re-elected in district 3.	Karn Tangpong	Dem
SOUTHERN	Yala 1	Adilan Ali-ishak	PPRP	PPRP	Incumbent lost reelection.	Sulaiman Buenapenae	PCC
SOUTHERN	Yala 2	Sugarno Matha	PCC	PCC	Incumbent re-elected.	Sugarno Matha	PCC
SOUTHERN	Yala 3	Abdul-ayee Samang	PCC	PCC	Incumbent re-elected.	Abdul-ayee Samang	PCC
WESTERN	Kanchanaburi 1	Somchai Wisnuwong	PPRP	BJT	Incumbent lost reelection.	Akaranan Kankittinan	PT
WESTERN	Kanchanaburi 2	Somkiat Woonphian	PPRP	BJT	Incumbent lost reelection.	Chusak Mantim	PT
WESTERN	Kanchanaburi 3	Yossawat Mapaisansin	BJT	BJT	Incumbent re-elected.	Yossawat Mapaisansin	BJT
WESTERN	Kanchanaburi 4	Thammawit Phothiphiphit	PPRP	BJT	Incumbent lost reelection.	Sakda Wichiansilp	PT
WESTERN	Kanchanaburi 5	Attaphol Pothitpipit	PPRP	BJT	Incumbent lost reelection.	Phanom Phokaew	PT
WESTERN	Phetchaburi 1	Krit Kaewyoo	PPRP	BJT	Incumbent lost reelection.	Thiwanrat Angkinan	UTN
WESTERN	Phetchaburi 2	Satit Ouitragool	PPRP	UTN	Incumbent lost reelection.	Rerk Udee	BJT
WESTERN	Phetchaburi 3	Suchat Usaha	PPRP	BJT	Incumbent lost reelection.	Apichat Kaewkosol	UTN
WESTERN	Prachuap Khiri Khan 1	Montree Panoinon	Dem	Dem	Incumbent lost reelection.	Sangkhom Daengchot	BJT
WESTERN	Prachuap Khiri Khan 2	Pornthep Visutvattanasak	PT	PT	Incumbent lost reelection.	Chakkapan Piyapornpaiboon	Dem
WESTERN	Prachuap Khiri Khan 3	Pramual Pongthavaradet	Dem	Dem	Incumbent re-elected.	Pramual Pongthavaradet	Dem
WESTERN	Ratchaburi 1	Kulvaree Nopamornbodee	PPRP	UTN	Incumbent re-elected.	Kulvaree Nopamornbodee	UTN
WESTERN	Ratchaburi 2	Boonying Nitikanchana	PPRP	PPRP	Incumbent re-elected.	Boonying Nitikanchana	PPRP
WESTERN	Ratchaburi 3	Chaithip Kamolpanthip	Dem	PPRP	Incumbent re-elected in district 5.	Jatuporn Kamonphanthip	PPRP
WESTERN	Ratchaburi 4	Akradech Wongpituchroj	Dem	UTN	Incumbent re-elected.	Akradech Wongpituchroj	UTN
WESTERN	Ratchaburi 5	Boonlue Prasertsopar	BJT	BJT	Incumbent lost reelection.	Chaithip Kamolpanthip	PPRP
WESTERN	Samut Songkhram 1	Rangsima Rodrasamee	Dem	UTN	Incumbent lost reelection.	Arnupap Likitamnuaychai	MFP
WESTERN	Tak 1	Thanat Thawikuekulkit	PPRP	BJT	Incumbent lost reelection.	Krit Paniam	MFP
WESTERN	Tak 2	Chaiwuti Bannawat	Dem	Dem	Incumbent retiring.	Ratchaphong Soisuwan	MFP
WESTERN	Tak 3	Pakpoom Boonpramuk	PPRP	PPRP	Incumbent re-elected.	Pakpoom Boonpramuk	PPRP

=== Detailed results ===
Results by Constituency - 2023 Thai general election
Constituency		Winning party							Votes (Note: Minor political parties are aggregated under "Other")												
Province	#	1st place	Votes	Share	Margin #	Margin %	2nd place	3rd place	MFP	PTP	BJT	PPP	UTN	DP	TST	CTP	PCC	CPK	PTR	Other	Total
Krabi	1	Bhumjaithai	39,520	41.00%	8,643	8.97%	Democrat	Move Forward	15,211	2,388	39,520	417	6,308	30,877	561	0	0	0	0	1,109	96,391
Krabi	2	Bhumjaithai	44,378	50.92%	30,475	34.97%	Palang Pracharath	Democrat	10,038	1,976	44,378	13,903	3,234	12,439	0	0	0	0	0	1,190	87,158
Krabi	3	Bhumjaithai	52,499	55.85%	27,015	28.74%	Democrat	Move Forward	9,481	2,656	52,499	829	2,423	25,484	0	0	0	0	0	629	94,001
Bangkok	1	Move Forward	37,438	41.56%	19,177	21.29%	United Thai Nation	Pheu Thai	37,438	15,289	656	1,495	18,261	11,544	2,368	0	0	1,247	0	1,794	90,092
Bangkok	2	Move Forward	41,148	44.63%	23,240	25.21%	United Thai Nation	Pheu Thai	41,148	12,235	5,237	2,631	17,908	7,392	1,400	486	0	1,567	0	2,194	92,198
Bangkok	3	Move Forward	35,189	41.75%	18,956	22.49%	United Thai Nation	Pheu Thai	35,189	14,833	668	546	16,233	10,515	1,099	735	0	2,333	0	2,132	84,283
Bangkok	4	Move Forward	33,381	39.10%	18,473	21.64%	Democrat	United Thai Nation	33,381	10,901	9,643	506	12,992	14,908	589	0	0	983	0	1,465	85,368
Bangkok	5	Move Forward	47,147	49.59%	31,261	32.88%	United Thai Nation	Pheu Thai	47,147	15,443	9,693	763	15,886	1,835	783	0	0	1,627	0	1,901	95,078
Bangkok	6	Move Forward	46,082	44.60%	22,042	21.33%	United Thai Nation	Pheu Thai	46,082	16,718	3,361	1,939	24,040	3,966	921	646	0	1,460	0	4,181	103,314
Bangkok	7	Move Forward	45,049	47.43%	20,166	21.23%	United Thai Nation	Pheu Thai	45,049	17,267	391	1,296	24,883	2,283	618	0	0	1,287	0	1,902	94,976
Bangkok	8	Move Forward	40,011	38.64%	14,837	14.33%	Pheu Thai	United Thai Nation	40,011	25,174	811	5,431	18,207	8,261	896	0	0	2,259	0	2,499	103,549
Bangkok	9	Move Forward	50,132	49.19%	29,559	29.00%	Pheu Thai	United Thai Nation	50,132	20,573	1,006	2,475	18,866	2,372	2,026	0	0	2,415	0	2,056	101,921
Bangkok	10	Move Forward	38,313	38.41%	15,821	15.86%	Thai Sang Thai	Pheu Thai	38,313	14,745	316	895	11,065	9,545	22,492	385	0	751	0	1,229	99,736
Bangkok	11	Move Forward	36,985	37.31%	14,743	14.87%	Thai Sang Thai	Bhumjaithai	36,985	14,325	14,645	827	7,658	879	22,242	0	0	402	0	1,153	99,116
Bangkok	12	Move Forward	45,797	44.91%	27,164	26.64%	Pheu Thai	United Thai Nation	45,797	18,633	922	5,245	13,608	12,405	1,426	438	0	1,077	0	2,424	101,975
Bangkok	13	Move Forward	43,186	44.87%	20,874	21.69%	Pheu Thai	United Thai Nation	43,186	22,312	2,378	661	17,591	5,380	1,379	0	0	1,361	0	2,001	96,249
Bangkok	14	Move Forward	42,218	43.13%	13,112	13.39%	United Thai Nation	Pheu Thai	42,218	17,530	1,103	1,363	29,106	1,812	1,886	0	0	1,495	0	1,378	97,891
Bangkok	15	Move Forward	35,904	38.95%	7,782	8.44%	Pheu Thai	United Thai Nation	35,904	28,122	891	646	15,111	2,311	6,613	0	0	919	0	1,655	92,172
Bangkok	16	Move Forward	40,129	41.05%	13,018	13.32%	Pheu Thai	Democrat	40,129	27,111	603	560	12,357	12,784	924	0	0	880	0	2,404	97,752
Bangkok	17	Move Forward	30,439	37.17%	11,284	13.78%	Pheu Thai	Palang Pracharath	30,439	19,155	549	18,034	6,340	1,051	398	2,930	0	486	0	2,516	81,898
Bangkok	18	Move Forward	36,884	43.36%	19,648	23.10%	Pheu Thai	Palang Pracharath	36,884	17,236	924	14,843	8,930	1,857	409	304	0	714	0	2,969	85,070
Bangkok	19	Move Forward	41,841	43.34%	15,171	15.72%	Pheu Thai	United Thai Nation	41,841	26,670	875	3,411	17,176	2,144	714	0	0	752	0	2,952	96,535
Bangkok	20	Pheu Thai	34,749	40.36%	4	0.00%	Move Forward	United Thai Nation	34,745	34,749	1,017	893	9,446	1,501	708	265	0	790	0	1,978	86,092
Bangkok	21	Move Forward	44,959	47.06%	28,463	29.79%	Democrat	Pheu Thai	44,959	14,694	1,010	785	13,518	16,496	720	360	0	807	0	2,190	95,539
Bangkok	22	Move Forward	43,083	46.50%	26,706	28.82%	United Thai Nation	Pheu Thai	43,083	13,466	7,283	2,113	16,377	6,526	1,023	0	0	1,038	0	1,742	92,651
Bangkok	23	Move Forward	47,225	46.60%	29,269	28.88%	United Thai Nation	Pheu Thai	47,225	17,100	1,002	3,314	17,956	4,547	5,308	1,323	0	1,487	0	2,081	101,343
Bangkok	24	Move Forward	48,317	49.39%	29,997	30.67%	United Thai Nation	Pheu Thai	48,317	17,316	775	2,033	18,320	6,284	1,693	456	0	728	0	1,896	97,818
Bangkok	25	Move Forward	35,623	40.08%	7,434	8.37%	Pheu Thai	United Thai Nation	35,623	28,189	670	1,808	12,264	5,517	1,313	396	0	1,127	0	1,962	88,869
Bangkok	26	Move Forward	46,570	48.16%	26,757	27.67%	Pheu Thai	United Thai Nation	46,570	19,813	2,282	362	13,150	8,892	3,722	488	0	470	0	959	96,708
Bangkok	27	Move Forward	50,035	51.19%	26,684	27.30%	Democrat	Pheu Thai	50,035	13,593	252	717	6,973	23,351	959	345	0	527	0	1,001	97,753
Bangkok	28	Move Forward	47,592	47.01%	21,113	20.85%	Pheu Thai	Democrat	47,592	26,479	380	646	10,579	11,405	2,041	0	0	681	0	1,442	101,245
Bangkok	29	Move Forward	47,652	46.01%	24,111	23.28%	Pheu Thai	United Thai Nation	47,652	23,541	558	1,948	15,700	5,045	1,959	0	0	5,772	0	1,386	103,561
Bangkok	30	Move Forward	49,770	49.88%	25,250	25.30%	Pheu Thai	United Thai Nation	49,770	24,520	577	645	15,783	2,633	2,356	0	0	1,273	0	2,231	99,788
Bangkok	31	Move Forward	46,405	44.07%	22,788	21.64%	United Thai Nation	Pheu Thai	46,405	18,479	1,357	2,088	23,617	3,591	4,642	0	0	1,367	0	3,763	105,309
Bangkok	32	Move Forward	43,115	44.72%	24,379	25.29%	Pheu Thai	United Thai Nation	43,115	18,736	1,597	935	14,888	11,633	958	482	0	1,383	0	2,675	96,402
Bangkok	33	Move Forward	45,189	43.35%	26,561	25.48%	United Thai Nation	Democrat	45,189	15,053	4,100	1,041	18,628	15,817	1,078	0	0	791	0	2,534	104,231
Kanchanaburi	1	Pheu Thai	33,183	33.65%	7,463	7.57%	Move Forward	Palang Pracharath	25,720	33,183	7,879	19,856	9,538	726	498	0	0	0	0	1,223	98,623
Kanchanaburi	2	Pheu Thai	23,278	22.73%	3,113	3.04%	Palang Pracharath	Bhumjaithai	17,531	23,278	18,951	20,165	2,608	18,196	366	0	0	184	0	1,149	102,428
Kanchanaburi	3	Bhumjaithai	44,813	41.72%	780	0.73%	Pheu Thai	Move Forward	14,071	44,033	44,813	910	1,501	999	270	0	0	0	0	829	107,426
Kanchanaburi	4	Pheu Thai	45,812	47.59%	18,346	19.06%	Palang Pracharath	Move Forward	16,125	45,812	1,730	27,466	1,686	693	1,796	0	0	0	0	948	96,256
Kanchanaburi	5	Pheu Thai	31,164	38.08%	9,818	12.00%	Palang Pracharath	Move Forward	15,983	31,164	8,270	21,346	2,268	796	418	0	0	0	0	1,592	81,837
Kalasin	1	Pheu Thai	56,569	62.95%	33,530	37.31%	Move Forward	Bhumjaithai	23,039	56,569	3,901	891	2,485	465	976	0	0	0	0	1,537	89,863
Kalasin	2	Pheu Thai	49,784	57.15%	26,289	30.18%	Thai Sang Thai	Move Forward	10,427	49,784	123	1,398	849	288	23,495	0	0	0	0	741	87,105
Kalasin	3	Palang Pracharath	37,044	45.81%	15,440	19.09%	Pheu Thai	Move Forward	17,936	21,604	503	37,044	1,444	551	0	0	0	0	0	1,789	80,871
Kalasin	4	Bhumjaithai	31,536	35.03%	4,770	5.30%	Pheu Thai	Move Forward	22,020	26,766	31,536	1,804	5,700	563	594	0	0	0	0	1,047	90,030
Kalasin	5	Pheu Thai	39,998	43.71%	7,712	8.43%	Palang Pracharath	Move Forward	15,178	39,998	714	32,286	631	216	340	0	0	0	0	2,143	91,506
Kalasin	6	Pheu Thai	44,002	49.55%	21,067	23.72%	Move Forward	Palang Pracharath	22,935	44,002	2,285	9,596	5,010	530	2,466	0	0	0	0	1,979	88,803
Kamphaeng Phet	1	Palang Pracharath	36,187	37.33%	7,243	7.47%	Move Forward	Pheu Thai	28,944	18,462	0	36,187	10,693	934	424	0	0	0	0	1,284	96,928
Kamphaeng Phet	2	Palang Pracharath	41,143	43.01%	16,947	17.72%	Move Forward	Pheu Thai	24,196	18,465	0	41,143	6,214	831	3,999	0	0	0	0	816	95,664
Kamphaeng Phet	3	Palang Pracharath	37,149	42.39%	17,523	20.00%	Pheu Thai	Move Forward	19,584	19,626	0	37,149	3,943	2,568	908	0	0	0	0	3,851	87,629
Kamphaeng Phet	4	Palang Pracharath	36,132	39.98%	14,391	15.92%	Pheu Thai	Move Forward	19,232	21,741	0	36,132	11,067	620	0	0	0	0	0	1,580	90,372
Khon Kaen	1	Move Forward	39,046	42.53%	12,454	13.57%	Pheu Thai	United Thai Nation	39,046	26,592	1,068	4,015	16,129	873	1,544	0	0	0	0	2,532	91,799
Khon Kaen	2	Move Forward	38,984	38.70%	10,482	10.41%	Pheu Thai	Bhumjaithai	38,984	28,502	23,515	1,153	5,302	858	0	0	0	0	0	2,413	100,727
Khon Kaen	3	Move Forward	36,731	39.39%	6,646	7.13%	Chart Thai Pattana	Pheu Thai	36,731	17,576	3,446	517	1,802	194	603	30,085	0	0	0	2,285	93,239
Khon Kaen	4	Bhumjaithai	33,104	34.98%	6,156	6.50%	Move Forward	Pheu Thai	26,948	26,416	33,104	1,140	1,619	297	387	0	0	0	0	4,728	94,639
Khon Kaen	5	Pheu Thai	50,429	60.72%	31,302	37.69%	Move Forward	United Thai Nation	19,127	50,429	573	1,926	4,212	854	594	0	0	0	0	5,335	83,050
Khon Kaen	6	Pheu Thai	29,293	33.85%	74	0.09%	Bhumjaithai	Move Forward	16,543	29,293	29,219	7,321	1,823	345	218	0	0	0	0	1,777	86,539
Khon Kaen	7	Pheu Thai	37,980	40.67%	15,490	16.59%	Palang Pracharath	Move Forward	16,263	37,980	12,777	22,490	775	198	979	0	0	0	0	1,931	93,393
Khon Kaen	8	Pheu Thai	43,191	44.73%	23,312	24.14%	Move Forward	Palang Pracharath	19,879	43,191	6,064	17,888	6,174	647	378	0	0	432	0	1,901	96,554
Khon Kaen	9	Pheu Thai	46,057	55.47%	30,916	37.23%	Move Forward	Bhumjaithai	15,141	46,057	8,934	7,821	3,052	461	0	0	0	0	0	1,570	83,036
Khon Kaen	10	Pheu Thai	44,173	50.25%	19,877	22.61%	Palang Pracharath	Move Forward	15,185	44,173	232	24,296	1,482	381	0	0	0	170	0	1,985	87,904
Khon Kaen	11	Bhumjaithai	37,529	41.27%	4,665	5.13%	Pheu Thai	Move Forward	12,029	32,864	37,529	1,271	6,270	373	0	0	0	0	0	608	90,944
Chanthaburi	1	Move Forward	37,600	34.86%	11,545	10.70%	Palang Pracharath	United Thai Nation	37,600	14,473	4,359	26,055	15,930	5,629	2,411	0	0	0	0	1,416	107,873
Chanthaburi	2	Move Forward	34,894	35.15%	3,284	3.31%	Pheu Thai	Democrat	34,894	31,610	0	1,090	10,992	18,322	0	0	0	0	0	2,356	99,264
Chanthaburi	3	Move Forward	35,428	35.92%	14,909	15.12%	Palang Pracharath	Bhumjaithai	35,428	15,375	18,022	20,519	5,959	1,495	724	0	0	0	0	1,100	98,622
Chachoengsao	1	Pheu Thai	35,488	30.45%	2,488	2.13%	United Thai Nation	Move Forward	26,001	35,488	1,223	13,595	33,000	1,409	0	4,151	0	0	0	1,669	116,536
Chachoengsao	2	Palang Pracharath	42,777	38.15%	1,992	1.78%	Pheu Thai	Move Forward	22,793	40,785	387	42,777	2,798	1,715	0	0	0	0	0	878	112,133
Chachoengsao	3	Pheu Thai	45,874	43.43%	10,988	10.40%	United Thai Nation	Move Forward	21,955	45,874	141	928	34,886	507	0	0	0	0	0	1,332	105,623
Chachoengsao	4	Move Forward	37,381	32.13%	10,508	9.03%	Palang Pracharath	United Thai Nation	37,381	22,850	942	26,873	26,415	874	0	0	0	0	0	1,011	116,346
Chonburi	1	Move Forward	36,462	36.45%	3,919	3.92%	United Thai Nation	Pheu Thai	36,462	27,786	445	540	32,543	751	434	0	0	0	0	1,084	100,045
Chonburi	2	Move Forward	30,162	35.54%	6,781	7.99%	United Thai Nation	Pheu Thai	30,162	20,667	275	8,612	23,381	528	362	0	0	0	0	888	84,875
Chonburi	3	Move Forward	33,183	35.04%	3,088	3.26%	Pheu Thai	United Thai Nation	33,183	30,095	635	2,359	25,623	505	926	0	0	0	0	1,373	94,699
Chonburi	4	United Thai Nation	36,128	40.89%	11,293	12.78%	Move Forward	Pheu Thai	24,835	24,431	331	450	36,128	1,062	395	0	0	0	0	723	88,355
Chonburi	5	Pheu Thai	41,939	39.84%	8,125	7.72%	United Thai Nation	Move Forward	24,038	41,939	367	3,369	33,814	459	546	0	0	0	0	743	105,275
Chonburi	6	Move Forward	37,572	38.50%	9,693	9.93%	Pheu Thai	United Thai Nation	37,572	27,879	4,538	367	24,158	774	320	0	0	0	0	1,970	97,578
Chonburi	7	Move Forward	40,918	45.96%	11,935	13.41%	Pheu Thai	United Thai Nation	40,918	28,983	641	421	13,900	608	833	0	0	0	0	2,723	89,027
Chonburi	8	Move Forward	35,270	38.36%	2,571	2.80%	Pheu Thai	United Thai Nation	35,270	32,699	515	493	18,269	1,860	457	0	0	0	0	2,371	91,934
Chonburi	9	Move Forward	30,459	41.82%	11,132	15.28%	Pheu Thai	United Thai Nation	30,459	19,327	659	807	19,253	544	365	0	0	0	0	1,426	72,840
Chonburi	10	Palang Pracharath	27,461	31.22%	74	0.08%	Pheu Thai	Move Forward	25,957	27,387	356	27,461	5,087	419	455	0	0	0	0	839	87,961
Chai Nat	1	United Thai Nation	43,935	46.25%	16,438	17.31%	Move Forward	Pheu Thai	27,497	16,410	792	0	43,935	1,744	644	0	0	3,236	0	730	94,988
Chai Nat	2	Bhumjaithai	52,205	54.36%	31,529	32.83%	Move Forward	Pheu Thai	20,676	16,352	52,205	1,995	1,581	529	910	0	0	1,124	0	670	96,042
Chaiyaphum	1	Pheu Thai	26,130	28.68%	1,883	2.07%	Move Forward	Palang Pracharath	24,247	26,130	226	21,888	2,846	374	0	0	0	0	0	15,396	91,107
Chaiyaphum	2	Pheu Thai	61,414	67.43%	43,591	47.86%	Move Forward	Palang Pracharath	17,823	61,414	115	6,877	2,540	739	550	0	0	0	0	1,025	91,083
Chaiyaphum	3	Bhumjaithai	35,846	42.55%	16,704	19.83%	Pheu Thai	Palang Pracharath	12,303	19,142	35,846	14,246	1,170	330	745	0	0	0	0	467	84,249
Chaiyaphum	4	Palang Pracharath	21,432	27.98%	2,586	3.38%	Bhumjaithai	Pheu Thai	14,817	16,755	18,846	21,432	1,422	422	2,021	0	0	0	0	881	76,596
Chaiyaphum	5	Pheu Thai	35,000	40.01%	3,822	4.37%	Palang Pracharath	Move Forward	15,634	35,000	212	31,178	937	1,056	2,524	0	0	0	0	929	87,470
Chaiyaphum	6	Bhumjaithai	38,452	41.68%	15,636	16.95%	Pheu Thai	Move Forward	15,439	22,816	38,452	2,185	908	264	11,233	0	0	0	0	964	92,261
Chaiyaphum	7	Palang Pracharath	38,498	45.04%	15,518	18.15%	Move Forward	Pheu Thai	22,980	15,201	161	38,498	1,162	245	5,606	990	0	0	0	636	85,479
Chumphon	1	United Thai Nation	36,222	35.34%	4,138	4.04%	Democrat	Palang Pracharath	13,645	1,963	398	15,592	36,222	32,084	490	0	0	0	0	2,116	102,510
Chumphon	2	United Thai Nation	32,500	31.94%	7,268	7.14%	Palang Pracharath	Democrat	14,211	2,447	4,007	25,232	32,500	15,518	414	0	0	4,845	0	2,585	101,759
Chumphon	3	United Thai Nation	41,231	43.55%	13,817	14.59%	Democrat	Move Forward	16,650	4,411	780	1,438	41,231	27,414	657	0	0	0	0	2,097	94,678
Chiang Rai	1	Move Forward	43,153	41.95%	7,053	6.86%	Pheu Thai	Bhumjaithai	43,153	36,100	15,644	580	3,993	605	873	0	0	0	0	1,913	102,861
Chiang Rai	2	Pheu Thai	55,778	57.99%	22,693	23.59%	Move Forward	United Thai Nation	33,085	55,778	1,017	1,216	2,738	292	872	0	0	0	0	1,194	96,192
Chiang Rai	3	Move Forward	25,056	24.67%	1,672	1.65%	Pheu Thai	Palang Pracharath	25,056	23,384	10,400	15,091	2,669	620	9,544	14,096	0	0	0	715	101,575
Chiang Rai	4	Pheu Thai	39,589	37.34%	14,087	13.29%	Move Forward	Chart Thai Pattana	25,502	39,589	8,335	1,371	2,417	699	7,801	19,199	0	0	0	1,098	106,011
Chiang Rai	5	Pheu Thai	35,162	36.17%	8,089	8.32%	Bhumjaithai	Move Forward	18,181	35,162	27,073	13,620	862	907	397	0	0	0	0	1,023	97,225
Chiang Rai	6	Move Forward	31,789	39.51%	13,762	17.10%	Pheu Thai	Bhumjaithai	31,789	18,027	16,011	9,913	2,105	1,127	453	0	0	0	0	1,036	80,461
Chiang Rai	7	Pheu Thai	31,588	33.96%	5,699	6.13%	Move Forward	Bhumjaithai	25,889	31,588	18,153	623	10,824	570	2,637	558	0	0	0	2,167	93,009
Chiang Mai	1	Move Forward	48,823	47.73%	18,737	18.32%	Pheu Thai	United Thai Nation	48,823	30,086	387	1,019	9,772	1,514	8,471	0	0	453	0	1,768	102,293
Chiang Mai	2	Move Forward	51,181	47.38%	12,090	11.19%	Pheu Thai	United Thai Nation	51,181	39,091	579	2,695	7,371	1,290	2,204	0	0	0	0	3,606	108,017
Chiang Mai	3	Move Forward	47,469	44.34%	4,225	3.95%	Pheu Thai	United Thai Nation	47,469	43,244	3,024	1,625	5,197	772	785	0	0	573	0	4,372	107,061
Chiang Mai	4	Move Forward	62,009	57.31%	40,067	37.03%	Pheu Thai	United Thai Nation	62,009	21,942	653	1,523	15,211	1,790	1,656	0	0	632	0	2,789	108,205
Chiang Mai	5	Pheu Thai	38,015	37.86%	277	0.28%	Move Forward	United Thai Nation	37,738	38,015	668	7,858	8,239	2,259	3,209	0	0	0	0	2,422	100,408
Chiang Mai	6	Move Forward	25,828	28.56%	3,891	4.30%	Other	Pheu Thai	25,828	21,374	354	12,140	3,034	534	2,726	0	0	0	0	24,443	90,433
Chiang Mai	7	Move Forward	32,990	35.11%	3,603	3.83%	Pheu Thai	United Thai Nation	32,990	29,387	231	1,228	8,830	6,400	3,061	0	0	0	0	11,841	93,968
Chiang Mai	8	Move Forward	50,878	45.43%	15,641	13.97%	Pheu Thai	Palang Pracharath	50,878	35,237	942	15,257	4,145	626	1,622	0	0	0	0	3,293	112,000
Chiang Mai	9	Palang Pracharath	31,107	30.11%	4,075	3.94%	Pheu Thai	Move Forward	26,415	27,032	12,847	31,107	1,434	698	912	0	0	0	0	2,870	103,315
Chiang Mai	10	Pheu Thai	32,638	35.58%	3,500	3.82%	Palang Pracharath	Move Forward	20,680	32,638	516	29,138	983	2,566	913	0	0	0	0	4,286	91,720
Trang	1	United Thai Nation	25,970	26.98%	4,948	5.14%	Palang Pracharath	Bhumjaithai	17,688	3,317	19,179	21,022	25,970	7,096	342	0	0	0	0	1,653	96,267
Trang	2	Palang Pracharath	63,182	64.04%	45,944	46.57%	Democrat	Move Forward	10,553	1,510	1,231	63,182	2,802	17,238	660	0	0	0	0	1,490	98,666
Trang	3	Democrat	31,846	37.07%	15,363	17.88%	Move Forward	Palang Pracharath	16,483	5,864	2,767	14,866	9,245	31,846	579	0	0	0	0	4,264	85,914
Trang	4	Democrat	29,594	30.62%	392	0.41%	Bhumjaithai	Palang Pracharath	11,237	2,719	29,202	16,236	4,963	29,594	962	0	0	0	0	1,747	96,660
Trat	1	Move Forward	47,046	38.85%	22,080	18.24%	Pheu Thai	Palang Pracharath	47,046	24,966	8,624	19,082	11,684	7,798	472	0	0	0	0	1,410	121,082
Tak	1	Move Forward	27,664	26.71%	5,960	5.76%	Bhumjaithai	Palang Pracharath	27,664	20,798	21,704	21,013	3,644	3,962	1,820	0	0	0	0	2,951	103,556
Tak	2	Move Forward	24,133	28.18%	8,428	9.84%	Pheu Thai	Other	24,133	15,705	13,566	9,946	2,671	739	2,465	0	0	0	0	16,405	85,630
Tak	3	Palang Pracharath	31,550	35.81%	14,170	16.08%	Move Forward	Bhumjaithai	17,380	11,048	14,164	31,550	1,824	9,212	459	0	0	0	0	2,477	88,114
Nakhon Nayok	1	Pheu Thai	32,030	40.15%	6,839	8.57%	Bhumjaithai	Move Forward	13,431	32,030	25,191	421	6,654	1,313	0	0	0	0	0	745	79,785
Nakhon Nayok	2	Pheu Thai	39,496	46.95%	15,017	17.85%	Bhumjaithai	Move Forward	14,406	39,496	24,479	371	2,292	2,132	0	0	0	0	0	947	84,123
Nakhon Pathom	1	Chart Thai Pattana	39,899	39.03%	12,793	12.52%	Move Forward	United Thai Nation	27,106	7,118	96	422	25,108	659	517	39,899	0	0	0	1,291	102,216
Nakhon Pathom	2	United Thai Nation	33,770	36.04%	1,714	1.83%	Move Forward	Palang Pracharath	32,056	8,950	392	15,465	33,770	1,095	0	963	0	0	0	1,000	93,691
Nakhon Pathom	3	Chart Thai Pattana	42,825	47.08%	18,011	19.80%	Move Forward	Pheu Thai	24,814	15,920	0	1,402	3,479	527	417	42,825	0	286	0	1,290	90,960
Nakhon Pathom	4	Move Forward	24,898	24.48%	5,037	4.95%	Chart Thai Pattana	Democrat	24,898	15,305	7,780	12,999	2,547	16,281	613	19,861	0	658	0	749	101,691
Nakhon Pathom	5	Chart Thai Pattana	36,422	35.54%	11,526	11.25%	Move Forward	Bhumjaithai	24,896	8,452	24,156	510	6,357	555	0	36,422	0	387	0	738	102,473
Nakhon Pathom	6	Move Forward	38,812	42.10%	19,070	20.68%	Chart Thai Pattana	United Thai Nation	38,812	11,020	309	839	17,560	1,140	516	19,742	0	580	0	1,676	92,194
Nakhon Phanom	1	Pheu Thai	44,712	46.82%	10,735	11.24%	Bhumjaithai	Move Forward	11,637	44,712	33,977	799	482	351	2,171	0	0	0	0	1,365	95,494
Nakhon Phanom	2	Pheu Thai	39,856	41.98%	9,328	9.83%	Bhumjaithai	Move Forward	16,235	39,856	30,528	5,538	673	450	1,015	0	0	0	0	643	94,938
Nakhon Phanom	3	Bhumjaithai	41,738	44.42%	12,772	13.59%	Pheu Thai	Move Forward	16,872	28,966	41,738	1,758	574	258	1,220	0	0	0	0	2,572	93,958
Nakhon Phanom	4	Bhumjaithai	25,253	26.40%	3,595	3.76%	Pheu Thai	Thai Liberal	12,994	21,658	25,253	382	1,195	248	10,873	848	0	0	0	22,222	95,673
Nakhon Ratchasima	1	Move Forward	37,043	39.40%	7,901	8.40%	Chart Pattana	Pheu Thai	37,043	9,224	902	5,452	7,456	952	597	0	0	29,142	0	3,257	94,025
Nakhon Ratchasima	2	Move Forward	42,401	42.45%	12,339	12.35%	Chart Pattana	Palang Pracharath	42,401	8,888	591	9,849	4,345	574	638	0	0	30,062	0	2,548	99,896
Nakhon Ratchasima	3	Move Forward	38,982	39.44%	7,214	7.30%	Chart Pattana	Pheu Thai	38,982	15,853	877	881	5,359	1,398	527	0	0	31,768	0	3,192	98,837
Nakhon Ratchasima	4	Pheu Thai	37,150	38.59%	5,934	6.16%	Chart Pattana	Move Forward	19,683	37,150	3,707	704	2,416	552	194	0	0	31,216	0	645	96,267
Nakhon Ratchasima	5	Pheu Thai	46,479	48.59%	17,361	18.15%	Palang Pracharath	Move Forward	15,653	46,479	1,611	29,118	1,573	351	0	0	0	156	0	721	95,662
Nakhon Ratchasima	6	Pheu Thai	32,136	37.01%	12,964	14.93%	Palang Pracharath	Move Forward	16,857	32,136	13,126	19,172	3,287	277	483	0	0	605	0	887	86,830
Nakhon Ratchasima	7	Pheu Thai	51,348	59.00%	29,218	33.57%	Palang Pracharath	Move Forward	10,291	51,348	495	22,130	1,012	454	0	0	0	344	0	955	87,029
Nakhon Ratchasima	8	Pheu Thai	51,320	55.55%	27,742	30.03%	Palang Pracharath	Move Forward	11,795	51,320	211	23,578	2,004	2,112	0	0	0	648	0	723	92,391
Nakhon Ratchasima	9	Bhumjaithai	38,241	40.26%	13,714	14.44%	Pheu Thai	Palang Pracharath	11,666	24,527	38,241	18,070	1,486	258	0	0	0	328	0	418	94,994
Nakhon Ratchasima	10	Pheu Thai	51,206	47.02%	13,740	12.62%	Bhumjaithai	Move Forward	15,170	51,206	37,466	182	3,233	165	0	0	0	243	0	1,238	108,903
Nakhon Ratchasima	11	Pheu Thai	60,326	62.18%	39,344	40.56%	Bhumjaithai	Move Forward	12,754	60,326	20,982	345	1,151	358	0	0	0	194	0	901	97,011
Nakhon Ratchasima	12	Pheu Thai	44,072	44.52%	13,248	13.38%	Bhumjaithai	Move Forward	12,326	44,072	30,824	906	9,283	104	524	0	0	306	0	644	98,989
Nakhon Ratchasima	13	Pheu Thai	47,000	53.48%	29,602	33.68%	Move Forward	Palang Pracharath	17,398	47,000	796	16,110	3,693	389	483	0	0	293	0	1,725	87,887
Nakhon Ratchasima	14	Pheu Thai	32,596	35.96%	8,767	9.67%	Move Forward	Democrat	23,829	32,596	1,643	11,998	4,115	15,175	519	0	0	270	0	500	90,645
Nakhon Ratchasima	15	Pheu Thai	44,121	43.57%	16,206	16.00%	Bhumjaithai	Move Forward	13,329	44,121	27,915	11,382	1,991	508	0	0	0	342	0	1,676	101,264
Nakhon Ratchasima	16	Pheu Thai	37,412	40.17%	12,517	13.44%	Palang Pracharath	Move Forward	14,581	37,412	12,784	24,895	1,175	1,061	168	0	0	173	0	887	93,136
Nakhon Si Thammarat	1	Democrat	20,334	23.66%	1,459	1.70%	Move Forward	Palang Pracharath	18,875	3,509	9,237	17,304	13,139	20,334	645	0	0	1,104	0	1,790	85,937
Nakhon Si Thammarat	2	Democrat	31,617	34.64%	11,899	13.04%	Palang Pracharath	United Thai Nation	15,831	1,810	822	19,718	17,473	31,617	589	0	1,344	0	0	2,063	91,267
Nakhon Si Thammarat	3	Democrat	31,827	35.47%	10,550	11.76%	Bhumjaithai	Palang Pracharath	9,499	870	21,277	14,164	10,670	31,827	222	0	0	0	0	1,211	89,740
Nakhon Si Thammarat	4	Democrat	22,394	26.18%	4,198	4.91%	Chart Pattana	United Thai Nation	9,331	2,486	4,542	11,015	15,297	22,394	554	0	0	18,196	0	1,725	85,540
Nakhon Si Thammarat	5	Democrat	48,403	54.04%	24,576	27.44%	United Thai Nation	Move Forward	10,369	1,011	619	2,246	23,827	48,403	477	0	0	1,347	0	1,277	89,576
Nakhon Si Thammarat	6	Palang Pracharath	26,285	32.69%	3,971	4.94%	Bhumjaithai	Move Forward	10,009	5,376	22,314	26,285	6,988	5,349	509	0	0	1,609	0	1,969	80,408
Nakhon Si Thammarat	7	Bhumjaithai	27,943	32.97%	7,101	8.38%	Move Forward	United Thai Nation	20,842	3,625	27,943	984	18,877	8,879	592	0	0	0	0	3,005	84,747
Nakhon Si Thammarat	8	Bhumjaithai	23,393	28.23%	5,945	7.17%	Palang Pracharath	Move Forward	11,587	8,771	23,393	17,448	8,731	10,529	636	0	0	0	0	1,763	82,858
Nakhon Si Thammarat	9	Democrat	35,976	42.20%	9,453	11.09%	Bhumjaithai	Move Forward	11,565	1,322	26,523	1,980	6,363	35,976	299	0	0	530	0	696	85,254
Nakhon Si Thammarat	10	United Thai Nation	44,233	48.73%	26,350	29.03%	Democrat	Move Forward	10,513	7,430	2,662	3,596	44,233	17,883	632	0	0	0	0	3,823	90,772
Nakhon Sawan	1	Move Forward	31,671	31.98%	4,636	4.68%	Bhumjaithai	Pheu Thai	31,671	16,896	27,035	762	6,697	13,289	710	0	0	0	0	1,985	99,045
Nakhon Sawan	2	Pheu Thai	37,510	37.52%	12,666	12.67%	Bhumjaithai	Move Forward	18,029	37,510	24,844	13,137	3,688	609	461	0	0	0	0	1,698	99,976
Nakhon Sawan	3	United Thai Nation	32,100	31.46%	7,783	7.63%	Pheu Thai	Palang Pracharath	20,969	24,317	437	21,121	32,100	545	512	0	0	0	0	2,037	102,038
Nakhon Sawan	4	Bhumjaithai	32,934	33.75%	7,861	8.06%	Pheu Thai	Palang Pracharath	16,051	25,073	32,934	20,932	1,481	345	260	0	0	0	0	495	97,571
Nakhon Sawan	5	Bhumjaithai	46,438	47.16%	29,086	29.54%	Move Forward	Pheu Thai	17,352	16,873	46,438	12,577	2,911	456	158	0	0	0	0	1,711	98,476
Nakhon Sawan	6	Chart Pattana	24,089	26.33%	1,661	1.82%	United Thai Nation	Bhumjaithai	11,408	14,663	16,847	315	22,428	414	249	0	0	24,089	0	1,087	91,500
Nonthaburi	1	Move Forward	45,615	45.30%	17,449	17.33%	United Thai Nation	Pheu Thai	45,615	20,640	1,037	842	28,166	1,473	1,462	0	0	0	0	1,463	100,698
Nonthaburi	2	Move Forward	39,086	43.43%	14,007	15.56%	United Thai Nation	Pheu Thai	39,086	19,423	0	666	25,079	1,520	2,473	0	0	0	0	1,759	90,006
Nonthaburi	3	Move Forward	44,369	44.23%	18,743	18.68%	United Thai Nation	Pheu Thai	44,369	17,148	774	3,361	25,626	1,636	5,334	0	0	0	0	2,064	100,312
Nonthaburi	4	Move Forward	36,249	39.70%	10,807	11.83%	United Thai Nation	Pheu Thai	36,249	24,446	749	611	25,442	1,395	850	0	0	0	0	1,575	91,317
Nonthaburi	5	Move Forward	48,055	50.91%	28,158	29.83%	Pheu Thai	United Thai Nation	48,055	19,897	2,145	4,618	14,684	3,469	0	0	0	0	0	1,525	94,393
Nonthaburi	6	Move Forward	48,169	47.71%	23,917	23.69%	United Thai Nation	Pheu Thai	48,169	23,508	590	1,557	24,252	1,454	0	0	0	0	0	1,428	100,958
Nonthaburi	7	Move Forward	41,356	41.38%	25,258	25.27%	Pheu Thai	Bhumjaithai	41,356	16,098	12,854	5,567	10,679	11,299	0	0	0	880	0	1,211	99,944
Nonthaburi	8	Move Forward	41,734	43.37%	17,399	18.08%	Pheu Thai	Bhumjaithai	41,734	24,335	14,090	469	11,475	1,868	1,049	0	0	0	0	1,201	96,221
Narathiwat	1	United Thai Nation	29,006	32.15%	2,636	2.92%	Bhumjaithai	Prachachat	8,299	802	26,370	6,371	29,006	1,134	564	0	17,413	0	0	266	90,225
Narathiwat	2	Palang Pracharath	31,289	42.18%	13,842	18.66%	Democrat	Prachachat	0	2,355	188	31,289	10,645	17,447	0	0	11,835	0	0	429	74,188
Narathiwat	3	Palang Pracharath	34,411	47.78%	4,460	6.19%	Prachachat	United Thai Nation	0	1,001	745	34,411	4,075	912	0	0	29,951	0	0	927	72,022
Narathiwat	4	Bhumjaithai	30,966	39.57%	3,800	4.86%	Prachachat	Palang Pracharath	3,622	517	30,966	13,288	591	1,343	565	0	27,166	0	0	199	78,257
Narathiwat	5	Prachachat	31,457	35.55%	9,548	10.79%	Bhumjaithai	Palang Pracharath	3,312	1,412	21,909	16,595	12,455	765	368	0	31,457	0	0	213	88,486
Nan	1	Pheu Thai	35,314	34.35%	1,226	1.19%	Move Forward	Palang Pracharath	34,088	35,314	825	22,043	5,586	1,497	1,408	0	0	0	0	2,054	102,815
Nan	2	Pheu Thai	56,746	59.43%	33,912	35.52%	Move Forward	United Thai Nation	22,834	56,746	813	3,147	9,806	1,184	0	0	0	0	0	953	95,483
Nan	3	Pheu Thai	29,379	34.70%	2,758	3.26%	Move Forward	Palang Pracharath	26,621	29,379	750	22,896	2,192	880	949	0	0	0	0	1,008	84,675
Bueng Kan	1	Bhumjaithai	25,295	35.01%	288	0.40%	Pheu Thai	Move Forward	17,325	25,007	25,295	746	666	291	2,239	0	0	0	0	672	72,241
Bueng Kan	2	Bhumjaithai	26,541	36.33%	7,828	10.72%	Pheu Thai	Move Forward	16,568	18,713	26,541	6,350	773	130	2,068	0	0	0	0	1,909	73,052
Bueng Kan	3	Pheu Thai	30,277	40.16%	8,753	11.61%	Move Forward	Bhumjaithai	21,524	30,277	19,239	160	1,219	377	1,445	0	0	0	0	1,153	75,394
Buriram	1	Bhumjaithai	36,739	43.89%	8,434	10.08%	Move Forward	Pheu Thai	28,305	11,039	36,739	3,298	1,847	652	469	0	0	0	0	1,359	83,708
Buriram	2	Bhumjaithai	46,729	56.79%	29,989	36.45%	Move Forward	Pheu Thai	16,740	10,813	46,729	3,955	1,324	420	440	0	0	0	0	1,863	82,284
Buriram	3	Bhumjaithai	38,468	49.28%	18,451	23.64%	Move Forward	Pheu Thai	20,017	15,313	38,468	797	1,410	276	537	0	0	0	0	1,243	78,061
Buriram	4	Bhumjaithai	37,706	48.93%	13,652	17.72%	Pheu Thai	Move Forward	11,965	24,054	37,706	1,210	1,007	427	216	0	0	0	0	474	77,059
Buriram	5	Bhumjaithai	47,746	56.62%	30,602	36.29%	Pheu Thai	Move Forward	14,179	17,144	47,746	832	1,209	1,731	977	0	0	0	0	504	84,322
Buriram	6	Bhumjaithai	35,362	43.33%	15,178	18.60%	Pheu Thai	Move Forward	17,371	20,184	35,362	2,647	2,490	866	979	0	0	0	0	1,713	81,612
Buriram	7	Bhumjaithai	28,685	35.03%	215	0.26%	Pheu Thai	Move Forward	18,535	28,470	28,685	762	1,138	831	724	0	0	0	0	2,737	81,882
Buriram	8	Bhumjaithai	34,429	39.97%	11,281	13.10%	Move Forward	Pheu Thai	23,148	16,660	34,429	8,327	1,197	643	466	0	0	0	0	1,269	86,139
Buriram	9	Bhumjaithai	45,059	54.28%	20,377	24.54%	Pheu Thai	Move Forward	9,682	24,682	45,059	591	839	406	370	0	0	0	0	1,390	83,019
Buriram	10	Bhumjaithai	39,006	50.66%	22,776	29.58%	Move Forward	Pheu Thai	16,230	15,879	39,006	450	3,094	882	650	0	0	0	0	808	76,999
Pathum Thani	1	Move Forward	29,272	28.29%	1,833	1.77%	Pheu Thai	Bhumjaithai	29,272	27,439	22,297	17,361	4,343	751	692	0	0	0	0	1,308	103,463
Pathum Thani	2	Move Forward	40,215	39.29%	3,204	3.13%	Pheu Thai	Palang Pracharath	40,215	37,011	1,233	11,187	9,178	1,558	0	0	0	0	0	1,962	102,344
Pathum Thani	3	Move Forward	43,096	45.23%	17,477	18.34%	Pheu Thai	Bhumjaithai	43,096	25,619	15,570	2,332	5,410	1,082	846	0	0	0	0	1,333	95,288
Pathum Thani	4	Move Forward	41,705	41.34%	17,186	17.04%	Pheu Thai	Bhumjaithai	41,705	24,519	21,716	1,620	7,895	1,296	564	0	0	0	0	1,556	100,871
Pathum Thani	5	Pheu Thai	35,078	31.80%	1,193	1.08%	Bhumjaithai	Move Forward	32,541	35,078	33,885	989	5,390	859	0	0	0	0	0	1,581	110,323
Pathum Thani	6	Move Forward	48,900	45.37%	26,537	24.62%	Pheu Thai	Palang Pracharath	48,900	22,363	1,455	16,651	12,846	1,021	805	1,639	0	0	0	2,091	107,771
Pathum Thani	7	Move Forward	36,227	33.75%	5,955	5.55%	Bhumjaithai	Pheu Thai	36,227	29,997	30,272	1,005	7,111	650	489	0	0	0	0	1,592	107,343
Prachuap Khiri Khan	1	Bhumjaithai	36,719	34.04%	2,233	2.07%	Democrat	Move Forward	18,047	7,982	36,719	6,040	3,338	34,486	336	0	0	0	0	936	107,884
Prachuap Khiri Khan	2	Democrat	42,736	41.02%	16,539	15.87%	Pheu Thai	Move Forward	20,797	26,197	217	7,894	4,726	42,736	618	0	0	0	0	1,008	104,193
Prachuap Khiri Khan	3	Democrat	23,215	23.90%	5,001	5.15%	United Thai Nation	Palang Pracharath	17,491	4,769	14,119	17,601	18,214	23,215	0	0	0	0	0	1,707	97,116
Prachinburi	1	Bhumjaithai	35,641	37.33%	4,444	4.66%	Move Forward	Pheu Thai	31,197	13,455	35,641	8,167	4,296	636	911	0	0	0	0	1,162	95,465
Prachinburi	2	Move Forward	35,451	33.99%	4,257	4.08%	Bhumjaithai	Pheu Thai	35,451	29,332	31,194	867	4,004	1,662	791	0	0	0	0	1,007	104,308
Prachinburi	3	Bhumjaithai	30,833	32.47%	3,506	3.69%	Move Forward	Pheu Thai	27,327	18,490	30,833	389	15,609	766	339	0	0	0	0	1,213	94,966
Pattani	1	Prachachat	14,452	20.55%	1,682	2.39%	Bhumjaithai	Palang Pracharath	10,132	1,333	12,770	12,363	3,370	12,328	249	0	14,452	0	0	3,321	70,318
Pattani	2	Palang Pracharath	23,483	29.38%	8,650	10.82%	Bhumjaithai	Prachachat	5,979	728	14,833	23,483	11,122	6,679	349	0	13,268	0	0	3,495	79,936
Pattani	3	Prachachat	23,636	34.91%	3,342	4.94%	Palang Pracharath	Democrat	4,546	551	794	20,294	812	12,478	603	0	23,636	0	0	3,993	67,707
Pattani	4	Democrat	21,556	26.88%	2,196	2.74%	United Thai Nation	Bhumjaithai	4,558	641	14,095	1,595	19,360	21,556	126	0	13,895	0	0	4,355	80,181
Pattani	5	Prachachat	37,068	49.76%	10,524	14.13%	Palang Pracharath	Move Forward	4,539	771	939	26,544	681	365	0	0	37,068	0	0	3,588	74,495
Phra Nakhon Si Ayutthaya	1	Move Forward	41,081	39.95%	5,405	5.26%	Bhumjaithai	Pheu Thai	41,081	15,289	35,676	1,250	6,677	1,014	621	0	0	0	0	1,213	102,821
Phra Nakhon Si Ayutthaya	2	Move Forward	27,467	27.41%	663	0.66%	Bhumjaithai	Palang Pracharath	27,467	14,855	26,804	24,683	4,370	793	0	0	0	0	0	1,254	100,226
Phra Nakhon Si Ayutthaya	3	Bhumjaithai	47,117	45.89%	12,533	12.21%	Move Forward	Pheu Thai	34,584	13,061	47,117	2,120	3,374	433	290	0	0	0	0	1,694	102,673
Phra Nakhon Si Ayutthaya	4	Bhumjaithai	50,080	45.90%	19,007	17.42%	Move Forward	Pheu Thai	31,073	23,229	50,080	414	2,939	355	0	0	0	0	0	1,017	109,107
Phra Nakhon Si Ayutthaya	5	Bhumjaithai	37,275	36.72%	7,155	7.05%	Pheu Thai	Move Forward	22,100	30,120	37,275	209	8,786	836	341	601	0	0	0	1,243	101,511
Phayao	1	Palang Pracharath	53,963	57.31%	26,101	27.72%	Move Forward	Pheu Thai	27,862	8,804	458	53,963	1,881	718	0	0	0	0	0	473	94,159
Phayao	2	Palang Pracharath	32,779	35.83%	2,374	2.59%	Pheu Thai	Move Forward	25,904	30,405	447	32,779	1,249	574	0	0	0	0	0	136	91,494
Phayao	3	Palang Pracharath	34,720	36.30%	11,096	11.60%	Pheu Thai	United Thai Nation	16,921	23,624	441	34,720	17,982	429	666	0	0	0	0	860	95,643
Phang Nga	1	Bhumjaithai	34,457	47.45%	18,607	25.62%	Democrat	Move Forward	10,284	2,594	34,457	1,137	6,194	15,850	548	0	0	0	0	1,552	72,616
Phang Nga	2	Palang Pracharath	21,506	28.49%	109	0.14%	Pheu Thai	Bhumjaithai	0	21,397	14,065	21,506	7,598	7,466	1,542	0	0	0	0	1,919	75,493
Phatthalung	1	Democrat	49,471	45.56%	11,339	10.44%	Bhumjaithai	Move Forward	9,539	823	38,132	6,917	2,658	49,471	194	0	0	0	0	839	108,573
Phatthalung	2	United Thai Nation	41,201	35.39%	1,620	1.39%	Bhumjaithai	Democrat	10,342	1,993	39,581	9,196	41,201	10,442	703	0	0	2,453	0	523	116,434
Phatthalung	3	Democrat	47,848	44.84%	16,683	15.64%	Bhumjaithai	Move Forward	13,742	2,695	31,165	3,233	5,691	47,848	1,328	0	0	0	0	997	106,699
Phichit	1	Bhumjaithai	43,965	42.98%	21,980	21.49%	Pheu Thai	Move Forward	18,133	21,985	43,965	12,282	3,517	1,412	454	0	0	0	0	549	102,297
Phichit	2	Bhumjaithai	33,390	35.60%	12,744	13.59%	Pheu Thai	Move Forward	14,756	20,646	33,390	5,429	3,955	14,682	0	0	0	0	0	947	93,805
Phichit	3	Bhumjaithai	33,996	34.16%	9,175	9.22%	United Thai Nation	Pheu Thai	14,358	14,603	33,996	10,075	24,821	482	0	0	0	0	0	1,185	99,520
Phitsanulok	1	Move Forward	40,842	41.35%	21,746	22.02%	Palang Pracharath	Pheu Thai	40,842	18,180	2,478	19,096	10,229	3,979	804	0	0	0	0	3,155	98,763
Phitsanulok	2	Pheu Thai	30,819	29.06%	7,303	6.89%	Move Forward	Bhumjaithai	23,516	30,819	17,843	17,777	12,765	977	621	0	0	0	0	1,739	106,057
Phitsanulok	3	United Thai Nation	22,765	24.34%	796	0.85%	Pheu Thai	Bhumjaithai	18,331	21,969	18,460	9,200	22,765	938	485	0	0	0	0	1,391	93,539
Phitsanulok	4	Pheu Thai	40,236	43.67%	7,418	8.05%	Bhumjaithai	Move Forward	14,556	40,236	32,818	438	2,076	543	358	0	0	0	0	1,111	92,136
Phitsanulok	5	Move Forward	25,792	27.92%	8,949	9.69%	Palang Pracharath	United Thai Nation	25,792	12,409	11,871	16,843	14,908	383	7,693	0	0	0	0	2,472	92,371
Phetchaburi	1	United Thai Nation	40,235	40.38%	14,535	14.59%	Chart Thai Pattana	Move Forward	14,184	3,978	10,250	265	40,235	4,478	0	25,700	0	0	0	562	99,652
Phetchaburi	2	Bhumjaithai	44,482	41.24%	10,581	9.81%	United Thai Nation	Move Forward	14,735	4,089	44,482	295	33,901	9,287	0	0	0	0	0	1,064	107,853
Phetchaburi	3	United Thai Nation	48,107	46.20%	22,869	21.96%	Bhumjaithai	Move Forward	15,095	5,273	25,238	1,488	48,107	8,130	0	0	0	0	0	807	104,138
Phetchabun	1	Palang Pracharath	35,905	40.27%	11,355	12.74%	Move Forward	Pheu Thai	24,550	20,609	414	35,905	3,379	654	304	3,100	0	0	0	241	89,156
Phetchabun	2	Palang Pracharath	38,352	41.83%	9,495	10.35%	Pheu Thai	Move Forward	17,655	28,857	1,087	38,352	3,733	539	465	0	0	0	0	1,008	91,696
Phetchabun	3	Palang Pracharath	31,707	35.09%	5,602	6.20%	Democrat	Move Forward	17,663	9,801	217	31,707	3,047	26,105	375	0	0	0	0	1,450	90,365
Phetchabun	4	Palang Pracharath	41,039	51.06%	18,440	22.94%	Pheu Thai	Move Forward	13,176	22,599	281	41,039	1,324	530	321	0	0	0	0	1,102	80,372
Phetchabun	5	Palang Pracharath	34,971	41.52%	10,408	12.36%	Pheu Thai	Move Forward	20,365	24,563	300	34,971	2,515	555	433	0	0	0	0	519	84,221
Phetchabun	6	Palang Pracharath	47,118	53.75%	28,237	32.21%	Move Forward	Pheu Thai	18,881	16,356	469	47,118	2,007	847	448	0	0	120	0	1,422	87,668
Phrae	1	Pheu Thai	41,563	43.04%	17,540	18.16%	United Thai Nation	Move Forward	21,703	41,563	389	6,867	24,023	319	0	0	0	0	0	1,713	96,577
Phrae	2	Pheu Thai	32,845	37.31%	3,782	4.30%	United Thai Nation	Move Forward	19,097	32,845	3,354	2,353	29,063	294	0	0	0	0	0	1,021	88,027
Phrae	3	Pheu Thai	33,616	39.10%	11,835	13.77%	Move Forward	Palang Pracharath	21,781	33,616	9,910	14,168	4,918	290	0	0	0	0	0	1,284	85,967
Phuket	1	Move Forward	21,252	30.05%	4,769	6.74%	United Thai Nation	Palang Pracharath	21,252	3,802	7,790	10,639	16,483	8,802	306	0	0	0	0	1,659	70,733
Phuket	2	Move Forward	21,913	31.23%	6,946	9.90%	United Thai Nation	Bhumjaithai	21,913	5,976	9,596	662	14,967	8,686	345	0	0	7,540	0	491	70,176
Phuket	3	Move Forward	20,421	26.09%	3,952	5.05%	Chart Pattana	Bhumjaithai	20,421	3,459	13,692	3,480	9,650	8,995	1,086	0	0	16,469	0	1,030	78,282
Maha Sarakham	1	Pheu Thai	30,859	33.55%	4,635	5.04%	Move Forward	Palang Pracharath	26,224	30,859	2,449	20,479	3,256	1,130	4,678	474	0	418	0	2,005	91,972
Maha Sarakham	2	Pheu Thai	34,062	39.74%	4,724	5.51%	Palang Pracharath	Move Forward	17,631	34,062	606	29,338	1,116	208	208	70	0	0	0	2,468	85,707
Maha Sarakham	3	Bhumjaithai	44,122	49.95%	10,376	11.75%	Pheu Thai	Move Forward	7,606	33,746	44,122	851	661	46	174	41	0	147	0	931	88,325
Maha Sarakham	4	Pheu Thai	38,744	45.21%	7,463	8.71%	Bhumjaithai	Move Forward	10,588	38,744	31,281	909	1,542	454	341	401	0	0	0	1,441	85,701
Maha Sarakham	5	Pheu Thai	45,087	48.99%	23,708	25.76%	Palang Pracharath	Move Forward	18,570	45,087	228	21,379	3,234	1,086	417	94	0	0	0	1,934	92,029
Maha Sarakham	6	Pheu Thai	46,765	49.90%	19,685	21.01%	Bhumjaithai	Move Forward	15,932	46,765	27,080	1,320	1,056	181	492	85	0	0	0	802	93,713
Mukdahan	1	Palang Pracharath	33,514	33.23%	5,063	5.02%	Move Forward	Pheu Thai	28,451	26,406	1,332	33,514	1,573	640	6,106	0	0	0	0	2,820	100,842
Mukdahan	2	Move Forward	28,555	29.24%	4,791	4.91%	Pheu Thai	Palang Pracharath	28,555	23,764	13,727	18,572	1,668	1,532	4,838	0	0	0	0	5,005	97,661
Mae Hong Son	1	Palang Pracharath	18,772	28.54%	4,896	7.44%	Move Forward	Democrat	13,876	4,957	6,485	18,772	7,510	12,460	0	754	0	0	0	960	65,774
Mae Hong Son	2	Democrat	20,346	29.09%	2,810	4.02%	Pheu Thai	Palang Pracharath	11,596	17,536	476	14,753	1,858	20,346	590	0	0	0	0	2,778	69,933
Yasothon	1	Thai Sang Thai	53,130	49.98%	27,916	26.26%	Chart Thai Pattana	Pheu Thai	11,714	13,394	595	956	0	145	53,130	25,214	0	0	0	1,145	106,293
Yasothon	2	Pheu Thai	44,851	47.50%	10,270	10.88%	Thai Sang Thai	Move Forward	9,541	44,851	1,435	388	1,097	277	34,581	0	0	0	0	2,248	94,418
Yasothon	3	Bhumjaithai	38,074	37.96%	12,869	12.83%	Pheu Thai	Move Forward	14,564	25,205	38,074	4,963	632	498	1,498	13,622	0	0	0	1,242	100,298
Yala	1	Prachachat	23,682	25.83%	3,231	3.52%	Palang Pracharath	Democrat	14,871	1,707	737	20,451	7,367	17,378	406	0	23,682	0	0	5,073	91,672
Yala	2	Prachachat	51,946	55.65%	27,335	29.28%	Palang Pracharath	Move Forward	6,540	876	2,527	24,611	1,040	1,758	504	0	51,946	0	0	3,547	93,349
Yala	3	Prachachat	31,741	34.91%	6,856	7.54%	Palang Pracharath	Move Forward	16,575	2,659	616	24,885	6,270	5,286	401	0	31,741	0	0	2,480	90,913
Roi Et	1	Chart Thai Pattana	40,436	43.08%	8,118	8.65%	Pheu Thai	Move Forward	16,306	32,318	205	1,029	1,087	528	376	40,436	0	436	0	1,149	93,870
Roi Et	2	Pheu Thai	33,466	36.27%	5,989	6.49%	Move Forward	Palang Pracharath	27,477	33,466	811	26,568	884	522	770	0	0	0	0	1,777	92,275
Roi Et	3	Palang Pracharath	39,181	44.77%	8,088	9.24%	Pheu Thai	Move Forward	13,005	31,093	255	39,181	605	345	623	0	0	0	0	2,406	87,513
Roi Et	4	Pheu Thai	36,822	44.30%	10,969	13.20%	Palang Pracharath	Move Forward	15,691	36,822	1,106	25,853	0	443	1,376	0	0	0	0	1,836	83,127
Roi Et	5	Pheu Thai	61,288	72.95%	46,087	54.86%	Move Forward	United Thai Nation	15,201	61,288	1,615	841	2,910	510	531	0	0	0	0	1,117	84,013
Roi Et	6	Pheu Thai	36,878	43.66%	20,572	24.36%	Bhumjaithai	Move Forward	12,838	36,878	16,306	4,358	1,322	357	10,603	0	0	0	0	1,798	84,460
Roi Et	7	Thai Sang Thai	42,492	47.52%	21,536	24.08%	Pheu Thai	Move Forward	11,980	20,956	6,502	3,753	540	211	42,492	1,300	0	0	0	1,694	89,428
Roi Et	8	Pheu Thai	47,305	52.27%	26,477	29.26%	Thai Sang Thai	Move Forward	15,533	47,305	2,337	627	1,117	751	20,828	0	0	0	0	2,001	90,499
Ranong	1	Bhumjaithai	44,717	44.98%	21,864	21.99%	United Thai Nation	Move Forward	13,568	2,297	44,717	12,940	22,853	1,803	640	0	0	0	0	589	99,407
Rayong	1	Move Forward	37,820	42.84%	19,991	22.64%	Democrat	United Thai Nation	37,820	13,590	1,313	312	16,204	17,829	548	0	0	0	0	665	88,281
Rayong	2	Move Forward	38,813	48.96%	15,515	19.57%	Democrat	Pheu Thai	38,813	8,221	0	491	5,249	23,298	1,650	0	0	0	0	1,559	79,281
Rayong	3	Move Forward	29,034	32.45%	7,308	8.17%	Palang Pracharath	Democrat	29,034	11,647	1,004	21,726	3,608	14,668	492	0	0	3,772	0	3,519	89,470
Rayong	4	Move Forward	38,707	44.86%	11,652	13.51%	Democrat	Pheu Thai	38,707	13,425	0	755	3,554	27,055	1,383	0	0	0	0	1,399	86,278
Rayong	5	Move Forward	34,713	40.32%	15,631	18.16%	Democrat	United Thai Nation	34,713	13,210	0	452	16,130	19,082	1,147	0	0	0	0	1,356	86,090
Ratchaburi	1	United Thai Nation	52,941	51.94%	23,295	22.85%	Move Forward	Pheu Thai	29,646	14,372	1,403	649	52,941	1,446	0	0	0	364	0	1,114	101,935
Ratchaburi	2	Palang Pracharath	41,807	43.55%	14,404	15.01%	Move Forward	Pheu Thai	27,403	13,778	1,430	41,807	6,496	2,035	0	0	0	0	0	3,044	95,993
Ratchaburi	3	Palang Pracharath	49,262	43.90%	23,148	20.63%	Bhumjaithai	Move Forward	20,781	7,848	26,114	49,262	5,357	1,288	0	0	0	0	0	1,569	112,219
Ratchaburi	4	United Thai Nation	54,815	49.43%	32,726	29.51%	Democrat	Move Forward	19,982	12,129	413	551	54,815	22,089	227	0	0	105	0	592	110,903
Ratchaburi	5	Palang Pracharath	44,253	40.23%	5,969	5.43%	Bhumjaithai	Move Forward	17,095	6,179	38,284	44,253	2,298	783	143	0	0	223	0	747	110,005
Lopburi	1	Pheu Thai	28,405	32.60%	2,996	3.44%	Move Forward	United Thai Nation	25,409	28,405	290	10,884	13,317	6,147	720	0	0	0	0	1,954	87,126
Lopburi	2	Move Forward	26,330	29.95%	3,290	3.74%	United Thai Nation	Pheu Thai	26,330	16,943	16,385	1,687	23,040	896	0	0	0	0	0	2,641	87,922
Lopburi	3	Bhumjaithai	43,330	47.46%	13,207	14.47%	Pheu Thai	Move Forward	13,256	30,123	43,330	589	2,102	419	0	0	0	0	0	1,479	91,298
Lopburi	4	Bhumjaithai	41,413	49.78%	22,992	27.64%	Move Forward	Pheu Thai	18,421	18,326	41,413	664	1,992	450	0	0	0	0	0	1,927	83,193
Lopburi	5	Pheu Thai	41,827	48.93%	17,438	20.40%	Bhumjaithai	Move Forward	9,634	41,827	24,389	6,690	1,119	263	557	0	0	0	0	1,009	85,488
Lampang	1	Move Forward	51,579	46.08%	16,832	15.04%	Pheu Thai	Palang Pracharath	51,579	34,747	3,994	8,808	7,207	1,361	1,126	0	0	571	0	2,552	111,945
Lampang	2	Pheu Thai	41,114	37.51%	5,630	5.14%	Move Forward	Palang Pracharath	35,484	41,114	714	16,919	3,591	1,037	8,151	0	0	704	0	1,908	109,622
Lampang	3	Move Forward	41,651	37.42%	12,895	11.58%	Pheu Thai	Palang Pracharath	41,651	28,756	1,865	27,786	5,403	817	1,188	0	0	786	0	3,059	111,311
Lampang	4	Move Forward	47,027	41.61%	19,065	16.87%	Pheu Thai	Palang Pracharath	47,027	27,962	2,731	15,672	14,884	1,224	404	0	0	0	0	3,122	113,026
Lamphun	1	Move Forward	60,127	43.71%	31,799	23.11%	Pheu Thai	Other	60,127	28,328	887	16,233	3,404	6,033	4,072	0	0	0	0	18,485	137,569
Lamphun	2	Pheu Thai	47,050	35.81%	3,784	2.88%	Move Forward	Palang Pracharath	43,266	47,050	1,078	29,174	3,070	3,162	1,007	0	0	0	0	3,568	131,375
Loei	1	Pheu Thai	49,831	55.39%	25,629	28.49%	Move Forward	United Thai Nation	24,202	49,831	2,981	2,541	6,024	915	563	0	0	0	0	2,903	89,960
Loei	2	Pheu Thai	50,421	57.99%	29,977	34.48%	Move Forward	United Thai Nation	20,444	50,421	193	2,463	7,908	267	1,676	0	0	0	0	3,573	86,945
Loei	3	Bhumjaithai	44,272	47.51%	24,310	26.09%	Move Forward	Pheu Thai	19,962	19,838	44,272	3,893	1,765	640	896	0	0	0	0	1,924	93,190
Loei	4	Pheu Thai	45,638	52.03%	23,952	27.31%	Move Forward	Palang Pracharath	21,686	45,638	2,868	9,500	2,259	1,437	2,975	0	0	0	0	1,348	87,711
Sisaket	1	Pheu Thai	42,445	44.41%	6,505	6.81%	Bhumjaithai	Move Forward	14,003	42,445	35,940	288	1,099	665	0	0	0	0	0	1,128	95,568
Sisaket	2	Pheu Thai	42,475	51.70%	17,654	21.49%	Move Forward	Thai Sang Thai	24,821	42,475	336	1,152	2,409	615	6,370	0	0	0	0	3,979	82,157
Sisaket	3	Bhumjaithai	37,934	44.97%	5,772	6.84%	Pheu Thai	Move Forward	10,288	32,162	37,934	969	904	550	337	0	0	0	0	1,219	84,363
Sisaket	4	Pheu Thai	38,410	47.31%	9,679	11.92%	Bhumjaithai	Move Forward	9,744	38,410	28,731	1,848	857	641	294	0	0	0	0	665	81,190
Sisaket	5	Pheu Thai	32,884	40.38%	7,047	8.65%	Bhumjaithai	Move Forward	18,978	32,884	25,837	394	1,450	322	0	0	0	0	0	1,568	81,433
Sisaket	6	Pheu Thai	35,379	42.57%	11,806	14.21%	Palang Pracharath	Move Forward	18,239	35,379	2,277	23,573	1,686	666	0	0	0	0	0	1,285	83,105
Sisaket	7	Pheu Thai	52,952	65.49%	34,999	43.28%	Move Forward	Palang Pracharath	17,953	52,952	1,443	6,219	0	446	468	0	0	0	0	1,379	80,860
Sisaket	8	Bhumjaithai	42,882	46.18%	8,071	8.69%	Pheu Thai	Move Forward	8,158	34,811	42,882	4,971	379	230	0	0	0	0	0	1,429	92,860
Sisaket	9	Pheu Thai	38,051	41.00%	7,414	7.99%	Bhumjaithai	Move Forward	19,086	38,051	30,637	1,475	1,066	804	492	0	0	0	0	1,207	92,818
Sakon Nakhon	1	Pheu Thai	29,716	32.77%	2,223	2.45%	Move Forward	Thai Sang Thai	27,493	29,716	753	484	3,195	1,687	25,403	0	0	161	0	1,790	90,682
Sakon Nakhon	2	Democrat	27,406	31.47%	706	0.81%	Pheu Thai	Move Forward	21,317	26,700	1,960	863	3,570	27,406	1,426	0	0	0	0	3,835	87,077
Sakon Nakhon	3	Pheu Thai	49,346	55.88%	36,609	41.45%	Move Forward	Palang Pracharath	12,737	49,346	438	11,738	862	11,723	309	0	0	0	0	1,159	88,312
Sakon Nakhon	4	Pheu Thai	35,690	42.41%	14,743	17.52%	Move Forward	Democrat	20,947	35,690	1,465	1,311	5,312	15,745	911	0	0	468	0	2,308	84,157
Sakon Nakhon	5	Palang Pracharath	29,085	35.60%	3,112	3.81%	Pheu Thai	Move Forward	19,980	25,973	282	29,085	997	221	2,879	0	0	0	0	2,285	81,702
Sakon Nakhon	6	Pheu Thai	39,035	48.71%	17,529	21.87%	Move Forward	Democrat	21,506	39,035	1,066	722	1,202	12,956	1,376	0	0	0	0	2,280	80,143
Sakon Nakhon	7	Pheu Thai	32,195	40.63%	5,015	6.33%	Move Forward	Bhumjaithai	27,180	32,195	11,579	2,934	1,563	475	1,071	0	0	0	0	2,236	79,233
Songkhla	1	Democrat	40,521	42.21%	21,409	22.30%	Move Forward	United Thai Nation	19,112	1,467	12,573	2,026	17,509	40,521	233	0	0	2,058	0	494	95,993
Songkhla	2	United Thai Nation	20,553	24.97%	168	0.20%	Move Forward	Chart Pattana	20,385	2,155	7,432	6,209	20,553	9,573	228	0	0	15,368	0	413	82,316
Songkhla	3	Democrat	39,577	39.15%	18,874	18.67%	Bhumjaithai	Move Forward	19,885	2,050	20,703	625	13,247	39,577	692	0	0	3,115	0	1,198	101,092
Songkhla	4	Palang Pracharath	35,289	36.52%	1,253	1.30%	Democrat	United Thai Nation	8,526	798	6,068	35,289	10,857	34,036	525	0	0	0	0	520	96,619
Songkhla	5	Democrat	54,343	58.94%	40,113	43.51%	Move Forward	United Thai Nation	14,230	3,200	1,619	6,698	9,804	54,343	611	0	0	0	0	1,691	92,196
Songkhla	6	Democrat	34,835	39.60%	1,187	1.35%	Palang Pracharath	Move Forward	12,719	1,108	0	33,648	4,462	34,835	368	0	0	0	0	831	87,971
Songkhla	7	Bhumjaithai	31,926	35.35%	3,203	3.55%	Democrat	Palang Pracharath	0	4,604	31,926	20,983	1,513	28,723	0	0	0	0	0	2,577	90,326
Songkhla	8	Democrat	42,932	47.47%	17,557	19.41%	Bhumjaithai	Move Forward	8,016	5,165	25,375	1,791	4,270	42,932	1,074	0	0	0	0	1,821	90,444
Songkhla	9	Democrat	38,200	38.04%	11,335	11.29%	Bhumjaithai	Move Forward	19,729	2,217	26,865	2,245	6,843	38,200	209	0	0	2,803	0	1,319	100,430
Satun	1	Bhumjaithai	36,810	45.28%	23,123	28.44%	Democrat	Move Forward	12,950	8,148	36,810	1,657	5,249	13,687	715	0	0	863	0	1,218	81,297
Satun	2	Bhumjaithai	55,621	55.75%	35,664	35.75%	Palang Pracharath	Move Forward	11,863	6,059	55,621	19,957	2,174	1,883	479	0	0	409	0	1,316	99,761
Samut Prakan	1	Move Forward	46,383	48.77%	24,923	26.20%	Palang Pracharath	Pheu Thai	46,383	13,889	160	21,460	9,612	1,140	478	0	0	491	0	1,497	95,110
Samut Prakan	2	Move Forward	43,435	45.76%	18,710	19.71%	Palang Pracharath	Pheu Thai	43,435	18,029	128	24,725	5,389	828	687	0	0	0	0	1,705	94,926
Samut Prakan	3	Move Forward	50,177	49.63%	32,693	32.33%	Pheu Thai	Palang Pracharath	50,177	17,484	302	17,067	12,131	1,343	733	0	0	0	0	1,871	101,108
Samut Prakan	4	Move Forward	49,043	50.72%	30,005	31.03%	United Thai Nation	Pheu Thai	49,043	13,098	418	11,930	19,038	1,210	774	0	0	0	0	1,189	96,700
Samut Prakan	5	Move Forward	60,282	52.70%	37,777	33.03%	Pheu Thai	Palang Pracharath	60,282	22,505	394	19,474	7,555	1,568	912	0	0	0	0	1,696	114,386
Samut Prakan	6	Move Forward	37,730	39.03%	16,821	17.40%	Palang Pracharath	Pheu Thai	37,730	18,457	233	20,909	16,670	742	548	0	0	656	0	727	96,672
Samut Prakan	7	Move Forward	39,151	35.84%	11,696	10.71%	United Thai Nation	Pheu Thai	39,151	20,638	251	19,838	27,455	369	483	0	0	335	0	712	109,232
Samut Prakan	8	Move Forward	46,539	43.29%	21,725	20.21%	Pheu Thai	Palang Pracharath	46,539	24,814	197	24,764	5,451	1,540	1,427	0	0	0	0	2,779	107,511
Samut Songkhram	1	Move Forward	42,882	37.76%	20,929	18.43%	United Thai Nation	Democrat	42,882	14,082	532	15,716	21,953	16,353	733	0	0	0	0	1,323	113,574
Samut Sakhon	1	Move Forward	45,550	41.08%	15,660	14.12%	Palang Pracharath	Pheu Thai	45,550	16,604	575	29,890	9,180	6,850	764	0	0	0	0	1,456	110,869
Samut Sakhon	2	Move Forward	46,897	43.83%	24,527	22.92%	Pheu Thai	United Thai Nation	46,897	22,370	1,335	15,257	15,718	3,274	502	0	0	0	0	1,643	106,996
Samut Sakhon	3	Move Forward	37,511	33.31%	7,525	6.68%	Bhumjaithai	Palang Pracharath	37,511	13,008	29,986	20,527	6,697	2,113	1,748	0	0	0	0	1,033	112,623
Sa Kaeo	1	Palang Pracharath	42,183	41.67%	18,265	18.04%	Move Forward	Bhumjaithai	23,918	12,217	20,570	42,183	1,123	779	0	0	0	0	0	432	101,222
Sa Kaeo	2	Palang Pracharath	47,173	48.35%	19,640	20.13%	Move Forward	Pheu Thai	27,533	16,943	2,568	47,173	1,619	262	0	0	0	0	0	1,472	97,570
Sa Kaeo	3	Pheu Thai	54,116	52.32%	30,000	29.01%	Palang Pracharath	Move Forward	20,828	54,116	0	24,116	2,620	935	0	0	0	0	0	811	103,426
Saraburi	1	Move Forward	32,444	33.56%	3,370	3.49%	Pheu Thai	United Thai Nation	32,444	29,074	339	9,744	13,450	9,777	0	0	0	0	0	1,844	96,672
Saraburi	2	Pheu Thai	38,203	37.19%	5,791	5.64%	United Thai Nation	Move Forward	29,164	38,203	517	460	32,412	986	0	0	0	0	0	992	102,734
Saraburi	3	Bhumjaithai	45,424	46.47%	18,300	18.72%	Move Forward	Pheu Thai	27,124	12,758	45,424	7,431	2,542	2,050	0	0	0	0	0	419	97,748
Saraburi	4	Palang Pracharath	29,676	30.65%	2,867	2.96%	Move Forward	Pheu Thai	26,809	23,180	361	29,676	13,878	1,419	0	0	0	0	0	1,494	96,817
Sing Buri	1	Palang Pracharath	42,292	34.81%	3,002	2.47%	Move Forward	Pheu Thai	39,290	29,193	693	42,292	5,047	626	2,317	0	0	0	0	2,020	121,478
Sukhothai	1	Pheu Thai	32,130	39.01%	6,013	7.30%	Move Forward	United Thai Nation	26,117	32,130	310	290	19,230	1,732	263	0	0	0	0	2,301	82,373
Sukhothai	2	Pheu Thai	31,314	39.94%	11,533	14.71%	Move Forward	Democrat	19,781	31,314	5,498	511	2,005	17,924	398	0	0	0	0	975	78,406
Sukhothai	3	Pheu Thai	33,260	38.67%	8,278	9.62%	Bhumjaithai	Palang Pracharath	11,647	33,260	24,982	13,570	1,381	578	432	0	0	0	0	167	86,017
Sukhothai	4	Pheu Thai	36,738	44.23%	18,226	21.94%	Move Forward	Bhumjaithai	18,512	36,738	16,797	223	3,140	1,837	0	0	0	230	0	5,579	83,056
Suphan Buri	1	Chart Thai Pattana	46,324	50.49%	19,773	21.55%	Move Forward	Pheu Thai	26,551	13,641	816	740	0	975	1,312	46,324	0	0	0	1,391	91,750
Suphan Buri	2	Chart Thai Pattana	43,795	48.83%	19,224	21.43%	Move Forward	Pheu Thai	24,571	7,741	563	1,023	1,788	1,985	6,995	43,795	0	0	0	1,225	89,686
Suphan Buri	3	Chart Thai Pattana	39,348	40.53%	6,358	6.55%	Democrat	Move Forward	14,774	7,423	345	303	1,073	32,990	484	39,348	0	0	0	334	97,074
Suphan Buri	4	Chart Thai Pattana	42,639	42.06%	22,239	21.93%	Palang Pracharath	Pheu Thai	17,088	17,876	463	20,400	1,120	577	505	42,639	0	0	0	720	101,388
Suphan Buri	5	Chart Thai Pattana	55,877	53.48%	31,566	30.21%	Move Forward	Pheu Thai	24,311	14,543	219	903	1,600	5,358	333	55,877	0	0	0	1,329	104,473
Surat Thani	1	United Thai Nation	27,978	33.83%	4,947	5.98%	Move Forward	Bhumjaithai	23,031	3,345	13,775	1,405	27,978	9,963	492	0	0	1,427	0	1,285	82,701
Surat Thani	2	United Thai Nation	24,625	30.78%	3,247	4.06%	Palang Pracharath	Move Forward	14,768	7,477	3,174	21,378	24,625	5,369	2,097	0	0	801	0	320	80,009
Surat Thani	3	United Thai Nation	46,456	53.79%	28,673	33.20%	Democrat	Move Forward	13,167	5,732	248	634	46,456	17,783	1,070	0	0	0	0	1,281	86,371
Surat Thani	4	United Thai Nation	26,043	31.83%	4,207	5.14%	Democrat	Move Forward	17,036	8,238	4,049	503	26,043	21,836	916	0	0	1,076	0	2,117	81,814
Surat Thani	5	United Thai Nation	25,520	32.25%	5,666	7.16%	Move Forward	Democrat	19,854	9,072	3,014	1,282	25,520	13,667	3,164	0	0	737	0	2,826	79,136
Surat Thani	6	Bhumjaithai	43,112	47.38%	16,311	17.93%	United Thai Nation	Move Forward	12,311	2,834	43,112	696	26,801	3,608	637	0	0	0	0	992	90,991
Surat Thani	7	United Thai Nation	30,359	36.35%	10,140	12.14%	Move Forward	Democrat	20,219	3,023	915	5,950	30,359	14,668	788	0	5,197	0	0	2,405	83,524
Surin	1	Bhumjaithai	36,305	38.37%	10,258	10.84%	Move Forward	Pheu Thai	26,047	24,094	36,305	1,410	2,690	1,547	419	0	0	0	0	2,100	94,612
Surin	2	Pheu Thai	39,570	41.25%	4,045	4.22%	Bhumjaithai	Move Forward	15,086	39,570	35,525	1,690	1,347	399	0	0	0	0	0	2,305	95,922
Surin	3	Bhumjaithai	44,534	49.57%	20,192	22.48%	Pheu Thai	Move Forward	16,307	24,342	44,534	1,154	937	465	749	0	0	0	0	1,345	89,833
Surin	4	Pheu Thai	35,198	39.95%	11,795	13.39%	Move Forward	United Thai Nation	23,403	35,198	7,218	2,980	15,001	940	817	0	0	0	0	2,553	88,110
Surin	5	Pheu Thai	36,021	42.84%	17,449	20.75%	Move Forward	Thai Sang Thai	18,572	36,021	1,451	5,105	1,623	402	18,503	0	0	0	0	2,410	84,087
Surin	6	Bhumjaithai	38,611	46.20%	10,331	12.36%	Pheu Thai	Move Forward	13,621	28,280	38,611	917	0	239	581	0	0	0	0	1,329	83,578
Surin	7	Bhumjaithai	42,050	45.96%	19,156	20.94%	Pheu Thai	Move Forward	19,089	22,894	42,050	2,659	2,036	504	469	0	0	0	0	1,798	91,499
Surin	8	Bhumjaithai	39,558	46.69%	16,069	18.97%	Pheu Thai	Move Forward	17,521	23,489	39,558	0	1,349	669	858	0	0	0	0	1,276	84,720
Nong Khai	1	Palang Pracharath	33,078	36.10%	7,295	7.96%	Pheu Thai	Move Forward	23,909	25,783	2,930	33,078	1,469	614	1,854	0	0	0	0	1,989	91,626
Nong Khai	2	Pheu Thai	33,527	40.84%	7,077	8.62%	Bhumjaithai	Move Forward	17,000	33,527	26,450	509	1,111	370	1,714	0	0	0	0	1,403	82,084
Nong Khai	3	Pheu Thai	32,539	37.25%	7,630	8.74%	Move Forward	Palang Pracharath	24,909	32,539	880	23,806	1,132	310	748	0	0	0	0	3,021	87,345
Nong Bua Lamphu	1	Pheu Thai	26,309	29.14%	932	1.03%	Palang Pracharath	Move Forward	21,795	26,309	7,551	25,377	2,243	536	4,890	0	0	0	0	1,583	90,284
Nong Bua Lamphu	2	Pheu Thai	32,247	37.80%	10,586	12.41%	Thai Sang Thai	Move Forward	17,344	32,247	308	7,030	1,982	421	21,661	0	0	0	0	4,323	85,316
Nong Bua Lamphu	3	Pheu Thai	32,375	38.99%	11,629	14.00%	Thai Sang Thai	Move Forward	14,575	32,375	1,883	10,002	1,237	521	20,746	0	0	0	0	1,704	83,043
Ang Thong	1	Bhumjaithai	44,780	52.93%	23,894	28.25%	Pheu Thai	Move Forward	15,614	20,886	44,780	618	1,602	482	0	0	0	0	0	613	84,595
Ang Thong	2	Bhumjaithai	47,887	55.59%	25,816	29.97%	Pheu Thai	Move Forward	12,501	22,071	47,887	816	1,417	709	0	0	0	0	0	743	86,144
Amnat Charoen	1	Bhumjaithai	38,275	37.92%	16,887	16.73%	Pheu Thai	Move Forward	16,724	21,388	38,275	2,825	2,701	15,926	1,281	0	0	459	0	1,367	100,946
Amnat Charoen	2	Bhumjaithai	46,881	43.86%	27,693	25.91%	Move Forward	Pheu Thai	19,188	17,637	46,881	16,009	1,156	2,530	2,027	0	0	0	0	1,460	106,888
Udon Thani	1	Move Forward	32,476	37.90%	5,300	6.18%	Pheu Thai	Palang Pracharath	32,476	27,176	437	16,111	5,748	843	689	0	0	687	0	1,525	85,692
Udon Thani	2	Pheu Thai	40,220	47.19%	13,731	16.11%	Move Forward	United Thai Nation	26,489	40,220	1,412	4,004	5,984	510	2,443	0	0	300	0	3,864	85,226
Udon Thani	3	Thai Sang Thai	36,250	46.05%	16,002	20.33%	Pheu Thai	Move Forward	17,654	20,248	465	807	827	326	36,250	0	0	0	0	2,137	78,714
Udon Thani	4	Pheu Thai	21,475	27.72%	2,445	3.16%	Thai Sang Thai	Thai Liberal	8,603	21,475	224	7,560	745	209	19,030	0	0	0	0	19,616	77,462
Udon Thani	5	Pheu Thai	37,890	50.99%	15,331	20.63%	Move Forward	Thai Sang Thai	22,559	37,890	736	1,779	2,064	289	6,838	0	0	0	0	2,160	74,315
Udon Thani	6	Thai Sang Thai	27,751	34.10%	4,866	5.98%	Pheu Thai	Move Forward	22,150	22,885	266	4,362	1,036	204	27,751	0	0	771	0	1,958	81,383
Udon Thani	7	Pheu Thai	33,928	42.28%	985	1.23%	Move Forward	United Thai Nation	32,943	33,928	3,178	2,573	3,643	418	356	0	0	659	0	2,546	80,244
Udon Thani	8	Pheu Thai	33,537	42.78%	9,519	12.14%	Move Forward	Palang Pracharath	24,018	33,537	622	10,126	2,174	550	3,544	0	0	0	0	3,821	78,392
Udon Thani	9	Pheu Thai	43,529	53.59%	21,863	26.92%	Move Forward	Palang Pracharath	21,666	43,529	542	7,401	1,911	488	1,835	0	0	0	0	3,854	81,226
Udon Thani	10	Pheu Thai	47,763	60.76%	26,970	34.31%	Move Forward	Thai Sang Thai	20,793	47,763	0	1,661	1,551	582	3,441	0	0	0	0	2,813	78,604
Uttaradit	1	Pheu Thai	32,820	38.60%	7,124	8.38%	Bhumjaithai	Move Forward	19,857	32,820	25,696	362	4,089	820	717	0	0	0	0	665	85,026
Uttaradit	2	Pheu Thai	36,183	43.78%	15,231	18.43%	Move Forward	United Thai Nation	20,952	36,183	503	846	20,714	1,087	460	0	0	0	0	1,911	82,656
Uttaradit	3	Pheu Thai	48,779	56.61%	30,273	35.13%	Move Forward	United Thai Nation	18,506	48,779	824	1,284	12,896	1,543	1,150	0	0	0	0	1,180	86,162
Uthai Thani	1	Bhumjaithai	49,525	58.38%	33,693	39.72%	Move Forward	Pheu Thai	15,832	11,272	49,525	511	5,153	1,333	712	0	0	0	0	490	84,828
Uthai Thani	2	Bhumjaithai	43,505	50.13%	24,815	28.59%	Pheu Thai	Move Forward	18,435	18,690	43,505	613	3,304	1,528	245	0	0	0	0	471	86,791
Ubon Ratchathani	1	Pheu Thai	32,468	32.79%	1,356	1.37%	Move Forward	Thai Sang Thai	31,112	32,468	307	1,340	9,086	943	21,579	0	0	303	0	1,885	99,023
Ubon Ratchathani	2	Democrat	38,164	41.33%	6,211	6.73%	Pheu Thai	Move Forward	17,520	31,953	787	1,829	0	38,164	0	0	0	0	0	2,093	92,346
Ubon Ratchathani	3	Thai Ruam Palang	31,218	31.35%	9,198	9.24%	Pheu Thai	Bhumjaithai	8,140	22,020	16,572	12,423	730	6,888	0	0	0	0	31,218	1,583	99,574
Ubon Ratchathani	4	Pheu Thai	39,462	39.24%	8,410	8.36%	Move Forward	Bhumjaithai	31,052	39,462	19,511	2,847	0	755	670	4,013	0	0	0	2,265	100,575
Ubon Ratchathani	5	Bhumjaithai	44,121	49.13%	13,525	15.06%	Pheu Thai	Move Forward	12,050	30,596	44,121	452	779	359	0	0	0	0	0	1,441	89,798
Ubon Ratchathani	6	Pheu Thai	43,430	51.20%	20,671	24.37%	Thai Sang Thai	Move Forward	9,177	43,430	4,023	611	1,049	2,504	22,759	0	0	0	0	1,272	84,825
Ubon Ratchathani	7	Pheu Thai	38,533	43.55%	5,034	5.69%	Bhumjaithai	Move Forward	10,300	38,533	33,499	404	2,962	262	403	0	0	0	0	2,110	88,473
Ubon Ratchathani	8	Bhumjaithai	31,773	34.51%	3,880	4.21%	Pheu Thai	Move Forward	14,621	27,893	31,773	12,037	1,230	644	1,145	0	0	0	0	2,713	92,056
Ubon Ratchathani	9	Thai Sang Thai	31,311	38.25%	460	0.56%	Pheu Thai	Move Forward	12,105	30,851	1,528	961	1,613	480	31,311	0	0	0	0	3,000	81,849
Ubon Ratchathani	10	Thai Ruam Palang	63,127	64.79%	43,776	44.93%	Pheu Thai	Move Forward	9,735	19,351	1,177	816	973	331	0	0	0	0	63,127	1,918	97,428
Ubon Ratchathani	11	Bhumjaithai	43,797	48.69%	19,509	21.69%	Pheu Thai	Move Forward	13,063	24,288	43,797	580	946	513	4,833	0	0	0	0	1,933	89,953
