= Results of the 2026 Thai general election =

28th General Election in Thailand

The 2026 Thai general election was held in Thailand on 8 February 2026 to elect 500 members of the House of Representatives. 400 members were elected from each electoral district by first-past-the-post voting, and 100 members were elected from a party list. 251 seats were required for control of the House of Representatives.

== Parties ==
BJT	Bhumjaithai Party
PPRP	Palang Pracharath Party
MFP	Move Forward Party
PPLE	People's Party
PT	Pheu Thai Party
KT	Kla Tham Party
Dem	Democrat Party
UTN	United Thai Nation Party
TST	Thai Sang Thai Party
PCC	Prachachat Party
TRP	Thai Ruam Palang Party

== Party list result ==
100 members of the House of Representatives from 17 parties were elected from party lists, determined by Hare-Niemeyer method.

Party	Votes	%	Seats
People's Party	11,043,309	30.56	32
Bhumjaithai Party	6,468,073	17.90	19
Pheu Thai Party	5,575,456	15.43	16
Democrat Party	3,941,928	10.91	11
Economic Party	1,133,055	3.14	3
United Thai Nation Party	766,078	2.12	2
Pheu Chart Thai Party	680,256	1.88	2
Kla Tham Party	648,662	1.79	2
Ruam Jai Thai Party	435,225	1.20	1
Prachachat Party	428,848	1.19	1
New Party	314,430	0.87	1
Thai Sup Thawee Party	305,565	0.85	1
New Democracy Party	256,221	0.71	1
New Dimension Party	247,365	0.68	1
Thai Pakdee Party	246,823	0.68	1
Thai Sang Thai Party	202,626	0.56	1
United People's Power Party	197,510	0.55	1
Thai Liberal Party	185,705	0.51	1
New Alternative Party (Thailand)	171,061	0.47	1
Thai Ruam Palang Party	166,723	0.46	1
Palang Pracharath Party	141,082	0.39	1
Other	2,582,701	7.15	0
Total	36,138,702	100.00	100
Source: Election Commission

=== Incumbent Status ===
Last incumbent	Party when elected	Party in this election	Status
Sirikanya Tansakun	MFP	PPLE	✓ Incumbent re-elected.
Sia Champatong	MFP	PPLE	✓ Incumbent re-elected.
Apisit Laisuttuklai	MFP	Mov	Incumbent lost reelection.
Wirot Lakkanaadisorn	MFP	PPLE	Incumbent lost reelection.
Rangsiman Rome	MFP	PPLE	✓ Incumbent re-elected.
Sittipon Wibultanakun	MFP	PPLE	✓ Incumbent re-elected.
Surachet Pravinvongvuth	MFP	PPLE	✓ Incumbent re-elected.
Parit Watcharasin	MFP	PPLE	✓ Incumbent re-elected.
Natthawut Buaprathum	MFP	PPLE	✓ Incumbent re-elected.
Natthaphong Ruengpanyawut	MFP	PPLE	✓ Incumbent re-elected.
Chaiwat Sathavorawijit	MFP	PPLE	✓ Incumbent re-elected.
Tunyawat Kamolwongwat	MFP	PPLE	Incumbent retiring.
Wayo Assawarungruang	MFP	PPLE	✓ Incumbent re-elected.
Prasertpong Soornnuvatara	MFP	PPLE	Incumbent lost reelection in Krabi 3.
Manop Keereepuwadol	MFP	PPLE	Incumbent retiring.
Romadon Panjor	MFP	PPLE	✓ Incumbent re-elected.
Karunpon Thiensuwan	MFP	PPLE	Incumbent lost reelection.
Pakornwut Udompipatkul	MFP	PPLE	✓ Incumbent re-elected.
Poonsak Chanchampa	MFP	PPLE	✓ Incumbent re-elected.
Supachot Chaiyasat	MFP	PPLE	Incumbent retiring.
Saniwan Buaban	MFP	PPLE	Incumbent lost reelection.
Nitipon Piwmow	MFP	PPLE	Incumbent lost reelection.
Paramee Waijongcharoen	MFP	PPLE	Incumbent lost reelection.
Woraporn Wiriyaroj	MFP	PPLE	Incumbent lost reelection.
Surawat Thongbu	MFP	PPLE	Incumbent retiring.
Khamphong Thephakham	MFP	PPLE	Incumbent lost reelection.
Khamphong Thephakham	MFP	PPLE	Incumbent retiring.
Wanvipa Maison	MFP	PPLE	Incumbent retiring.
Laofang Banthitterdsakun	MFP	PPLE	✓ Incumbent re-elected.
Ongkan Chaiyabut	MFP	PPLE	Incumbent retiring.
Chutima Kotchapan	MFP	PPLE	Incumbent lost reelection.
Chunlapong Yuket	MFP	PPLE	Incumbent retiring.
Kanlayapat Rajitroj	MFP	PPLE	Incumbent retiring.
Narongdej Ularakun	MFP	PPLE	Incumbent lost reelection.
Pakamon Noonanan	MFP	PPLE	✓ Incumbent re-elected.
Chusak Sirinin	PT	PT	✓ Incumbent re-elected.
Krieng Kalptinan	PT	PT	Incumbent retiring.
Sutin Khungsang	PT	PT	✓ Incumbent re-elected.
Visuth Chainaroon	PT	PT	✓ Incumbent re-elected.
Chaturon Chaisang	PT	PT	✓ Incumbent re-elected.
Pairoj Lohsoontorn	PT	PT	✓ Incumbent re-elected.
Prayut Siripanich	PT	PT	✓ Incumbent re-elected.
Adisorn Piangket	PT	PT	✓ Incumbent re-elected.
Nikom Boonwiset	PT	PT	Incumbent lost reelection.
Khattiya Sawadipon	PT	PT	Incumbent lost reelection.
Praweenut Intapanya	PT	PT	Incumbent retiring.
Surakiat Thientong	PT	PT	Incumbent lost reelection.
Jittipoj Wiriyaroj	PT	PT	Incumbent lost reelection.
Danuporn Poonnakan	PT	PT	Incumbent lost reelection.
Anusorn Eiamsa-ard	PT	PT	Incumbent lost reelection.
Sutham Sangprathum	PT	PT	Incumbent retiring.
Sriyada Palimaphan	PT	PT	Incumbent lost reelection.
Penchisa Hongupathamchai	PT	PT	Incumbent did not seek reelection.
La-ong Tiyapairat	PT	PT	Incumbent lost reelection.
Cherdchai Tantisirin	PT	PT	Incumbent lost reelection.
Kokaew Pikunthong	PT	PT	Incumbent lost reelection.
Khachit Chainikhom	PT	NDP	Incumbent retiring.
Ekphon Raksuksuk	PT	PT	Incumbent lost reelection.
Thanusak Lekuthai	PT	PT	Incumbent lost reelection.
Thanapong Thanadechakul	PT	PT	Incumbent retiring.
Rungruang Pittayasiri	PT	PCC	Incumbent lost reelection
Waraporn Tangpakorn	PT	PT	Incumbent retiring.
Surasit Nithiwutthiwarak	PT	BJT	Incumbent lost reelection in Chonburi 6
Somchai Asawachaisophon	PT	PT	Incumbent retiring.
Ekanat Promphan	UTN	BJT	✓ Incumbent re-elected.
Pitcharat Laohaphongchana	UTN	BJT	✓ Incumbent re-elected.
Wittaya Kaewparadai	UTN	UTN	Incumbent lost reelection.
Chatchawan Kongudom	UTN	UTN	✓ Incumbent re-elected.
Juti Krairiksh	UTN	BJT	✓ Incumbent re-elected in Phitsanulok 5.
Kriengyot Sudlapa	UTN	BJT	✓ Incumbent re-elected.
Duangrit Benjathikun Chairungruang	UTN	BJT	Incumbernt retired.
Chaiwat Paopiumsub	UTN	KT	✓ Incumbent re-elected in Chachoengsao 3.
Anucha Burapachaisri	UTN	BJT	Incumbent lost reelection.
Siriwan Prasatthasut	UTN	BJT	Incumbent lost reelection.
Kecha Saksomboon	UTN	PT	Incumbent lost reelection.
Thipanan Sirichana	UTN	UTN	Incumbent retiring.
Aswin Kwanmuang	UTN	Dem	Incumbent lost reelection.
Anutin Charnvirakul	BJT	BJT	✓ Incumbent re-elected.
Chalat Ratchakitprakarn	BJT	BJT	✓ Incumbent re-elected.
Nandana Songpracha	BJT	BJT	✓ Incumbent re-elected.
Jurin Laksanawisit	Dem	Dem	Incumbent lost reelection.
Chuan Leekpai	Dem	Dem	✓ Incumbent re-elected.
Banyat Bantadtan	Dem	Dem	Incumbent retiring.
Wan Muhamad Noor Matha	PCC	PCC	Incumbent lost reelection
Tawee Sodsong	PCC	PCC	✓ Incumbent re-elected.
Prawit Wongsuwon	PPRP	PPRP	Incumbent retiring.
Mangkorn Yontrakul	TLP	PT	Incumbent lost reelection.
Takorn Tantasith	TST	KT	Incumbent retiring.
Surathin Phichan	NDP	NDP	✓ Incumbent re-elected.
Varawut Silpa-archa	CTP	BJT	✓ Incumbent re-elected.
Aran Panthumchinda	CPK	CPP	Incumbent retiring.
Kanvee Suebsaeng	Fair	Mov	Incumbent lost reelection.
Kriditaj Sangthanyothin	New	KT	Incumbent lost reelection.
Chaowarit Khajohnpongkirati	NSPP	KT	Incumbent lost reelection.
Bancha Dejcharoensirikul	PTC	PTC	Incumbent lost reelection.
Preeda Boonplerng	TTPP	TTPP	Incumbent lost reelection.

=== Constituency incumbent running as party list candidate ===
Last incumbent	Party when elected	Party in this election	Status
Khajit Chainikom	PT	PT	Incumbent lost reelection.
La-ong Tiyapairach	PT	PT	Incumbent lost reelection.
Pairoat Lohsoonthorn	PT	PT	✓ Incumbent re-elected.
Prasert Jantararuangtong	PT	PT	✓ Incumbent re-elected.
Visarn Techateerawat	PT	PT	Incumbent lost reelection.
Visuth Chainaroon	PT	PT	✓ Incumbent re-elected.
Weerawat Osathanukroh	PT	PT	Incumbent lost reelection.
Wisit Techateerawat	PT	PT	Incumbent lost reelection.
Sompong Amornvivat	PT	PT	✓ Incumbent re-elected.
Sutin Khungsang	PT	PT	✓ Incumbent re-elected.
Anudith Nakornthap	PT	TST	Incumbent lost reelection.
Atirat Ratanasate	PPRP	PPRP	Incumbent lost reelection.
Nipan Siritorn	PPRP	PPRP	Incumbent lost reelection.
Panya Jeenakum	PPRP	PPRP	Incumbent lost reelection.
Suchart Tonjaroen	PPRP	PT	✓ Incumbent re-elected.
Rukchanok Srinork	MFP	PPLE	✓ Incumbent re-elected.
Nattacha Boonchaiinsawat	MFP	PPLE	✓ Incumbent re-elected.
Piyarat Chongthep	MFP	PPLE	✓ Incumbent re-elected.
Chonthicha Jaengraew	MFP	PPLE	Incumbent lost reelection.
Chaiyampawan Manpianchit	MFP	KT	Incumbent lost reelection.
Chaichanok Chidchob	BJT	BJT	✓ Incumbent re-elected.
Surasak Phancharoenworakul	BJT	BJT	Incumbent lost reelection.
Pakorn Mungcharoenporn	BJT	BJT	Incumbent lost reelection.
Romtham Khamnurak	BJT	BJT	✓ Incumbent re-elected.
Thamanat Prompow	PPRP	KT	✓ Incumbent re-elected.

=== Newly elected candidates ===
Candidate	Party	Status
Veerayuth Kanchuchat	PPLE	✓ Elected.
Itsariya Pairiphairit	PPLE	✓ Elected.
Nattaya Boonphakdee	PPLE	✓ Elected.
Pawut Pongwitthayaphanu	PPLE	✓ Elected.
Teera Sutheewarangkoon	PPLE	✓ Elected.
Kittipong Piyawanno	PPLE	✓ Elected.
Wisut Tantinan	PPLE	✓ Elected.
Natcha Boonchaiinsawas	PPLE	✓ Elected.
Pramual Suthecharuwat	PPLE	✓ Elected.
Kittichai Techakulwanich	PPLE	✓ Elected.
Phakamon Nunanan	PPLE	✓ Elected.
Sorasak Somrakraisornkit	PPLE	✓ Elected.
Ekkapop Sittiwanthana	PPLE	✓ Elected.
Theerasak Chiratrachoo	PPLE	✓ Elected.
Thanaporn Wijan	PPLE	✓ Elected.
Santi Promphat	BJT	✓ Elected.
Sabida Thaiseth	BJT	✓ Elected.
Suphamas Isaraprakdee	BJT	✓ Elected.
Traisuli Traisaranakul	BJT	✓ Elected.
Kritsada Leenawarat	BJT	✓ Elected.
Sasithorn Kittithornkul	BJT	✓ Elected.
Supachai Jaisamut	BJT	✓ Elected.
Padimchai Sasomsap	BJT	✓ Elected.
Thanakorn Wangboonkhongchana	BJT	✓ Elected.
Rinlita Adisa	BJT	✓ Elected.
Yodchanan Wongsawat	PT	✓ Elected.
Chulaphan Amornvivat	PT	✓ Elected.
Suriya Juangroongruangkit	PT	✓ Elected.
Wisut Chainanun	PT	✓ Elected.
Suchart Thadathamarongvej	PT	✓ Elected.
Sudawan Wangsuphakitkosol	PT	✓ Elected.
Thongtham Wechachai	PT	✓ Elected.
Natthida Thepsuthin	PT	✓ Elected.
Abhisit Vejjajiva	Dem	✓ Elected.
Korn Chatikavanij	Dem	✓ Elected.
Kardee Leowpairoj	Dem	✓ Elected.
Chaiwut Bannawat	Dem	✓ Elected.
Amporn Pinasasa	Dem	✓ Elected.
Sathit Wongnongteuy	Dem	✓ Elected.
Chaichana Detdecho	Dem	✓ Elected.
Sakoltee Phatthiyakul	Dem	✓ Elected.
Ratklao Intawong Suwannakiri	Dem	✓ Elected.
Isra Sunthornwat	Dem	✓ Elected.
Chris Potranandana	Eco	✓ Elected.
Peerapol Kanokwalai	Eco	✓ Elected.
Angsana Niamwanichkul	Eco	✓ Elected.
Pirapan Salirathavibhaga	UTN	✓ Elected.
Pongthawat Techadechruangkul	PCT	✓ Elected.
Achinathirat Chatthaweeworachai	PCT	✓ Elected.
Narumon Pinyosinwat	KT	✓ Elected.
Boonrawee Yomchinda	RJT	✓ Elected.
Nawinda Sawaddetdee	New	✓ Elected.
Taweesap Tatsamai	TSTP	✓ Elected.
Preecha Khaikaew	NDiP	✓ Elected.
Warong Dechkitwikrom	TPP	✓ Elected.
Udomdech Rattanathien	TST	✓ Elected.
Apiwit Thiparat	UPPP	✓ Elected.
Sereepisuth Temeeyaves	TLP	✓ Elected.
Rachen Trakulwiang	NAP	✓ Elected.
Wasawath Puangphonsri	TRP	✓ Elected.
Pakorn Thianchai	PPRP	✓ Elected.

== Constituency results ==
There are 400 constituencies in this election. They were elected by first-past-the-post voting.

Region	District	Last incumbent	Party when elected	Party in this election	Status	Elected candidate	Party
BANGKOK METROPOLITAN	Bangkok 1	Paramait Vithayaruksun	MFP	PPLE	Incumbent re-elected	Paramait Vithayaruksun	PPLE
BANGKOK METROPOLITAN	Bangkok 2	Tisana Choonhavan	MFP	PPLE	Incumbent retiring.	Seksit Yaemsanguansak	PPLE
BANGKOK METROPOLITAN	Bangkok 3	Chorayuth Chaturapornprasit	MFP	PPLE	Incumbent re-elected.	Chorayuth Chaturapornprasit	PPLE
BANGKOK METROPOLITAN	Bangkok 4	Bhuntin Noumjerm	MFP	PPLE	Incumbent re-elected.	Bhuntin Noumjerm	PPLE
BANGKOK METROPOLITAN	Bangkok 5	Chalermchai Kulalert	MFP	PPLE	Incumbent retiring.	Pitikorn Bunpaesat	PPLE
BANGKOK METROPOLITAN	Bangkok 6	Kantapon Duangamporn	MFP	PPLE	Incumbent re-elected.	Kantapon Duangamporn	PPLE
BANGKOK METROPOLITAN	Bangkok 7	Patsarin Ramwong	MFP	PPLE	Incumbent re-elected.	Patsarin Ramwong	PPLE
BANGKOK METROPOLITAN	Bangkok 8	Chayaphon Satondee	MFP	PPLE	Incumbent re-elected.	Chayaphon Satondee	PPLE
BANGKOK METROPOLITAN	Bangkok 9	Suphanat Minchainant	MFP	PPLE	Incumbent re-elected.	Suphanat Minchainant	PPLE
BANGKOK METROPOLITAN	Bangkok 10	Ekkarach Udomumnuay	MFP	PPLE	Incumbent re-elected.	Ekkarach Udomumnuay	PPLE
BANGKOK METROPOLITAN	Bangkok 11	Sasinan Thamnithinan	MFP	PPLE	Incumbent re-elected.	Sasinan Thamnithinan	PPLE
BANGKOK METROPOLITAN	Bangkok 12	Puriwat Chaisamran	MFP	PPLE	Incumbent re-elected.	Puriwat Chaisamran	PPLE
BANGKOK METROPOLITAN	Bangkok 13	Tanadej Pengsuk	MFP	PPLE	Incumbent re-elected.	Tanadej Pengsuk	PPLE
BANGKOK METROPOLITAN	Bangkok 14	Sirilapat Kongtrakarn	MFP	PPLE	Incumbent re-elected.	Korkiat Korsoongsak	PPLE
BANGKOK METROPOLITAN	Bangkok 15	Vittawat Tichawanich	MFP	PPLE	Incumbent re-elected.	Vittawat Tichawanich	PPLE
BANGKOK METROPOLITAN	Bangkok 16	Pimkarn Kiratiwirapakorn	MFP	PPLE	Incumbent re-elected.	Pimkarn Kiratiwirapakorn	PPLE
BANGKOK METROPOLITAN	Bangkok 17	Weerawut Rukthieng	MFP	PPLE	Incumbent re-elected.	Weerawut Rukthieng	PPLE
BANGKOK METROPOLITAN	Bangkok 18	Teerajchai Phunthumas	MFP	PPLE	Incumbent re-elected.	Teerajchai Phunthumas	PPLE
BANGKOK METROPOLITAN	Bangkok 19	Kanphong Prayoonsak	MFP	PPLE	Incumbent re-elected.	Kanphong Prayoonsak	PPLE
BANGKOK METROPOLITAN	Bangkok 20	Theerarat Samrejvanich	PT	PT	Incumbent lost reelection.	Chumphon Lakkham	PPLE
BANGKOK METROPOLITAN	Bangkok 21	Nuttapong Premphunsawad	MFP	PPLE	Incumbent re-elected.	Nuttapong Premphunsawad	PPLE
BANGKOK METROPOLITAN	Bangkok 22	Supakon Tangtiphaiboontana	MFP	PPLE	Incumbent re-elected.	Supakon Tangtiphaiboontana	PPLE
BANGKOK METROPOLITAN	Bangkok 23	Piyarat Chongthep	MFP	PPLE	Incumbent retiring.	Chonlathan Supphaiboonlerd	PPLE
BANGKOK METROPOLITAN	Bangkok 24	Taopiphop Limjittrakorn	MFP	PPLE	Incumbent re-elected in district 33.	Napat Jittapinankanta	PPLE
BANGKOK METROPOLITAN	Bangkok 25	Annsiri Walaikanok	MFP	PPLE	Incumbent re-elected.	Annsiri Walaikanok	PPLE
BANGKOK METROPOLITAN	Bangkok 26	Chaiyamparwaan Manpianjit	MFP	KT	Incumbent running as party list candidate.	Pongsoranat Thonglee	PPLE
BANGKOK METROPOLITAN	Bangkok 27	Nattacha Boonchaiinsawat	MFP	PPLE	Incumbent running as party list candidate.	Narupol Lertpanyaroj	PPLE
BANGKOK METROPOLITAN	Bangkok 28	Rukchanok Srinork	MFP	PPLE	Incumbent running as party list candidate.	Chonlanat Koykun	PPLE
BANGKOK METROPOLITAN	Bangkok 29	Tisarat Laohapon	MFP	PPLE	Incumbent re-elected.	Tisarat Laohapon	PPLE
BANGKOK METROPOLITAN	Bangkok 30	Thanyathorn Dhaninwattanathorn	MFP	PPLE	Incumbent re-elected.	Thanyathorn Dhaninwattanathorn	PPLE
BANGKOK METROPOLITAN	Bangkok 31	Sirin Sanguansin	MFP	PPLE	Incumbent re-elected.	Anusorn Thamjai	PPLE
BANGKOK METROPOLITAN	Bangkok 32	Pavitra Jittakit	MFP	PPLE	Incumbent re-elected.	Pavitra Jittakit	PPLE
BANGKOK METROPOLITAN	Bangkok 33	Pongpan Yodmuangjaroen	MFP	PPLE	Incumbent retiring.	Taopiphop Limjittrakorn	PPLE
BANGKOK METROPOLITAN	Nakhon Pathom 1	Supachok Srisukajon	CT	BJT	Incumbent re-elected.	Supachok Srisukajon	BJT
BANGKOK METROPOLITAN	Nakhon Pathom 2	Sinthop Kaewpijit	UTN	KT	Incumbent re-elected.	Sinthop Kaewpijit	KT
BANGKOK METROPOLITAN	Nakhon Pathom 3	Panuwat Sasomsub	CT	BJT	Incumbent re-elected.	Panuwat Sasomsub	BJT
BANGKOK METROPOLITAN	Nakhon Pathom 4	Kittipon Panprommat	MFP	PPLE	Incumbent lost reelection.	Sukchart Sasomsap	BJT
BANGKOK METROPOLITAN	Nakhon Pathom 5	Anucha Sasomsub	CT	BJT	Incumbent re-elected.	Anucha Sasomsub	BJT
BANGKOK METROPOLITAN	Nakhon Pathom 6	Chitsanupong Tangmetakun	MFP	PPLE	Incumbent lost reelection.	Chonpruksak Wongarunniyom	PPLE
BANGKOK METROPOLITAN	Nonthaburi 1	Surapan Waiyakorn	MFP	Mov	Incumbent lost reelection.	Wuttakorn Nutayakun	PPLE
BANGKOK METROPOLITAN	Nonthaburi 2	Panyarat Nantaphusitanon	MFP	PPLE	Incumbent re-elected.	Panyarat Nantaphusitanon	PPLE
BANGKOK METROPOLITAN	Nonthaburi 3	Anusorn Kaewwichain	MFP	PPLE	Incumbent re-elected.	Anusorn Kaewwichain	PPLE
BANGKOK METROPOLITAN	Nonthaburi 4	Nobpadol Tibpayachol	MFP	PPLE	Incumbent retiring.	Korn Meedee	PPLE
BANGKOK METROPOLITAN	Nonthaburi 5	Preeti Charoensilp	MFP	PPLE	Incumbent re-elected.	Preeti Charoensilp	PPLE
BANGKOK METROPOLITAN	Nonthaburi 6	Kunakorn Munnateerai	MFP	KT	Incumbent lost reelection.	Suthat Meesiri	PPLE
BANGKOK METROPOLITAN	Nonthaburi 7	Kiatikun Tonyang	MFP	PPLE	Incumbent re-elected.	Kiatikun Tonyang	PPLE
BANGKOK METROPOLITAN	Nonthaburi 8	Non Paisanlimcharoenkit	MFP	PPLE	Incumbent re-elected.	Non Paisanlimcharoenkit	PPLE
BANGKOK METROPOLITAN	Pathum Thani 1	Sorawee Supapanittha	MFP	Eco	Incumbent lost reelection in district 6.	Jesada Dontrisanoh	PPLE
BANGKOK METROPOLITAN	Pathum Thani 2 New district					Supachai Nopkham	PT
BANGKOK METROPOLITAN	Pathum Thani 3	Chonthicha Jaengraew	MFP	PPLE	Incumbent running as party list candidate.	Eksakh Homchuen	PPLE
BANGKOK METROPOLITAN	Pathum Thani 4	Sakon Suntornwanitkit	MFP	PPLE	Incumbent re-elected.	Sakon Suntornwanitkit	PPLE
BANGKOK METROPOLITAN	Pathum Thani 5 Redistricted from district 2	Jessada Dontrisanoh	MFP	PPLE	Incumbent re-elected in District 1.	Chetawan Tueprakhon	PPLE
BANGKOK METROPOLITAN	Pathum Thani 6	Chetawan Thuaprakhon	MFP	PPLE	Incumbent re-elected in District 5.	Thanapat Trakulphuchai	PPLE
BANGKOK METROPOLITAN	Pathum Thani 7 Redistricted from district 5	Manasnan Leenawarat	PT	PT	Incumbent retiring.	Phitsanu Phonthi	BJT
BANGKOK METROPOLITAN	Pathum Thani 8 Redistricted from district 7	Prasit Pattamapadungsak	MFP	PPLE	Incumbent lost reelection.	Pornpimol Thammasan	BJT
BANGKOK METROPOLITAN	Samut Prakan 1	Panida Mongkonsawat	MFP	PPLE	Incumbent re-elected.	Panida Mongkonsawat	PPLE
BANGKOK METROPOLITAN	Samut Prakan 2	Ratchanok Sukprasert	MFP	PPLE	Incumbent re-elected.	Ratchanok Sukprasert	PPLE
BANGKOK METROPOLITAN	Samut Prakan 3	Pichai Changjanyawong	MFP	PPLE	Incumbent re-elected.	Pichai Changjanyawong	PPLE
BANGKOK METROPOLITAN	Samut Prakan 4	Wuttinan Boonchoo	MFP	PPLE	Incumbent retiring.	Chansit Yodchim	PPLE
BANGKOK METROPOLITAN	Samut Prakan 5	Nittaya Meesri	MFP	PPLE	Incumbent re-elected.	Nittaya Meesri	PPLE
BANGKOK METROPOLITAN	Samut Prakan 6	Weerapat Kantha	MFP	PPLE	Incumbent lost reelection.	Thapakorn Kuljaroen	BJT
BANGKOK METROPOLITAN	Samut Prakan 7	Boonlert Saengpan	MFP	PPLE	Incumbent re-elected.	Boonlert Saengpan	PPLE
BANGKOK METROPOLITAN	Samut Prakan 8	Traiwan Eiamjai	MFP	PPLE	Incumbent retiring.	Thepparit Phasi	PPLE
BANGKOK METROPOLITAN	Samut Sakhon 1	Nattapon Sumanotham	MFP	PPLE	Incumbent re-elected.	Nattapon Sumanotham	PPLE
BANGKOK METROPOLITAN	Samut Sakhon 2 New district					Anussorn Kraiwatnusorn	BJT
BANGKOK METROPOLITAN	Samut Sakhon 3 Redistricted from district 2	Sirirot Tanikkun	MFP	PPLE	Incumbent re-elected.	Sirirot Tanikkun	PPLE
BANGKOK METROPOLITAN	Samut Sakhon 4 Redistricted from district 3	Sirasit Songnui	MFP	PPLE	Incumbent lost reelection in district 2.	Panya Chuanbun	BJT
CENTRAL	Ang Thong 1	Paradorn Prissananantakul	BJT	BJT	Incumbent re-elected.	Paradorn Prissananantakul	BJT
CENTRAL	Ang Thong 2	Kornwee Prissananantakul	BJT	BJT	Incumbent re-elected.	Kornwee Prissananantakul	BJT
CENTRAL	Chainat 1	Anucha Nakasai	UTN	PT	Incumbent re-elected.	Anucha Nakasai	PT
CENTRAL	Chainat 2	Montian Songpracha	BJT	BJT	Incumbent re-elected.	Montian Songpracha	BJT
CENTRAL	Kamphaeng Phet 1	Pai Leeke	PPRP	KT	Incumbent re-elected.	Pai Leeke	KT
CENTRAL	Kamphaeng Phet 2	Petchpoom Aponrat	PPRP	KT	Incumbent re-elected.	Petchpoom Aponrat	KT
CENTRAL	Kamphaeng Phet 3	Anun Ponumnuay	PPRP	PT	Incumbent retiring.	Nopphol Ponumnuay	PT
CENTRAL	Kamphaeng Phet 4	Parinya Roekrai	PPRP	KT	Incumbent lost reelection.	Surasit Wongwittayanant	PT
CENTRAL	Lopburi 1 Redistricted from district 4	Narin Klangpha	BJT	BJT	Incumbent re-elected.	Narin Klangpha	BJT
CENTRAL	Lopburi 2 Redistricted from district 1	Sittichai Loprasongsuk	PT	PT	Incumbent lost reelection.	Mallika Jirapunvanit	BJT
CENTRAL	Lopburi 3	Mallika Jirapunvanit	BJT	BJT	Incumbent re-elected in district 2.	Kanjanaporn Jirapunvanit	BJT
CENTRAL	Lopburi 4 Redistricted from district 2	Satit Taveebhol	MFP	PPLE	Incumbent lost reelection in district 1	Worawong Worappanya	PT
CENTRAL	Nakhon Nayok 1	Suraphon Boonima	PT	BJT	Incumbent lost reelection.	Piyawat Kittitanesuan	KT
CENTRAL	Nakhon Nayok 2	Kriangkrai Kittithanesuan	PT	BJT	Incumbent re-elected.	Kriangkrai Kittithanesuan	BJT
CENTRAL	Nakhon Sawan 1	Krit Hiran Lert Urit Phakdi	MFP	PPLE	Incumbent lost reelection.	Pattarawadee Niroj	BJT
CENTRAL	Nakhon Sawan 2	Songsak Songsermudomchai	PT	PT	Incumbent lost reelection.	Chanon Thaiseth	BJT
CENTRAL	Nakhon Sawan 3	Sanya Ninsupan	UTN	KT	Incumbent re-elected.	Sanya Ninsupan	KT
CENTRAL	Nakhon Sawan 4	Manop Sriphueng	BJT	BJT	Incumbent retiring.	Marup Sriphueng	BJT
CENTRAL	Nakhon Sawan 5	Peeradej Sirivansan	BJT	BJT	Incumbent re-elected.	Peeradej Sirivansan	BJT
CENTRAL	Nakhon Sawan 6	Prasart Tanprasert	CPK	BJT	Incumbent re-elected.	Prasart Tanprasert	BJT
CENTRAL	Phetchabun 1	Pimporn Pornputhipant	PPRP	BJT	Incumbent re-elected.	Pimporn Pornputhipant	BJT
CENTRAL	Phetchabun 2	Jakarat Puachuay	PPRP	KT	Incumbent lost reelection.	Nupayat Buain	BJT
CENTRAL	Phetchabun 3	Boonchai Kittitharasup	PPRP	BJT	Incumbent re-elected.	Boonchai Kittitharasup	BJT
CENTRAL	Phetchabun 4	Worachot Sukhonkajorn	PPRP	BJT	Incumbent re-elected.	Worachot Sukhonkajorn	BJT
CENTRAL	Phetchabun 5	Wanpen Promphat	PPRP	BJT	Incumbent re-elected.	Wanpen Promphat	BJT
CENTRAL	Phetchabun 6	Akara Tongjaisod	PPRP	BJT	Incumbent re-elected.	Akara Tongjaisod	BJT
CENTRAL	Phichit 1	Pattarapong Phataraprasit	BJT	BJT	Incumbent re-elected.	Pattarapong Phataraprasit	BJT
CENTRAL	Phichit 2	Winai Phataraprasit	BJT	BJT	Incumbent re-elected.	Winai Phataraprasit	BJT
CENTRAL	Phichit 3	Siriwat Khajonprasart	BJT	BJT	Incumbent re-elected.	Siriwat Khajonprasart	BJT
CENTRAL	Phitsanulok 1	Jadet Jantar	PT	PT	Incumbent lost reelection.	Natchanon Chanaburanasak	PPLE
CENTRAL	Phitsanulok 2	Noppol Leuangthongnara	PT	PT	Incumbent re-elected.	Noppol Leuangthongnara	PT
CENTRAL	Phitsanulok 3	Pongmanu Thongnak	UTN	BJT	Incumbent re-elected.	Pongmanu Thongnak	BJT
CENTRAL	Phitsanulok 4	Pimpiccha Chai Supakit Charoen	PT	PT	Incumbent lost reelection.	Niyom Changpinit	BJT
CENTRAL	Phitsanulok 5	Supapakorn Kityathikun	MFP	PPLE	Incumbent lost reelection.	Chuti Krairiksh	BJT
CENTRAL	Phra Nakhon Si Ayutthaya 1	Thawiwong Tothaviwong	MFP	PPLE	Incumbent lost reelection.	Thongpol Suksomboon	BJT
CENTRAL	Phra Nakhon Si Ayutthaya 2	Charin Wongpanthieng	MFP	PPLE	Incumbent lost reelection.	Nop Cheewanan	BJT
CENTRAL	Phra Nakhon Si Ayutthaya 3	Pimprueda Tanjararak	BJT	BJT	Incumbent re-elected.	Pimprueda Tanjararak	BJT
CENTRAL	Phra Nakhon Si Ayutthaya 4	Surasak Phancharoenworakul	BJT	BJT	Incumbent running as party list candidate.	Kongkrit Ramsak	BJT
CENTRAL	Phra Nakhon Si Ayutthaya 5	Pradit Sangkhai	BJT	BJT	Incumbent re-elected.	Pradit Sangkhai	BJT
CENTRAL	Saraburi 1	Sorapatch Sriprach	MFP	PPLE	Incumbent lost reelection.	Khunthong Saenwiset	BJT
CENTRAL	Saraburi 2	Atthaphon Wongprayoon	PT	BJT	Incumbent re-elected.	Atthaphon Wongprayoon	BJT
CENTRAL	Saraburi 3	Watcharapong Kuwijitsuwan	BJT	BJT	Incumbent re-elected.	Watcharapong Kuwijitsuwan	BJT
CENTRAL	Saraburi 4	Ongart Wongprayoon	PPRP	KT	Incumbent re-elected.	Ongart Wongprayoon	KT
CENTRAL	Sing Buri 1	Chotiwut Thanakamanusorn	PPRP	BJT	Incumbent re-elected.	Chotiwut Thanakamanusorn	BJT
CENTRAL	Sukhothai 1	Punsiri Kullanartsiri	PT	PT	Incumbent retiring.	Nakhanang Kullanartsiri	PT
CENTRAL	Sukhothai 2	Choosak Keereemasthong	PT	PT	Incumbent re-elected.	Choosak Keereemasthong	PT
CENTRAL	Sukhothai 3	Prapaporn Thongpaknam	PT	PT	Incumbent re-elected.	Prapaporn Thongpaknam	PT
CENTRAL	Sukhothai 4	Jawanchai Chaiwiratnukul	PT	PT	Incumbent lost reelection.	Somjate Limpabandhu	BJT
CENTRAL	Suphan Buri 1	Sorachud Suchitta	CT	BJT	Incumbent re-elected.	Sorachud Suchitta	BJT
CENTRAL	Suphan Buri 2	Nuttavood Prasertsuvan	CT	BJT	Incumbent re-elected.	Nuttavood Prasertsuvan	BJT
CENTRAL	Suphan Buri 3	Noppadol Matsri	CT	BJT	Incumbent lost reelection.	Nattachat Wongprasert	KT
CENTRAL	Suphan Buri 4	Samerkun Thiengtham	CT	BJT	Incumbent re-elected.	Samerkun Thiengtham	BJT
CENTRAL	Suphan Buri 5	Prapat Pothasuthon	CT	BJT	Incumbent re-elected.	Prapat Pothasuthon	BJT
CENTRAL	Uthai Thani 1	Jeset Thaised	BJT	BJT	Incumbent re-elected.	Jeset Thaised	BJT
CENTRAL	Uthai Thani 2	Chada Thaised	BJT	BJT	Incumbent re-elected.	Chada Thaised	BJT
EASTERN	Chachoengsao 1	Thitima Chaisaeng	PT	PT	Incumbent re-elected.	Thitima Chaisaeng	PT
EASTERN	Chachoengsao 2	Atthakorn Sirilattyakorn	PPRP	KT	Incumbent re-elected.	Atthakorn Sirilattyakorn	KT
EASTERN	Chachoengsao 3	Sakchai Tancharoen	PT	PT	Incumbent lost reelection.	Chaiwat Paopeamthapi	KT
EASTERN	Chachoengsao 4	Jirat Thongsuwan	MFP	PPLE	Incumbent retiring.	Yodsingha Liemlert	KT
EASTERN	Chanthaburi 1	Warayut Thongsuk	MFP	PPLE	Incumbent lost reelection.	Surapol Wiratyosinthin	BJT
EASTERN	Chanthaburi 2	Prachyawan Chaisueb	MFP	PPLE	Incumbent lost reelection.	Khampir Chunban	BJT
EASTERN	Chanthaburi 3	Yanathicha Buapuean	MFP	PPLE	Incumbent retiring.	Charat Neranchar	BJT
EASTERN	Chonburi 1	Worat Sirirak	MFP	PPLE	Incumbent lost reelection.	Suchart Chomklin	BJT
EASTERN	Chonburi 2	Wannida Nophasit	MFP	PPLE	Incumbent re-elected.	Wannida Nophasit	PPLE
EASTERN	Chonburi 3	Chawan Phonchai	MFP	PPLE	Incumbent lost reelection.	Sittipat Pausut	BJT
EASTERN	Chonburi 4	Jirawut Singtothong	UTN	BJT	Incumbent re-elected.	Jirawut Singtothong	BJT
EASTERN	Chonburi 5	Anan Pridasutthichit	PT	BJT	Incumbent re-elected.	Anan Pridasutthichit	BJT
EASTERN	Chonburi 6	Krit Cheewathamanont	MFP	KT	Incumbent lost reelection.	Narumas Piambandit	PPLE
EASTERN	Chonburi 7	Sahatsawat Koomkong	MFP	PPLE	Incumbent re-elected.	Sahatsawat Koomkong	PPLE
EASTERN	Chonburi 8	Charus Koomkainam	MFP	PPLE	Incumbent retiring.	Chaowalit Saenguthai	BJT
EASTERN	Chonburi 9	Yodchai Puengporn	MFP	PPLE	Incumbent re-elected.	Yodchai Puengporn	PPLE
EASTERN	Chonburi 10	Sathira Phuakpraphun	PPRP	KT	Incumbent lost reelection.	Thanatharn Pramoonpong	PPLE
EASTERN	Prachinburi 1	Amnat Vilawan	BJT	BJT	Incumbent re-elected.	Amnat Vilawan	BJT
EASTERN	Prachinburi 2	Wuthipong Thonglao	MFP	CPK	Incumbent retiring.	Chayuth Pummakanchana	BJT
EASTERN	Prachinburi 3	Salit Butnain	BJT	BJT	Incumbent re-elected.	Salit Butnain	BJT
EASTERN	Rayong 1	Kamonthat Kitti Sunthornsakul	MFP	PPLE	Incumbent re-elected.	Kamonthat Kitti Sunthornsakul	PPLE
EASTERN	Rayong 2	Krit Silpachai	MFP	PPLE	Incumbent re-elected.	Krit Silpachai	PPLE
EASTERN	Rayong 3	Pongsathorn Sornphetnarin	MFP	PPLE	Incumbent lost reelection.	Pasin Pitutecha	Dem
EASTERN	Rayong 4	Chutipong Phiphoppinyo	MFP	PPLE	Incumbent lost reelection.	Chatchai Pitutecha	BJT
EASTERN	Rayong 5	Sawangchit Lao Harojanphan	MFP	PPLE	Incumbent retiring.	Wacharapong Sirirak	PPLE
EASTERN	Sa Kaeo 1	Kwanruen Thienthong	PPRP	PPRP	Incumbent retiring.	Badi Thienthong	PPRP
EASTERN	Sa Kaeo 2	Treenuch Thienthong	PPRP	PPRP	Incumbent re-elected.	Treenuch Thienthong	PPRP
EASTERN	Sa Kaeo 3	Sorawong Thienthong	PT	PT	Incumbent lost reelection.	Surasak Chingnawan	KT
EASTERN	Trat 1	Sakdinai Numnu	MFP	PPLE	Incumbent retiring.	Pannaset Numnu	PPLE
NORTHEASTERN	Amnat Charoen 1	Suksomruay Wantaneekul	BJT	BJT	Incumbent re-elected.	Suksomruay Wantaneekul	BJT
NORTHEASTERN	Amnat Charoen 2	Yaneenat Khemnak	BJT	BJT	Incumbent re-elected.	Yaneenat Khemnak	BJT
NORTHEASTERN	Bueng Kan 1	Siam Pengthong	BJT	BJT	Incumbent re-elected.	Siam Pengthong	BJT
NORTHEASTERN	Bueng Kan 2	Ornuma Boonsiri	BJT	KT	Incumbent lost reelection.	Suriya Paensukha	BJT
NORTHEASTERN	Bueng Kan 3	Niphon Khonkhayan	PT	PT	Incumbent lost reelection.	Viroj Saerawong	BJT
NORTHEASTERN	Buriram 1	Sanong Thep-aksornnarong	BJT	BJT	Incumbent re-elected.	Sanong Thep-aksornnarong	BJT
NORTHEASTERN	Buriram 2	Chaichanok Chidchob	BJT	BJT	Incumbent running as party list candidate.	Natthida Lekkudakorn	BJT
NORTHEASTERN	Buriram 3	Adipong Thitipitaya	BJT	BJT	Incumbent re-elected.	Adipong Thitipitaya	BJT
NORTHEASTERN	Buriram 4	Rungsikron Timatarueka	BJT	BJT	Incumbent retiring.	Chonnakant Timatarueka	BJT
NORTHEASTERN	Buriram 5	Sophon Zaram	BJT	BJT	Incumbent re-elected.	Sophon Zaram	BJT
NORTHEASTERN	Buriram 6	Sak Zaram	BJT	BJT	Incumbent re-elected.	Sak Zaram	BJT
NORTHEASTERN	Buriram 7	Pornchai Srisuriyayothin	BJT	BJT	Incumbent re-elected.	Pornchai Srisuriyayothin	BJT
NORTHEASTERN	Buriram 8	Trithep Ngamgamol	BJT	BJT	Incumbent re-elected.	Trithep Ngamgamol	BJT
NORTHEASTERN	Buriram 9	Rungrot Thongsri	BJT	BJT	Incumbent re-elected.	Rungrot Thongsri	BJT
NORTHEASTERN	Buriram 10	Jakkrid Thongsri	BJT	BJT	Incumbent re-elected.	Jakkrid Thongsri	BJT
NORTHEASTERN	Chaiyaphum 1	Ochit Kiatkongchuchai	PT	PT	Incumbent re-elected.	Ochit Kiatkongchuchai	PT
NORTHEASTERN	Chaiyaphum 2	Choengchai Chaleerin	PT	PT	Incumbent re-elected.	Choengchai Chaleerin	PT
NORTHEASTERN	Chaiyaphum 3	Samrit Thaensap	BJT	BJT	Incumbent re-elected.	Samrit Thaensap	BJT
NORTHEASTERN	Chaiyaphum 4	Kanchana Janghwa	PPRP	KT	Incumbent lost reelection.	Suchada Thaensap	BJT
NORTHEASTERN	Chaiyaphum 5	Siva Pongteeradul	PT	PT	Incumbent re-elected.	Siva Pongteeradul	PT
NORTHEASTERN	Chaiyaphum 6	Chawengsak Rengpaiboonwong	BJT	BJT	Incumbent re-elected.	Chawengsak Rengpaiboonwong	BJT
NORTHEASTERN	Chaiyaphum 7	Akarasaenkhiri Lohweera	PPRP	KT	Incumbent re-elected.	Akarasaenkhiri Lohweera	KT
NORTHEASTERN	Kalasin 1	Wirat Pimpanit	PT	PT	Incumbent re-elected.	Wirat Pimpanit	PT
NORTHEASTERN	Kalasin 2	Palakorn Pimpanit	PT	PT	Incumbent re-elected.	Palakorn Pimpanit	PT
NORTHEASTERN	Kalasin 3	Chamlong Poonnuwata	PPRP	KT	Incumbent re-elected.	Chamlong Poonnuwata	KT
NORTHEASTERN	Kalasin 4	Prapa Hengpaiboon	BJT	PPRP	Incumbent lost reelection.	Natwatchai Pimpanit	PT
NORTHEASTERN	Kalasin 5	Thinphol Sritares	PT	PT	Incumbent lost reelection.	Boonyapa Punanittha	BJT
NORTHEASTERN	Kalasin 6 Redistricted from district 5	Prasert Boonruang	PT	BJT	Incumbent lost reelection.	Channawut Uttho	PT
NORTHEASTERN	Khon Kaen 1	Weeranan Huadsri	MFP	PPLE	Incumbent re-elected.	Weeranan Huadsri	PPLE
NORTHEASTERN	Khon Kaen 2	Itthiphol Chontarasiri	MFP	PPLE	Incumbent re-elected.	Itthiphol Chontarasiri	PPLE
NORTHEASTERN	Khon Kaen 3	Chatchawan Apirakmankong	MFP	PPLE	Incumbent lost reelection.	Ekkachai Subsarakham	KT
NORTHEASTERN	Khon Kaen 4	Ekkarat Changlao	BJT	KT	Incumbent retiring.	Rungrock Yensaban	PT
NORTHEASTERN	Khon Kaen 5	Phakawat Srisurapol	PT	PT	Incumbent lost reelection.	Prachya Ngokchai	KT
NORTHEASTERN	Khon Kaen 6	Singhaphon Deenang	PT	PT	Incumbent retiring.	Wisrut Puapeng	BJT
NORTHEASTERN	Khon Kaen 7	Surapot Taochareonsuk	PT	PT	Incumbent re-elected.	Surapot Taochareonsuk	PT
NORTHEASTERN	Khon Kaen 8	Wipanee Phukamwong	PT	PT	Incumbent lost reelection.	Thanik Masipitak	KT
NORTHEASTERN	Khon Kaen 9	Saratsanun Unnopporn	PT	BJT	Incumbent lost reelection.	Nattaphol Klumriangthong	PT
NORTHEASTERN	Khon Kaen 10	Wanniwat Somboon	PT	PT	Incumbent lost reelection.	Potkorn Ananopkorn	BJT
NORTHEASTERN	Khon Kaen 11	Ongart Chatchaipolrat	BJT	BJT	Incumbent re-elected.	Ongart Chatchaipolrat	BJT
NORTHEASTERN	Loei 1	Lertsak Pattanachaikul	PT	PT	Incumbent re-elected.	Lertsak Pattanachaikul	PT
NORTHEASTERN	Loei 2	Saran Timsuwan	PT	PT	Incumbent re-elected.	Saran Timsuwan	PT
NORTHEASTERN	Loei 3	Thanayose Thimsuwan	BJT	BJT	Incumbent re-elected.	Thanayose Thimsuwan	BJT
NORTHEASTERN	Loei 4	Somjate Sangcharoenrat	PT	PT	Incumbent re-elected.	Somjate Sangcharoenrat	PT
NORTHEASTERN	Maha Sarakham 1	Kittisak Kanasawat	PT	PT	Incumbent retiring.	Rittirong Phumisawan	BJT
NORTHEASTERN	Maha Sarakham 2	Chaiwattana Tinarat	PT	PT	Incumbent lost reelection.	Prawatt Thongsomboon	BJT
NORTHEASTERN	Maha Sarakham 3	Latthachai Chokchaiwatakorn	BJT	BJT	Incumbent re-elected.	Latthachai Chokchaiwatakorn	BJT
NORTHEASTERN	Maha Sarakham 4	Sanphaphanyu Siripil	PT	PT	Incumbent lost reelection.	Wichian Chongchuwanich	BJT
NORTHEASTERN	Maha Sarakham 5	Jirawat Siripanich	PT	PT	Incumbent re-elected.	Jirawat Siripanich	PT
NORTHEASTERN	Maha Sarakham 6	Rat Klangsaeng	PT	PT	Incumbent lost reelection.	Komkai Udonpim	BJT
NORTHEASTERN	Mukdahan 1	Wiriya Thongpha	PPRP	BJT	Incumbent re-elected.	Wiriya Thongpha	BJT
NORTHEASTERN	Mukdahan 2	Nakorn Chareephan	MFP	PPLE	Incumbent lost reelection.	Lekhadam Trisaranakom Nongruang	KT
NORTHEASTERN	Nakhon Phanom 1	Phumiphat Phacharasap	PT	PT	Incumbent lost reelection.	Supaphani Phosu	BJT
NORTHEASTERN	Nakhon Phanom 2	Manaporn Chareonsri	PT	PT	Incumbent re-elected.	Manaporn Chareonsri	PT
NORTHEASTERN	Nakhon Phanom 3	Alongkot Maneekart	BJT	BJT	Incumbent re-elected.	Alongkot Maneekart	BJT
NORTHEASTERN	Nakhon Phanom 4	Chukan Kulwongsa	BJT	BJT	Incumbent lost reelection.	Chanchai Khamjampa	PT
NORTHEASTERN	Nakhon Ratchasima 1	Chat Suphatvanich	MFP	PPLE	Incumbent re-elected.	Chat Suphatvanich	PPLE
NORTHEASTERN	Nakhon Ratchasima 2	Piyachart Ruchipornwasin	MFP	PPLE	Incumbent lost reelection.	Wacharapon Tomornsak	PT
NORTHEASTERN	Nakhon Ratchasima 3	Suttasit Potthasak	MFP	PPLE	Incumbent re-elected.	Suttasit Potthasak	PPLE
NORTHEASTERN	Nakhon Ratchasima 4	Natjira Immwiset	PT	PT	Incumbent re-elected.	Natjira Immwiset	PT
NORTHEASTERN	Nakhon Ratchasima 5	Somkiat Tandiloktrakul	PT	PT	Incumbent re-elected.	Somkiat Tandiloktrakul	PT
NORTHEASTERN	Nakhon Ratchasima 6	Kosol Pattama	PT	BJT	Incumbent lost reelection.	Patcharawan Phinyo	PT
NORTHEASTERN	Nakhon Ratchasima 7	Piyanuch Yindeesuk	PT	PT	Incumbent re-elected.	Piyanuch Yindeesuk	PT
NORTHEASTERN	Nakhon Ratchasima 8	Nikorn Somklang	PT	PT	Incumbent re-elected.	Nikorn Somklang	PT
NORTHEASTERN	Nakhon Ratchasima 9	Polpee Suwanchawee	BJT	BJT	Incumbent re-elected.	Polpee Suwanchawee	BJT
NORTHEASTERN	Nakhon Ratchasima 10	Aphicha Loedphacharakamon	PT	PT	Incumbent lost reelection.	Boonjong Wongtaitrat	BJT
NORTHEASTERN	Nakhon Ratchasima 11	Arthit Wangsuphakitkosol	PT	PT	Incumbent re-elected.	Arthit Wangsuphakitkosol	PT
NORTHEASTERN	Nakhon Ratchasima 12	Noraset Sirirojanaku	PT	PT	Incumbent re-elected.	Noraset Sirirojanaku	PT
NORTHEASTERN	Nakhon Ratchasima 13	Patchara Chanruangthong	PT	PT	Incumbent re-elected.	Patchara Chanruangthong	PT
NORTHEASTERN	Nakhon Ratchasima 14	Sirasit Lertduailap	PT	PT	Incumbent retiring.	Nueng Khatiyanont	PPLE
NORTHEASTERN	Nakhon Ratchasima 15	Rachata Dankul	PT	PT	Incumbent re-elected.	Rachata Dankul	PT
NORTHEASTERN	Nakhon Ratchasima 16	Pornthep Sirirojanakul	PT	PT	Incumbent lost reelection.	Tatirat Rattanaset	BJT
NORTHEASTERN	Nong Bua Lamphu 1	Siam Hathasongkorh	PT	PT	Incumbent retiring.	Chayanun Keletmek	KT
NORTHEASTERN	Nong Bua Lamphu 2	Chaiya Promma	PT	KT	Incumbent lost reelection.	Rungphet Srikanchana	PT
NORTHEASTERN	Nong Bua Lamphu 3	Naphol Cheykhamhaeng	PT	PT	Incumbent lost reelection.	Pornnarong Nilnamah	KT
NORTHEASTERN	Nong Khai 1	Kraa Trakulpornpong	PPRP	PPRP	Incumbent re-elected.	Kraa Trakulpornpong	PPRP
NORTHEASTERN	Nong Khai 2	Chanok Chanthathong	PT	PT	Incumbent lost reelection.	Yutthana Sitabut	PPRP
NORTHEASTERN	Nong Khai 3	Ekthanad Inrod	PT	PT	Incumbent lost reelection.	Sakda Chantharasuwan	BJT
NORTHEASTERN	Roi Et 1	Anurak Chureemas	CT	BJT	Incumbent re-elected.	Anurak Chureemas	BJT
NORTHEASTERN	Roi Et 2	Chalard Kharmchaung	PT	PT	Incumbent lost reelection.	Ekrat Phonsue	KT
NORTHEASTERN	Roi Et 3	Ratchanee Phonsue	PPRP	KT	Incumbent re-elected.	Ratchanee Phonsue	KT
NORTHEASTERN	Roi Et 4	Narakon Namuangruk	PT	BJT	Incumbent lost reelection.	Supphasit Kocharoenyot	PT
NORTHEASTERN	Roi Et 5	Jiraporn Sindhuprai	PT	PT	Incumbent re-elected.	Jiraporn Sindhuprai	PT
NORTHEASTERN	Roi Et 6	Kitti Somsub	PT	BJT	Incumbent lost reelection.	Thongli Mihinkong	PT
NORTHEASTERN	Roi Et 7	Chatchawan Phatayathai	TST	TST	Incumbent re-elected.	Chatchawan Phatayathai	TST
NORTHEASTERN	Roi Et 8	Chayapa Sinthuprai	PT	PT	Incumbent re-elected.	Chayapa Sinthuprai	PT
NORTHEASTERN	Sisaket 1	Thanet Kruearat	PT	PT	Incumbent lost reelection.	Siripong Angkasakunkiat	BJT
NORTHEASTERN	Sisaket 2	Surachart Charnpradit	PT	PT	Incumbent lost reelection.	Supphakit Sihaphak	BJT
NORTHEASTERN	Sisaket 3	Thana Kitpaiboonchai	BJT	BJT	Incumbent re-elected.	Thana Kitpaiboonchai	BJT
NORTHEASTERN	Sisaket 4	Phumin Leeteeraprasert	PT	KT	Incumbent lost reelection.	Chitphon Traisonnakun	BJT
NORTHEASTERN	Sisaket 5	Amornthep Sommai	PT	PT	Incumbent lost reelection.	Jintawan Trisaranakul	BJT
NORTHEASTERN	Sisaket 6	Werapon Jitsumrit	PT	PT	Incumbent re-elected.	Werapon Jitsumrit	PT
NORTHEASTERN	Sisaket 7	Willada Inchat	PT	PT	Incumbent re-elected.	Willada Inchat	PT
NORTHEASTERN	Sisaket 8	Arsphol Suntraiphop	BJT	BJT	Incumbent re-elected.	Arsphol Suntraiphop	BJT
NORTHEASTERN	Sisaket 9	Nuchanart Jaruwongsathien	PT	KT	Incumbent lost reelection.	Withawat Traisonnakun	BJT
NORTHEASTERN	Sakon Nakhon 1	Abhichart Tiraswasdichai	PT	PT	Incumbent lost reelection in district 2.	Sirapop Somphol	KT
NORTHEASTERN	Sakon Nakhon 2	Chatri Laprom	Dem	KT	Incumbent re-elected.	Chatri Laprom	KT
NORTHEASTERN	Sakon Nakhon 3	Jiratchaya Supso	PT	PT	Incumbent re-elected.	Jiratchaya Supso	PT
NORTHEASTERN	Sakon Nakhon 4	Pattana Sapso	PT	PT	Incumbent re-elected.	Pattana Sapso	PT
NORTHEASTERN	Sakon Nakhon 5	Chaimongkol Chairob	PPRP	BJT	Incumbent lost reelection.	Wongakul Boonsom	KT
NORTHEASTERN	Sakon Nakhon 6	Sakuna Saranun	PT	PT	Incumbent lost reelection	Borom Engchuan	BJT
NORTHEASTERN	Sakon Nakhon 7	Kasem Upara	PT	PT	Incumbent retiring.	Isarapong Upara	PT
NORTHEASTERN	Surin 1	Pakorn Mungcharoenporn	BJT	BJT	Incumbent running as party list candidate.	Benya Mungcharoenporn	BJT
NORTHEASTERN	Surin 2	Chuchai Mungcharoenporn	PT	PT	Incumbent lost reelection.	Natthaphon Charadrapheephong	BJT
NORTHEASTERN	Surin 3	Pakamas Charoenphan	BJT	BJT	Incumbent re-elected.	Pakamas Charoenphan	BJT
NORTHEASTERN	Surin 4	Pornthep Poonsrithanakul	PT	PT	Incumbent lost reelection.	Suri Thammat	BJT
NORTHEASTERN	Surin 5	Kroomanit Sangpoom	PT	PT	Incumbent lost reelection.	Phuchong Suphakvarangkul	BJT
NORTHEASTERN	Surin 6	Lumpert Puapattanachote	BJT	BJT	Incumbent re-elected.	Lumpert Puapattanachote	BJT
NORTHEASTERN	Surin 7	Rueangwit Koonwatanapong	BJT	BJT	Incumbent re-elected.	Rueangwit Koonwatanapong	BJT
NORTHEASTERN	Surin 8	Patida Tantiratnanon	BJT	BJT	Incumbent re-elected.	Patida Tantiratnanon	BJT
NORTHEASTERN	Ubon Ratchathani 1	Worasit Kantinan	PT	PT	Incumbent re-elected.	Worasit Kantinan	PT
NORTHEASTERN	Ubon Ratchathani 2	Wuttipong Nambutr	Dem	KT	Incumbent lost reelection.	Narongchai Veerakul	TRP
NORTHEASTERN	Ubon Ratchathani 3	Pimpakarn Polsamak	TRP	TRP	Incumbent re-elected.	Pimpakarn Polsamak	TRP
NORTHEASTERN	Ubon Ratchathani 4	Kittunya Wajadee	PT	PT	Incumbent re-elected.	Kittunya Wajadee	PT
NORTHEASTERN	Ubon Ratchathani 5	Suthichai Charoonnet	BJT	BJT	Incumbent re-elected.	Suthichai Charoonnet	BJT
NORTHEASTERN	Ubon Ratchathani 6	Thantharee Suntaphan	PT	PT	Incumbent re-elected.	Thantharee Suntaphan	PT
NORTHEASTERN	Ubon Ratchathani 7	Sudarat Phitakpornphanlop	PT	BJT	Incumbent re-elected.	Sudarat Phitakpornphanlop	BJT
NORTHEASTERN	Ubon Ratchathani 8	Boonthida Somchai	BJT	BJT	Incumbent re-elected.	Boonthida Somchai	BJT
NORTHEASTERN	Ubon Ratchathani 9	Rampoon Tantiwanichanont	TST	KT	Incumbent lost reelection.	Jitrawan Wangsuphakitkosol	TRP
NORTHEASTERN	Ubon Ratchathani 10	Somsak Boonprachom	TRP	TRP	Incumbent re-elected.	Somsak Boonprachom	TRP
NORTHEASTERN	Ubon Ratchathani 11	Tuangthip Jintawet	BJT	BJT	Incumbent re-elected.	Tuangthip Jintawet	BJT
NORTHEASTERN	Udon Thani 1	Nattapong Pipatchaisiri	MFP	PPLE	Incumbent retiring.	Anan Amarin	PPLE
NORTHEASTERN	Udon Thani 2	Hathairat Petchpanomporn	PT	PT	Incumbent re-elected.	Hathairat Petchpanomporn	PT
NORTHEASTERN	Udon Thani 3	Rang Thurapon	TST	BJT	Incumbent re-elected.	Rang Thurapon	BJT
NORTHEASTERN	Udon Thani 4	Panu Pornwattana	PT	BJT	Incumbent lost reelection.	Traipop Kamphet	PT
NORTHEASTERN	Udon Thani 5	Kornwee Sarakham	PT	PT	Incumbent lost reelection.	Buangern Rodkanmuang	BJT
NORTHEASTERN	Udon Thani 6	Adisak Kaewmungkunsub	TST	BJT	Incumbent re-elected.	Adisak Kaewmungkunsub	BJT
NORTHEASTERN	Udon Thani 7	Thirachai Saenkaew	PT	PT	Incumbent lost reelection.	Suriya Wong-Ari	PPLE
NORTHEASTERN	Udon Thani 8	Graingsak Fhayseengam	PT	PT	Incumbent lost reelection.	Suphiraphat Phumiphak	BJT
NORTHEASTERN	Udon Thani 9	Watcharaphon Khaokham	PT	PT	Incumbent re-elected.	Watcharaphon Khaokham	PT
NORTHEASTERN	Udon Thani 10	Thiapjutha Khaokham	PT	PT	Incumbent re-elected.	Thiapjutha Khaokham	PT
NORTHEASTERN	Yasothon 1	Supaporn Slabsri	TST	BJT	Incumbent re-elected.	Supaporn Slabsri	BJT
NORTHEASTERN	Yasothon 2	Boonkaeo Somwong	PT	PT	Incumbent lost reelection.	Warayut Jongaksorn	BJT
NORTHEASTERN	Yasothon 3	Thanaphat Srichana	BJT	BJT	Incumbent re-elected.	Thanaphat Srichana	BJT
NORTHERN	Chiang Mai 1	Phetcharat Maichompoo	MFP	PPLE	Incumbent re-elected.	Phetcharat Maichompoo	PPLE
NORTHERN	Chiang Mai 2	Karnik Chantada	MFP	PPLE	Incumbent re-elected.	Karnik Chantada	PPLE
NORTHERN	Chiang Mai 3	Nattapon Towichakchaikul	MFP	PPLE	Incumbent re-elected.	Nattapon Towichakchaikul	PPLE
NORTHERN	Chiang Mai 4	Putita Chaianan	MFP	PPLE	Incumbent re-elected.	Putita Chaianan	PPLE
NORTHERN	Chiang Mai 5	Julapun Amornvivat	PT	PT	Incumbent retiring.	Somchit Kantaya	PPLE
NORTHERN	Chiang Mai 6	Oraphan Chantaruang	MFP	PPLE	Incumbent lost reelection.	Supanun Panyatip	KT
NORTHERN	Chiang Mai 7	Balance Utcharoen	MFP	PPLE	Incumbent lost reelection.	Karun Koocharoenchaiyakul	KT
NORTHERN	Chiang Mai 8	Pattarapong Leelaphat	MFP	PPLE	Incumbent re-elected.	Pattarapong Leelaphat	PPLE
NORTHERN	Chiang Mai 9	Nares Thamrongthiphayakhun	PPRP	KT	Incumbent re-elected.	Nares Thamrongthiphayakhun	KT
NORTHERN	Chiang Mai 10	Srisopha Kotkhamlue	PT	PT	Incumbent lost reelection.	Norapol Tantimontri	KT
NORTHERN	Chiang Rai 1	Chitwan Chinanuwat	MFP	PPLE	Incumbent lost reelection.	Thanarath Chongsuthanamanee	PT
NORTHERN	Chiang Rai 2	Piyarat Tiyapairat	PT	PT	Incumbent re-elected.	Piyarat Tiyapairat	PT
NORTHERN	Chiang Rai 3	Thakoon Yasaeng	MFP	PPLE	Incumbent lost reelection.	Phitak Saengkham	KT
NORTHERN	Chiang Rai 4 Redistricted from district 3	Wisaradee Techateerawat	PT	PT	Incumbent lost reelection.	Surasit Jiamwijak	KT
NORTHERN	Chiang Rai 5	Thedchart Chaiphong	PT	PT	Incumbent lost reelection.	Rangsan Wanchaithanawong	BJT
NORTHERN	Chiang Rai 6	Chulalak Khansutam	MFP	PPLE	Incumbent lost reelection.	Molticha Chaiyabal	KT
NORTHERN	Chiang Rai 7	Pichet Chuamuangphan	PT	BJT	Incumbent retiring.	Suttipong Wanchaythanawong	KT
NORTHERN	Lampang 1	Tipa Paweenasathien	MFP	PPLE	Incumbent re-elected.	Tipa Paweenasathien	PPLE
NORTHERN	Lampang 2	Thanathorn Lohsoonthorn	PT	PT	Incumbent lost reelection.	Dachai Ekpathapi	KT
NORTHERN	Lampang 3	Chonthanee Chueanoi	MFP	PPLE	Incumbent re-elected.	Chonthanee Chueanoi	PPLE
NORTHERN	Lampang 4	Raphatsorn Niyamosoth	MFP	PT	Incumbent lost reelection.	Penpak Rattanakhamfu	KT
NORTHERN	Lamphun 1	Wittawisit Punsuanpluk	MFP	PPLE	Incumbent re-elected.	Wittawisit Punsuanpluk	PPLE
NORTHERN	Lamphun 2	Rangsan Maneerat	PT	PT	Incumbent lost reelection.	Chatchapee Wannapirach	PPLE
NORTHERN	Mae Hong Son 1	Pakorn Chinakham	PPRP	KT	Incumbent re-elected.	Pakorn Chinakham	KT
NORTHERN	Mae Hong Son 2	Sombat Yasin	Dem	BJT	Incumbent re-elected.	Sombat Yasin	BJT
NORTHERN	Nan 1	Songyos Ramsut	PT	PT	Incumbent lost reelection.	Chaowit Innoi	PPLE
NORTHERN	Nan 2	Chonlanan Srikaew	PT	PT	Incumbent lost reelection	Prasit Notha	KT
NORTHERN	Nan 3	Nattapong Supriyasilp	PT	PT	Incumbent lost reelection.	Charoen Apipathorakosol	PPLE
NORTHERN	Phayao 1	Thamanat Prompow	PPRP	KT	Incumbent running as party list candidate.	Akara Prompow	KT
NORTHERN	Phayao 2	Anurat Tanbanjong	PPRP	KT	Incumbent re-elected.	Anurat Tanbanjong	KT
NORTHERN	Phayao 3	Jeeradech Srivirach	PPRP	KT	Incumbent re-elected.	Jeeradech Srivirach	KT
NORTHERN	Phare 1	Thosaporn Sereerak	PT	PT	Incumbent lost reelection.	Chanokanan Suphasiri	BJT
NORTHERN	Phrae 2	Niyom Wiwattanaditkul	PT	PT	Incumbent lost reelection.	Chanathip Supasiri	BJT
NORTHERN	Phrae 3	Worawat Auapinyakul	PT	PT	Incumbent lost reelection.	Laksanaree Duangtadam	PPLE
NORTHERN	Uttaradit 1	Kritsana Seehalak	PT	PT	Incumbent retiring.	Pichayut Pojit	BJT
NORTHERN	Uttaradit 2	Warut Siriwat	PT	PT	Incumbent lost reelection.	Rosarin Saranket	NOP
NORTHERN	Uttaradit 3	Rawee Lek-uthai	PT	PT	Incumbent re-elected.	Rawee Lek-uthai	PT
SOUTHERN	Chumphon 1	Wichai Sudsawat	UTN	BJT	Incumbent re-elected.	Wichai Sudsawat	BJT
SOUTHERN	Chumphon 2	Sant Saetang	UTN	KT	Incumbent lost reelection.	Kittisak Phromrat	BJT
SOUTHERN	Chumphon 3	Supol Jullasai	UTN	BJT	Incumbent re-elected.	Supol Jullasai	BJT
SOUTHERN	Krabi 1	Kitti Kittithornkul	BJT	BJT	Incumbent re-elected.	Kitti Kittithornkul	BJT
SOUTHERN	Krabi 2	Thiradet Tangmankorkit	BJT	BJT	Incumbent re-elected	Thiradet Tangmankorkit	BJT
SOUTHERN	Krabi 3	Saritpong Kiewkong	BJT	BJT	Incumbent retiring.	Kittichai Engchuan	BJT
SOUTHERN	Nakhon Si Thammarat 1	Rachit Sudpoom	Dem	BJT	Incumbent lost reelection.	Songsak Musikong	Dem
SOUTHERN	Nakhon Si Thammarat 2 Redistricted from district 7	Songsak Musikong	Dem	Dem	Incumbent re-elected in district 1.	Nantawan Wichian	BJT
SOUTHERN	Nakhon Si Thammarat 3	Pitakdej Dejdecho	Dem	Dem	Incumbent re-elected.	Pitakdej Dejdecho	Dem
SOUTHERN	Nakhon Si Thammarat 4	Yuttakarn Rattanamas	Dem	KT	Incumbent lost reelection.	Kanokporn Dejdecho	Dem
SOUTHERN	Nakhon Si Thammarat 5 Redistricted from district 6	Sutham Jaritngam	PPRP	BJT	Incumbent lost reelection.	Somsak Saeng-Arayakun	KT
SOUTHERN	Nakhon Si Thammarat 6 Redistricted from district 7	Shatha Khaokham	BJT	BJT	Incumbent lost reelection.	Chomkrai Sawadiwong	Dem
SOUTHERN	Nakhon Si Thammarat 7 Redistricted from district 8	Kongkiat Ketsombat	KT	KT	Incumbent lost reelection.	Aphinan Samosorn	BJT
SOUTHERN	Nakhon Si Thammarat 8 Redistricted from district 9	Aoypornsri Chaowalit	Dem	BJT	Incumbent re-elected.	Aoypornsri Chaowalit	BJT
SOUTHERN	Nakhon Si Thammarat 9 Redistricted from district 10	Pimphattra Wichaikul	UTN	BJT	Incumbent re-elected.	Pimphattra Wichaikul	BJT
SOUTHERN	Narathiwat 1	Watchara Yaworhasan	UTN	BJT	Incumbent lost reelection.	Lutfi Haji Etae	KT
SOUTHERN	Narathiwat 2	Amin Mayusoh	PPRP	KT	Incumbent re-elected.	Amin Mayusoh	KT
SOUTHERN	Narathiwat 3	Samphan Mayusoh	PPRP	KT	Incumbent re-elected.	Samphan Mayusoh	KT
SOUTHERN	Narathiwat 4	Zakariya Sa-i	BJT	BJT	Incumbent re-elected.	Zakariya Sa-i	BJT
SOUTHERN	Narathiwat 5	Kamonsak Leewamoh	PCC	PCC	Incumbent re-elected.	Kamonsak Leewamoh	PCC
SOUTHERN	Pattani 1	Woravit Baru	PCC	PCC	Incumbent lost reelection.	Baharuddin Yuso	BJT
SOUTHERN	Pattani 2	Kosey Mamu	PPRP	BJT	Incumbent re-elected.	Kosey Mamu	BJT
SOUTHERN	Pattani 3	Somsomut Benjalak	PCC	PCC	Incumbent lost reelection.	Burhan Samo	BJT
SOUTHERN	Pattani 4	Yunaidee Waba	Dem	KT	Incumbent re-elected.	Yunaidee Waba	KT
SOUTHERN	Pattani 5	Sahe Muhammad Al-Idrus	PCC	BJT	Incumbent re-elected.	Sahe Muhammad Al-Idrus	BJT
SOUTHERN	Phang Nga 1	Atthaphon Trisri	BJT	BJT	Incumbent re-elected.	Atthaphon Trisri	BJT
SOUTHERN	Phang Nga 2	Chakaj Pattanakitwibul	PPRP	BJT	Incumbent re-elected.	Chakaj Pattanakitwibul	BJT
SOUTHERN	Phatthalung 1	Supatchee Thammaphet	Dem	KT	Incumbent lost reelection.	Athikun Kongmee	BJT
SOUTHERN	Phatthalung 2	Nitisak Thammaphet	UTN	PT	Incumbent lost reelection.	Warot Therdveerapong	BJT
SOUTHERN	Phatthalung 3	Romtham Khamnurak	Dem	BJT	Incumbent running as party list candidate.	Charan Chankaew	KT
SOUTHERN	Phuket 1	Somchat Techathavorncharoen	MFP	PPLE	Incumbent re-elected.	Somchat Techathavorncharoen	PPLE
SOUTHERN	Phuket 2	Chalermpong Saengdee	MFP	PPLE	Incumbent re-elected.	Chalermpong Saengdee	PPLE
SOUTHERN	Phuket 3	Thitikan Thitipruekthikul	MFP	PPLE	Incumbent lost reelection.	Orathai Kerdsub	KT
SOUTHERN	Ranong 1	Kongkrit Chatmaleerat	BJT	BJT	Incumbent re-elected.	Kongkrit Chatmaleerat	BJT
SOUTHERN	Satun 1	Phiboon Ratchakitpakarn	BJT	BJT	Incumbent running for party list candidate.	Pirapat Ratchakitpakarn	BJT
SOUTHERN	Satun 2	Worasit Liangprasit	BJT	BJT	Incumbent re-elected.	Worasit Liangprasit	BJT
SOUTHERN	Songkhla 1	Sanphet Bunyamanee	Dem	BJT	Incumbent re-elected	Sanphet Bunyamanee	BJT
SOUTHERN	Songkhla 2	Sarttra Sripan	PPRP	BJT	Incumbent lost reelection.	Juri Numkaew	Dem
SOUTHERN	Songkhla 3	Somyot Plaidung	Dem	BJT	Incumbent re-elected	Somyot Plaidung	BJT
SOUTHERN	Songkhla 4	Chonnaphat Naksua	PPRP	KT	Incumbent re-elected.	Chonnaphat Naksua	KT
SOUTHERN	Songkhla 5	Dej-is Khaothong	Dem	Dem	Incumbent retiring.	Wongwachara Khaothong	KT
SOUTHERN	Songkhla 6	Suphaporn Kamnerdphol	Dem	Dem	Incumbent retiring.	Anukul Phruksanusak	BJT
SOUTHERN	Songkhla 7	Natchanon Srikokuea	BJT	BJT	Incumbent re-elected.	Natchanon Srikokuea	BJT
SOUTHERN	Songkhla 8	Surin Palarae	Dem	KT	Incumbent re-elected.	Surin Palarae	KT
SOUTHERN	Songkhla 9	Saksit Khaothong	Dem	Dem	Incumbent re-elected.	Saksit Khaothong	Dem
SOUTHERN	Surat Thani 1	Kansinee Opas Rangsan	UTN	BJT	Incumbent re-elected.	Kansinee Opas Rangsan	BJT
SOUTHERN	Surat Thani 2	Pipit Rattanarak	UTN	BJT	Incumbent re-elected.	Pipit Rattanarak	BJT
SOUTHERN	Surat Thani 3	Wachiraporn Kanjana	UTN	TRP	Incumbent re-elected.	Wachiraporn Kanjana	TRP
SOUTHERN	Surat Thani 4	Pansak Boontan	UTN	BJT	Incumbent lost reelection.	Somchart Pradidporn	Dem
SOUTHERN	Surat Thani 5	Paramet Jina	UTN	KT	Incumbent re-elected.	Paramet Jina	KT
SOUTHERN	Surat Thani 6	Pichai Chompupon	BJT	BJT	Incumbent re-elected.	Pichai Chompupon	BJT
SOUTHERN	Surat Thani 7	Thanin Nuanwat	UTN	BJT	Incumbent lost reelection.	Phongsak Jaikaew	KT
SOUTHERN	Trang 1	Thanompong Leekpai	UTN	UTN	Incumbent retiring.	Ekaphon Na Phatthalung	BJT
SOUTHERN	Trang 2	Thawee Suraban	PPRP	BJT	Incumbent re-elected.	Thawee Suraban	BJT
SOUTHERN	Trang 3	Sunutcha Losathapornpipit	Dem	BJT	Incumbent lost reelection.	Kritti Pak-Ichon	Dem
SOUTHERN	Trang 4	Karn Tangpong	Dem	Dem	Incumbent re-elected.	Karn Tangpong	Dem
SOUTHERN	Yala 1	Sulaiman Buenapenae	PCC	PCC	Incumbent re-elected.	Sulaiman Buenapenae	PCC
SOUTHERN	Yala 2	Sugarno Matha	PCC	PCC	Incumbent re-elected.	Sugarno Matha	PCC
SOUTHERN	Yala 3	Abdul-ayee Samang	PCC	PCC	Incumbent re-elected.	Abdul-ayee Samang	PCC
WESTERN	Kanchanaburi 1	Akaranan Kankittinan	PT	PT	Incumbent re-elected.	Akaranan Kankittinan	PT
WESTERN	Kanchanaburi 2	Chusak Mantim	PT	PT	Incumbent lost reelection.	Chukiat Jinapak	BJT
WESTERN	Kanchanaburi 3	Yossawat Mapaisansin	BJT	BJT	Incumbent re-elected.	Yossawat Mapaisansin	BJT
WESTERN	Kanchanaburi 4	Sakda Wichiansilp	PT	BJT	Incumbent lost reelection in district 5.	Wisuda Wichiansilp	PT
WESTERN	Kanchanaburi 5	Phanom Phokaew	PT	PT	Incumbent re-elected.	Phanom Phokaew	PT
WESTERN	Phetchaburi 1	Thiwanrat Angkinan	UTN	BJT	Incumbent re-elected.	Thiwanrat Angkinan	BJT
WESTERN	Phetchaburi 2	Rerk Udee	BJT	BJT	Incumbent re-elected.	Rerk Udee	BJT
WESTERN	Phetchaburi 3	Apichat Kaewkosol	UTN	BJT	Incumbent re-elected.	Apichat Kaewkosol	BJT
WESTERN	Prachuap Khiri Khan 1	Sangkhom Daengchot	BJT	BJT	Incumbent re-elected.	Sangkhom Daengchot	BJT
WESTERN	Prachuap Khiri Khan 2	Chakkapan Piyapornpaiboon	Dem	KT	Incumbent re-elected..	Chakkapan Piyapornpaiboon	KT
WESTERN	Prachuap Khiri Khan 3	Pramual Pongthavaradet	Dem	KT	Incumbent re-elected.	Pramual Pongthavaradet	KT
WESTERN	Ratchaburi 1	Kulvaree Nopamornbodee	UTN	BJT	Incumbent re-elected.	Kulvaree Nopamornbodee	BJT
WESTERN	Ratchaburi 2	Boonying Nitikanchana	PPRP	KT	Incumbent re-elected.	Boonying Nitikanchana	KT
WESTERN	Ratchaburi 3	Jatuporn Kamonphanthip	PPRP	KT	Incumbent re-elected.	Jatuporn Kamonphanthip	KT
WESTERN	Ratchaburi 4	Akradech Wongpituchroj	UTN	BJT	Incumbent re-elected.	Akradech Wongpituchroj	BJT
WESTERN	Ratchaburi 5	Chaithip Kamolpanthip	PPRP	KT	Incumbent lost reelection.	Boonlue Prasertsopar	BJT
WESTERN	Samut Songkhram 1	Arnupap Likitamnuaychai	MFP	PPLE	Incumbent re-elected.	Arnupap Likitamnuaychai	PPLE
WESTERN	Tak 1	Krit Paniam	MFP	PPLE	Incumbent lost reelection.	Thanat Thawikuekulkit	BJT
WESTERN	Tak 2	Ratchaphong Soisuwan	MFP	PPLE	Incumbent lost reelection.	Chingchai Korprabhakit	KT
WESTERN	Tak 3	Pakpoom Boonpramuk	PPRP	KT	Incumbent re-elected.	Pakpoom Boonpramuk	KT

=== Detailed results ===
Results by Constituency - 2026 Thai general election
Constituency		Winning party							Votes (Note: Minor political parties are aggregated under "Other")													
Province	#	1st place	Votes	Share	Margin #	Margin %	2nd place	3rd place	BJT	PPLE	PT	KT	Dem	PPRP	Eco	TRP	UTN	PCC	NOP	TST	Other	Total
Krabi	1	Bhumjaithai	50,493	56.07%	29,939	33.24%	People's	Democrat	50,493	20,554	2,308	0	15,466	400	840	0	0	0	0	0	0	90,061
Krabi	2	Bhumjaithai	42,714	54.07%	21,432	27.13%	Democrat	People's	42,714	9,433	2,694	0	21,282	1,275	828	0	0	0	0	0	813	78,999
Krabi	3	Bhumjaithai	47,516	54.27%	31,722	36.23%	Democrat	Kla Tham	47,516	9,623	1,574	12,557	15,794	0	889	0	0	0	0	0	0	87,553
Bangkok	1	People's	34,167	44.33%	19,354	25.11%	Democrat	Bhumjaithai	14,368	34,167	6,030	0	14,813	80	979	0	2,075	0	1,133	629	2,801	77,075
Bangkok	2	People's	39,499	47.09%	23,240	28.08%	Bhumjaithai	Democrat	15,949	39,499	5,652	737	14,613	306	933	0	1,684	0	844	590	3,067	83,874
Bangkok	3	People's	34,653	45.14%	15,486	20.17%	Democrat	Bhumjaithai	10,331	34,653	6,665	545	19,167	375	1,308	0	1,430	0	156	571	1,574	76,775
Bangkok	4	People's	34,405	44.12%	10,811	13.86%	Democrat	Bhumjaithai	10,778	34,405	4,343	739	23,594	337	857	0	1,050	0	124	418	1,574	77,982
Bangkok	5	People's	47,147	49.86%	23,017	25.35%	Bhumjaithai	Democrat	22,252	45,269	6,674	1,056	10,035	231	987	0	1,741	0	220	507	1,820	90,792
Bangkok	6	People's	43,239	45.81%	22,042	32.20%	Democrat	Bhumjaithai	12,088	43,239	6,380	247	12,848	0	1,679	0	2,468	0	10,856	1,306	3,250	94,391
Bangkok	7	People's	40,962	48.09%	20,166	21.23%	Bhumjaithai	United Thai Nation	12,037	40,962	6,236	863	8,012	1,406	2,062	0	11,163	0	323	700	3,250	85,181
Bangkok	8	People's	45,092	46.60%	29,224	30.20%	Pheu Thai	Bhumjaithai	14,632	45,092	15,868	385	11,399	857	1,352	0	2,266	0	607	1,469	2,828	96,755
Bangkok	9	People's	49,366	51.90%	32,307	33.97%	Bhumjaithai	Democrat	17,059	49,366	9,827	334	11,282	0	1,352	0	3,308	0	254	904	2,828	95,111
Bangkok	10	People's	41,804	45.48%	22,757	24.76%	Pheu Thai	New Opportunity	7,925	41,804	19,047	545	6,372	0	1,437	0	2,012	0	9,440	636	2,695	91,913
Bangkok	11	People's	38,779	40.82%	14,743	14.66%	Pheu Thai	Bhumjaithai	20,498	38,779	24,850	203	3,839	296	996	0	996	0	584	413	3,722	94,993
Bangkok	12	People's	49,925	48.27%	27,164	32.69%	Bhumjaithai	Pheu Thai	16,106	49,925	15,095	945	9,527	4,142	1,770	0	1,776	0	368	1,183	2,602	103,439
Bangkok	13	People's	44,511	49.17%	29,284	32.36%	Bhumjaithai	Democrat	15,227	44,511	10,752	945	11,428	252	1,413	0	1,887	0	438	807	2,602	90,508
Bangkok	14	People's	41,528	44.43%	16,037	17.16%	Bhumjaithai	Pheu Thai	25,491	41,528	10,848	571	8,186	352	1,199	0	1,333	0	291	1,299	2,369	93,467
Bangkok	15	People's	37,321	43.45%	15,798	18.39%	Pheu Thai	Bhumjaithai	12,943	37,321	21,523	664	7,971	459	1,014	0	1,688	0	273	635	1,410	85,901
Bangkok	16	People's	46,021	48.85%	30,597	32.47%	Bhumjaithai	Pheu Thai	15,424	46,021	15,340	824	8,442	467	1,660	0	1,648	0	1,317	747	2,328	94,218
Bangkok	17	People's	28,587	40.08%	12,415	17.41%	Bhumjaithai	Pheu Thai	16,172	28,587	12,311	499	5,611	864	1,382	0	1,604	0	419	773	3,098	71,320
Bangkok	18	People's	34,738	43.31%	14,324	17.86%	Pheu Thai	Bhumjaithai	8,326	34,738	20,414	210	6,654	359	0	0	3,260	0	211	1,732	4,300	80,204
Bangkok	19	People's	42,820	46.45%	25,018	27.13%	Bhumjaithai	Pheu Thai	17,802	42,820	13,271	772	10,234	0	1,607	0	2,415	0	367	924	1,979	92,191
Bangkok	20	People's	34,941	42.64%	7,467	9.11%	Pheu Thai	Bhumjaithai	7,771	34,941	27,474	308	4,139	207	1,221	0	1,229	0	1,483	1,018	2,351	81,935
Bangkok	21	People's	45,951	50.30%	24,796	27.15%	Democrat	Bhumjaithai	10,553	45,951	6,039	1,060	21,155	0	1,296	0	1,153	0	201	495	3,443	91,346
Bangkok	22	People's	42,264	49.40%	24,778	28.96%	Bhumjaithai	Democrat	17,486	42,264	7,036	253	9,244	2,983	1,130	0	1,705	0	182	786	2,489	85,558
Bangkok	23	People's	47,225	46.60%	29,269	28.88%	Bhumjaithai	Democrat	17,592	46,782	9,292	325	10,876	1,660	1,529	0	1,896	0	184	1,004	3,093	94,233
Bangkok	24	People's	46,415	51.94%	31,115	34.82%	Bhumjaithai	Democrat	15,300	46,415	6,401	514	13,371	0	2,509	0	1,758	0	492	819	1,777	89,356
Bangkok	25	People's	37,035	44.03%	15,941	18.95%	Pheu Thai	Bhumjaithai	10,493	37,035	21,904	357	7,071	688	1,335	0	2,493	0	179	581	2,783	84,112
Bangkok	26	People's	44,271	49.17%	27,544	30.59%	Pheu Thai	Bhumjaithai	11,584	44,271	16,727	1,359	8,425	0	1,422	0	1,562	0	124	2,506	2,057	90,037
Bangkok	27	People's	43,046	47.37%	16,060	17.77%	Pheu Thai	Democrat	6,640	43,046	26,986	384	7,490	0	1,422	0	2,202	0	317	524	1,370	90,381
Bangkok	28	People's	47,692	52.09%	21,113	37.72%	Bhumjaithai	Pheu Thai	13,153	47,692	12,310	1,033	7,586	0	2,236	0	1,831	0	688	870	4,161	91,560
Bangkok	29	People's	46,402	48.21%	29,566	30.72%	Pheu Thai	Bhumjaithai	13,062	46,402	16,836	548	8,967	139	2,211	0	1,831	0	373	1,757	4,122	96,248
Bangkok	30	People's	45,992	49.70%	31,699	34.26%	Pheu Thai	Bhumjaithai	11,593	45,992	14,293	456	8,033	389	1,258	0	2,513	0	285	1,072	6,649	92,533
Bangkok	31	People's	44,722	45.41%	29,596	30.05%	Bhumjaithai	Pheu Thai	15,126	44,722	14,455	485	13,012	0	2,889	0	1,888	0	561	1,147	4,691	98,491
Bangkok	32	People's	39,727	46.39%	26,425	30.86%	Bhumjaithai	Democrat	13,302	39,727	10,257	681	11,573	351	1,429	0	3,024	0	497	897	3,893	85,631
Bangkok	33	People's	44,860	47.51%	28,501	30.19%	Democrat	Bhumjaithai	15,046	44,860	7,451	1,506	16,359	0	2,260	0	2,503	0	288	768	3,375	94,416
Kanchanaburi	1	Pheu Thai	38,572	44.93%	11,723	13.66%	People's	Bhumjaithai	9,864	26,849	38,572	976	2,829	0	1,696	0	3,002	0	0	0	2,062	85,850
Kanchanaburi	2	Bhumjaithai	39,327	40.26%	12,299	12.59%	Pheu Thai	People's	39,327	17,797	27,028	8,352	977	299	1,885	0	1,579	0	0	0	436	97,680
Kanchanaburi	3	Bhumjaithai	50,729	47.02%	10,481	9.70%	Pheu Thai	People's	50,759	14,303	40,278	0	821	0	1,280	0	0	0	0	0	509	107,950
Kanchanaburi	4	Bhumjaithai	52,505	63.34%	35,960	43.38%	People's	Pheu Thai	52,505	16,545	9,877	0	2,291	0	1,280	0	0	0	0	0	1,679	82,897
Kanchanaburi	5	Pheu Thai	39,023	47.04%	11,718	14.12%	Bhumjaithai	People's	27,305	13,925	39,023	0	773	713	800	0	0	0	0	0	423	82,962
Kalasin	1	Pheu Thai	35,868	42.83%	14,391	17.18%	People's	Palang Pracharath	3,616	21,477	35,868	554	1,045	16,870	1,513	0	700	0	0	0	2,101	83,744
Kalasin	2	Pheu Thai	43,696	57.25%	25,839	33.86%	People's	Bhumjaithai	7,463	17,857	43,696	1,194	1,154	479	1,815	0	463	0	0	0	165	76,321
Kalasin	3	Kla Tham	27,385	35.09%	12,355	15.83%	Pheu Thai	Palang Pracharath	4,942	11,568	15,030	27,385	1,285	14,358	1,847	0	524	0	0	0	1,094	78,033
Kalasin	4	Pheu Thai	35,782	41.78%	10,595	12.37%	Palang Pracharath	People's	3,939	13,431	35,782	3,930	390	25,187	846	0	768	0	0	0	1,376	85,649
Kalasin	5	Bhumjaithai	48,271	53.78%	25,486	28.39%	Pheu Thai	People's	48,271	12,077	22,785	417	204	0	824	0	391	0	4,019	0	770	89,758
Kalasin	6	Pheu Thai	59,665	65.23%	44,524	48.68%	Bhumjaithai	People's	15,141	13,120	59,665	397	425	1,269	452	0	787	0	0	0	270	91,466
Kamphaeng Phet	1	Kla Tham	45,347	49.88%	12,144	13.36%	People's	Democrat	3,498	33,203	2,650	45,347	4,465	0	1,748	0	0	0	0	0	0	90,911
Kamphaeng Phet	2	Kla Tham	42,302	43.38%	9,372	9.61%	Pheu Thai	People's	2,161	16,681	32,930	42,302	2,108	1,322	0	0	0	0	0	0	0	97,504
Kamphaeng Phet	3	Pheu Thai	33,653	40.07%	3,502	4.17%	Kla Tham	People's	1,979	13,026	33,653	30,151	1,620	1,389	1,157	0	0	0	550	0	469	83,994
Kamphaeng Phet	4	Pheu Thai	38,450	39.98%	14,391	15.92%	Kla Tham	People's	1,888	15,711	38,450	27,423	1,215	373	0	0	0	0	800	0	423	86,283
Khon Kaen	1	People's	35,303	42.53%	11,596	13.97%	Bhumjaithai	Pheu Thai	23,707	35,303	15,596	0	2,719	1,366	1,534	0	1,887	0	0	0	895	83,007
Khon Kaen	2	People's	41,012	38.70%	10,482	10.41%	Kla Tham	Pheu Thai	0	41,012	16,293	26,649	2,172	3,294	3,788	0	1,874	0	0	0	1,217	96,299
Khon Kaen	3	Kla Tham	30,645	36.16%	1,363	1.61%	People's	Pheu Thai	987	29,282	21,030	30,645	2,172	3,294	464	0	482	0	0	0	687	84,748
Khon Kaen	4	Pheu Thai	40,255	44.38%	18,036	19.88%	Kla Tham	People's	1,627	16,325	40,255	22,219	730	3,294	730	0	535	0	0	0	8,281	90,702
Khon Kaen	5	Kla Tham	36,120	44.53%	4,111	5.07%	Pheu Thai	People's	1,685	8,867	32,006	36,120	409	0	619	0	193	0	0	0	1,210	81,109
Khon Kaen	6	Bhumjaithai	43,246	54.66%	23,946	30.27%	Pheu Thai	People's	43,246	14,374	19,300	22,219	717	1,452	730	0	517	0	0	0	310	79,116
Khon Kaen	7	Pheu Thai	32,796	39.41%	11,338	13.62%	Kla Tham	People's	11,266	15,813	32,796	21,458	573	0	0	0	781	0	0	0	520	83,207
Khon Kaen	8	Kla Tham	33,926	37.83%	6,332	7.06%	Pheu Thai	People's	3,842	18,648	27,594	33,926	1,126	0	1,136	0	772	0	0	2,186	453	89,683
Khon Kaen	9	Pheu Thai	42,083	52.78%	8,877	10.95%	Bhumjaithai	People's	20,997	14,272	42,803	33,926	0	122	0	0	0	0	0	397	2,510	81,101
Khon Kaen	10	Bhumjaithai	39,396	47.04%	6,669	7.96%	Pheu Thai	People's	39,396	10,229	32,727	326	475	0	0	0	0	0	0	0	604	83,757
Khon Kaen	11	Bhumjaithai	48,810	63.96%	35,035	45.91%	Pheu Thai	People's	48,810	11,431	13,775	403	836	0	0	0	0	0	0	0	968	76,313
Chanthaburi	1	Bhumjaithai	32,984	32.70%	3,593	3.56%	People's	Pheu Thai	32,984	29,391	23,806	1,736	6,211	0	3,460	0	2,113	0	0	0	1,404	100,867
Chanthaburi	2	Bhumjaithai	39,979	43.55%	15,513	16.90%	People's	Pheu Thai	39,979	24,466	9,940	1,042	4,708	0	4,672	0	0	0	0	0	0	91,807
Chanthaburi	3	Bhumjaithai	31,798	34.88%	5,134	5.63%	Palang Pracharath	People's	31,798	20,697	4,138	2,924	2,830	26,664	0	0	0	0	0	0	2,125	91,176
Chachoengsao	1	Pheu Thai	38,717	40.33%	3,818	3.98%	People's	Bhumjaithai	13,705	34,899	38,717	1,889	5,677	0	0	0	0	0	0	0	1,189	96,004
Chachoengsao	2	Kla Tham	50,833	46.28%	18,722	17.05%	Pheu Thai	People's	3,019	20,063	32,111	50,833	2,082	0	0	0	0	0	0	0	1,000	109,828
Chachoengsao	3	Kla Tham	52,758	56.27%	31,142	33.22%	People's	Pheu Thai	2,003	21,616	14,500	52,758	1,377	570	0	0	0	0	0	0	929	93,753
Chachoengsao	4	Kla Tham	47,969	42.79%	12,712	11.34%	People's	Pheu Thai	4,399	35,257	19,940	47,969	2,514	0	0	0	0	0	0	0	1,968	112,107
Chonburi	1	Bhumjaithai	46,253	47.40%	4,196	4.30%	People's	Democrat	46,253	42,057	2,435	0	2,935	327	1,411	0	1,311	0	0	673	1,968	97,585
Chonburi	2	People's	30,061	38.14%	1,241	1.57%	Bhumjaithai	Democrat	28,820	30,061	3,085	0	14,341	279	1,131	0	0	0	0	673	1,108	78,825
Chonburi	3	Bhumjaithai	42,501	47.07%	5,337	5.91%	People's	Pheu Thai	42,501	37,164	3,641	0	2,967	774	2,055	0	0	0	0	0	1,199	90,301
Chonburi	4	Bhumjaithai	45,751	56.64%	21,538	26.67%	People's	Democrat	45,751	24,213	2,151	0	6,426	987	0	0	0	0	0	0	1,242	80,770
Chonburi	5	Bhumjaithai	52,767	55.25%	27,968	29.28%	People's	Pheu Thai	52,767	24,799	7,729	0	3,766	855	2,846	0	917	0	0	0	1,835	95,514
Chonburi	6	People's	41,248	46.13%	6,388	9.67%	Bhumjaithai	Pheu Thai	34,860	41,248	3,877	910	3,241	374	1,530	0	0	0	0	0	3,083	89,423
Chonburi	7	People's	39,986	48.32%	8,000	13.41%	Bhumjaithai	Pheu Thai	31,986	39,986	3,003	0	2,584	352	2,100	0	1,412	0	0	0	1,331	82,754
Chonburi	8	Bhumjaithai	37,623	43.25%	2,921	3.36%	People's	Pheu Thai	37,623	34,702	4,471	0	3,430	1,086	2,046	0	0	0	0	722	2,914	86,999
Chonburi	9	People's	27,602	44.16%	3,904	6.26%	Bhumjaithai	Pheu Thai	23,698	27,602	5,600	0	2,665	407	0	0	1,157	0	0	0	1,280	62,499
Chonburi	10	People's	27,129	32.90%	3,558	4.31%	Bhumjaithai	Kla Tham	23,571	27,129	3,326	23,062	1,853	336	1,324	0	1,108	0	0	420	328	82,457
Chai Nat	1	Pheu Thai	36,058	44.64%	7,321	9.06%	People's	Democrat	6,221	28,737	36,058	1,284	7,271	1,199	0	0	0	0	0	0	0	80,330
Chai Nat	2	Bhumjaithai	54,585	64.65%	37,652	44.59%	People's	Pheu Thai	54,585	16,933	8,937	463	2,819	747	0	0	0	0	0	0	0	84,434
Chaiyaphum	1	Pheu Thai	40,748	49.89%	16,010	19.60%	People's	Bhumjaithai	6,739	24,738	40,748	4,421	1,155	0	908	0	1,067	0	0	0	1,897	81,673
Chaiyaphum	2	Pheu Thai	54,996	69.33%	40,338	50.85%	People's	Bhumjaithai	3,538	14,658	54,996	0	1,314	0	1,687	0	1,879	0	0	0	1,254	79,326
Chaiyaphum	3	Bhumjaithai	48,116	63.91%	32,805	43.57%	Pheu Thai	People's	48,116	9,366	15,311	0	655	0	1,072	0	969	0	0	0	0	75,289
Chaiyaphum	4	Bhumjaithai	36,907	50.69%	19,593	26.91%	Kla Tham	People's	36,907	9,001	8,255	17,314	315	0	437	0	449	0	0	0	131	72,809
Chaiyaphum	5	Pheu Thai	29,851	34.93%	6,257	7.32%	Bhumjaithai	Kla Tham	23,594	9,294	29,851	14,605	719	233	711	0	448	0	0	0	995	85,450
Chaiyaphum	6	Bhumjaithai	50,655	60.78%	33,737	40.48%	Pheu Thai	People's	50,655	13,155	16,918	0	937	0	586	0	735	0	0	0	360	83,346
Chaiyaphum	7	Kla Tham	40,833	50.08%	17,015	20.87%	Pheu Thai	People's	830	12,570	23,818	40,833	341	886	609	0	402	0	0	0	1,253	81,542
Chumphon	1	Bhumjaithai	45,996	47.79%	11,917	12.38%	Democrat	People's	45,966	13,078	870	0	34,079	1,138	0	0	0	0	0	0	1,116	96,247
Chumphon	2	Bhumjaithai	35,467	35.03%	12,426	12.27%	Kla Tham	Democrat	35,467	10,062	782	23,041	16,287	1,138	0	0	0	0	15,064	0	545	101,248
Chumphon	3	Bhumjaithai	42,913	45.19%	13,323	14.03%	Democrat	New Opportunity	42,913	4,230	1,025	0	29,590	0	909	0	0	0	11,298	0	0	94,965
Chiang Rai	1	Pheu Thai	44,084	44.57%	5,390	5.45%	People's	Kla Tham	3,419	38,694	44,084	8,150	1,020	0	909	0	1,383	0	563	0	1,604	98,917
Chiang Rai	2	Pheu Thai	34,901	39.30%	9,825	11.06%	People's	Kla Tham	2,277	25,076	34,901	23,435	262	0	0	0	1,299	0	0	0	1,061	88,811
Chiang Rai	3	Kla Tham	34,046	37.22%	8,253	9.02%	People's	Pheu Thai	1,856	25,793	25,466	34,046	1,709	931	0	0	1,674	0	0	0	0	91,475
Chiang Rai	4	Kla Tham	34,210	35.94%	4,373	4.59%	Pheu Thai	People's	1,671	25,943	29,837	34,210	1,375	0	0	0	954	0	856	0	349	95,195
Chiang Rai	5	Bhumjaithai	53,198	58.23%	35,693	39.07%	People's	Pheu Thai	53,198	17,505	17,204	0	699	0	0	0	476	0	0	0	2,383	91,365
Chiang Rai	6	Kla Tham	28,526	37.30%	3,690	4.82%	People's	Pheu Thai	0	24,836	19,203	28,526	1,400	509	0	0	1,277	0	0	0	730	76,481
Chiang Rai	7	Kla Tham	33,398	37.51%	8,669	9.74%	Pheu Thai	People's	2,280	21,563	24,729	33,398	1,114	0	646	0	609	0	2,546	0	2,151	89,036
Chiang Mai	1	People's	47,840	51.06%	27,676	29.54%	Pheu Thai	Democrat	6,888	47,840	20,164	3,091	8,513	0	1,390	0	3,033	0	943	0	1,833	93,695
Chiang Mai	2	People's	51,532	50.87%	25,377	25.05%	Pheu Thai	Bhumjaithai	7,197	51,532	26,155	2,350	3,738	3,146	3,812	0	1,557	0	0	0	1,857	101,304
Chiang Mai	3	People's	49,235	49.36%	20,884	20.94%	Pheu Thai	Bhumjaithai	7,296	49,235	28,351	2,335	5,464	0	1,954	0	1,436	0	1,265	0	2,450	99,756
Chiang Mai	4	People's	49,841	47.09%	27,633	26.11%	Pheu Thai	Kla Tham	6,728	49,841	22,208	16,970	3,025	367	1,355	0	1,143	0	0	0	4,406	105,843
Chiang Mai	5	People's	39,120	42.55%	6,531	7.10%	Pheu Thai	Bhumjaithai	9,978	39,120	32,589	1,714	2,178	0	1,311	0	908	0	2,013	0	2,122	91,933
Chiang Mai	6	Kla Tham	33,043	40.51%	6,394	7.84%	People's	Pheu Thai	2,041	26,649	16,016	33,043	1,534	0	1,166	0	0	0	0	0	327	81,574
Chiang Mai	7	Kla Tham	33,492	35.11%	3,603	3.83%	People's	Pheu Thai	3,230	20,275	15,747	33,492	874	14,011	901	0	0	0	0	0	2,248	70,570
Chiang Mai	8	People's	57,851	54.48%	29,705	27.98%	Pheu Thai	Bhumjaithai	5,542	57,851	28,146	3,815	1,065	1,868	1,935	0	0	0	3,352	0	931	106,179
Chiang Mai	9	Kla Tham	43,388	45.10%	19,923	20.17%	People's	Pheu Thai	5,387	23,465	15,550	43,388	6,308	722	557	0	0	0	0	0	821	96,198
Chiang Mai	10	Kla Tham	34,102	42.26%	3,174	3.93%	Pheu Thai	People's	1,251	12,789	30,928	34,102	942	687	0	0	0	0	0	0	0	80,699
Trang	1	Bhumjaithai	35,584	39.31%	1,212	1.34%	Democrat	People's	35,584	16,554	1,105	0	34,372	0	0	0	1,540	0	0	0	1,366	90,521
Trang	2	Bhumjaithai	42,668	44.86%	4,514	4.75%	Democrat	People's	42,668	8,159	747	364	38,154	0	0	0	645	0	0	0	4,184	95,121
Trang	3	Democrat	46,916	53.25%	18,019	20.45%	Bhumjaithai	People's	28,897	9,248	889	0	46,916	0	0	0	569	0	0	0	333	88,101
Trang	4	Democrat	50,809	54.24%	21,106	22.44%	Bhumjaithai	People's	29,793	10,018	548	1,236	50,809	0	0	0	696	0	0	0	333	93,671
Trat	1	Bhumjaithai	66,399	57.45%	38,488	33.30%	People's	Democrat	66,399	27,911	4,716	4,084	7,665	3,857	0	0	0	0	0	944	0	115,576
Tak	1	Bhumjaithai	37,819	39.24%	8,823	9.15%	People's	Pheu Thai	37,819	28,996	17,054	1,916	6,170	0	1,565	0	1,387	0	0	0	1,483	96,390
Tak	2	Kla Tham	25,259	40.98%	6,115	9.92%	Pheu Thai	Democrat	2,278	0	19,144	25,259	11,936	0	1,522	0	1,387	0	0	0	1,501	61,640
Tak	3	Kla Tham	30,644	35.65%	11,887	13.83%	Bhumjaithai	Pheu Thai	18,757	15,052	17,179	30,644	1,484	0	1,393	0	887	0	0	0	558	85,954
Nakhon Nayok	1	Kla Tham	33,707	43.90%	3,885	5.06%	Bhumjaithai	People's	29,822	11,054	0	33,707	908	0	0	0	1,290	0	0	0	0	76,781
Nakhon Nayok	2	Bhumjaithai	34,897	43.19%	5,522	6.83%	Kla Tham	People's	34,897	13,388	0	29,375	1,404	964	0	0	0	0	0	0	769	80,797
Nakhon Pathom	1	Bhumjaithai	57,347	59.78%	29,514	30.77%	People's	Pheu Thai	57,347	27,833	4,422	1,041	1,687	0	1,679	0	1,492	0	0	0	430	95,931
Nakhon Pathom	2	Kla Tham	44,487	50.26%	12,976	14.66%	People's	Bhumjaithai	4,945	31,511	2,896	44,487	2,330	0	1,573	0	0	0	406	0	369	88,517
Nakhon Pathom	3	Bhumjaithai	48,099	57.52%	26,360	31.52%	People's	Pheu Thai	48,099	21,739	6,807	653	2,362	0	1,230	0	0	0	764	0	1,970	83,624
Nakhon Pathom	4	Bhumjaithai	50,366	51.43%	24,487	25.00%	People's	Kla Tham	50,366	25,879	3,798	12,206	2,304	0	1,977	0	0	0	0	0	1,430	97,930
Nakhon Pathom	5	Bhumjaithai	40,896	41.17%	15,840	15.95%	People's	Kla Tham	40,896	25,056	4,088	24,238	1,910	0	1,472	0	1,132	0	275	0	265	99,332
Nakhon Pathom	6	People's	38,535	42.92%	1,565	1.74%	Bhumjaithai	Democrat	36,970	38,535	4,630	1,328	3,781	797	1,818	0	0	0	0	0	1,915	89,774
Nakhon Phanom	1	Bhumjaithai	61,803	65.37%	40,283	42.61%	Pheu Thai	People's	61,803	8,145	21,520	312	140	0	1,388	0	125	0	0	726	378	94,537
Nakhon Phanom	2	Pheu Thai	51,176	59.53%	34,209	39.92%	People's	Bhumjaithai	10,077	16,967	51,176	780	514	0	948	0	708	0	0	0	4,797	85,697
Nakhon Phanom	3	Bhumjaithai	37,426	42.12%	2,350	2.64%	Pheu Thai	People's	37,426	12,026	35,076	486	1,699	0	1,136	0	333	0	0	0	681	88,863
Nakhon Phanom	4	Pheu Thai	41,312	44.82%	6,193	6.72%	Bhumjaithai	People's	35,119	11,444	41,312	274	248	112	620	0	223	0	0	731	2,088	92,181
Nakhon Ratchasima	1	People's	32,534	40.17%	9,099	11.24%	Pheu Thai	Bhumjaithai	14,417	32,534	23,435	552	1,672	757	3,168	0	1,838	0	517	0	2,095	80,985
Nakhon Ratchasima	2	Pheu Thai	39,980	41.34%	838	0.87%	People's	Bhumjaithai	9,871	39,142	39,980	412	1,195	668	3,023	0	0	0	0	0	2,389	96,710
Nakhon Ratchasima	3	People's	37,699	40.70%	299	0.32%	Pheu Thai	Bhumjaithai	7,864	37,699	37,400	1,166	1,992	812	3,174	0	0	0	0	0	2,515	92,622
Nakhon Ratchasima	4	Pheu Thai	34,719	41.18%	8,380	9.94%	People's	Bhumjaithai	15,649	26,339	34,719	745	1,550	0	1,551	0	1,605	0	0	0	2,144	84,302
Nakhon Ratchasima	5	Pheu Thai	38,845	44.32%	7,981	9.11%	Bhumjaithai	People's	30,864	13,546	38,845	595	831	1,171	1,490	0	0	0	0	0	302	87,644
Nakhon Ratchasima	6	Pheu Thai	27,973	34.19%	8,860	10.83%	Bhumjaithai	Kla Tham	19,113	11,687	27,973	17,378	439	2,065	629	0	888	0	0	0	1,639	81,811
Nakhon Ratchasima	7	Pheu Thai	40,238	52.29%	19,009	24.70%	Bhumjaithai	People's	21,229	12,032	40,238	387	897	0	1,483	0	0	0	0	0	702	76,958
Nakhon Ratchasima	8	Pheu Thai	51,840	65.19%	37,093	46.65%	People's	Bhumjaithai	10,250	14,747	51,840	0	1,794	0	1,490	0	0	0	0	0	0	79,521
Nakhon Ratchasima	9	Bhumjaithai	41,235	47.04%	16,612	18.95%	Kla Tham	People's	41,235	14,731	4,320	24,623	570	0	1,150	0	617	0	0	0	409	87,655
Nakhon Ratchasima	10	Bhumjaithai	43,185	41.40%	5,322	5.10%	Pheu Thai	People's	43,185	15,343	37,863	1,050	560	222	1,261	0	0	0	4,424	0	0	104,308
Nakhon Ratchasima	11	Pheu Thai	53,069	62.42%	37,117	43.66%	People's	Bhumjaithai	7,697	15,952	53,069	2,708	1,260	0	3,168	0	0	0	0	0	1,162	85,016
Nakhon Ratchasima	12	Pheu Thai	47,794	55.57%	31,222	36.30%	Bhumjaithai	People's	16,572	16,493	47,794	830	1,229	0	1,527	0	0	0	1,288	0	830	86,006
Nakhon Ratchasima	13	Pheu Thai	28,157	42.34%	2,753	4.14%	People's	Bhumjaithai	5,887	25,404	28,157	0	1,775	1,944	3,028	0	0	0	0	0	310	66,505
Nakhon Ratchasima	14	People's	29,003	39.63%	783	1.07%	Pheu Thai	Bhumjaithai	4,673	28,220	29,003	0	2,064	0	2,150	0	2,079	0	0	0	0	73,189
Nakhon Ratchasima	15	Pheu Thai	37,242	39.12%	10,296	10.82%	Bhumjaithai	Kla Tham	26,946	12,635	37,242	15,641	491	549	1,283	0	0	0	0	0	407	95,199
Nakhon Ratchasima	16	Bhumjaithai	32,139	38.26%	643	0.77%	Pheu Thai	People's	32,139	14,870	31,496	1,215	586	1,095	982	0	0	0	0	0	1,616	83,999
Nakhon Si Thammarat	1	Democrat	39,225	42.81%	9,642	10.52%	Bhumjaithai	People's	29,583	18,769	1,617	0	39,225	1,106	0	0	0	0	0	0	1,324	91,623
Nakhon Si Thammarat	2	Bhumjaithai	45,334	49.43%	24,223	26.14%	Democrat	People's	45,334	11,586	842	6,989	21,111	0	1,077	0	4,157	0	0	0	618	91,714
Nakhon Si Thammarat	3	Democrat	47,554	51.11%	12,012	12.91%	Bhumjaithai	People's	35,542	6,731	0	623	47,554	0	0	0	588	0	1,719	0	288	93,045
Nakhon Si Thammarat	4	Democrat	44,890	46.26%	8,100	8.35%	Kla Tham	People's	3,705	7,531	798	36,790	44,890	0	505	0	0	0	2,539	0	289	97,047
Nakhon Si Thammarat	5	Kla Tham	36,801	36.69%	5,407	5.39%	Bhumjaithai	Democrat	31,394	12,019	857	36,801	17,704	0	384	0	647	0	0	0	488	100,294
Nakhon Si Thammarat	6	Democrat	43,293	43.28%	21,039	21.03%	Kla Tham	Bhumjaithai	21,043	10,065	758	22,254	43,293	0	0	0	958	0	0	0	1,657	100,028
Nakhon Si Thammarat	7	Bhumjaithai	34,684	41.92%	5,771	6.97%	Democrat	People's	34,684	8,965	1,508	0	28,913	0	598	0	1,011	0	3,065	0	0	82,744
Nakhon Si Thammarat	8	Bhumjaithai	54,040	58.20%	31,506	33.93%	Democrat	People's	54,040	12,201	860	0	22,534	1,630	0	0	805	0	0	0	777	92,847
Nakhon Si Thammarat	9	Bhumjaithai	46,473	48.37%	9,937	10.34%	Democrat	People's	46,473	4,610	1,530	0	36,536	578	0	0	1,060	0	0	0	284	96,071
Nakhon Sawan	1	Bhumjaithai	48,861	54.22%	18,176	20.17%	People's	Pheu Thai	48,861	30,685	4,072	784	3,896	0	1,812	0	0	0	0	0	0	90,110
Nakhon Sawan	2	Bhumjaithai	47,296	48.77%	18,672	19.25%	Pheu Thai	People's	47,296	16,325	28,624	576	2,932	0	1,060	0	0	0	0	0	171	96,984
Nakhon Sawan	3	Kla Tham	53,454	58.74%	31,564	34.69%	People's	Pheu Thai	2,482	21,890	7,059	53,454	2,981	0	2,221	0	0	0	0	0	910	90,997
Nakhon Sawan	4	Bhumjaithai	55,825	66.66%	40,941	48.89%	People's	Pheu Thai	55,825	14,884	6,538	0	1,510	0	3,303	0	0	0	0	0	1,718	83,748
Nakhon Sawan	5	Bhumjaithai	63,430	72.71%	47,591	54.56%	People's	Pheu Thai	63,430	15,839	6,481	510	1,677	0	1,041	0	0	0	0	0	250	87,228
Nakhon Sawan	6	Bhumjaithai	36,543	44.28%	4,236	4.97%	Kla Tham	People's	36,543	11,228	2,985	32,307	951	78	643	0	0	0	0	0	123	85,258
Nonthaburi	1	People's	42,123	44.87%	22,262	23.71%	Bhumjaithai	Pheu Thai	19,861	42,123	9,587	8,706	6,573	391	2,230	0	2,034	0	0	0	2,378	93,883
Nonthaburi	2	People's	38,013	46.86%	17,887	22.05%	Bhumjaithai	Pheu Thai	20,126	38,013	10,730	563	5,756	906	1,667	0	1,210	0	0	0	2,152	81,123
Nonthaburi	3	People's	47,405	49.11%	29,657	30.73%	Pheu Thai	Bhumjaithai	15,854	47,405	17,748	1,160	7,291	474	2,207	0	1,873	0	0	0	2,509	96,521
Nonthaburi	4	People's	33,461	39.27%	5,464	6.41%	Bhumjaithai	Pheu Thai	27,997	33,461	14,692	346	4,054	0	1,501	0	1,279	0	0	0	1,873	85,203
Nonthaburi	5	People's	41,888	43.58%	9,903	10.30%	Bhumjaithai	Pheu Thai	31,985	41,888	8,802	1,237	5,854	1,507	1,689	0	2,424	0	0	0	723	96,107
Nonthaburi	6	People's	44,405	44.84%	19,187	19.38%	Bhumjaithai	Pheu Thai	25,218	44,405	17,968	823	6,595	0	1,741	0	0	0	0	0	2,276	99,026
Nonthaburi	7	People's	41,267	43.90%	22,394	23.83%	Kla Tham	Bhumjaithai	13,141	41,267	9,933	18,873	4,932	0	1,683	0	2,686	0	0	0	1,478	93,993
Nonthaburi	8	People's	36,631	41.23%	9,785	11.01%	Bhumjaithai	Pheu Thai	26,846	36,631	9,038	5,349	4,255	852	1,957	0	2,172	0	0	0	1,760	88,860
Narathiwat	1	Kla Tham	40,637	43.31%	5,611	5.98%	Bhumjaithai	People's	35,026	10,071	419	40,637	1,382	0	0	0	1,030	5,260	0	0	0	93,825
Narathiwat	2	Kla Tham	43,594	61.71%	32,205	45.59%	Prachachat	People's	1,348	8,377	1,559	43,594	2,954	1,054	0	0	0	11,389	0	0	360	70,635
Narathiwat	3	Kla Tham	36,480	46.00%	266	0.34%	Bhumjaithai	People's	36,214	4,529	200	36,480	409	0	0	0	0	1,329	0	0	138	79,299
Narathiwat	4	Bhumjaithai	46,262	55.44%	11,231	13.46%	Prachachat	People's	46,262	3,772	274	1,279	717	60	0	0	0	35,031	0	0	45	83,440
Narathiwat	5	Prachachat	47,012	52.96%	13,878	15.63%	Kla Tham	People's	1,689	5,474	441	33,134	1,025	0	0	0	0	47,012	0	0	0	88,775
Nan	1	People's	34,546	36.13%	13,267	13.87%	Kla Tham	Bhumjaithai	15,211	34,546	13,779	21,279	1,985	1,999	987	0	1,357	0	0	0	4,476	95,619
Nan	2	Kla Tham	38,228	42.25%	13,340	14.74%	People's	Pheu Thai	1,982	24,888	14,002	38,228	1,784	2,382	1,250	0	667	0	0	0	953	90,486
Nan	3	People's	26,189	33.05%	10,002	12.62%	Pheu Thai	Kla Tham	6,935	26,189	16,187	11,813	1,560	5,331	0	0	1,279	0	1,338	0	8,627	79,242
Bueng Kan	1	Bhumjaithai	37,182	53.40%	19,650	28.22%	Pheu Thai	People's	37,182	10,986	17,532	2,765	619	0	0	0	231	0	0	0	309	69,624
Bueng Kan	2	Bhumjaithai	26,482	36.74%	6,501	9.02%	Kla Tham	Pheu Thai	26,482	8,486	14,693	19,981	169	497	0	0	929	0	0	0	835	72,072
Bueng Kan	3	Bhumjaithai	34,041	48.61%	18,992	27.12%	People's	Pheu Thai	34,041	15,049	14,313	4,098	697	0	0	0	666	0	0	0	1,189	70,033
Buriram	1	Bhumjaithai	57,074	72.35%	42,079	53.34%	People's	Pheu Thai	57,074	14,995	3,301	490	1,052	0	754	0	722	0	0	0	521	78,889
Buriram	2	Bhumjaithai	56,479	75.25%	45,084	60.07%	People's	Pheu Thai	56,479	11,395	3,555	199	653	0	1,043	0	491	0	0	0	1,240	75,055
Buriram	3	Bhumjaithai	56,210	77.88%	45,580	63.15%	People's	Pheu Thai	56,210	10,630	3,054	459	295	0	0	0	725	0	0	0	802	72,175
Buriram	4	Bhumjaithai	51,136	78.75%	39,869	60.92%	People's	Pheu Thai	51,536	11,667	3,699	336	846	0	678	0	683	0	0	0	0	65,445
Buriram	5	Bhumjaithai	53,732	70.10%	43,038	56.15%	People's	Pheu Thai	53,732	10,694	7,914	194	1,052	0	1,238	0	714	0	0	807	305	76,650
Buriram	6	Bhumjaithai	51,523	70.51%	39,972	54.71%	People's	Pheu Thai	51,523	11,551	5,419	433	1,239	0	851	0	1,211	0	0	237	1,144	73,068
Buriram	7	Bhumjaithai	45,919	61.61%	31,937	42.85%	Pheu Thai	People's	45,919	11,091	13,982	406	621	0	880	0	522	0	0	0	1,116	74,537
Buriram	8	Bhumjaithai	53,217	67.85%	37,850	48.26%	People's	Pheu Thai	53,217	15,367	4,664	584	1,050	0	1,396	0	647	0	0	0	1,530	78,428
Buriram	9	Bhumjaithai	57,197	77.62%	48,502	65.81%	People's	Pheu Thai	57,197	8,695	4,068	152	491	0	1,393	0	887	0	0	0	812	73,695
Buriram	10	Bhumjaithai	52,091	75.30%	42,682	61.96%	People's	Pheu Thai	52,091	9,229	4,221	114	1,489	0	852	0	485	0	0	0	695	69,176
Pathum Thani	1	People's	32,835	34.49%	8,277	8.69%	Pheu Thai	Kla Tham	6,562	32,835	24,558	24,365	3,508	300	1,487	0	1,586	0	0	0	0	95,201
Pathum Thani	2	Pheu Thai	36,340	37.45%	4,761	4.91%	People's	Bhumjaithai	23,496	31,579	36,340	727	1,651	438	1,037	0	991	0	0	0	773	97,032
Pathum Thani	3	People's	42,004	49.91%	19,151	22.76%	Bhumjaithai	Pheu Thai	22,852	42,004	4,637	0	3,891	1,007	3,108	0	1,499	0	0	0	1,155	84,153
Pathum Thani	4	People's	41,039	45.18%	23,527	25.90%	Pheu Thai	Kla Tham	8,216	41,039	17,512	15,222	3,900	1,150	1,903	0	1,495	0	0	0	299	90,836
Pathum Thani	5	People's	35,383	42.88%	22,442	27.20%	Kla Tham	Pheu Thai	10,418	35,383	12,043	12,941	4,424	899	2,063	0	1,539	0	0	0	2,789	82,519
Pathum Thani	6	People's	42,684	50.58%	32,605	38.64%	Pheu Thai	Bhumjaithai	9,739	42,684	10,079	8,530	6,809	564	2,767	0	2,017	0	0	0	1,193	84,382
Pathum Thani	7	Bhumjaithai	46,202	53.68%	18,388	21.36%	People's	Pheu Thai	46,202	27,814	5,324	0	1,538	415	2,488	0	999	0	0	0	1,295	86,075
Pathum Thani	8	Bhumjaithai	42,730	51.27%	16,179	19.41%	People's	Pheu Thai	42,730	26,551	10,865	0	1,978	663	0	0	1,276	0	0	0	1,283	83,346
Prachuap Khiri Khan	1	Bhumjaithai	51,582	45.95%	8,038	7.16%	Kla Tham	People's	51,582	13,063	1,002	43,544	2,477	0	0	0	0	0	0	0	581	112,249
Prachuap Khiri Khan	2	Kla Tham	43,420	45.02%	20,642	21.40%	People's	Bhumjaithai	16,535	22,778	2,240	43,420	4,627	0	0	0	0	0	5,335	322	1,197	96,454
Prachuap Khiri Khan	3	Bhumjaithai	33,978	34.53%	8,534	8.67%	Kla Tham	Democrat	33,978	11,596	796	25,444	13,335	0	0	0	0	0	0	12,135	1,125	98,409
Prachinburi	1	Bhumjaithai	42,309	51.02%	13,760	16.59%	People's	Pheu Thai	42,309	28,549	6,144	2,124	1,661	0	0	0	0	0	1,413	0	723	82,923
Prachinburi	2	Bhumjaithai	44,037	43.84%	10,387	10.34%	People's	Pheu Thai	44,037	33,650	19,584	0	1,441	0	0	0	0	0	0	0	1,838	100,450
Prachinburi	3	Bhumjaithai	45,193	53.58%	20,398	24.18%	People's	Pheu Thai	45,193	24,795	10,575	0	2,724	0	0	0	0	0	0	0	1,060	84,347
Pattani	1	Bhumjaithai	24,377	35.22%	7,962	11.50%	Kla Tham	Prachachat	24,377	10,859	380	16,415	2,718	0	0	0	471	13,994	0	0	0	69,214
Pattani	2	Bhumjaithai	38,541	50.76%	24,459	32.21%	Kla Tham	Prachachat	38,541	7,134	274	14,082	1,975	0	0	0	0	13,920	0	0	0	75,926
Pattani	3	Bhumjaithai	30,337	46.10%	6,084	9.25%	Prachachat	People's	30,337	6,626	646	2,601	1,541	0	0	0	0	24,253	0	0	0	65,804
Pattani	4	Kla Tham	30,170	37.52%	4,239	5.27%	Bhumjaithai	Prachachat	25,931	5,423	347	30,170	1,647	0	0	0	0	16,390	0	0	501	80,409
Pattani	5	Bhumjaithai	34,313	46.83%	10,254	14.00%	Prachachat	People's	34,313	9,283	640	3,250	1,495	228	0	0	0	24,059	0	0	0	73,268
Phra Nakhon Si Ayutthaya	1	Bhumjaithai	46,696	47.87%	9,361	9.60%	People's	Pheu Thai	46,696	37,335	5,895	0	3,557	0	1,556	0	1,512	0	0	0	1,019	97,550
Phra Nakhon Si Ayutthaya	2	Bhumjaithai	53,474	56.65%	27,638	29.28%	People's	Pheu Thai	53,474	25,836	4,030	662	1,144	244	1,953	0	1,356	0	0	0	699	94,398
Phra Nakhon Si Ayutthaya	3	Bhumjaithai	58,072	57.88%	26,089	26.00%	People's	Pheu Thai	58,072	31,983	5,768	0	1,489	0	2,104	0	915	0	0	0	0	100,331
Phra Nakhon Si Ayutthaya	4	Bhumjaithai	51,469	48.14%	19,513	18.25%	People's	New Opportunity	51,469	31,956	5,682	0	1,034	609	1,547	0	1,104	0	13,512	0	0	106,913
Phra Nakhon Si Ayutthaya	5	Bhumjaithai	46,623	47.39%	19,249	19.57%	Pheu Thai	People's	46,623	21,135	27,374	0	1,048	0	795	0	0	0	0	503	905	98,383
Phayao	1	Kla Tham	66,683	72.84%	47,788	52.20%	People's	Pheu Thai	1,228	18,895	2,791	66,683	895	0	0	0	1,053	0	0	0	0	91,545
Phayao	2	Kla Tham	55,400	62.59%	34,904	39.43%	People's	Pheu Thai	1,254	20,496	10,843	55,400	466	259	0	0	0	0	0	0	0	88,518
Phayao	3	Kla Tham	54,470	64.35%	37,520	44.32%	People's	Pheu Thai	979	16,950	11,518	54,470	734	0	0	0	0	0	0	0	0	84,651
Phang Nga	1	Bhumjaithai	36,274	54.67%	20,620	31.08%	Democrat	People's	36,274	9,019	1,227	4,171	15,654	0	0	0	0	0	0	0	0	66,345
Phang Nga	2	Bhumjaithai	26,513	35.12%	3,205	4.24%	Kla Tham	Democrat	26,513	11,249	1,828	23,308	12,604	0	0	0	0	0	0	0	0	75,502
Phatthalung	1	Bhumjaithai	42,209	38.80%	2,336	2.15%	Kla Tham	Democrat	42,209	10,141	536	39,873	15,029	0	194	0	589	0	0	0	217	108,788
Phatthalung	2	Bhumjaithai	58,926	50.33%	23,113	19.74%	Pheu Thai	Democrat	58,926	8,752	35,813	995	11,831	0	0	0	0	0	0	0	762	117,079
Phatthalung	3	Kla Tham	47,653	43.78%	15,759	14.48%	Bhumjaithai	Democrat	31,894	8,864	1,676	47,653	16,493	0	453	0	0	0	0	0	1,816	108,849
Phichit	1	Bhumjaithai	53,293	58.52%	30,121	33.07%	People's	Pheu Thai	53,293	23,172	6,318	3,446	1,395	295	1,560	0	1,590	0	0	0	0	91,069
Phichit	2	Bhumjaithai	46,639	56.07%	26,472	31.83%	People's	Pheu Thai	46,639	20,167	12,757	463	991	0	921	0	1,240	0	0	0	0	83,178
Phichit	3	Bhumjaithai	39,023	41.22%	6,218	6.57%	Kla Tham	People's	39,023	15,026	5,449	32,805	1,048	0	850	0	461	0	0	0	0	94,660
Phitsanulok	1	People's	34,692	38.64%	1,222	1.36%	Pheu Thai	Bhumjaithai	15,241	34,692	33,470	844	2,610	0	2,229	0	0	0	0	0	696	89,782
Phitsanulok	2	Pheu Thai	40,429	45.82%	8,359	9.47%	People's	Bhumjaithai	7,084	32,070	40,429	0	4,705	1,158	2,286	0	0	0	0	0	514	88,242
Phitsanulok	3	Bhumjaithai	42,353	48.24%	20,363	23.19%	Pheu Thai	People's	42,353	18,058	21,990	1,494	2,165	295	1,443	0	0	0	0	0	0	87,798
Phitsanulok	4	Bhumjaithai	42,805	48.24%	18,338	20.67%	Pheu Thai	People's	42,805	14,282	24,467	534	746	0	0	0	731	0	0	0	171	88,736
Phitsanulok	5	Bhumjaithai	34,149	39.17%	4,039	4.63%	Pheu Thai	People's	34,149	19,978	30,110	541	1,745	0	0	0	0	0	0	0	649	87,172
Phetchaburi	1	Bhumjaithai	61,734	68.89%	41,303	46.09%	People's	Democrat	61,734	20,431	1,754	0	5,699	0	0	0	0	0	0	0	0	89,618
Phetchaburi	2	Bhumjaithai	67,251	70.12%	48,162	50.22%	People's	Pheu Thai	67,251	19,089	4,307	0	3,378	0	1,881	0	0	0	0	0	0	95,907
Phetchaburi	3	Bhumjaithai	71,153	74.89%	56,966	59.96%	People's	Kla Tham	71,153	14,187	1,479	3,900	2,660	0	1,626	0	0	0	0	0	0	95,005
Phetchabun	1	Bhumjaithai	50,631	62.79%	28,262	35.05%	People's	Pheu Thai	50,631	22,369	3,334	358	1,714	0	1,568	0	0	0	0	0	659	80,633
Phetchabun	2	Bhumjaithai	41,515	43.46%	1,357	1.42%	Kla Tham	People's	41,515	10,678	1,001	40,158	687	239	673	0	0	0	0	0	580	95,529
Phetchabun	3	Bhumjaithai	39,252	45.90%	20,240	23.67%	Kla Tham	People's	39,252	14,682	3,790	19,012	1,454	239	1,139	0	0	0	0	0	811	85,510
Phetchabun	4	Bhumjaithai	48,590	67.12%	35,296	48.76%	People's	Pheu Thai	48,590	13,294	6,132	385	593	451	1,153	0	0	0	698	0	1,098	72,394
Phetchabun	5	Bhumjaithai	45,747	62.26%	29,069	39.56%	People's	Pheu Thai	45,747	16,678	6,216	0	912	478	2,244	0	1,201	0	0	0	0	73,475
Phetchabun	6	Bhumjaithai	59,008	72.78%	44,705	55.10%	People's	Pheu Thai	59,008	14,303	4,610	301	1,077	0	1,286	0	0	0	0	0	544	81,129
Phrae	1	Bhumjaithai	40,738	44.00%	16,585	17.91%	People's	Kla Tham	40,738	24,153	10,702	15,633	484	0	0	0	871	0	0	0	0	92,581
Phrae	2	Bhumjaithai	54,734	65.72%	40,157	48.22%	People's	Pheu Thai	54,734	14,577	13,030	524	418	0	0	0	0	0	0	0	0	83,283
Phrae	3	People's	23,987	32.60%	2,448	3.33%	Pheu Thai	Bhumjaithai	16,448	23,987	21,539	9,327	774	1,515	0	0	0	0	0	0	0	73,590
Phuket	1	People's	19,558	29.47%	2,683	4.04%	Bhumjaithai	Kla Tham	16,875	19,558	1,187	15,528	11,001	1,052	1,259	0	0	0	0	0	0	66,360
Phuket	2	People's	24,877	39.20%	4,472	7.05%	Bhumjaithai	Democrat	20,405	24,877	2,431	0	13,576	0	2,170	0	0	0	0	0	0	63,459
Phuket	3	Kla Tham	30,360	40.41%	10,083	13.42%	People's	Bhumjaithai	12,339	20,277	1,192	30,360	8,344	0	1,685	0	0	0	0	0	931	75,128
Maha Sarakham	1	Bhumjaithai	32,439	38.45%	9,699	11.42%	People's	Pheu Thai	32,493	22,794	15,504	10,178	1,199	890	718	0	547	0	0	0	593	84,916
Maha Sarakham	2	Bhumjaithai	32,203	40.91%	11,414	14.50%	Pheu Thai	People's	32,203	13,838	20,789	1,009	676	7,792	414	0	464	0	0	0	1,529	78,715
Maha Sarakham	3	Bhumjaithai	39,612	46.72%	4,974	5.87%	Pheu Thai	People's	39,612	8,115	34,638	118	255	0	1,307	0	224	0	0	0	517	84,786
Maha Sarakham	4	Bhumjaithai	30,843	38.23%	9,070	11.24%	Kla Tham	Pheu Thai	30,843	11,621	15,459	21,773	248	133	0	0	318	0	0	0	286	80,681
Maha Sarakham	5	Pheu Thai	36,149	46.57%	16,847	21.71%	People's	Economic	3,545	19,302	36,149	2,185	930	4,627	6,125	0	0	0	0	0	4,755	77,618
Maha Sarakham	6	Bhumjaithai	38,939	44.73%	8,240	9.46%	Pheu Thai	People's	38,939	14,142	30,699	419	611	0	1,626	0	292	0	0	0	330	87,058
Mukdahan	1	Bhumjaithai	31,342	31.66%	7,759	7.84%	Pheu Thai	People's	31,342	21,369	23,583	18,053	927	660	575	0	462	0	0	0	2,014	98,985
Mukdahan	2	Kla Tham	42,393	44.99%	18,931	20.09%	Pheu Thai	People's	7,571	15,648	23,462	42,393	548	4,112	0	0	0	0	0	0	491	94,225
Mae Hong Son	1	Kla Tham	35,870	58.67%	17,190	28.12%	People's	Pheu Thai	0	18,680	3,126	35,870	2,148	0	0	0	1,310	0	0	0	0	61,134
Mae Hong Son	2	Bhumjaithai	24,897	37.05%	529	0.79%	Kla Tham	People's	24,897	13,208	2,197	24,368	998	460	0	0	1,068	0	0	0	0	67,196
Yasothon	1	Bhumjaithai	49,334	48.97%	12,748	12.65%	Pheu Thai	People's	49,334	12,755	36,586	0	1,258	0	417	0	0	0	0	0	393	100,743
Yasothon	2	Bhumjaithai	51,233	56.36%	22,353	24.59%	Pheu Thai	People's	51,233	8,264	28,880	0	152	163	1,031	0	0	0	0	0	1,179	90,902
Yasothon	3	Bhumjaithai	44,970	47.88%	14,797	15.76%	Pheu Thai	People's	44,970	14,424	30,173	2,399	415	615	661	0	0	0	0	0	257	93,914
Yala	1	Prachachat	31,446	34.74%	10,807	11.94%	Kla Tham	Bhumjaithai	16,200	15,216	490	20,639	5,182	213	0	0	0	31,446	0	0	1,136	90,522
Yala	2	Prachachat	46,972	53.60%	22,746	25.95%	Bhumjaithai	People's	24,226	9,570	1,105	1,406	3,060	0	0	0	0	46,972	0	0	1,303	87,642
Yala	3	Prachachat	34,910	40.18%	6,856	10.05%	Kla Tham	People's	3,443	12,123	1,369	26,180	4,072	0	0	0	0	34,910	0	0	4,781	86,878
Roi Et	1	Bhumjaithai	50,238	56.20%	30,116	33.69%	Pheu Thai	People's	50,238	17,557	20,122	0	827	0	0	0	641	0	0	0	0	89,385
Roi Et	2	Kla Tham	43,764	50.32%	20,557	23.64%	Pheu Thai	People's	7,073	11,879	23,207	43,764	228	0	0	0	467	0	0	0	356	86,974
Roi Et	3	Kla Tham	35,999	44.04%	5,880	7.19%	Pheu Thai	People's	1,488	11,879	30,119	35,999	706	620	1,345	0	237	0	0	0	86	81,733
Roi Et	4	Pheu Thai	22,302	27.74%	473	0.59%	Kla Tham	Bhumjaithai	16,270	10,958	22,302	21,829	687	2,030	1,345	0	1,106	0	4,826	0	396	80,424
Roi Et	5	Pheu Thai	43,787	60.78%	29,359	40.75%	People's	Bhumjaithai	9,584	14,428	43,787	1,014	785	469	0	0	766	0	0	0	1,210	72,043
Roi Et	6	Pheu Thai	33,696	44.02%	12,871	16.81%	Bhumjaithai	People's	20,825	11,282	33,696	620	388	5,862	0	0	752	0	0	3,129	0	76,554
Roi Et	7	Thai Sang Thai	44,414	54.62%	14,620	17.98%	Pheu Thai	People's	0	6,138	29,794	0	355	0	408	0	205	0	0	44,414	0	81,314
Roi Et	8	Pheu Thai	26,860	31.44%	1,754	2.05%	Bhumjaithai	Thai Sang Thai	25,106	11,351	26,860	0	264	290	689	0	379	0	0	20,056	438	85,433
Ranong	1	Bhumjaithai	59,363	70.91%	44,929	53.67%	People's	Democrat	59,363	14,434	1,573	913	7,536	0	0	0	0	0	0	0	0	83,719
Rayong	1	People's	36,934	43.41%	9,657	11.35%	Bhumjaithai	Democrat	27,277	36,934	2,917	0	15,357	664	0	0	1,093	0	0	528	451	85,091
Rayong	2	People's	33,687	49.14%	6,809	9.93%	Democrat	Pheu Thai	0	33,687	4,268	0	26,878	0	0	0	0	0	0	1,981	1,737	68,551
Rayong	3	Democrat	26,873	35.15%	2,072	2.71%	People's	United Thai Nation	2,454	24,801	5,580	0	26,873	0	0	0	15,572	0	0	788	395	76,463
Rayong	4	Bhumjaithai	46,134	52.71%	13,638	15.58%	People's	Democrat	46,134	32,496	3,433	317	3,744	0	0	0	1,036	0	0	0	366	87,526
Rayong	5	People's	37,569	46.22%	13,100	16.12%	Bhumjaithai	Democrat	24,469	37,569	5,120	0	6,214	0	0	0	1,672	0	0	1,215	0	81,289
Ratchaburi	1	Bhumjaithai	56,407	57.63%	27,476	28.07%	People's	Pheu Thai	56,407	28,931	7,671	0	1,886	0	1,611	0	1,368	0	0	0	0	97,874
Ratchaburi	2	Kla Tham	43,510	48.41%	16,554	18.42%	People's	Bhumjaithai	6,251	26,956	5,852	43,510	4,524	0	0	0	2,725	0	0	0	0	89,878
Ratchaburi	3	Kla Tham	51,702	53.71%	25,445	26.43%	People's	Bhumjaithai	5,369	26,257	0	51,702	4,192	3,365	0	0	0	0	0	0	5,382	96,267
Ratchaburi	4	Bhumjaithai	55,778	51.85%	29,840	27.74%	People's	Kla Tham	55,778	25,938	3,116	20,627	855	0	639	0	626	0	0	0	0	107,579
Ratchaburi	5	Bhumjaithai	45,150	41.59%	5,237	4.82%	Kla Tham	People's	45,150	18,091	1,810	39,913	1,684	0	631	0	985	0	0	296	0	108,560
Lopburi	1	Bhumjaithai	38,126	38.08%	12,533	12.52%	People's	New Opportunity	38,126	25,593	9,992	1,842	1,571	0	2,172	0	1,498	0	15,617	1,379	659	100,109
Lopburi	2	Bhumjaithai	58,141	52.83%	33,642	30.57%	People's	Pheu Thai	58,141	24,499	21,604	1,842	1,650	833	1,216	0	962	0	0	823	317	110,045
Lopburi	3	Bhumjaithai	49,264	49.65%	25,445	21.93%	Pheu Thai	People's	49,264	15,294	27,504	467	670	2,527	1,816	0	882	0	0	0	801	99,225
Lopburi	4	Pheu Thai	50,031	46.21%	16,293	15.05%	Kla Tham	People's	2,318	18,256	50,031	33,738	1,354	222	1,079	0	1,279	0	0	0	0	108,277
Lampang	1	People's	47,614	48.36%	23,972	24.35%	Pheu Thai	Bhumjaithai	9,189	47,614	23,642	2,314	4,951	0	2,983	0	3,490	0	2,883	0	1,391	98,457
Lampang	2	Kla Tham	35,828	36.42%	2,247	2.28%	People's	Pheu Thai	2,370	33,581	19,485	35,828	3,291	0	2,217	0	0	0	1,065	0	0	98,377
Lampang	3	People's	41,016	40.75%	14,092	14.00%	Kla Tham	Pheu Thai	7,193	41,016	16,581	26,924	1,836	1,360	2,339	0	1,707	0	0	0	1,705	100,661
Lampang	4	Kla Tham	38,171	36.55%	8,515	8.15%	People's	Palang Pracharath	4,107	29,656	13,288	38,171	1,548	16,237	0	0	0	0	0	1,435	0	104,442
Lamphun	1	People's	66,093	52.74%	36,325	28.98%	Pheu Thai	Bhumjaithai	8,919	66,093	29,768	4,395	7,369	0	2,666	0	1,566	0	0	0	4,450	125,326
Lamphun	2	People's	49,316	42.19%	14,257	12.43%	Pheu Thai	Bhumjaithai	11,016	49,316	34,789	2,926	6,259	2,689	5,137	0	2,885	0	1,580	0	282	116,879
Loei	1	Pheu Thai	42,730	50.23%	24,500	28.80%	People's	Kla Tham	4,886	18,230	42,730	14,827	1,763	545	1,201	0	882	0	0	0	0	85,064
Loei	2	Pheu Thai	27,956	38.44%	8,385	11.53%	People's	Palang Pracharath	2,286	19,571	27,956	5,393	1,583	13,478	2,463	0	0	0	0	0	0	72,730
Loei	3	Bhumjaithai	51,525	62.03%	34,024	40.96%	People's	Pheu Thai	51,525	17,501	8,158	1,744	2,273	0	1,032	0	832	0	0	0	0	83,065
Loei	4	Pheu Thai	30,145	40.67%	9,993	13.48%	People's	Palang Pracharath	3,437	20,152	30,145	3,414	3,953	7,328	2,065	0	0	0	3,624	0	0	74,118
Sisaket	1	Bhumjaithai	53,220	56.22%	27,819	29.39%	Pheu Thai	People's	53,220	13,456	25,401	222	460	0	438	0	207	0	0	0	1,262	94,666
Sisaket	2	Bhumjaithai	35,712	44.24%	5,609	6.95%	Pheu Thai	People's	35,712	10,448	30,103	1,166	287	0	868	0	0	0	0	0	2,137	80,721
Sisaket	3	Bhumjaithai	51,942	67.82%	42,746	55.81%	People's	Pheu Thai	51,942	9,196	8,230	1,059	1,041	2,931	1,611	0	0	0	0	0	235	76,586
Sisaket	4	Bhumjaithai	43,534	55.91%	23,344	29.98%	Kla Tham	People's	43,534	8,100	3,428	20,190	293	96	969	0	789	0	0	0	465	77,864
Sisaket	5	Bhumjaithai	39,108	49.09%	13,353	16.76%	Pheu Thai	People's	39,108	11,077	25,755	619	652	0	1,091	0	395	0	0	0	974	79,671
Sisaket	6	Pheu Thai	31,345	39.65%	273	0.35%	Bhumjaithai	People's	31,072	13,132	31,345	502	435	0	1,724	0	415	0	0	0	438	79,063
Sisaket	7	Pheu Thai	36,190	46.03%	4,548	5.78%	Bhumjaithai	People's	31,642	9,181	36,190	263	441	544	0	0	0	0	0	0	370	78,631
Sisaket	8	Bhumjaithai	59,873	71.13%	47,605	56.55%	People's	Pheu Thai	59,873	12,268	10,201	415	334	0	503	0	0	0	0	0	581	84,175
Sisaket	9	Bhumjaithai	39,667	44.79%	20,276	22.89%	Pheu Thai	People's	39,667	14,525	19,391	12,281	368	1,069	555	0	359	0	0	0	351	88,566
Sakon Nakhon	1	Kla Tham	27,337	30.34%	3,903	4.33%	Bhumjaithai	People's	23,434	18,843	16,905	27,337	763	98	1,092	0	766	0	0	0	852	90,090
Sakon Nakhon	2	Kla Tham	25,737	30.65%	5,648	6.73%	Bhumjaithai	Pheu Thai	20,089	15,466	19,074	25,737	279	0	633	0	589	0	1,298	0	0	83,880
Sakon Nakhon	3	Pheu Thai	48,088	61.28%	34,714	44.24%	People's	Bhumjaithai	8,568	13,374	48,088	908	771	0	1,010	0	968	0	4,783	0	0	78,470
Sakon Nakhon	4	Pheu Thai	29,887	39.38%	13,244	17.45%	United Thai Nation	People's	2,615	15,488	29,887	5,463	830	0	3,412	0	16,643	0	0	0	1,565	75,903
Sakon Nakhon	5	Kla Tham	27,906	35.03%	5,852	7.35%	Bhumjaithai	Pheu Thai	22,054	12,318	15,164	27,906	221	0	1,177	0	387	0	0	0	76	79,654
Sakon Nakhon	6	Bhumjaithai	34,892	46.48%	11,791	15.71%	Pheu Thai	People's	34,892	14,243	23,101	353	534	231	884	0	824	0	0	0	0	75,062
Sakon Nakhon	7	Pheu Thai	23,571	32.81%	6,426	8.95%	People's	Kla Tham	9,433	17,145	23,571	16,794	1,058	711	2,359	0	0	0	0	0	759	71,830
Songkhla	1	Bhumjaithai	44,252	50.89%	23,051	26.51%	Democrat	People's	44,252	19,158	1,072	0	21,201	0	921	0	0	0	0	0	351	86,955
Songkhla	2	Democrat	32,205	40.94%	9,917	12.61%	People's	Bhumjaithai	18,935	22,288	695	545	32,205	83	3,133	0	450	0	0	0	329	78,663
Songkhla	3	Bhumjaithai	36,656	39.34%	9,654	10.36%	Democrat	People's	36,656	25,124	973	921	27,002	0	0	0	2,500	0	0	0	0	93,176
Songkhla	4	Kla Tham	45,863	47.85%	21,251	22.17%	Bhumjaithai	Democrat	24,612	5,868	492	45,863	18,187	0	338	0	494	0	0	0	0	95,854
Songkhla	5	Kla Tham	51,130	54.50%	25,740	27.44%	Democrat	People's	2,558	11,192	2,233	51,130	25,390	0	1,305	0	0	0	0	0	0	93,808
Songkhla	6	Bhumjaithai	48,391	54.40%	22,640	25.45%	Kla Tham	People's	48,391	9,865	705	25,751	3,568	0	0	0	394	0	0	0	286	88,960
Songkhla	7	Bhumjaithai	36,128	38.80%	9,859	10.59%	Kla Tham	Democrat	36,128	8,005	350	26,269	19,025	0	235	0	414	2,694	0	0	0	93,120
Songkhla	8	Kla Tham	42,932	46.04%	7,324	7.44%	Bhumjaithai	People's	36,216	6,707	447	43,540	6,217	207	0	0	240	995	0	0	0	94,569
Songkhla	9	Democrat	49,475	49.24%	19,760	19.66%	Bhumjaithai	People's	29,715	18,986	763	672	49,475	0	0	0	875	0	0	0	0	100,486
Satun	1	Bhumjaithai	38,100	46.86%	20,849	25.64%	Kla Tham	People's	38,100	17,149	1,582	17,251	6,235	0	0	0	459	0	0	0	532	81,311
Satun	2	Bhumjaithai	56,595	62.50%	40,648	44.89%	People's	Democrat	56,595	15,947	3,272	917	11,416	0	0	0	1,388	0	0	0	1,020	90,555
Samut Prakan	1	People's	43,463	49.46%	19,313	21.98%	Pheu Thai	Bhumjaithai	12,409	43,463	24,150	805	3,159	1,065	2,066	0	0	0	0	0	762	87,879
Samut Prakan	2	People's	43,435	45.76%	11,531	12.94%	Pheu Thai	Bhumjaithai	7,905	40,979	29,448	559	2,957	668	2,135	0	2,506	0	0	0	1,978	89,135
Samut Prakan	3	People's	45,335	51.23%	32,059	36.23%	Democrat	Bhumjaithai	11,651	45,335	11,151	1,755	13,276	1,328	1,565	0	0	0	0	0	2,427	88,488
Samut Prakan	4	People's	48,876	52.77%	33,400	36.06%	Pheu Thai	Bhumjaithai	15,300	48,876	15,476	686	5,904	1,102	0	0	1,717	0	1,977	0	1,592	92,620
Samut Prakan	5	People's	57,198	57.06%	42,052	41.95%	Bhumjaithai	Pheu Thai	15,146	57,198	12,323	796	4,717	2,410	0	0	2,237	0	1,306	0	4,112	100,245
Samut Prakan	6	Bhumjaithai	35,571	42.09%	2,553	3.02%	People's	Pheu Thai	35,571	33,018	8,020	286	2,246	889	0	0	1,932	0	0	0	2,552	84,514
Samut Prakan	7	People's	46,394	47.49%	17,472	17.88%	Bhumjaithai	Pheu Thai	28,922	46,394	15,568	796	1,780	714	2,645	0	0	0	0	0	2,552	97,691
Samut Prakan	8	People's	40,230	39.04%	12,239	11.88%	Pheu Thai	Kla Tham	7,684	40,230	27,991	16,678	3,068	2,271	2,464	0	0	0	0	0	2,565	103,041
Samut Songkhram	1	People's	39,492	38.74%	20,929	18.43%	Kla Tham	Democrat	6,657	39,492	12,747	28,382	13,741	0	0	0	0	0	0	0	919	101,938
Samut Sakhon	1	People's	32,553	40.20%	9,487	11.72%	Democrat	Bhumjaithai	11,469	32,553	6,922	2,440	23,066	967	1,594	0	1,008	0	0	951	0	80,970
Samut Sakhon	2	Bhumjaithai	34,749	44.52%	5,376	6.89%	People's	Pheu Thai	34,749	29,373	5,084	2,364	2,395	286	1,978	0	0	0	0	1,821	0	78,050
Samut Sakhon	3	People's	30,787	41.21%	4,723	6.32%	Kla Tham	Bhumjaithai	7,342	30,787	6,123	26,064	2,839	0	1,549	0	0	0	0	0	0	74,704
Samut Sakhon	4	Bhumjaithai	42,758	54.59%	19,932	25.45%	People's	Pheu Thai	42,758	22,826	4,776	2,709	1,745	642	1,330	0	0	0	543	0	343	78,327
Sa Kaeo	1	Palang Pracharath	56,083	41.67%	18,265	18.04%	People's	Thai Kao Mai	2,751	19,172	2,510	731	2,661	56,083	2,489	0	0	0	0	0	3,216	89,613
Sa Kaeo	2	Palang Pracharath	60,370	67.56%	43,027	48.16%	People's	Economic	1,823	17,343	2,986	533	1,835	60,370	3,362	0	0	0	0	0	1,099	89,351
Sa Kaeo	3	Kla Tham	38,812	41.79%	5,964	6.42%	Pheu Thai	People's	2,324	13,842	32,848	38,812	1,937	0	2,378	0	0	0	0	0	727	92,868
Saraburi	1	Bhumjaithai	31,958	36.29%	871	0.99%	People's	Pheu Thai	31,958	31,087	14,572	1,106	2,737	1,072	2,942	0	1,156	0	0	0	1,423	88,053
Saraburi	2	Bhumjaithai	37,225	37.55%	9,420	9.50%	Pheu Thai	People's	37,225	25,187	27,805	0	1,094	0	1,836	0	1,782	0	0	0	4,217	99,146
Saraburi	3	Bhumjaithai	53,967	59.01%	25,136	27.49%	People's	Pheu Thai	53,967	28,831	4,647	515	1,230	0	0	0	1,247	0	0	0	1,014	91,451
Saraburi	4	Kla Tham	48,159	53.47%	20,040	22.25%	People's	Bhumjaithai	5,163	28,119	3,452	48,159	2,402	0	1,950	0	0	0	0	0	822	90,067
Sing Buri	1	Bhumjaithai	65,555	57.15%	33,691	29.37%	People's	Pheu Thai	65,555	31,864	13,763	966	1,523	1,037	0	0	0	0	0	0	0	114,708
Sukhothai	1	Pheu Thai	30,925	41.42%	6,830	9.15%	People's	Democrat	2,461	24,095	30,925	1,247	8,465	5,494	1,395	0	576	0	0	0	0	74,658
Sukhothai	2	Pheu Thai	32,650	45.85%	13,385	18.80%	People's	Democrat	1,574	19,265	32,650	2,282	13,824	0	873	0	516	0	0	0	0	71,207
Sukhothai	3	Pheu Thai	47,416	64.68%	32,389	44.18%	People's	Bhumjaithai	4,303	15,027	47,416	2,455	1,572	0	1,425	0	1,112	0	0	0	0	73,310
Sukhothai	4	Bhumjaithai	48,293	58.34%	28,248	34.12%	Pheu Thai	People's	48,293	12,143	20,045	880	495	0	740	0	0	0	0	0	184	82,780
Suphan Buri	1	Bhumjaithai	63,205	66.79%	39,702	41.95%	People's	Pheu Thai	63,205	23,503	4,083	800	1,175	388	0	0	0	0	0	484	996	94,634
Suphan Buri	2	Bhumjaithai	45,297	53.62%	22,020	26.06%	People's	Kla Tham	45,297	23,277	4,069	9,044	1,010	0	1,147	0	0	0	0	0	639	84,483
Suphan Buri	3	Kla Tham	45,213	46.39%	6,941	7.14%	Bhumjaithai	People's	38,182	11,526	1,437	45,213	737	0	0	0	0	0	0	0	257	97,262
Suphan Buri	4	Bhumjaithai	58,049	63.79%	39,077	42.96%	Palang Pracharath	Pheu Thai	58,049	18,972	5,311	2,547	1,556	1,648	1,254	0	0	0	1,659	0	0	90,966
Suphan Buri	5	Bhumjaithai	60,036	60.93%	35,220	35.74%	People's	Pheu Thai	60,036	24,816	10,849	0	1,103	0	0	0	0	0	0	976	759	98,539
Surat Thani	1	Bhumjaithai	27,647	36.25%	4,464	5.85%	People's	Democrat	27,647	23,183	926	0	18,486	3,539	884	0	817	0	0	0	776	76,258
Surat Thani	2	Bhumjaithai	27,071	33.25%	7,012	8.61%	Thai Ruam Palang	Democrat	27,071	12,739	1,012	3,138	15,126	0	0	20,059	470	0	1,695	0	109	81,419
Surat Thani	3	Thai Ruam Palang	39,958	45.05%	15,434	17.40%	Kla Tham	Democrat	1,469	8,099	955	24,524	13,684	0	0	39,958	0	0	0	0	0	88,689
Surat Thani	4	Democrat	43,384	45.94%	15,267	16.17%	Bhumjaithai	Thai Ruam Palang	28,117	8,917	537	0	43,384	208	0	12,672	608	0	0	0	0	94,443
Surat Thani	5	Kla Tham	30,967	34.88%	3,104	3.50%	Thai Ruam Palang	Democrat	1,692	8,754	676	30,967	18,244	111	0	27,863	0	0	0	0	475	88,782
Surat Thani	6	Bhumjaithai	31,707	32.31%	1,275	1.30%	Kla Tham	Democrat	31,707	5,787	595	30,432	15,700	0	0	13,810	0	0	0	0	116	98,147
Surat Thani	7	Kla Tham	40,358	43.87%	10,277	11.17%	Bhumjaithai	Democrat	30,081	9,372	481	40,358	10,297	0	0	0	727	0	0	0	689	92,005
Surin	1	Bhumjaithai	46,167	53.69%	23,063	26.82%	People's	Pheu Thai	46,167	23,104	9,423	2,528	1,312	650	1,813	0	984	0	0	0	0	85,981
Surin	2	Bhumjaithai	53,228	59.52%	36,159	40.43%	Pheu Thai	People's	53,228	14,307	17,069	613	970	463	1,114	0	1,064	0	0	0	605	89,433
Surin	3	Bhumjaithai	50,333	63.20%	35,507	44.58%	Pheu Thai	People's	50,333	14,826	10,467	308	413	1,002	971	0	326	0	0	0	993	79,639
Surin	4	Bhumjaithai	44,913	55.77%	30,241	37.55%	Pheu Thai	People's	44,913	14,535	14,672	1,877	740	1,118	913	0	399	0	0	0	1,363	80,530
Surin	5	Bhumjaithai	41,671	52.45%	23,873	30.05%	Kla Tham	People's	41,671	11,277	6,095	17,798	302	0	476	0	173	0	0	0	1,652	79,444
Surin	6	Bhumjaithai	52,005	67.94%	41,050	53.63%	People's	Pheu Thai	52,005	10,955	9,122	1,024	791	0	1,211	0	479	0	0	0	963	76,550
Surin	7	Bhumjaithai	43,239	50.97%	18,765	22.12%	Pheu Thai	People's	43,239	13,352	24,474	768	735	0	1,844	0	0	0	0	0	428	84,840
Surin	8	Bhumjaithai	52,673	66.74%	37,371	47.35%	People's	Pheu Thai	52,673	15,302	5,899	1,007	408	0	2,794	0	521	0	0	0	315	78,919
Nong Khai	1	Palang Pracharath	30,866	34.69%	6,268	7.05%	Bhumjaithai	People's	24,598	18,311	12,381	362	505	30,866	1,768	0	0	0	0	0	176	88,967
Nong Khai	2	Palang Pracharath	30,322	37.33%	3,899	4.80%	Bhumjaithai	Pheu Thai	26,423	9,782	13,883	0	397	30,322	0	0	0	0	0	0	411	81,218
Nong Khai	3	Bhumjaithai	36,917	47.22%	16,929	21.65%	Pheu Thai	People's	36,917	19,381	19,988	0	1,343	0	0	0	0	0	0	0	547	78,176
Nong Bua Lamphu	1	Kla Tham	31,594	36.39%	9,873	11.37%	Bhumjaithai	People's	21,721	16,253	12,987	31,594	351	1,303	1,154	0	494	0	0	0	955	86,812
Nong Bua Lamphu	2	Pheu Thai	36,663	46.13%	20,601	25.92%	Kla Tham	People's	7,705	14,496	36,663	16,062	795	832	1,823	0	246	0	0	0	860	79,482
Nong Bua Lamphu	3	Kla Tham	26,322	33.80%	2,652	3.41%	Bhumjaithai	People's	23,670	12,279	11,265	26,322	486	0	1,383	0	224	0	0	2,078	158	77,865
Ang Thong	1	Bhumjaithai	56,130	70.36%	38,220	47.91%	People's	Pheu Thai	56,130	17,910	4,270	366	795	304	0	0	0	0	0	0	0	79,775
Ang Thong	2	Bhumjaithai	60,611	75.92%	46,735	58.54%	People's	Pheu Thai	60,611	13,876	4,149	0	1,202	0	0	0	0	0	0	0	0	79,838
Amnat Charoen	1	Bhumjaithai	44,199	48.56%	23,159	25.44%	Pheu Thai	People's	44,199	18,851	21,040	0	1,938	1,072	1,927	0	0	0	0	0	1,997	91,024
Amnat Charoen	2	Bhumjaithai	43,016	45.83%	23,698	25.54%	Pheu Thai	People's	43,016	17,340	19,048	12,398	1,671	0	0	0	0	0	0	0	389	93,862
Udon Thani	1	People's	30,558	39.97%	1,518	1.99%	Pheu Thai	Bhumjaithai	8,196	30,558	29,040	869	2,035	284	1,877	0	1,949	0	0	0	1,648	76,456
Udon Thani	2	Pheu Thai	29,377	47.19%	5,013	6.07%	Bhumjaithai	People's	24,364	21,067	29,377	1,467	874	399	1,696	0	850	0	0	0	2,460	82,554
Udon Thani	3	Bhumjaithai	33,013	43.55%	5,671	7.48%	Pheu Thai	People's	33,013	12,181	27,342	0	219	1,594	627	0	369	0	0	0	463	75,808
Udon Thani	4	Pheu Thai	29,757	41.98%	7,396	10.44%	Bhumjaithai	People's	22,361	14,216	29,757	269	258	352	0	0	658	0	0	0	3,005	70,876
Udon Thani	5	Bhumjaithai	28,475	40.94%	8,229	11.83%	Pheu Thai	People's	28,475	15,354	20,246	1,598	562	436	2,225	0	296	0	0	0	356	69,548
Udon Thani	6	Bhumjaithai	36,722	47.44%	21,546	27.84%	Kla Tham	Pheu Thai	36,722	10,595	12,386	15,176	341	0	1,487	0	487	0	0	0	211	77,405
Udon Thani	7	People's	28,786	40.53%	882	1.24%	Pheu Thai	Thai Sang Thai	3,180	28,786	27,904	843	1,003	2,408	1,637	0	750	0	0	3,925	589	71,025
Udon Thani	8	Bhumjaithai	38,137	53.66%	24,236	34.10%	People's	Pheu Thai	38,137	13,901	12,512	1,842	836	399	1,856	0	238	0	0	0	1,345	71,066
Udon Thani	9	Pheu Thai	29,522	40.21%	8,680	11.82%	Kla Tham	People's	3,584	17,300	29,522	20,842	805	268	0	0	773	0	0	0	333	73,427
Udon Thani	10	Pheu Thai	31,589	43.68%	11,898	16.45%	Bhumjaithai	People's	19,691	17,920	31,589	276	0	0	2,277	0	564	0	0	0	333	72,317
Uttaradit	1	Bhumjaithai	37,418	46.46%	16,592	20.60%	Pheu Thai	People's	37,418	20,371	20,826	289	893	0	0	0	749	0	0	0	0	80,546
Uttaradit	2	New Opportunity	31,560	42.08%	12,644	16.86%	Pheu Thai	People's	5,021	15,595	18,916	1,137	1,346	0	0	0	554	0	31,560	0	863	74,992
Uttaradit	3	Pheu Thai	40,926	54.65%	19,914	26.59%	People's	Bhumjaithai	7,144	21,012	40,926	1,064	3,057	0	0	0	1,211	0	0	0	468	74,882
Uthai Thani	1	Bhumjaithai	56,483	73.81%	43,424	56.75%	People's	Pheu Thai	56,483	13,059	4,515	0	2,467	0	0	0	0	0	0	0	0	76,524
Uthai Thani	2	Bhumjaithai	54,284	70.07%	45,222	58.37%	People's	Pheu Thai	54,284	9,062	8,033	213	5,878	0	0	0	0	0	0	0	0	77,470
Ubon Ratchathani	1	Pheu Thai	32,328	36.74%	5,014	5.70%	People's	Democrat	7,327	27,314	32,328	1,098	9,184	588	2,283	0	0	0	0	7,869	0	87,991
Ubon Ratchathani	2	Thai Ruam Palang	36,198	39.69%	2,400	2.63%	Kla Tham	People's	2,181	12,852	3,566	33,798	677	385	1,006	36,198	0	0	0	0	543	91,206
Ubon Ratchathani	3	Thai Ruam Palang	43,632	50.68%	20,834	24.20%	Pheu Thai	People's	3,409	13,634	22,798	0	554	0	0	43,632	625	0	0	0	1,445	86,097
Ubon Ratchathani	4	Pheu Thai	37,794	37.50%	9,151	9.08%	Kla Tham	People's	0	27,899	37,794	28,643	2,051	1,195	0	0	0	0	0	1,276	1,923	100,779
Ubon Ratchathani	5	Bhumjaithai	52,151	64.39%	37,100	45.81%	People's	Kla Tham	52,151	15,051	3,120	8,636	1,082	661	0	0	0	0	0	0	290	80,991
Ubon Ratchathani	6	Pheu Thai	33,345	42.67%	1,458	1.87%	Thai Ruam Palang	People's	2,663	9,341	33,345	0	437	0	0	31,887	0	0	0	0	471	78,144
Ubon Ratchathani	7	Bhumjaithai	45,003	51.72%	10,186	11.71%	Pheu Thai	People's	45,003	6,036	34,817	0	618	176	0	0	0	0	0	0	364	87,014
Ubon Ratchathani	8	Bhumjaithai	36,651	42.05%	3,567	4.09%	Thai Ruam Palang	People's	36,651	11,800	2,674	0	612	0	1,522	33,084	381	0	0	0	432	87,156
Ubon Ratchathani	9	Thai Ruam Palang	42,832	54.58%	27,436	34.96%	Kla Tham	People's	1,576	6,786	11,382	15,396	369	129	0	42,832	0	0	0	0	0	78,470
Ubon Ratchathani	10	Thai Ruam Palang	66,909	78.20%	59,415	69.45%	People's	Pheu Thai	3,026	7,494	6,973	0	612	542	0	66,909	0	0	0	0	0	85,556
Ubon Ratchathani	11	Bhumjaithai	58,379	72.94%	46,511	58.12%	People's	Pheu Thai	58,379	11,868	4,521	746	781	0	0	0	1,047	0	0	2,690	0	80,032
