= 2019 Thai House of Representatives =

Legislative chamber of Thailand, 2019–2023

25th House of Representatives
←	24th	26th	→
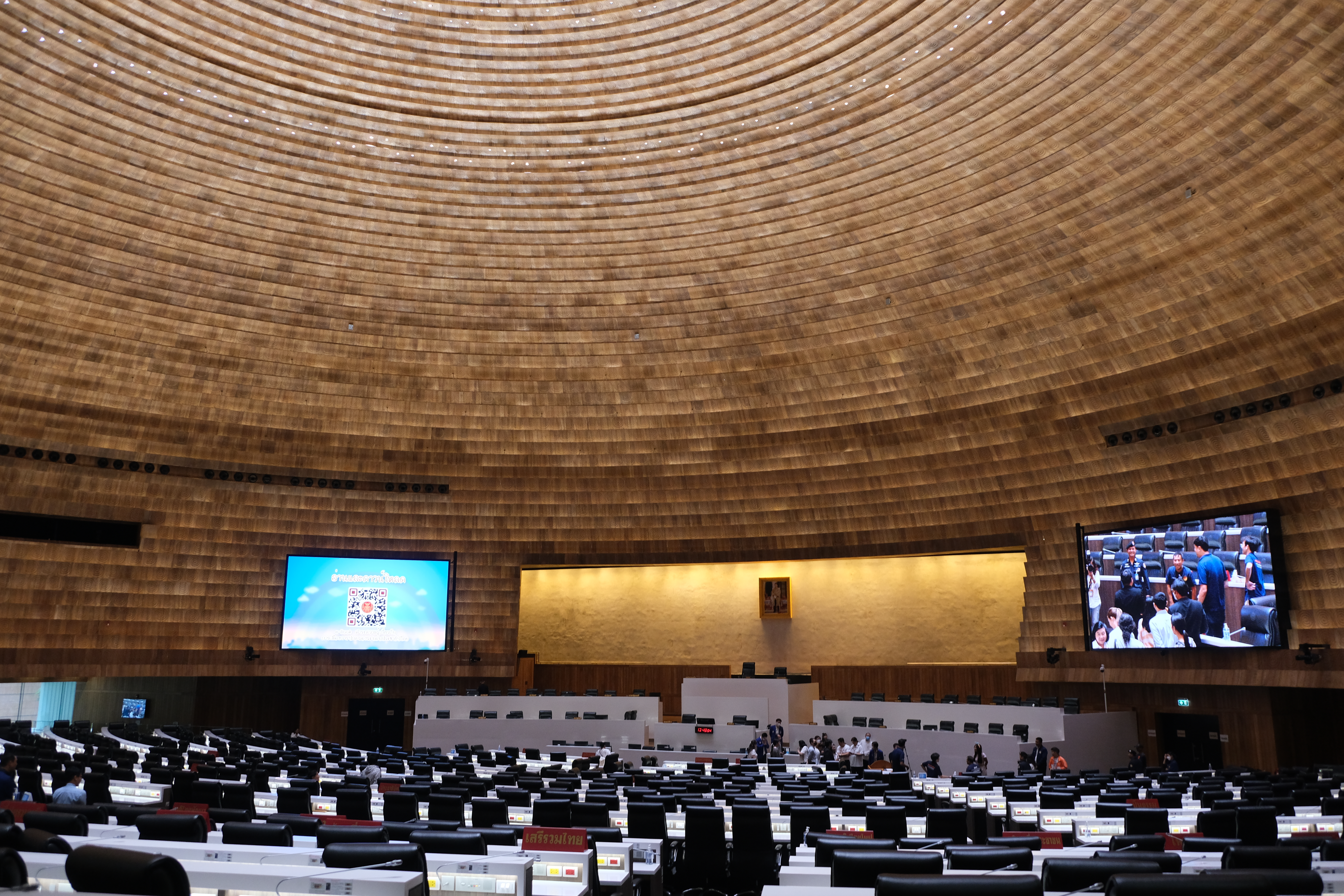
- Phra Suriyan Chamber, Sappaya-Sapasathan

Overview
- Jurisdiction: Thailand
- Meeting place: Sappaya-Sapasathan
- Term: 24 March 2019 – 20 March 2023
- Election: 2019 Thai general election
- Government: Second Prayut cabinet
- Opposition: Pheu Thai Party and 6 opposition parties

House of Representatives
- Members: 500
- Speaker: Chuan Leekpai
- First Deputy Speaker: Suchart Tancharoen
- Second Deputy Speaker: Suphachai Phosu
- Prime Minister: Prayut Chan-o-cha
- Leader of the Opposition: Chonlanan Srikaew
- Party control: Palang Pracharath Party

Sessions
- 1st: 24 May 2019 – 19 September 2019
- 2nd: 1 November 2019 – 28 February 2020
- 3rd: 22 May 2020 – 24 September 2020
- 4th: 1 November 2020 – 28 February 2021
- 5th: 22 May 2021 – 18 September 2021
- 6th: 1 November 2021 – 28 February 2022
- 7th: 22 May 2022 – 19 September 2022
- 8th: 2 November 2022 – 28 February 2023

Special sessions
- 1st: 17 October 2019 – 21 October 2019
- 2nd: 26 October 2020 – 27 October 2020
- 3rd: 17 March 2021 – 18 March 2021
- 4th: 7 April 2021 – 8 April 2021

The House of Representatives of Thailand of 2019 consists of 500 members elected in the 24 March 2019 general election, who, together with 250 members of the appointed Senate, form the National Assembly of Thailand. It is the first parliament convened in accordance with the 2017 constitution, which followed the 2014 military coup. Its lower house was the first since the coup to be elected, while the Senate was appointed by the National Council for Peace and Order, the military junta that came to power in the coup.

Parliament was officially opened by King Maha Vajiralongkorn on 24 May 2019. Former prime minister Chuan Leekpai was elected Speaker of the House of Representatives in its first session on 25 May. The National Assembly then convened on 5 June to vote for prime minister, in which incumbent prime minister and coup leader Prayut Chan-o-cha won over Future Forward Party leader Thanathorn Juangroongruangkit.

== Composition ==
Party	Members	
Party	Elected	At the end of term
Pheu Thai	136	118
Palang Pracharath	115	73
Bhumjaithai	51	63
Democrat	52	48
Move Forward	-	44
Chart Thai Pattana	10	11
Thai Liberal	10	10
Prachachat	7	7
New Economics	6	6
For the Nation	5	6
Thai Local Power	3	5
Action Coalition	5	4
Chart Pattana Kla	3	3
United Thai Nation	-	3
Thai Forest Conservation	2	2
Thai People Power	1	1
Thailand Together	1	1
People Progressive	1	1
Thai Civilized	1	1
Thai Teachers for People	1	1
New Democracy	1	1
New Palangdharma	1	1
Future Forward	80	-
Thai Economic	-	-
Tairaktham	1	-
Prachatumthai	1	-
Populism	1	-
People Reform	1	-
Pheu Chart Thai	1	-
Polamueng Thai	1	-
รวม	500	410
ว่าง	-	90

== Members of the House of Representatives ==
=== Constituencies ===
The following table is a list of Thai MPs elected in the 2019 general election, ordered by constituency.

Table of contents:

A B C D E F G H I J K L M N O P Q R S T U V W X Y Z Party-list Changes

==== A ====
Constituency	Area	Member elected	Notes
Amnat Charoen 1st district	Mueang Amnat Charoen District, Hua Taphan District	Somying Buabutr (Pheu Thai)	
Amnat Charoen 2nd district	Pathum Ratchawongsa District, Lue Amnat District, Chanuman District, Senangkhanikhom District, Phana District	Danaai Mahiphan (Pheu Thai)	
Ang Thong 1st district	Whole Province	Pharadon Sukunantakun (Bhumjaithai)	
==== B ====
Constituency	Area	Member elected	Notes
Bangkok 1st district	Phra Nakhon District, Pom Prap Sattru Phai District, Samphanthawong District, Dusit District (except Thanon Nakhon Chaisri Sub-district)	Karnkanit Heawsantati (Palang Pracharath)	
Bangkok 2nd district	Pathum Wan District, Bang Rak District, Sathon District	Patcharin Sumsiripong (Palang Pracharath)	
Bangkok 3rd district	Bang Kho Laem District, Yan Nawa District	Wanwari Talomsin (Future Forward)	
Bangkok 4th district	Khlong Toei District, Watthana District	Kornit Ngamsukonrattana (Palang Pracharath)	
Bangkok 5th district	Din Daeng District, Huai Khwang District	Pradoemchai Bunchuailaoe (Pheu Thai)	
Bangkok 6th district	Phaya Thai District, Ratchathewi District, Chatuchak District (Chatuchak and Chom Phon Sub-district)	Phada Worakanon (Palang Pracharath)	
Bangkok 7th district	Bang Sue District, Dusit District (Thanon Nakornchaisri Sub-district)	Thanikan Pornpongsaroj (Palang Pracharath)	
Bangkok 8th district	Lat Phrao District, Wang Thonglang District (Except Phlap Phla Sub-district)	Kasidej Chutimant (Palang Pracharath)	
Bangkok 9th district	Lak Si District, Chatuchak District (except Chatuchak and Chom Phon Sub-district)	Sira Jenjaka (Palang Pracharath)	
Bangkok 10th district	Don Mueng District	Karun Hosakul (Pheu Thai)	
Bangkok 11th district	Sai Mai District	Anudith Nakornthap (Pheu Thai)	
Bangkok 12th district	Bang Khen District	Anusorn Panthong (Pheu Thai)	
Bangkok 13th district	Bang Kapi District, Wang Thonglang District (Only in Phlap Phla district)	Thitiphat Chotitachachainan (Palang Pracharath)	
Bangkok 14th district	Bueng Kum District, Khan Na Yao District (Ramindra Sub-district)	Phonpoom Wipakphoomprathet (Pheu Thai)	
Bangkok 15th district	Min Buri District, Khan Na Yao District (Khan Na Yao Sub-district)	Charnwit Wipoosiri (Palang Pracharath)	
Bangkok 16th district	Klong Samwa District	Jirayu Huangsab (Pheu Thai)	
Bangkok 17th district	Nong Chok District	Siripong Rasmi (Palang Pracharath)	
Bangkok 18th district	Lat Krabang District	Theerarat Samretwanich (Pheu Thai)	
Bangkok 19th district	Saphan Sung District, Prawet District (except Nong Bon Sub-district)	Prasit Mahamat (Palang Pracharath)	
Bangkok 20th district	Suan Luang District, Prawet District (only Nong Bon Sub-district)	Monthon Pho-khai (Future Forward)	
Bangkok 21st district	Bang Na District, Phra Khanong District	Somkiat Thanomsin (Future Forward)	
Bangkok 22nd district	Khlong San District, Bangkok Yai District, Thon Buri District (except Dao Khanong, Bukkhalo and Samre Sub-district)	Taopiphop Limjittrakorn (Future Forward)	
Bangkok 23rd district	Chom Thong District, Thon Buri District (Dao Khanong, Bukkhalo and Samre Sub-district)	Chotipipat Techasoponmanee (Future Forward)	
Bangkok 24th district	Rat Burana District, Thung Khru District	Tossaporn Thongsiri (Future Forward)	
Bangkok 25th district	Bang Khun Thian District	Nattha Boonchai-insawat (Future Forward)	
Bangkok 26th district	Bang Bon District, Nong Khaem District (Nong Khaem District)	Wan Yubamrung (Pheu Thai)	
Bangkok 27th district	Thawi Watthana District, Taling Chan District (only Taling Chan and Chimphli Sub-district), Nong Khaem District (Nong Khang Phlu Sub-district)	Chirawat Aranyakanon (Future Forward)	
Bangkok 28th district	Bang Khae District	Natthaphong Ruengpanyawut (Future Forward)	
Bangkok 29th district	Phasi Charoen District, Taling Chan District (except Taling Chan and Chimphli Sub-district)	Supaporn Kongwutpanya (Pheu Thai)	
Bangkok 30th district	Bang Phlat District, Bangkok Noi District	Chakrapan Phonnimit (Palang Pracharath)	
Bueng Kan 1st district	Mueang Bueng Kan District, So Phisai District, Pak Khat District, Bung Khla District	Choedpong Rajpongkhan (Pheu Thai)	
Bueng Kan 2nd district	Seka District, Phon Charoen District, Si Wilai District, Bueng Khong Long District	Trairong Titham (Pheu Thai)	
Buriram 1st district	Mueang Buri Ram District (Except Bua Thong Subdistrict, Thalung Lek Subdistrict and Kalanta Subdistrict)	Satthep Aksornnarong (Bhumjaithai)	
Buriram 2nd district	Satuek District, Ban Dan District, Khaen Dong District, Mueang Buri Ram District (Only Bua Thong Sub-district, Thalung Lek Subdistrict and Kalanta Subdistrict)	Rungsikorn Thimatamka (Bhumjaithai)	
Buriram 3rd district	Khu Mueang District, Phutthaisong District, Na Pho District, Ban Mai Chaiyaphot District, Lam Plai Mat District (Only Khok Sa-at Sub-district and Muang Faek Sub-district)	Somboon Saram (Bhumjaithai)	
Buriram 4th district	Nong Hong District, Chani District, Lam Plai Mat District (Except Khok Sa-at Sub-district and Muang Faek Sub-district)	Sophon Saram (Bhumjaithai)	
Buriram 5th district	Krasang District, Phlapphla Chai District, Huai Rat District, Prakhon Chai District (Phaisan Subdistrict only)	Adipong Thitipittaya (Bhumjaithai)	
Buriram 6th district	Nong Ki District, Non Suwan District, Nang Rong District (Except Sap Phraya Sub-district and Chum Saeng Sub-district)	Trithep Ngamkamol (Bhumjaithai)	
==== C ====
Constituency	Area	Member elected	Notes
Chachoengsao 1st district	Mueang Chachoengsao District, Bang Nam Priao District (Saladaeng and Tambon Phrasat)	Kittichai Ruangsawat (Future Forward)	
Chachoengsao 2nd district	Phanom Sarakham District (Khao Hin Son Subdistrict, Nong Yao Subdistrict and Ban Song Subdistrict), Bang Khla District, Khlong Khuean District, Ratchasan District, Bang Nam Priao District (Except Saladaeng Subdistrict and Tambon Phrasat)	Chaiwat Paopiamsap (Palang Pracharath)	
Chachoengsao 3rd district	Tha Takiap District, Sanam Chai Khet District, Phanom Sarakham District (Except Khao Hin Son Subdistrict, Nong Yao Subdistrict and Ban Song Subdistrict)	Suchart Tancharoen (Palang Pracharath)	
Chachoengsao 4th district	Ban Pho District, Bang Pakong District, Plaeng Yao District	Jirat Thongsuwan (Future Forward)	
Chainat 1st district	Mueang Chai Nat District, Sapphaya District, Manorom District, Wat Sing District (Makham Tao Subdistrict, Nong Noi Subdistrict, Nong Bua Subdistrict, Nong Khun Subdistrict and Wat Sing Subdistrict Municipality)	Anucha Nakasai (Palang Pracharath)	
Chainat 2nd district	Sankhaburi District, Hankha District, Noen Kham District, Nong Mamong District, Wat Sing District (expect Makham Thao Subdistrict, Nong Noi Subdistrict, Nong Bua Subdistrict, Nong Khun Subdistrict and Wat Sing Subdistrict Municipality)	Montien Songpracha (Palang Pracharath)	
Chaiyaphum 1st district	Mueang Chaiyaphum District	Oshit Kiat Kongchuchai (Pheu Thai)	
Chaiyaphum 2nd district	Chatturat District, Noen Sa-nga District, Ban Khwao District, Nong Bua Rawe District	Choengchai Chaleerin (Palang Pracharath)	
Chaiyaphum 3rd district	Thep Sathit District, Bamnet Narong District, Phakdi Chumphon District, Sap Yai District	Samrit Thansap (Palang Pracharath)	
Chaiyaphum 4th district	Kaset Sombun District, Nong Bua Daeng District	Mana Lohavanich (Pheu Thai)	
Chaiyaphum 5th district	Phu Khiao District, Khon San District	Pornpen Boonsiriwattanakul (Pheu Thai)	
Chaiyaphum 6th district	Kaeng Khro District, Khon Sawan District, Ban Thaen District	Surawit Khonsomboon (Pheu Thai)	
Chanthaburi 1st district	Mueang Chanthaburi District, Laem Sing District	Thanaphat Kittiwongsa (Future Forward)	
Chanthaburi 2nd district	Tha Mai District, Na Yai Am District Kaeng Hang Maeo District, Khao Khitchakut District	Charuek Sri-on (Future Forward)	
Chanthaburi 3rd district	Pong Nam Ron District, Khlung District, Makham District, Soi Dao District	Yannicha Buaphuen (Future Forward)	
Chiang Mai 1st district	Mueang Chiang Mai District	Tassanee Buranupakorn (Pheu Thai)	
Chiang Mai 2nd district	Saraphi District, Hang Dong District	Noppakhun Rathpatai (Pheu Thai)	
Chiang Mai 3rd district	San Kamphaeng District, Doi Saket District, Mae On District	Chakkaphol Tangsuttitham (Pheu Thai)	
Chiang Mai 4th district	San Sai District, Phrao District, Mae Taeng District (Mae Ho Phra Sub-district)	Wittaya Songkum (Pheu Thai)	
Chiang Mai 5th district	Mae Rim District, Samoeng District, Kalanyani Vadhana District, Mae Taeng District (except Mae Ho Phra Subdistrict)	Sompong Amornviwat (Pheu Thai)	
Chiang Mai 6th district	Chai Prakan District, Chiang Dao District, Wiang Haeng District	Chulaphan Amornviwat (Pheu Thai)	
Chiang Mai 7th district	Fang District, Mae Ai District	Prasit Wutananchai (Pheu Thai)	
Chiang Mai 8th district	San Pa Tong District, Chom Thong District, Mae Wang District, Doi Lo District	Surapon Kiatchayakorn (Pheu Thai)	Later disqualified
Chiang Mai 8th district	San Pa Tong District, Chom Thong District, Mae Wang District, Doi Lo District	Srinuan Boonlue (Future Forward)	Elected following original MP's disqualification
Chiang Mai 9th district	Hot District, Mae Chaem District, Omkoi District, Doi Tao District	Sriret Kotkhamlue (Pheu Thai)	
Chiang Rai 1st district	Mueang Chiang Rai District	Aekkaphop Pheanwiset (Future Forward)	
Chiang Rai 2nd district	Mae Lao District, Mae Suai District, Wiang Pa Pao District	Wisit Techathirawat (Pheu Thai)	
Chiang Rai 3rd district	Phan District, Mueang Chiang Rai District	Wisarn Techathirawat (Pheu Thai)	
Chiang Rai 4th district	Thoeng District, Pa Daet District, Wiang Chai District Wiang Chiang Rung District	Rungsun Wanchaithanawong (Pheu Thai)	
Chiang Rai 5th district	Chiang Khong District, Wiang Kaen District, Khun Tan District, Phaya Mengrai District, Chiang Saen District (Only Mae Ngo Subdistrict)	Pichet Chuamuangpan (Pheu Thai)	
Chiang Rai 6th district	Mae Sai District, Chiang Saen District (Except Mae Ngo Subdistrict), Doi Luang District	Peeradech Khamsamut (Future Forward)	
Chiang Rai 7th district	Mae Chan District, Mae Fa Luang District	La-ong Tiyaphairat (Pheu Thai)	
Chonburi 1st district	Mueang Chon Buri District (Except Bang Pla Soi Sub-district Makham Yong Subdistrict, Ban Khot Subdistrict, Bang Sai Subdistrict, Nong Mai Daeng Sub-district Khlong Tamru Sub-district Don Hua Lo Sub-district and Ban Suan Subdistrict)	Suchart Chomklin (Palang Pracharath)	
Chonburi 2nd district	Mueang Chon Buri District (Bang Pla Soi Sub-district Makham Yong Subdistrict, Ban Khot Subdistrict, Bang Sai Subdistrict, Nong Mai Daeng Sub-district Khlong Tamru Sub-district Don Hua Lo Sub-district and Ban Suan Subdistrict, Phan Thong District (except Map Pong Subdistrict and Nong Hong Subdistrict)	Jungchai Wongsaithong (Palang Pracharath)	
Chonburi 3rd district	Phanat Nikhom District, Ko Chan District, Phan Thong District (Map Pong Sub-district and Nong Hong Subdistrict)	Ronthep Anuwat (Palang Pracharath)	
Chonburi 4th district	Ban Bueng District, Bo Thong District, Nong Yai District	Sorawut Neungchamnong (Palang Pracharath)	
Chonburi 5th district	Si Racha District (except Thung Sukhla Subdistrict and Bueng Sub-district), Ko Si Chang District	Kwanlert Panichmat (Future Forward)	
Chonburi 6th district	Si Racha District (Thung Sukhla Subdistrict and Bueng Sub-district), Bang Lamung District (Except Nong Prue Sub-district, Pong Subdistrict, Huai Yai Subdistrict and Khao Mai Kaew Sub-district)	Charas Khumkhainam (Future Forward)	
Chonburi 7th district	Banglamung (Only Nong Prue Sub-district, Pong Subdistrict, Huai Yai Subdistrict and Khao Mai Kaew Subdistrict)	Kawinnat Takee (Future Forward)	
Chonburi 8th district	Sattahip District	Satira Phuekprapan (Palang Pracharath)	
Chumphon 1st district	Mueang Chumphon District (Except Wang Mai Subdistrict, Ban Na Sub-district, Hat Phan Krai Sub-district, Bang Luek Sub-district and Tham Sing Sub-district), Sawi District (except Khao Thalu Sub-district and Khao Khai Subdistrict)	Chumphon Chulasai (Democrat)	
Chumphon 2nd district	Mueang Chumphon District (Wang Mai Sub-district, Ban Na Sub-district, Hat Phan Krai Sub-district, Bang Luek Sub-district, and Tham Sing Sub-district)	Sarawut Onlamai (Democrat)	
Chumphon 3rd district	Sawi District (Khao Thalu Sub-district and Khao Khai Subdistrict), Lang Suan District, Lamae District, Phato District, Thung Tako District	Supol Chulasai (Action Coalition for Thailand)	
==== K ====
Constituency	Area	Member elected	Notes
Kalasin 1st district	Mueang Kalasin District, Rong Kham District, Kamalasai District (Khok Sombun Subdistrict, Dong Ling Subdistrict, Chao Tha Sub-district and Phon Ngam Sub-district)	Boonreun Srithares (Pheu Thai)	
Kalasin 2nd district	Yang Talat District, Khong Chai District, Kamalasai District (except Khok Sombun Subdistrict, Dong Ling Subdistrict, Chao Tha Sub-district and Phon Ngam Sub-district)	Veeravath Osatanukroh (Pheu Thai)	
Kalasin 3rd district	Nong Kung Si District, Huai Mek District, Tha Khantho District, Sahatsakhan District	Komdej Chaisivamongkol (Pheu Thai)	
Kalasin 4th district	Somdet District, Kham Muang District, Na Mon District, Sam Chai District, Don Chan District	Peerapetch Sirikul (Pheu Thai)	
Kalasin 5th district	Kuchinarai District, Khao Wong District, Na Khu District, Huai Phueng District	Prasert Boonruang (Pheu Thai)	
Kamphaeng Phet 1st district	Mueang Kamphaeng Phet District (Nong Pling Sub-district, Ang Thong Subdistrict, Thep Nakorn Subdistrict, Nakhon Chum Sub-district, Khlong Mae Lai Subdistrict, Tamarong Subdistrict, Nikhom Thung Pho Thale Subdistrict, Wang Thong Subdistrict, Lan Flower Subdistrict, Thanee Sub-district, Tha Khun Ram Sub-district, Na Bo Kham Subdistrict and Songtham Sub-district)	Phai Lik (Palang Pracharath)	
Kamphaeng Phet 2nd district	Phran Kratai District, Lan Krabue District, Kosamphi Nakhon District, Sai Ngam District (Mahachai Subdistrict, Phan Thong Subdistrict, Nong Khla Subdistrict and Nong Thong Subdistrict), Mueang Kamphaeng Phet District (Only in Sa Kaeo)	Waipot Arpornrat (Palang Pracharath)	
Kamphaeng Phet 3rd district	Khlong Khlung District, Khlong Lan District, Pang Sila Thong District, Mueang Kamphaeng Phet District (Tritrung Subdistrict only)	Anan Pholamnuay (Palang Pracharath)	
Kamphaeng Phet 4th district	Khanu Woralaksaburi District, Bueng Samakkhi District, Sai Thong District, Sai Ngam District (except Mahachai Subdistrict, Phan Thong Subdistrict, Nong Khla Subdistrict and Nong Thong Subdistrict)	Parinya Loek-rai (Palang Pracharath)	
Kanchanaburi 1st district	Mueang Kanchanaburi District, Si Sawat District	Somchai Wissanuwong (Palang Pracharath)	
Kanchanaburi 2nd district	Tha Muang District, Dan Makham Tia District	Somkiet Vonpian (Palang Pracharath)	
Kanchanaburi 3rd district	Tha Maka District, Phanom Thuan District	Yossawat Mahapaisansin (Bhumjaithai)	
Kanchanaburi 4th district	Lao Khwan District, Huai Krachao District, Nong Prue District, Bo Phloi District	Thammawit Phothiphit (Palang Pracharath)	
Kanchanaburi 5th district	Thong Pha Phum District, Sangkhla Buri District, Sai Yok District	Atthapol Photiphit (Palang Pracharath)	
Khon Kaen 1st district	Mueang Khon Kaen District (Ban Ped)	Thitinan Saengnak (Future Forward)	
Khon Kaen 2nd district	Sam Sung District, Mueang Khon Kaen District (Sila Subdistrict, Ban Thum Sub-district, Phra Lap Sub-district, Nong Tum Sub-district, Tha Phra Subdistrict, Bueng Niam Sub-district, Khok Si Sub-district, Ban Wa Sub-district, Don Chang Sub-district, Don Han Subdistrict)	Wattana Changlao (Palang Pracharath)	
Khon Kaen 3rd district	Kranuan District, Nam Phong District	Jatuporn Jareonchua (Pheu Thai)	
Khon Kaen 4th district	Khao Suan Kwang District, Ubonrat District, Ban Fang District, Mueang Khon Kaen District (Ban Kho Subdistrict, Samran Sub-district, Non Ton Subdistrict and Sawathi Subdistrict)	Mookda Pongsombut (Pheu Thai)	
Khon Kaen 5th district	Nong Na Kham District, Phu Wiang District, Wiang Kao District, Pink District (except Na Chan Subdistrict, Sam Yang Subdistrict, Phu Han Subdistrict and Nong Daeng Subdistrict)	Phakkhawat Satsuraphon (Pheu Thai)	
Khon Kaen 6th district	Chum Phae District, Phu Pha Man District, Pink District (Na Chan Subdistrict, Sam Yang Subdistrict, Phu Han Subdistrict and Nong Daeng Subdistrict)	Singhaphon Dinang (Pheu Thai)	
Khon Kaen 7th district	Nong Ruea District, Mancha Khiri District	Nawat Tohcharoensook (Pheu Thai)	
Khon Kaen 8th district	Phon District, Waeng Noi District, Waeng Yai District, Khok Pho Chai District	Saranan Arunnopporn (Pheu Thai)	
Khon Kaen 9th district	Nong Song Hong District, Non Sila District, Chonnabot District, Pueai Noi District	Wanniwat Somboon (Pheu Thai)	
Khon Kaen 10th district	Ban Phai District, Ban Haet District, Phra Yuen District	Banlang Arunnopporn (Pheu Thai)	
Krabi 1st district	Mueang Krabi District, Ao Luek District, Plai Phraya District, Khao Phanom District (Na Khao Sub-district and Khao Din Subdistrict)	Sakorn Kiewkhong (Palang Pracharath)	
Krabi 2nd district	Nuea Khlong District, Khlong Thom District, Ko Lanta District, Lam Thap District, Khao Phanom District (except Na Khao Subdistrict and Khao Din Subdistrict)	Salitphong Kiewkhong (Bhumjaithai)	
==== L ====
Constituency	Area	Member elected	Notes
Lampang 1st district	Mueang Lampang District (Except Klaeng Municipality, Phichai Subdistrict, Subdistrict Lampang Municipality and Ban Sadet Sub-district), Hang Chat District	Kittikorn Losunthorn (Pheu Thai)	
Lampang 2nd district	Ngao District, Wang Nuea District, Chae Hom District, Mueang Pan District	Phairot Losunthorn (Pheu Thai)	
Lampang 3rd district	Mueang Lampang District (Khelang Municipality, Phichai Subdistrict, Sub-District Lampang Municipality and Ban Sadet Subdistrict, Mae Mo District, Mae Tha District	Jarusrit Jandrasurin (Pheu Thai)	
Lampang 4th district	Ko Kha District, Soem Ngam District, Sop Prap District, Thoen District, Mae Phrik District	Ittirut Jandrasurin (Pheu Thai)	
Lamphun 1st district	Mueang Lamphun District, Mae Tha District, Ban Thi District	Sa-nguan Pongmanee (Pheu Thai)	
Lamphun 2nd district	Wiang Nong Long District, Ban Hong District, Thung Hua Chang District, Li District, Pa Sang District	Rangsan Manirat (Pheu Thai)	
Loei 1st district	Mueang Loei District, Pak Chom District, Na Duang District, Erawan District (Erawan Sub-district and Pha In Plot Sub-district)	Lertsak Pattanachaikun (Pheu Thai)	
Loei 2nd district	Nong Hin District, Phu Luang District, Phu Kradueng District, Pha Khao District, Wang Saphung District (Wang Saphung Sub-district Nong Ya Plong Subdistrict, Pha Noi Subdistrict, Pha Bing Sub-district, Khok Khamin Subdistrict and Si Songkhram Sub-district), Erawan District (except Erawan Subdistrict and Pha In Plot Sub-district)	Saran Timsuwan (Pheu Thai)	
Loei 3rd district	Na Haeo District, Dan Sai District, Phu Ruea District, Tha Li District, Chiang Khan District, Wang Saphung District (Except Wang Saphung Sub-district Nong Ya Plong Sub-district, Pha Noi Subdistrict, Pha Bing Sub-district, Khok Khamin Subdistrict and Si Songkhram Sub-district)	Thanayot Timsuwan (Bhumjaithai)	
Lopburi 1st district	Downtown district (Khao Sam Yot Subdistrict, Tha Hin Subdistrict, Thale Chup Son Sub-district Khao Phra Ngam Subdistrict, Tha Sala Sub-district, Khok Tum Subdistrict, Nikhom Sang Ton Sub-district, Thanon Yai Subdistrict, Kok Ko Sub-district, Pa Tan Subdistrict and Tha Khae Sub-district)	Pratuan Sutthiramdej (Palang Pracharath)	
Lopburi 2nd district	Downtown district (Except Khao Sam Yot Sub-district, Tha Hin Sub-district, Talay Chup Son District Khao Phra Ngam Subdistrict, Tha Sala Sub-district, Khok Tum Subdistrict, Nikhom Sang Sub-district, Thanon Yai Subdistrict, Kok Ko Subdistrict, Pa Tan Subdistrict and Tha Khae Sub-district), Tha Wung District, Ban Mi District	Mallika Jiraphanvanich (Bhumjaithai)	
Lopburi 3rd district	Khok Samrong District, Nong Muang District, Phatthana Nikhom District	Ubonsak Bualuang-ngam (Pheu Thai)	
Lopburi 4th district	Chai Badan District, Tha Luang District, Lam Sonthi District, Sa Bot District, Khok Charoen District	Kiat Luangkachornwit (Bhumjaithai)	
==== M ====
Constituency	Area	Member elected	Notes
Mae Hong Son 1st district	Whole Province	Panya Jeenakham (Palang Pracharath)	
Maha Sarakham 1st district	Mueang Maha Sarakham District, Kae Dam District, Kosum Phisai District (Kaeng Kae Sub-district)	Kittisak Kanasawat (Pheu Thai)	
Maha Sarakham 2nd district	Wapi Pathum District, Borabue District (except Wang Chai Subdistrict, Non Daeng Subdistrict, Nong Khu Khat Sub-district and Non Rasi Sub-district)	Chaiwatana Tantirat (Pheu Thai)	
Maha Sarakham 3rd district	Phayakkhaphum Phisai District, Yang Sisurat District, Na Dun District, Na Chueak District (except Samrong Sub-district, Nong Daeng Sub-district, Po Phan Sub-district, Nong Mek District, and Nong Ruea Sub-district)	Yuttapong Jarussatien (Pheu Thai)	
Maha Sarakham 4th district	Kut Rang District, Na Chueak District (Samrong Subdistrict, Nong Daeng Subdistrict, Po Phan Sub-district, Nong Mek District, and Nong Ruea Sub-district), Kosum Phisai District (Hua Khwang Subdistrict, Yang Noi Sub-district, Wang Yao Sub-district, Khwao Rai Sub-district, Phaeng Sub-district, Nong Lek Sub-district, Nong Bon Sub-district, Nong Bon Sub-district, Phon Ngam Sub-district, Yang Tha Chaeng Sub-district Nong Kung Sawan Sub-district and Don Klang Sub-district), Borabue District (Wang Chai Sub-district, Non Daeng Subdistrict, Nong Khu Khat Sub-district and Non Rasi Sub-district)	Jirawat Siripanich (Pheu Thai)	
Maha Sarakham 5th district	Kantharawichai District, Chiang Yuen District, Chuen District, Kosum Phisai District (Nong Bua Sub-district, Southern District Subdistrict, Leung Tai Subdistrict and Khuean Sub-district)	Sutin Khangsang (Pheu Thai)	
Mukdahan 1st district	Mueang Mukdahan District (Si Bun Rueang Subdistrict, Kham Ahuan Sub-district, Dong Yen Subdistrict, Bang Sai Yai Sub-district, Ban Khok Sub-district, Kham Pa Lai Sub-district, Kut Khae Sub-district, Na Si Nuan Sub-district, and Phon Sai Sub-district), Don Tan District, Wan Yai District	Anurak Tangpanithanon (Pheu Thai)	
Mukdahan 2nd district	Mueang Mukdahan District (Except Mukdahan Subdistrict Si Bun Rueang Subdistrict, Kham Ahuan Sub-district, Dong Yen Sub-district, Bang Sai Yai Sub-district, Ban Khok Sub-district, Kham Pa Lai Sub-district, Kut Khae Sub-district, Na Si Nuan Sub-district, and Phon Sai Sub-district), Khamcha-i District, Nikhom Kham Soi District, Dong Luang District, Nong Sung District	Boonthin Pratoomlee (Pheu Thai)	
==== N ====
Constituency	Area	Member elected	Notes
Nakhon Nayok 1st district	Whole Province	Wuttichai Kittitanaesuan (Pheu Thai)	
Nakhon Pathom 1st district	Mueang Nakhon Pathom District (Phra Pathom Chedi Subdistrict, Nakhon Pathom Subdistrict, Lam Phaya Sub-district, Bo Phlap Subdistrict, Nong Pak Lo Sub-district Sanam Chan Sub-district Huai Chorakhe Sub-district Tambon Phrong Maduea Nong Din Daeng Subdistrict, Suan Pan Sub-district, Sa Kariam Subdistrict, Wang Taku Subdistrict, Wang Yen Sub-district, Phra Pratone Sub-district And Bang Khaem Sub-district)	Sinthop Kaewphichit (Democrat)	
Nakhon Pathom 2nd district	Mueang Nakhon Pathom District (Only Ban Yang Subdistrict, Thap Luang Sub-district, Nong Ngu Lueam Subdistrict, Ta Kong Subdistrict, Thung Noi Subdistrict and Map Khae Sub-district), Kamphaeng Saen District	Panuwat Sasomsap (Chartthaipattana)	
Nakhon Pathom 3rd district	Bang Len District, Don Tum District, Phutthamonthon District	Sutthawan Suban Na Ayutthaya (Future Forward)	
Nakhon Pathom 4th district	Mueang Nakhon Pathom District (Don Yai Hom Sub-district Sam Khwai Phueak Subdistrict, Thammasala Subdistrict and Thanon Khat Sub-district), Nakhon Chai Si District, Sam Phran District (Talad Chinda Subdistrict) Khlong Chinda Sub-district And Bang Chang Sub-district)	Pathomphong Soonchan (Palang Pracharath)	
Nakhon Pathom 5th district	Sam Phran District (except Talat Chinda Sub-district Khlong Chinda Sub-district And Bang Chang Sub-district)	Chompita Chantarakhachorn (Future Forward)	resigned on 10 September 2019
Nakhon Phanom 1st district	Si Songkhram District, Na Wa District, Ban Phaeng District, Na Thom District	Suphachai Phosu (Bhumjaithai)	
Nakhon Phanom 2nd district	Tha Uthen District, Phon Sawan District, Mueang Nakhon Phanom District (Only Nakhon Phanom Municipality, Tha Kho Subdistrict, Na Rat Subdistrict, Nong Khat Subdistrict and At Samat Sub-district)	Manapon Jaroensri (Pheu Thai)	
Nakhon Phanom 3rd district	That Phanom District, Renu Nakhon District, Mueang Nakhon Phanom District (Only Kham Thao Subdistrict, Kham Toei Subdistrict, Na Sai Subdistrict, Dong Khwang Sub-district, Ban Klang Subdistrict and Pho Tak Sub-district)	Paijit Sriworakan (Pheu Thai)	
Nakhon Phanom 4th district	Na Kae District, Pla Pak District, Wang Yang District, Mueang Nakhon Phanom District (Only Kuruku Subdistrict, Ban Phueng Sub-district, Wang Ta Mo Sub-district)	Chavalit Witchayasuth (Pheu Thai)	
Nakhon Ratchasima 1st district	Mueang Nakhon Ratchasima District (Nong Chabok Sub-district, Pho Klang Sub-district and Nong Phai Lom Sub-district)	Kasem Suparanon (Palang Pracharath)	
Nakhon Ratchasima 2nd district	Mueang Nakhon Ratchasima District (Only Cho Ho Subdistrict, Ban Mai Sub-district, Muen Wai Subdistrict, Khok Sung Subdistrict, Phutsa Sub-district, Ban Pho Sub-district Nong Krathum Subdistrict, Talat Subdistrict, Si Ang Sub-district, Nong Khai Nam Subdistrict, Ban Ko Sub-district, Maroeng Subdistrict, Phon Krang Sub-district, Khok Kruat Subdistrict, Suranaree Subdistrict and Pru Yai Sub-district)	Watcharaphon Tomornsak (Chart Pattana)	
Nakhon Ratchasima 3rd district	Sung Noen District, Kham Thale So District, Sikhio District (Sikhio Sub-district Lat Bua Khao Sub-district Nong Nam Sai Sub-district, Khlong Phai Subdistrict, Mittraphap Subdistrict and Nong Ya Khao Sub-district)	Prasert Chanthararuangthong (Pheu Thai)	
Nakhon Ratchasima 4th district	Non Sung District, Non Thai District (Kampang Subdistrict, Thanon Pho Subdistrict, Samrong Subdistrict, Dan Chak Subdistrict, and Makha Subdistrict) And Chiwan Subdistrict)	Thiwarat Ratanaset (Palang Pracharath)	
Nakhon Ratchasima 5th district	Bua Yai District, Kaeng Sanam Nang District, Bua Lai District, Sida District, Ban Lueam District	Kosol Pattama (Pheu Thai)	
Nakhon Ratchasima 6th district	Prathai District, Non Daeng District, Mueang Yang District, Lam Thamenchai District, Khong District (Thephalai Sub-district Kham Sombun Sub-district And Ta Chan Subdistrict)	Athirat Ratanaset (Palang Pracharath)	
Nakhon Ratchasima 7th district	Chum Phuang District, Phimai District (except Samrit Subdistrict, Tha Luang Subdistrict, Krabuang Yai Sub-district And Chiwan Subdistrict)	Tassaneeya Ratanaset (Palang Pracharath)	
Nakhon Ratchasima 8th district	Huai Thalaeng District, Chakkarat District, Chalerm Phra Kia District	Tassanaporn Ketmetheekarun (Palang Pracharath)	
Nakhon Ratchasima 9th district	Prathai District, Non Daeng District, Mueang Yang District, Lam Thamenchai District, Khong District (Thephalai Sub-district Kham Sombun Sub-district And Ta Chan Subdistrict)	Apicha Lertrattanakamon (Bhumjaithai)	
Nakhon Ratchasima 10th district	Khon Buri District, Soeng Sang District, Wang Nam Khiao District (Only Wang Nam Khiao Sub-district And Thai Samakkhi Subdistrict)	Pornchai Amnuaysub (Bhumjaithai)	
Nakhon Ratchasima 11th district	Pak Thong Chai District, Wang Nam Khiao District (Except Wang Nam Khiao Subdistrict And Thai Samakkhi Subdistrict, Mueang Nakhon Ratchasima District (Only Nong Bua Sala Sub-district And Chai Mongkhon Sub-district), Pak Chong District (Wang Katha Sub-district)	Somsak Phankasem (Palang Pracharath)	
Nakhon Ratchasima 12th district	Pak Chong District (except Wang Katha Sub-district)	Sirasit Lertduaylap (Pheu Thai)	
Nakhon Ratchasima 13th district	Dan Khun Thot District, Thepharak District, Sikhio District (except Sikhio District Lat Bua Khao Sub-district Nong Nam Sai Sub-district, Khlong Phai Subdistrict, Mittraphap Subdistrict and Nong Ya Khao Sub-district)	Wisit Phitthayaphon (Bhumjaithai)	
Nakhon Ratchasima 14th district	Kham Sakaesaeng District, Phra Thong Kham District, Khong District (except Thephalai Subdistrict Kham Sombun Sub-district And Ta Chan Subdistrict, Non Thai District (except Kampang Subdistrict, Thanon Pho Subdistrict, Samrong Subdistrict, Dan Chak Sub-district and Makha Subdistrict)	Suchart Pinyo (Pheu Thai)	
Nakhon Sawan 1st district	Mueang Nakhon Sawan District (Nakhon Sawan Subdistrict, Kwai Yai Subdistrict (Nakhon Sawan Municipality), Pak Nam Pho Sub-district, Wat Sai Subdistrict, Bang Muang Subdistrict, Ban Makluea Sub-district, Ban Kaeng Subdistrict, Nong Krot Sub-district, Nong Kradon Sub-district and Bueng Senat Sub-district), Kao Liao District (Maha Phot Sub-district), Lat Yao District (Nong Nong Sub-district)	Pinyo Niroj (Palang Pracharath)	
Nakhon Sawan 2nd district	Mueang Nakhon Sawan District (Except Nakhon Sawan Subdistrict, Kwai Yai Subdistrict, Pak Nam Pho Sub-district, Wat Sai Subdistrict, Bang Muang Subdistrict, Ban Makluea Sub-district, Ban Kaeng Subdistrict, Nong Krot Sub-district, Nong Kradon Sub-district and Bueng Senat Subdistrict, Phayuha Khiri District, Krok Phra District, Chum Saeng District (Thap Krit Tai Subdistrict)	Weerakorn Khamprakop (Palang Pracharath)	
Nakhon Sawan 3rd district	Banphot Phisai District, Chum Saeng District (except Thap Krit Tai Subdistrict), Kao Liao District (Except Mahaphot Subdistrict)	Sanya Ninsuphan (Palang Pracharath)	
Nakhon Sawan 4th district	Nong Bua District, Phaisali District (except Takro Subdistrict, Samrongchai Subdistrict and Pho Prasat Sub-district), Tha Tako District	Manop Sripung (Bhumjaithai)	
Nakhon Sawan 5th district	Takhli District, Tak Fa District, Phaisali District (Takro Subdistrict, Samrong Chai Sub-district, and Pho Prasat Sub-district)	Tayat Kiatchusak (Pheu Thai)	
Nakhon Sawan 6th district	Lat Yao District (except Nong Yao Subdistrict), Mae Wong District, Mae Poen District, Chum Ta Bong District	Nirot Soonthornle-kha (Palang Pracharath)	
Nakhon Si Thammarat 1st district	Mueang Nakhon Si Thammarat District (Tha Rai Subdistrict, Pak Nak Sub-district, Bang Chak Subdistrict, Chaiyamont Sub-district, Mamuang Song Ton Sub-district Pho Sadet Sub-district, Tha Ruea Sub-district, Tha Sak District and Nakhon Si Thammarat Municipality)	Rong Boonsuaykwan (Palang Pracharath)	
Nakhon Si Thammarat 2nd district	Pak Phanang District, Chian Yai District, Hua Sai District	Sanhaphot Suksrimuang (Palang Pracharath)	
Nakhon Si Thammarat 3rd district	Phra Phrom District, Chaloem Phra Kiat District, Cha-uat District, Chulabhorn District	Thepthai Senapong (Democrats)	
Nakhon Si Thammarat 4th district	Thung Song District, Bang Khan District	Prakorb Rattanapun (Democrats)	
Nakhon Si Thammarat 5th district	Thung Yai District, Tham Phannara District, Chawang District, Phipun District	Chinnavorn Boonyakiat (Democrats)	
Nakhon Si Thammarat 6th district	Ron Phibun District, Lansaka District, Chang Klang District, Na Bon District	Chaichana Dejdecho (Democrats)	
Nakhon Si Thammarat 7th district	Mueang Nakhon Si Thammarat District (Except Tha Rai Subdistrict, Pak Nak Sub-district, Bang Chak Subdistrict, Chai Montri Sub-district, Mango Song Ton Sub District Pho Sadet Sub-district, Tha Ruea Sub-district, Tha Sak District and Nakhon Si Thammarat Municipality), Tha Sala District	Sayan Yuttitham (Palang Pracharath)	
Nakhon Si Thammarat 8th district	Sichon District, Khanom District, Nopphitam District, Phrom Khiri District	Pimpattra Vichaikul (Democrats)	
Nan 1st district	Mueang Nan District, Phu Phiang District, Tha Wang Pha District	Sirinthorn Ramasut (Pheu Thai)	
Nan 2nd district	Wiang Sa District, Na Noi District, Na Muen District, Mae Charim District, Ban Luang District, Santisuk District	Cholnan Srikaew (Pheu Thai)	
Nan 3rd district	Pua District, Chiang Klang District, Song Khwae District, Bo Kluea District, Chaloem Phra Kiat District, Thung Chang District	Natthaphong Supriyasil (Pheu Thai)	
Narathiwat 1st district	Mueang Narathiwat District, Tak Bai District	Watchara Yawohasan (Palang Pracharath)	
Narathiwat 2nd district	Sungai Kolok District, Waeng District, Sungai Padi District	Samphan Mayuso (Palang Pracharath)	
Narathiwat 3rd district	Ra-nae District, Chana District, Cho-Iong District, Sukhirin District	Kuheng Yawohasan (Prachachart)	
Narathiwat 4th district	Bacho District, Yi-ngo District, Rueso District, Si Sakhon District	Kamolsak Leewamoe (Prachachart)	
Nong Bua Lamphu 1st district	Mueang Nong Bua Lam Phu District, Non Sang District (Kut Du Subdistrict, Non Sang Subdistrict, Ban Kho Subdistrict, Ban Thin Subdistrict and Pang Ku Subdistrict)	Siam Hatthasongkhro (Pheu Thai)	
Nong Bua Lamphu 2nd district	Si Bun Rueang District, Na Wang District (except Wang Pla Pom Sub-district), Non Sang District (except Kut Du Subdistrict, Non Sang Sub-district, Ban Kho Subdistrict, Ban Thin Subdistrict and Pang Ku Sub-district)	Chaiya Promma (Pheu Thai)	
Nong Bua Lamphu 3rd district	Na Klang District, Suwannakhuha District, Na Wang District (Wang Pla Pom Sub District)	Natthawut Kongchandee (Pheu Thai)	
Nong Khai 1st district	Mueang Nong Khai District (Except Phra That Bang Phuan Subdistrict And Wiang Khok Sub-district), Sakhrai District, Phon Phisai District (Laem Kham Kham Sub-district, Thung Luang Subdistrict and Sang Nang Khao Sub-district)	Kritsada Tantoettit (Pheu Thai)	
Nong Khai 2nd district	Phon Phisai District (Except Laeng Kham Kham Subdistrict, Thung Luang Subdistrict and Sang Nang Khao Sub-district), Rattanawapi District, Fao Rai District	Chanok Chantathong (Pheu Thai)	
Nong Khai 3rd district	Mueang Nong Khai District (Phra That Bang Phuan Sub-district And Wiang Khuk Sub-district) Tha Bo District, Si Chiang Mai District, Pho Tak District, Sangkhom District	Ekthanach Inrod (Pheu Thai)	
Nonthaburi 1st district	Mueang Nonthaburi District (Tha Sai Sub-district, Bang Kraso Subdistrict, Bang Khen Sub-district), Pak Kret District (Bang Phlap Sub-district, Om Kret Sub-district, Ko Kret Sub-district and Tha It Sub-district)	Charoen Reawrang (Palang Pracharath)	
Nonthaburi 2nd district	Mueang Nonthaburi District (Except Tha Sai Subdistrict, Bang Kraso Subdistrict and Bang Khen Subdistrict)	Jiraphong Songwatcharaporn (Pheu Thai)	
Nonthaburi 3rd district	Bang Kruai District, Bang Yai District (Ban Mai Sub-district Bang Mae Nang Sub-district and Bang Yai Sub-district	Manasak Chanprasong (Pheu Thai)	
Nonthaburi 4th district	Pak Kret District (Except Bang Phlap Sub-district Om Kret Sub-district Ko Kret Sub-district and Tha It Sub-district)	Montri Tangcharoenthawon (Pheu Thai)	
Nonthaburi 5th district	Bang Bua Thong (Phimonrat Subdistrict, Sano Loi Sub-district, Bang Rak Phatthana Sub-district and Bang Rak Yai Subdistrict, Bang Yai District (except Ban Mai Subdistrict, Bang Mae Nang Sub-district and Bang Yai Subdistrict	Wanchai Charoennonthasit (Pheu Thai)	
Nonthaburi 6th district	Sai Noi District, Bang Bua Thong District (Except Phimolrat Subdistrict, Sano Loi Sub-district, Bang Rak Phatthana Sub-district and Bang Rak Yai Sub-district)	Phananat Sri-insut (Pheu Thai)	
==== P ====
Constituency	Area	Member elected	Notes
Pathum Thani 1st district	Mueang Pathum Thani District (Bang Por Sub-district, Ban Chang Subdistrict, Bang Khayang Sub-district, Bang Khu Wat Sub-district, Bang Luang Subdistrict, Bang Dua Sub-district, Ban Mai Subdistrict and Bang Kadi Sub-district), Lat Lum Kaeo District	Surapong Ung-umponvilai (Pheu Thai)	
Pathum Thani 2nd district	Mueang Pathum Thani District (Except Bangpok Sub-district, Ban Chang Subdistrict, Bang Khayang Sub-district, Bang Khu Wat Sub-district, Bang Luang Subdistrict, Bang Dua Sub-district, Ban Mai Subdistrict and Bang Kadi Sub-district), Sam Khok District, Khlong Luang District (Only Khlong Luang Municipality)	Supachai Noppakam (Pheu Thai)	
Pathum Thani 3rd district	Khlong Luang District (only Tha Muang District, Khlong Sam Subdistrict and Khlong Si Sub-district)	Anavil Ratanasatapornn (Future Forward)	
Pathum Thani 4th district	Thanyaburi District (Prachatipat Sub-district), Lam Luk Ka District (Khukhot Sub-district)	Chaiyan Pholsuwan (Pheu Thai)	
Pathum Thani 5th district	Thanyaburi District (Bueng Yitho Sub-district), Lam Luk Ka District (except Khu Khot Sub-district)	Pornpimol Thammasan (Pheu Thai)	
Pathum Thani 6th district	Klong Luang Distinct (Khlong Ha Sub-district, Khlong Hok Sub-district, and Khlong Chet Sub-district), Nong Suea District, Thanyaburi District (Rangsit Subdistrict, Lam Phak Kut Subdistrict, Bueng Sanan Sub-district, and Bueng Nam Rak Sub-district)	Pisanu Pholthi (Bhumjaithai)	
Pattani 1st district	Mueang Pattani District, Yaring District (Bang Pu Sub-district Laem Pho Sub-district Talo Kapor Subdistrict, Yamu Subdistrict, Ratapun Subdistrict, Ta Kao Sub-district, Piyamumang Subdistrict, Talo Sub-district, Taliyar Sub-district and Pulukung Sub-district)	Anwar Salae (Democrats)	
Pattani 2nd district	Nong Chik District, Khok Pho District, Mae Lan District	Abdul Basim Abu (Bhumjaithai)	
Pattani 3rd district	Panare District, Sai Buri District, Mai Kaen District, Kapho District, Yaring District (except Bang Pu Sub-district Laem Pho Sub-district Talo Kapor Subdistrict, Yamu Subdistrict, Ratapun Subdistrict, Ta Kao Sub-district, Piyamumang Subdistrict, Talo Sub-district, Taliyar Sub-district and Pulukung Sub-district)	Anumat Susaroe (Prachachart)	
Pattani 4th district	Yarang District, Mayo District, Thung Yang Daeng District	Sommut Benchalak (Prachachart)	
Phang Nga 1st district	Whole Province	Kantawan Tontian Kuljanyawiwat (Democrats)	
Phatthalung 1st district	Mueang Phatthalung District, Khao Chaison District	Phumisit Kongmee (Bhumjaithai)	
Phatthalung 2nd district	Khuan Khanun District, Pa Phayom District, Si Banphot District, Srinakarin District	Chalong Terdwirapong (Bhumjaithai)	
Phatthalung 3rd district	Pak Phayun District, Pa Bon District, Kong Ra District, Tamot District, Bang Kaeo District	Naris Khamnurak (Democrats)	
Phayao 1st district	Mueang Phayao District, Mae Chai District	Thamanat Prompow (Palang Pracharath)	
Phayao 2nd district	Chiang Kham District, Chun District, Phu Sang District	Wisut Chainaroon (Pheu Thai)	
Phayao 3rd district	Dok Khamtai District, Phu Kam Yao District, Pong District, Chiang Muan District	Chiradej Sriwirat (Palang Pracharath)	
Phetchabun 1st district	Mueang Phetchabun District (Phetchabun Municipality, Na Ngua Subdistrict Municipality Tha Phon Subdistrict, Tha Phon Subdistrict, Sadiang Subdistrict, Pa Lao Subdistrict, Dong Mun Lek Sub-district, Ban Khok Subdistrict and Huai Yai Subdistrict, Khao Kho District, Lom Sak District (Nam Nun Sub District, Bung Nam Tao Subdistrict, Nong Khwai Sub-district, Nam Kor Subdistrict and Bung Khla Subdistrict)	Phimphorn Phornphutthiphan (Palang Pracharath)	
Phetchabun 2nd district	Lom Kao District, Nam Nao District, Lom Sak District (except Nam Chun District Bung Nam Tao Subdistrict, Nong Khwai Sub-district, Nam Kor Subdistrict and Bung Khla Subdistrict)	Chakrat Phuochuei (Palang Pracharath)	
Phetchabun 3rd district	Chon Daen District, Wang Pong District, Mueang Phetchabun District (Wang Chomphu Subdistrict, Wang Chomphu Subdistrict, Huai Sakae Subdistrict, Nai Ma Sub-district, Ban Tok Subdistrict, Nam Ron Subdistrict, Chon Phrai Subdistrict, Tabo Subdistrict and Na Pa Sub-district)	Wanphet Prompat (Palang Pracharath)	
Phetchabun 4th district	Bueng Sam Phan District, Nong Phai District, Mueang Phetchabun District (Rawing Subdistrict), Wichian Buri District (Sam Sith Sub-district)	Surasak Anakapan (Palang Pracharath)	
Phetchabun 5th district	Si Thep District, Wichian Buri District (Except Sam Yaek Sub-district)	Aiem Thongjaisot (Palang Pracharath)	
Phetchaburi 1st district	Mueang Phetchaburi District, Ban Laem District (Except Ban Laem Subdistrict, Bang Tabun Sub-district and Bang Tabun Sub-district)	Krit Keawyoo (Palang Pracharath)	
Phetchaburi 2nd district	Cha-am District, Tha Yang District	Satit Ui-trakool (Palang Pracharath)	
Phetchaburi 3rd district	Khao Yoi District, Ban Lat District, Nong Ya Plong District, Kaeng Krachan District, Ban Laem District (Ban Laem Subdistrict, Bang Tabun Sub-district and Bang Tabun Sub-district)	Suchart Usaha (Palang Pracharath)	
Phichit 1st district	Mueang Phichit District, Sam Ngam District, Wachirabarami District	Pornchai Insuk (Palang Pracharath)	
Phichit 2nd district	Taphan Hin District, Thap Khlo District, Dong Charoen District, Wang Sai Phun District, Sak Lek District	Phudit Insuwan (Palang Pracharath)	
Phichit 3rd district	Pho Thale District, Bang Mun Nak District, Bueng Na Rang District, Pho Prathap Chang District	Surachat Sributsakorn (Palang Pracharath)	
Phitsanulok 1st district	Mueang Phitsanulok District (Aranyik Subdistrict, Wat Chan Subdistrict, Ban Khlong Subdistrict, Phlai Chumphon Sub-district, Tha Thong Subdistrict, Bueng Phra Sub-district, Wat Phrik, and Wang Nam Khu Sub-district)	Padiphat Santipada (Future Forward)	
Phitsanulok 2nd district	Phrom Phiram District, Mueang Phitsanulok District (Only Phai Khok Don Sub-district, Chom Thong Subdistrict, Makham Sung Sub-district, Pak Thok Sub-district, Ban Krang Sub-district, Hua Ro Sub-district, Samo Khae Sub-district, Don Thong Subdistrict and Ban Pa Sub-district)	Noppol Luangtongtara (Pheu Thai)	
Phitsanulok 3rd district	Wang Thong District, Noen Maprang District	Anucha Noiwong (Palang Pracharath)	
Phitsanulok 4th district	Bang Rakam District, Bang Krathum District, Mueang Phitsanulok District (Only Ngiew Ngam Subdistrict And Tha Pho Sub-district)	Niyom Changpinij (Pheu Thai)	
Phitsanulok 5th district	Nakhon Thai District, Wat Bot District, Chat Trakan District	Manus On-aai (Palang Pracharath)	
Phra Nakhon Si Ayutthaya 1st district	Phra Nakhon Si Ayutthaya District, Uthai District	Kuakul Danchaiwichit (Bhumjaithai)	
Phra Nakhon Si Ayutthaya 2nd district	Bang Pahan District, Maha Rat District, Tha Ruea District, Nakhon Luang District, Phachi District, Ban Phraek District	Nop Cheewanan (Pheu Thai)	
Phra Nakhon Si Ayutthaya 3rd district	Bang Pa-in District, Bang Sai District, Wang Noi District	Surasak Phancharoenworakun (Bhumjaithai)	
Phra Nakhon Si Ayutthaya 4th district	Sena District, Bang Sai District, Phak Hai District, Bang Ban District, Lat Bua Luang District	Chirathat Kraidecha (Pheu Thai)	
Phrae 1st district	Mueang Phrae District, Song District, Rong Kwang District, Nong Muang Khai District	Aekkarn Suesongtham (Future Forward)	
Phrae 2nd district	Sung Men District, Den Chai District, Long District, Wang Chin District	Krittinai Sankaew (Future Forward)	
Phuket 1st district	Mueang Phuket District (Except Ko Kaeo Sub-district, Rawai Subdistrict and Karon Subdistrict)	Sutha Phateep Na Thalang (Palang Pracharath)	
Phuket 2nd district	Thalang District, Kathu District, Mueang Phuket District (Ko Kaeo Sub-district, Rawai Subdistrict and Karon Subdistrict)	Natthi Thinsakhoo (Palang Pracharath)	
Prachinburi 1st district	Mueang Prachin Buri District, Ban Sang District, Si Mahosot District	Amnart Vilawan (Bhumjaithai)	
Prachinburi 2nd district	Si Maha Phot District, Prachantakham District, Kabin Buri District (Only Lat Takhian Sub-district Tambon Hat Nang Kaeo, Tambon Wang Dan, Tambon Nonsi, and Na Khaem Sub-district)	Chayut Pummakarnjana (Bhumjaithai)	
Prachinburi 3rd district	Na Di District, Kabin Buri District (Except Lat Lat District Tambon Hat Nang Kaeo, Tambon Wang Dan, Tambon Nonsi, and Na Khaem Sub-district)	Sarit Butnien (Bhumjaithai)	
Prachuap Khiri Khan 1st district	Mueang Prachuap Khiri Khan District, Kui Buri District, Sam Roi Yot District	Montri Panoinont (Democrats)	
Prachuap Khiri Khan 2nd district	Hua Hin District, Pran Buri District	Pornthep Wisutwattanasak (Pheu Thai)	
Prachuap Khiri Khan 3rd district	Thap Sakae District, Bang Saphan District, Bang Saphan Noi District	Pramual Pongtavaradech (Democrats)	
==== R ====
Constituency	Area	Member elected	Notes
Ranong 1st district	Whole Province	Kongkrit Chatmaleerat (Bhumjaithai)	
Ratchaburi 1st district	Mueang Ratchaburi District (Except Nam Phu Sub-district, Huai Phai Sub-district, Don Rae Sub-district and Ang Thong Sub-district)	Kulwalee Nop-amornbadee (Palang Pracharath)	
Ratchaburi 2nd district	LMueang Ratchaburi District (Only Nam Phu Sub-district, Huai Phai Sub-district, Don Rae Sub-district and Ang Thong Subdistrict), Pak Tho District, Suan Phueng District, Wat Phleng District, Ban Kha District	Boonying Nitikanchana (Palang Pracharath)	
Ratchaburi 3rd district	Photharam District (except Ban Khong Sub-district Ban Sing Sub-district And Don Sai Subdistrict, Chom Bueng District	Parina Kraikupt (Palang Pracharath)	
Ratchaburi 4th district	Ban Pong District	Akaradej Wongpitakroj (Democrats)	
Ratchaburi 5th district	Damnoen Saduak District, Bang Phae District, Photharam District (Ban Khong Sub-district Ban Sing Sub-district And Don Sai Subdistrict)	Bunlue Prasertsopha (Bhumjaithai)	
Rayong 1st district	Mueang Rayong District (Except Map Ta Phut Municipality, Thapma Subdistrict Municipality And Municipality of Noen Phra)	Satit Pitudecha (Democrats)	
Rayong 2nd district	Klaeng District, Wang Chan District, Khao Chamao District	Bunyat Jettanajan (Democrats)	
Rayong 3rd district	Ban Khai District, Pluak Daeng District, Nikhom Phatthana District	Tara Pitudecha (Democrats)	
Rayong 4th district	Mueang Rayong District (Only Map Ta Phut Municipality, Thapma Subdistrict Municipality And Municipality of Noen Phra), Ban Chang District	Sompong Sophon (Palang Pracharath)	
Roi Et 1st district	Mueang Roi Et District, Si Somdet District	Anurak Jureemat (Chartthaipattana)	
Roi Et 2nd district	Pho Chai District, Changhan District, Chiang Khwan District, Thawat Buri District (Only Thawat Buri Subdistrict, Niwet Subdistrict, Nong Phok Sub-district, Ma-u Sub-district, Um Mao Subdistrict, Nong Phai Subdistrict, Phaisan Subdistrict, Thong Thani Subdistrict and Bueng Nakhon Sub-district)	Chalard Karmchuang (Pheu Thai)	
Roi Et 3rd district	Phon Thong District, Moei Wadi District, Nong Phok District (Nong Phok Subdistrict, Phu Khao Thong Subdistrict, Bueng Ngam Subdistrict, Pha Nam Yoi Subdistrict, Khok Sawang Sub-district, Kok Pho Sub-district)	Niramit Sujaree (Pheu Thai)	
Roi Et 4th district	Selaphum District, Thung Khao Luang District, Thawat Buri District (Except Thawat Buri Subdistrict, Niwet Subdistrict, Nong Phok Subdistrict, Ma-u Sub-district, Um Mao Subdistrict, Nong Phai Subdistrict, Phaisan Subdistrict, Thong Thani Subdistrict and Bueng Nakhon Subdistrict) Tambon Mueang Mueang), At Samat District (Only Ban Chaeng Sub-district And Phon Mueang Sub-district)	Nirun Namuangruck (Pheu Thai)	
Roi Et 5th district	Phanom Phrai District, Nong Hi District, Phon Sai District, At Samat District (Except Ban Chaeng Sub-district And Phon Mueang Sub-district)	Chiraphon Sinthuprai (Pheu Thai)	
Roi Et 6th district	Suwannaphum District, Mueang Suang District, Chaturaphak Phiman District (Hua Chang Subdistrict, Dong Daeng Subdistrict, Dong Klang Sub-district, Pa Sang Sub-district, Nam Sai Subdistrict)	Kitti Somsub (Pheu Thai)	
Roi Et 7th district	Kaset Wisai District, Pathum Rat District, Chaturaphak Phiman District (Except Hua Chang Subdistrict, Dong Daeng Subdistrict, Dong Klang Sub-district, Pa Sang Sub-district, Nam Sai Subdistrict and Si Khot Sub-district)	Sakda Khongpetch (Pheu Thai)	
==== S ====
Constituency	Area	Member elected	Notes
Sa Kaeo 1st district	Mueang Sa Kaeo District, Khao Chakan District, Wang Nam Yen District (Thung Mahacharoen Subdistrict)	Thanis Thienthong (Palang Pracharath)	
Sa Kaeo 2nd district	Watthana Nakhon District (Except Chong Kum Sub-district And Sae-O Sub-district), Wang Nam Yen District (Except Thung Mahacharoen Subdistrict), Khlong Hat District, Wang Sombun District	Trinuch Thienthong (Palang Pracharath)	
Sa Kaeo 3rd district	Aranyaprathet District, Ta Phraya District, Khok Sung District, Watthana Nakhon District (Only Chong Kum Sub-district And Zaire district)	Surasak Chingwon (Palang Pracharath)	
Sakon Nakhon 1st district	Mueang Sakon Nakhon District	Apichart Teerasawasdichai (Pheu Thai)	
Sakon Nakhon 2nd district	Kusuman District, Phon Na Kaeo District, Khok Si Suphan District, Tao Ngoi District, Phu Phan District	Niyom Vejkama (Pheu Thai)	
Sakon Nakhon 3rd district	Phang Khon District, Waritchaphum District, Song Dao District, Nikhom Nam Un District, Kut Bak District	Phatthana Sapphaso (Pheu Thai)	
Sakon Nakhon 4th district	Sawang Daen Din District, Charoen Sin District	Anurak Boonson (Pheu Thai)	
Sakon Nakhon 5th district	Wanon Niwat District, Ban Muang District	Sakuna Saranun (Pheu Thai)	
Sakon Nakhon 6th district	Phanna Nikhom District, Akat Amnuai District, Kham Ta Kla District	Kasem Aooppara (Pheu Thai)	

=== Party-list proportional representation ===
The following is a table of Party-list MP's ordered by party from most to least popular votes.

Party	List no.	Name	Notes
Phalang Pracharat	1	Nattaphol Teepsuwan	
Phalang Pracharat	2	Suriya Juangroongruangkit	
Phalang Pracharat	3	Phutthiphong Punnakan	
Phalang Pracharat	4	Somsak Thepsuthin	
Phalang Pracharat	5	Naruemon Phinyosinwat	
Phalang Pracharat	6	Santi Kiranan	
Phalang Pracharat	7	Wirat Rattanaset	
Phalang Pracharat	8	Santi Phromphat	
Phalang Pracharat	9	Suphon Fongngam	
Phalang Pracharat	10	Chaiyawut Thanakamanuson	
Phalang Pracharat	11	Ekkarat Changlao	
Phalang Pracharat	12	Phitcharat Laohaphongchana	
Phalang Pracharat	13	Bunsing Warinrak	
Phalang Pracharat	14	Surasit Wongwitthayanan	
Phalang Pracharat	15	Surasit Nithiwutthiworarak	
Phalang Pracharat	16	Phongkawin Juangroongruangkit	
Phalang Pracharat	17	Wichian Chawalit	
Phalang Pracharat	18	Atthakon Sirilatthayakon	
Phalang Pracharat	19	Wathanya Wong-ophasi	Seat gained after Chiang Mai 8th district by-election
Future Forward	1	Thanathorn Juangroongruangkit	
Future Forward	2	Piyabutr Saengkanokkul	
Future Forward	3	Wanwipha Maison	
Future Forward	4	Phitha Limcharoenrat	
Future Forward	5	Kunthida Rungruengkiat	
Future Forward	6	Pongskorn Rodchompoo	
Future Forward	7	Pannika Wanich	
Future Forward	8	Surachet Prawinwongwut	
Future Forward	9	Tanwarin Sukkhapisit	
Future Forward	10	Phichan Chaowapatthanawong	
Future Forward	11	Janevit Kraisin	
Future Forward	12	Surachai Srisarakam	
Future Forward	13	Chamnan Chanrueng	
Future Forward	14	Aphichat Sirisunthorn	
Future Forward	15	Sirikanya Tansakul	
Future Forward	16	Rangsiman Rome	
Future Forward	17	Yaowalux Wongpraparat	
Future Forward	18	Jaruwan Sarunyagate	
Future Forward	19	Win Suthichai	
Future Forward	20	Klaikong Waithayakan	
Future Forward	21	Suthep U-on	
Future Forward	22	Parinya Chuaiket Khirirat	
Future Forward	23	Nattapon Suepsakwong	
Future Forward	24	Thanyawat Kamonwongwat	
Future Forward	25	Kharom Phonphornklang	
Future Forward	26	Somchai Fangchonchit	
Future Forward	27	Wayo Atsawaruengrueang	
Future Forward	28	Khamphong Thephakam	
Future Forward	29	Amarat Chokpamitkun	
Future Forward	30	Suphisan Phakdinaruenat	
Future Forward	31	Niraman Sulaiman	
Future Forward	32	Nitipon Phiomo	
Future Forward	33	Wiroj Lakkhanaadisorn	
Future Forward	34	Wirat Phanthumaphon	
Future Forward	35	Pakonwut Udomphiphatsakun	
Future Forward	36	Woraphop Viriyaroj	
Future Forward	37	Kanphong Chongsutthamani	
Future Forward	38	Bencha Saengchan	
Future Forward	39	Chawalit Laoha-udomphan	
Future Forward	40	Natthawut Buapratum	
Future Forward	41	Thawisak Thaksin	
Future Forward	42	Prasoetphong Sonnuwat	
Future Forward	43	Surawat Thongbut	
Future Forward	44	Ongkan Chaibut	
Future Forward	45	Samli Raksutthi	
Future Forward	46	Kasemsan Mi-thip	
Future Forward	47	Thiratchai Phanthumat	
Future Forward	48	Somkiat Chaiwisutthikul	
Future Forward	49	Natiphat Kunsetthasit	
Future Forward	50	Chunlaphan Nonsrichai	
Democrat	1	Abhisit Vejjajiva	Later resigned
Democrat	2	Chuan Leekpai	
Democrat	3	Banyat Bantadtan	
Democrat	4	Thoetphong Chaiyanan	
Democrat	5	Kalaya Sophonpanich	
Democrat	6	Jurin Laksanawisit	
Democrat	7	Korn Chatikavanij	
Democrat	8	Chuti Krairoek	
Democrat	9	Ong-at Khlamphaibun	
Democrat	10	Siriwan Pratsachaksattru	
Democrat	11	Issara Somchai	
Democrat	12	Asawin Wiphusiri	
Democrat	13	Kiat Sittheeamorn	
Democrat	14	Kanok Wongtrangan	
Democrat	15	Sisamon Ratsamiroekset	
Democrat	16	Phiraphan Saliratthawiphak	
Democrat	17	Phanit Wikitset	
Democrat	18	Aphichai Techaubon	
Democrat	19	Wirachai Wirametikun	
Democrat	20	Chittaphat Kritdakon	Seat gained after Chiang Mai 8th district by-election
Democrat	21	Suthat Ngoenmeun	Seat replaced after Abhisit's resignation
Bhumjaithai	1	Anutin Charnvirakul	
Bhumjaithai	2	Chai Chidchob	
Bhumjaithai	3	Saksiam Chidchob	
Bhumjaithai	4	Nathi Ratkitprakan	
Bhumjaithai	5	Son-at Klinpratum	
Bhumjaithai	6	Songsak Thongsri	
Bhumjaithai	7	Wirasak Wangsuphakitkoson	
Bhumjaithai	8	Suphamat Isaraphakdi	
Bhumjaithai	9	Korawi Pritsanananthakun	
Bhumjaithai	10	Siriwat Kachonprasat	
Bhumjaithai	11	Phetdao To-mina	
Bhumjaithai	12	Suphachai Chaisamut	
Thai Liberal	1	Seripisut Temiyavet	
Thai Liberal	2	Watchara Na Wangkanai	
Thai Liberal	3	Wirat Warotsirin	
Thai Liberal	4	Rewat Witsaruwet	
Thai Liberal	5	Prasong Bunphong	
Thai Liberal	6	Naphaphon Phetchinda	
Thai Liberal	7	Phet Ekkamlangkun	
Thai Liberal	8	Thanaphon Somthongdaeng	
Thai Liberal	9	Ampai Kongmani	
Thai Liberal	10	Witsanu Muangphraesi	
Chartthaipattana	1	Warawut Silpa-archa	
Chartthaipattana	2	Thira Wongsamut	
Chartthaipattana	3	Nikon Chamnong	
Chartthaipattana	4	Noppadon Matsi	
New Economics	1	Mingkwan Saengsuwan	
New Economics	2	Suphadit Akatroek	
New Economics	3	Niyom Wiwatthanatithakun	
New Economics	4	Phatsakon Ngoencharoenkun	
New Economics	5	Manun Siwaphiromrat	
New Economics	6	Marasi Khachonrueangrot	
Prachachart	1	Wan Muhamad Noor Matha	
Puea Chat	1	Songkhram Kitloetphairot	
Puea Chat	2	Piyarat Tiyaphairat	
Puea Chat	3	Ari Krainara	
Puea Chat	4	Phetchawat Watthanaphongsirikun	
Puea Chat	5	Linda Choetchai	
Action Coalition for Thailand	1	Chatumongol Sonakul	
Action Coalition for Thailand	2	Phetchompoo Kitburana	
Action Coalition for Thailand	3	Khetrat Laothamthat	
Action Coalition for Thailand	4	Anusi Thapsuwan	
Chart Pattana	1	Thewan Liptaphallop	
Chart Pattana	2	Don Hetrakun	
Thai Local Power	1	Chatchawal Kong-udom	
Thai Local Power	2	Kowit Phuangngam	
Thai Local Power	3	Noppadon Kaewsuphat	
Thai Forest Conservation	1	Damrong Pidej	
Thai Forest Conservation	2	Yanyong Thanomphichaithamrong	
Thai People Power	1	Nikhom Bunwiset	
Thai Nation Power	1	Songklot Thiprat	
People Progressive	1	Somkiat Sornlam	
Thai Civilized	1	Mongkolkit Suksintharanon	
Palang Thai Rak Thai	1	Khatathep Techadetrueangkun	
Thai Teachers for People	1	Prida Bunphloeng	
Prachaniyom	1	Yongyut Thepchamnong	
Thai People Justice	1	Phichet Satirachawan	
People Reform	1	Paiboon Nititawan	
Polamuang Thai	1	Silampha Loetnuwat	
New Democracy	1	Surathin Phichan	
New Palangdharma	1	Ravee Maschamadol	
Thairaktham	1	Phirawit Ruengluedolaphak	Seat lost after Chiang Mai 8th district by-election

=== Changes & by-elections ===
==== Constituencies ====
Date	Constituency	Area	Outgoing MP	Cause of leaving	Incoming MP	Notes
26 May 2019	Chiang Mai 8th district	San Pa Tong District, Chom Thong District, Mae Wang District, Doi Lo District	Surapon Kiatchayakorn (Pheu Thai)	Disqualified	Srinaun Boonlue (Future Forward)	
TBA	Nakhon Pathom 5th district	Sam Phran District (except Talat Chinda Sub-district Khlong Chinda Sub-district And Bang Chang Sub-district)	Chompita Chantarakhachorn (Future Forward)	Resigned		

==== Party-list seats ====
Outgoing MP	Date of leaving seat	Incoming MP	Date of taking seat	Cause
Phirawit Ruengluedolaphak (Thairaktham)	29 May 2019	Wathanya Wong-ophasi (Phalang Pracharat)	29 May 2019	Re-calculation after Chiang Mai 8th district by-election
Phirawit Ruengluedolaphak (Thairaktham)	29 May 2019	Chittaphat Kritdakon (Democrat)	29 May 2019	Re-calculation after Chiang Mai 8th district by-election
Abhisit Vejjajiva (Democrat)	5 June 2019	Suthat Ngoenmeun (Democrat)	6 June 2019	Resignation
