= Kraikupt =

Kraikupt is a Thai surname. Notable people with the surname include:

- Pareena Kraikupt (born 1976), Thai politician
- Thawee Kraikupt (1939–2024), Thai politician
