= Tancharoen =

Tancharoen is a surname of Thai origin. Notable people with the surname include:

- Kevin Tancharoen (born 1984), American dancer, choreographer, television producer and director
- Maurissa Tancharoen (born 1975), American television producer, writer, actress, singer, lyricist and dancer
- Suchart Tancharoen (born 1958), Thai politician
