= Chaithip Kamolpanthip =

Thai politician (born 1964)

- ชัยทิพย์ กมลพันธ์ทิพย์

Member of the 25th House of Representatives
- Incumbent
- Assumed office May 30, 2022
- Preceded by: Pareena Kraikupt
- Constituency: Ratchaburi-3

Personal details
- Born: 19 April 1964 (age 61) Photharam, Ratchaburi, Thailand
- Party: Democrat Party

Chaithip Kamolpanthip (Thai: ชัยทิพย์ กมลพันธ์ทิพย์; born April 19, 1964), usually known by his nickname "Seng" (เส็ง), is a Thai politician who served as the MP for Ratchaburi province in the 25th House of Representatives.

== Biography and career ==
He was born and lived in Photharam district all along. His family was wealthy through various occupations such as gold shops, leasing, as well as several resort businesses in local and nearby such as Kanchanaburi or Samut Sakhon. For Chaithip, known by the people of Ratchaburi from being a member of the Provincial Administrative Organization (PAO) and his generosity.

He first ran for MP in the general election on March 24, 2019, in constituency 3, Ratchaburi province (comprising most of Photharam district and entire of Chom Bueng district) under the Democrat Party. He was unsuccessful when losing to arch-rival Pareena Kraikupt from Palang Pracharath Party with a decisive point of over 16,900.

The winner Pareena Kraikupt was stripped of MP status and banned from politics lifelong for encroaching on forest reserves on April 7, 2022, from the judgment of the Supreme Court's Criminal Division for Holders of Political.

The by-election is held on May 21, 2022, just one day before the Bangkok governor's election. Democrat candidate's Chaithip Kamolpanthip came first with 51,743 votes, followed far behind by Natthanant Nithiponyangsanga of the Thai Liberal Party with 16,853 votes and Pinyosilp Sangwanwong of the Equality Party with 1,889 votes.

On May 30, the Election Commission (EC) announced that he would be a member of parliament for Ratchaburi province.

== See also ==
- Akaradej Wongpitakroj
