= Pannika Wanich =

Thai journalist and politician (born 1988)

- พรรณิการ์ วานิช
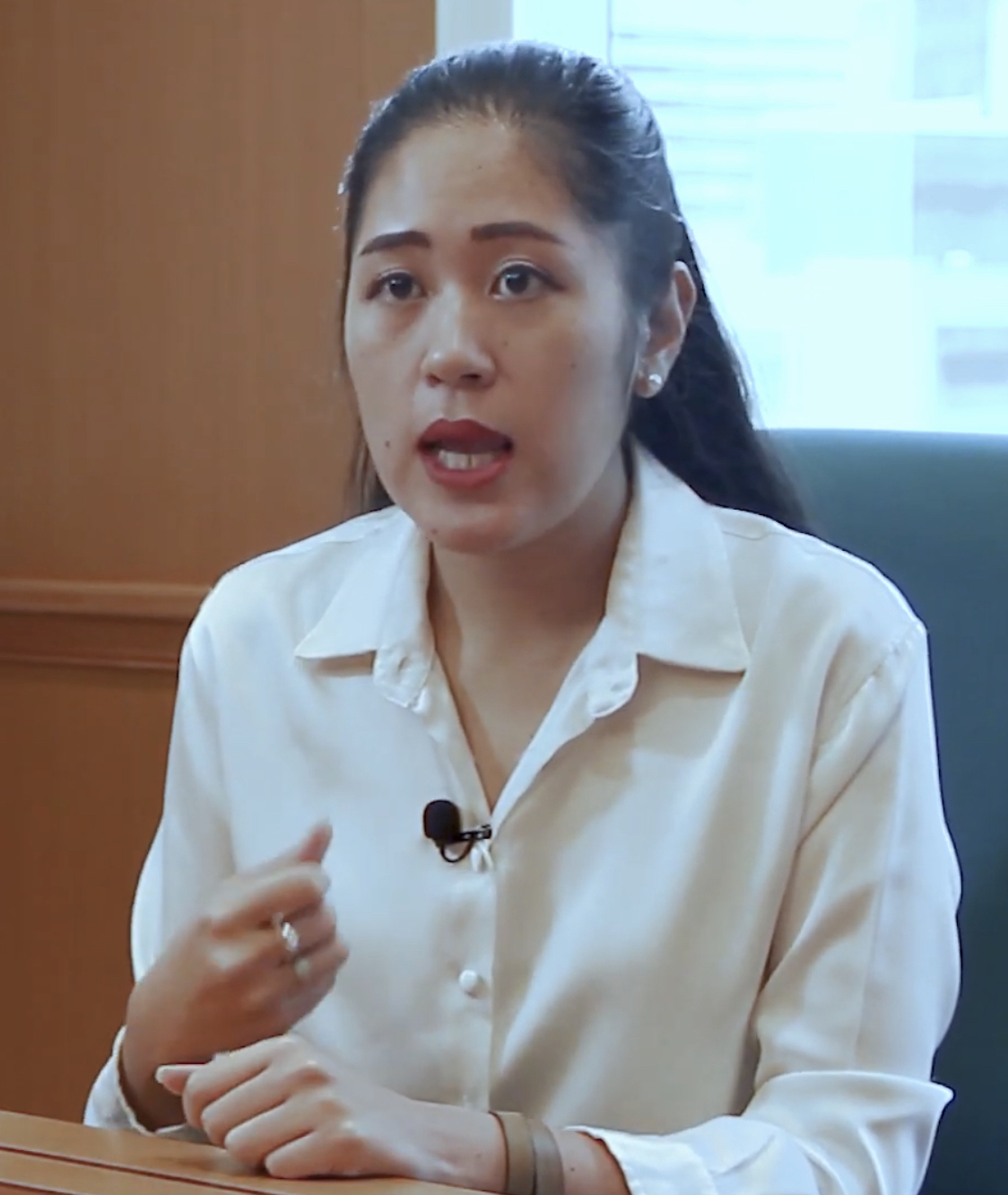

Member of the House of Representatives Party-list
- In office 24 March 2019 – 21 February 2020 (334 days)

Spokesperson of the Future Forward Party
- In office 27 May 2018 – 21 February 2020 (1 year, 270 days)
- Succeeded by: Wiroj Lakkhanaadisorn (Move Forward Party)

Spokesperson of the Progressive Movement
- Incumbent
- Assumed office 18 March 2020 (6 years, 224 days)

Personal details
- Born: January 28, 1988 (age 38) Bangkok, Thailand
- Party: Future Forward Party (2018–2020); Progressive Movement (2020–present)
- Education: Chulalongkorn University (BA); London School of Economics (MSc)
- Occupation: Television presenter Politician
- Nickname: Chor

Pannika Wanich (Thai: พรรณิการ์ วานิช; born January 28, 1988), also known as Chor, is a Thai journalist, political activist, and former politician. She previously served as the spokesperson for the Future Forward Party and was a member of the 25th House of Representatives (party-list). She was also a television presenter at Voice TV from 2011 to 2017.

In 2023, the Supreme Court of Thailand gave her a lifetime ban from politics, citing her inappropriate photo related to the Thai monarchy.

== Early life and education ==
Pannika was born on January 28, 1988, in Thailand. She attended Khema Siri Memorial School for her secondary education before enrolling at Chulalongkorn University, where she earned a bachelor's degree in International Relations with first-class honors in 2010. She later obtained a master's degree in Global Politics from the London School of Economics and Political Science (LSE) in the United Kingdom.

During her studies, she interned at the Department of South Asia, Middle East, and Africa under the Ministry of Foreign Affairs (Thailand).

== Career ==
After graduating, Pannika worked at Voice TV from 2011 to 2017, and hosted the following programs:

1. Host of the documentary series on Thailand and ASEAN relations, iASEAN (program ended).
2. Host of the political and economic news analysis program, Tonight Thailand (currently Talking Thailand).
3. Host of the variety show Divas Café, which covered topics such as politics, human rights, fashion, culture, and travel from a woman's perspective (program ended).
4. Host of the international news program, Voice World Wide (program ended).

Her last position before resigning was as Foreign News Editor.

=== Journalism ===
From 2011 to 2017, Pannika worked as a journalist and television presenter at Voice TV, covering political and social issues.

=== Political career ===
In 2018, she co-founded the Future Forward Party and was appointed as its spokesperson and executive committee member. She was elected as a party-list member of the House of Representatives in the 2019 general election. However, following the dissolution of the Future Forward Party in February 2020, she transitioned to the Progressive Movement, a political advocacy group formed by former party members.

She is currently involved with the Progressive Movement, serving as its spokesperson.

Pannika joined the Future Forward Party and served as an executive committee member and party spokesperson. In the 2019 Thai general election, she ran as the 7th candidate on the party-list and was elected as a Member of Parliament.

During the parliamentary session, Pannika stood up to debate before the vote for the first Deputy Speaker, requesting that the candidates present their visions. The Pheu Thai Party nominated Yaowalak Wongpraparat from the Future Forward Party to compete against Suchart Tancharoen from the Palang Pracharath Party. This led to a chaotic session, with many female MPs supporting Pannika's request, causing the Speaker to call for a recess. Later, Pannika admitted in an interview that it was a mistake to stand up and debate before being given permission by the Speaker, and she promised to improve as a new MP.

Pannika's final debate in the House of Representatives addressed the regression to a "dark, primitive, and violent" era under the power of Section 44 of the National Council for Peace and Order.

After the dissolution of the Future Forward Party and the 10-year political ban on its executive committee members, Pannika and 11 other banned members moved to work with the Progressive Movement. The movement focuses on working outside parliament, unlocking local elections, and supporting the amendment of Section 112. Additionally, Pannika continues her advocacy through social media platforms such as YouTube and TikTok.

Pannika criticized the government of Prayut Chan-o-cha outside parliament, alleging potential involvement in the 1MDB (1Malaysia Development Berhad) scandal, which is considered the world's largest financial crime. The scandal involved significant debt accumulation over six years and the embezzlement of funds from the sovereign wealth fund.

In the 2023 Thai general election, Pannika worked as a campaign assistant for the Move Forward Party.

=== Member of Parliament ===
1. 2019 Thai general election, party-list, under the Future Forward Party

== Criticisms ==
Pannika was criticized for her attire in parliament on two occasions. The first time, she wore a POEM outfit that shaded from white to black. Porntip Rojanasunan criticized this, stating that mourning attire should be all black. Pannika responded that her suit was appropriate for the occasion.

The second instance involved wearing traditional Thai attire in parliament, which Pareena Kraikupt claimed was inappropriate. However, Thanikan Pornpongsaroj, the spokesperson for the House of Representatives' drafting committee, clarified that wearing traditional Thai attire in parliament was not against the rules. The Speaker had not specified a dress code, and the regulations allowed for international business attire, royal attire, or attire determined by the Speaker, without prohibiting traditional Thai attire.

== Lifetime political ban ==
In 2010, a photo of Pannika and her university friends holding an image of King Bhumibol Adulyadej surfaced, with a caption stating, "No caption needed." Pannika later posted about the photo, explaining that it reflected the experiences of many young people who grew up during the coup era and sometimes made jokes about political tragedies. She acknowledged that the photo was inappropriate and urged others not to use the monarchy as a political tool. This led to a complaint being filed in court to determine whether the photo insulted the monarchy.

On 20 September 2023, Pannika was handed a lifetime ban from politics by the Supreme Court of Thailand, ruling that the photo was inappropriate in relation to the Thai monarchy and thus gave rise to a violation of ethical standards for politicians.

Pannika commented that the ruling did not change much for her. Initially, she had planned to wait six years to return to politics after her first disqualification, but now she no longer needed to wait. She affirmed that her role, from the Future Forward era to the present, would remain unchanged. If the Move Forward Party still supports her in the next general election, she will continue to assist with campaigning and provide political commentary online. She emphasized that her goal in politics is not just to be an MP or a minister but to drive change for the country, and she will continue to do so outside of parliament.
