= Thai Local Power Party =

Thai political party

Thai Local Power Party พรรคพลังท้องถิ่นไท
- Leader: Somyot Luksomboon
- Secretary-General: Jiraphan Pimsawang
- Founded: 30 March 2012; 12 years ago
- Ideology: Localism
- Colours: green
- House of Representatives: 0 / 500

The Thai Local Power Party (TLP; Thai: พรรคพลังท้องถิ่นไท, RTGS: Phak Phalang Thongthin Thai) is a Thai political party that was founded on 30 March 2012 under the name Thong Thin Thai (TTT; Thai: พรรคท้องถิ่นไทย), with Chatchawal Kong-udom, or Chat Taopoon, former Bangkok Senator and former executive editor of Siam Rath newspaper, as the founder and Seksorn Homrak as the first leader of the party. Later, in an extraordinary general meeting of the party on 24 March 2014, the party changed the party regulations, including changing the party's name to "Thai Local Power".

On Friday 2 November 2018, the party held an extraordinary meeting of the party at Pathumthani Place Hotel to select a new party executive committee, where Chatchawal was elected to the position of party leader, Chuenchob Kong-udom, Chatchawan's son, was elected party spokesman, and Rattaphoom "Film" Thokhongsub, a famous singer-actor, was elected deputy party spokesman. The committee also elected Kriangkrai Phoom-laochaeng as deputy leader of the party and Thirasak Panichwit as party secretary.

In the 2019 general election, the Thai Local Power Party won 3 members of the House of Representatives and joined the government coalition led by Phalang Pracharath. Subsequently, on 12 July 2019, Rattaphoom resigned from the position of deputy party spokesperson and left the Thai Local Power Party due to disagreements with its ideology. He later joined Pheu Thai, an opposition party.
