= Sira Jenjaka =

Thai politician (born 1964)

- สิระ เจนจาคะ

Member of the 25th House of Representatives

Personal details
- Born: 5 January 1964 (age 62)
- Party: Palang Pracharath Party
- Education: Krirk University

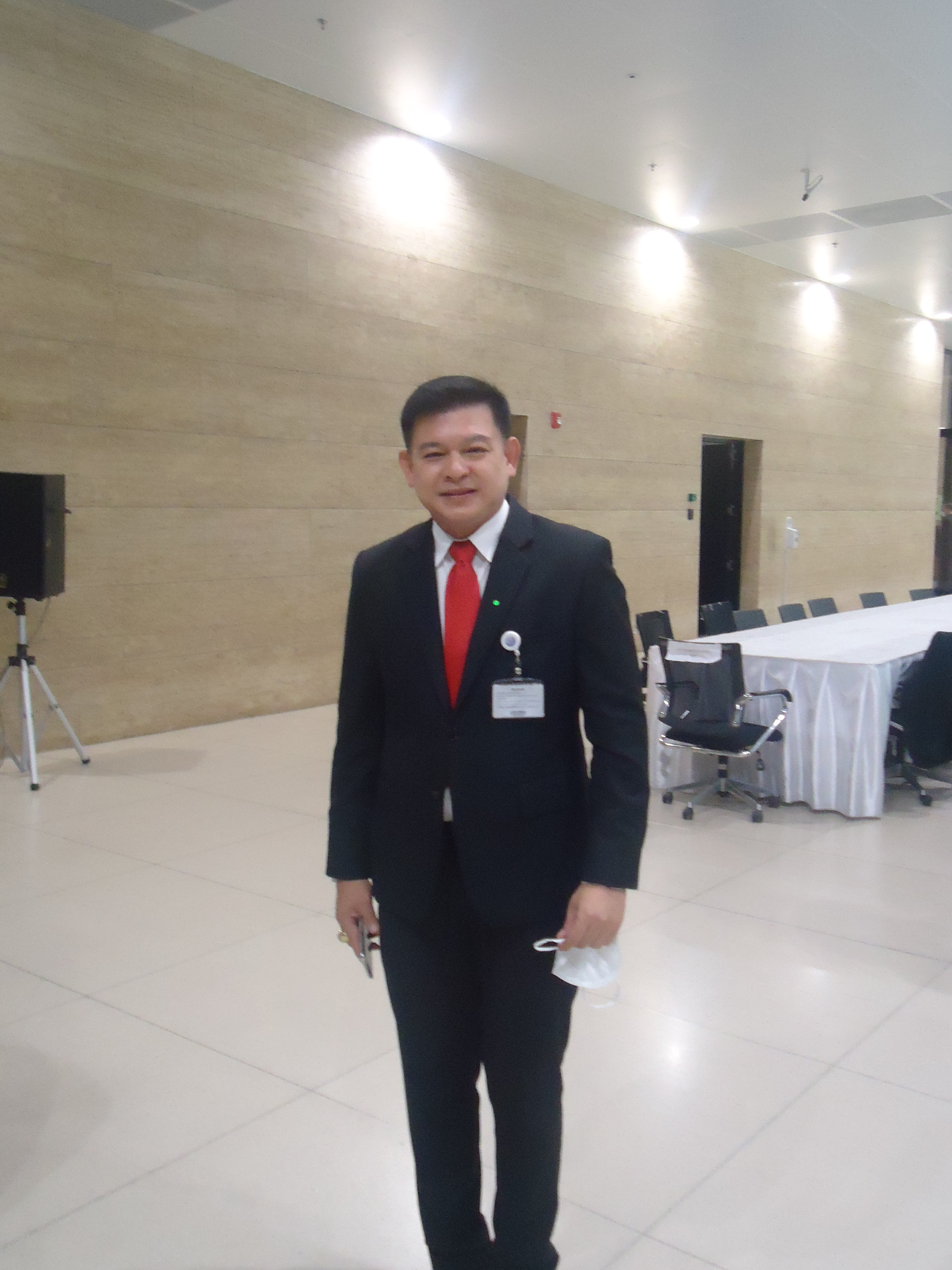
Sira Jenjaka

Sira Jenjaka (Thai: สิระ เจนจาคะ; born 5 January 1964) is a Thai politician. In 2019, he was elected to the 25th House of Representatives of the National Assembly of Thailand.

He was a member of the anti-corruption panel of the House of Representatives. He left the panel after disagreements with the panel’s chairman Sereepisuth Temeeyaves.

In January 2021, the Constitutional Court received a petition for him to be removed from parliament because of an alleged prior fraud conviction, which would mean he was not eligible to seek election during the 2019 Thai general election. The court upheld the petition, which led to his removal and a one-year prison term in 2025.
