= Krirk University =

University in Bangkok, Thailand

Coordinates: 13.8734°N 100.600°E

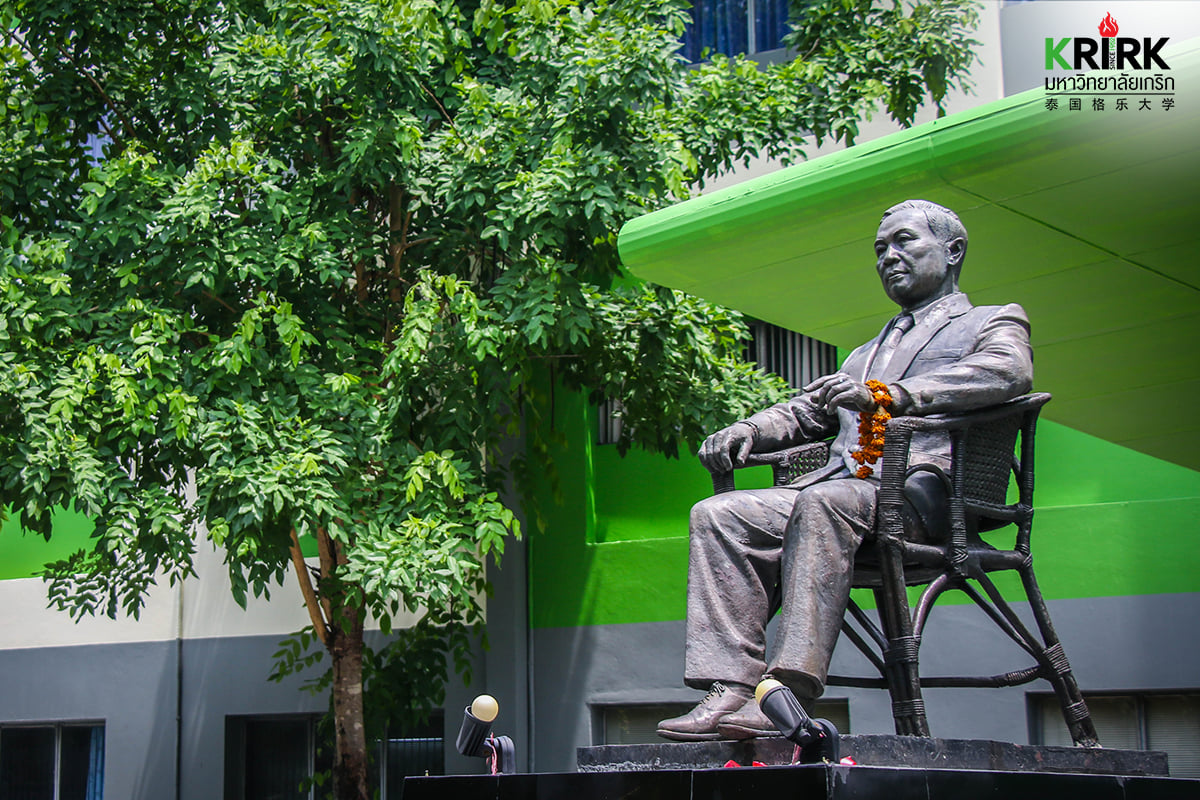
- Other names: KRU
- Motto: Knowledge Brings Confidence
- Type: Private
- Established: 1952
- President: Krasae Chanawongse
- Location: Ramindra Rd., Bang Khen, Bangkok, Thailand
- Colours: Green and White
- Website: krirk.ac.th
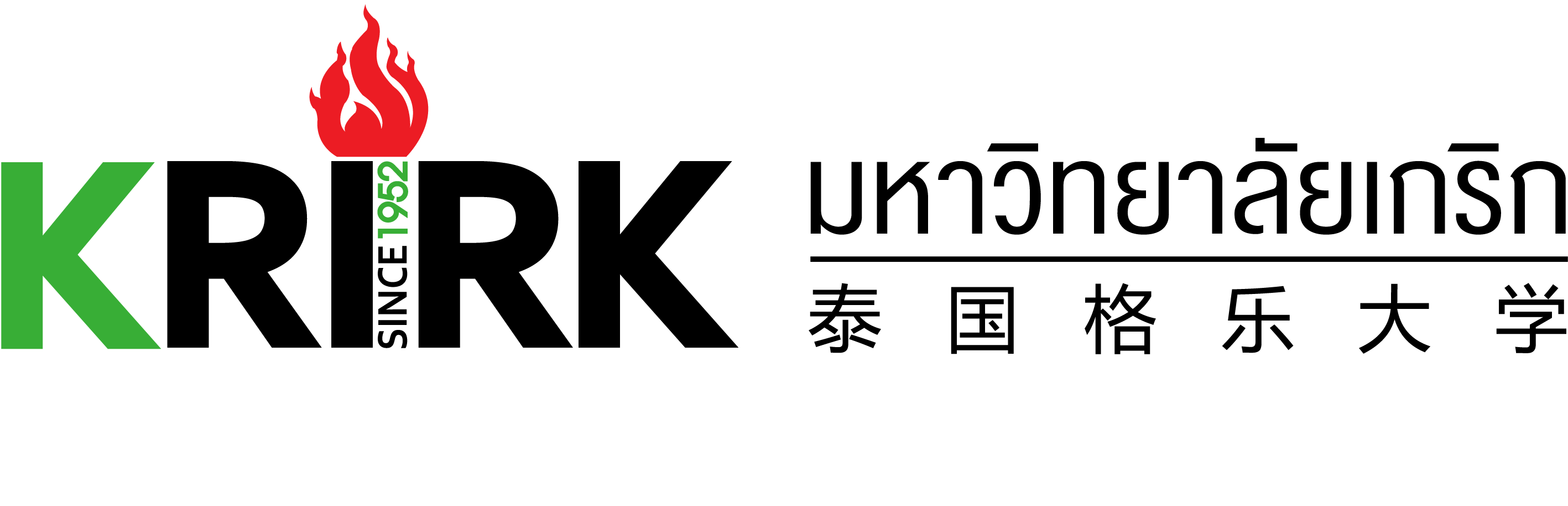

Krirk University (Thai: มหาวิทยาลัยเกริก) is a university in Bang Khen District, Bangkok, Thailand. Founded as the Languages and Professions School in 1952, it was named after its founder, Dr. Krirk Mangkhlaphrik. It was upgraded to an institute of higher education in 1970 as the Institute of Social Technology (Krirk) and then upgraded to university status in 1995. The university today is organized into three faculties, the International College, the School of Political Communications and the International Islamic College.

== Faculties ==
There are three faculties and four colleges:

- Faculty of Business Administration,
- Faculty of Liberal Arts and
- Faculty of Law.

There are four colleges

- International College,
- Political Communications College
- International Islamic College
- China International Language and Culture College

University rankings

Regional – Overall
- QS Asia: 141 (2025)

== Academic programs ==
Krirk University offers bachelor's degrees, master's degrees and doctoral degrees in Thai, Chinese and English. The university is also a regional leader in Chinese language education and in promoting Chinese culture. In 2022, it opened the Krirk University Branch of the Nishan World Centre for Confucian Studies.

The university publishes three academic journals, including the ASEAN Journal of Research.

== Notable alumni ==
- Sira Jenjaka (th) Member of Palang Pracharath Party Parliament of Bangkok
- Mario Maurer actor and model
- Chintara Sukapatana actor
