= Kasidej Chutimant =

Thai politician and business executive

Kasidej Chutimant DM TCh
- กษิดิ์เดช ชุติมันต์

Member of the House of Representatives
- In office 2019–2022
- Monarch: Maha Vajiralongkorn

Bangkok Metropolitan Councillor
- In office 2006–2014
- Monarch: Bhumibol Adulyadej

Personal details
- Born: January 8, 1965 (age 61)
- Party: Bhumjaithai (2022–present)
- Other political affiliations: Palang Pracharat (2019–2022); Democrat (2006–2018)
- Education: Suan Sunanta Rajabhat University (PhD, Communication Arts); Ramkhamhaeng University (MA, Political Science); Chandrakasem Rajabhat University (BEd, English)
- Website: ohmlatphrao.com

Kasidej Chutimant (Thai: กษิดิ์เดช ชุติมันต์; born 8 January 1965) is a Thai politician and business executive. He served as a member of the 25th House of Representatives.

== Education and business career ==
After his schooling at Suankularb Wittayalai School, he earned a bachelor's degree from Chandrakasem Rajabhat University, a master's degree from Ramkhamhaeng University, and a doctorate in Communication Arts from Suan Sunanta Rajabhat University.

Before entering politics, he has worked in the private sector in various roles, such as executive director, civil engineering consultant, marketing analyst and sales manager.

== Political career ==
Kasidej began his political career with the Democrat Party in 2006 as a member of the Bangkok Metropolitan Council, serving two consecutive terms from 2006 to 2014. His political career was interrupted by the 2014 Thai coup d'état. The National Council for Peace and Order (NCPO) assumed control of the government. They instituted a series of measures, including the suspension of the country's constitution and the dissolution of the national legislature, which consequently affected the Bangkok Metropolitan Council where Kasidej was serving.

Following the lifting of the ban on political activities, Kasidej decided to return to politics when general elections were called in 2019. He joined the Palang Pracharath Party and ran for a position in the House of Representatives and was elected.

While in the House of Representatives, Kasidej served as the Spokesperson of the Commission on Court Affairs, Independent Organizations, Public Prosecutor Organizations, State Enterprises, Public Organizations and Funds (Thai: โฆษกคณะกรรมาธิการ กมธ. กิจการศาล องค์กรอิสระ องค์กรอัยการ รัฐวิสาหกิจ องค์การมหาชน และกองทุน สภาผู้แทนฯ). He also played the role of the Extraordinary Commissioner considering the construction project of the new parliament building and extending the expressway and skytrain (BTS) concession contract (Thai: กรรมาธิการ กมธ.วิสามัญ พิจารณาศึกษาการขยายสัญญาสัมปทานทางด่วนและรถไฟฟ้า (บีทีเอส) สภาผู้แทนฯ).

He also participated in the Special Committee to monitor and audit the expenditure of borrowed funds intended to resolve economic and social issues stemming from the 2019 Coronavirus (COVID-19) pandemic (Thai: คณะกรรมาธิการวิสามัญเพื่อพิจารณาติดตามและตรวจสอบการใช้จ่ายเงินจากการกู้เงินตามพระราชกำหนดให้อำนาจกระทรวงการคลังกู้เงินเพื่อแก้ไขปัญหาเศรษฐกิจและสังคม จากการระบาดของโรคติดเชื้อไวรัสโคโรนา 2019). He also contributed to the Special Committee for the Consideration of the Life Partnership Bill (Thai: คณะกรรมาธิการวิสามัญพิจารณาร่างพระราชบัญญัติคู่ชีวิต), advocating for the rights and recognition of the LGBTQ+ community. This bill aimed at providing legal status to same-sex relationships, marking a significant step forward in achieving equality for the LGBTQ+ community in Thailand.

Kasidej moved to Bhumjaithai Party in late 2022 and ran in the 2023 Thai general election but was not elected, finishing in the fifth place.

== Honours ==
=== Royal decorations ===
- Thailand:
  - Knight Commander (Second Class) of the Most Noble Order of the Crown of Thailand (2020)
  - Commander (Third Class) of the Most Exalted Order of the White Elephant (2012)
