= Pareena Kraikupt =

Thai politician (born 1976)

Pareena Kraikupt MWM PCh
- ปารีณา ไกรคุปต์
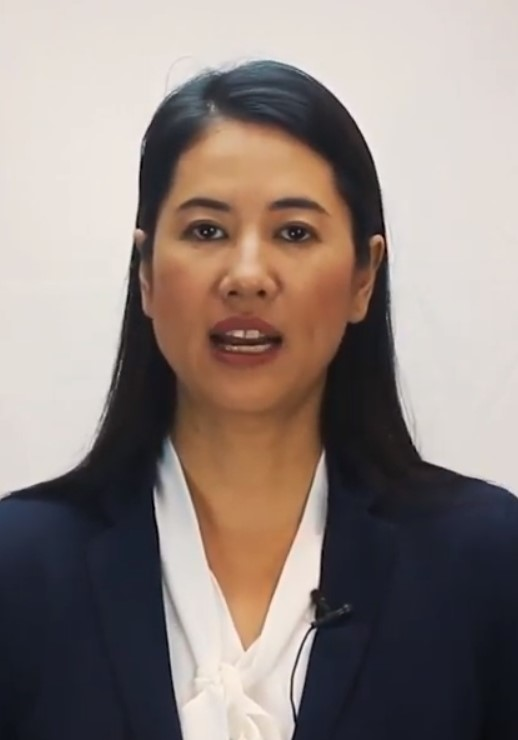
- Pareena in 2020

Member of the 25th House of Representatives (Note: Suspended since 10 February 2021.)
- In office 29 March 2019 – 25 March 2022

Personal details
- Born: 19 May 1976 (age 49) Ratchaburi Province, Thailand
- Other political affiliations: Phalang Pracharat Party (2018–2022); Pheu Thai Party (2014); Chartthaipattana Party (2008–2013); Chart Thai Party (2007–2008); Thai Rak Thai Party (2005–2006)
- Spouse: Upakit Pachariyangkun (div.)
- Children: 3
- Parents: Thawee Kraikupt (father); Siribangorn Kraikupt (mother)

Pareena Kraikupt (Thai: ปารีณา ไกรคุปต์, RTGS: Parina Kraikhup; born 19 May 1976) is a former Thai politician and Member of Parliament for Ratcha Buri Province. She was elected to the 25th House of Representatives of the National Assembly of Thailand as a Phalang Pracharat Party member. On 10 February 2021, she was suspended as a Member of Parliament for trespassing on national forest reserves. Her MP status was replaced by her old rival, Chaithip Kamolpanthip, from the Democrat Party in the by-election shortly after.

== Early life and political career ==
Kraikupt was born in Ratchaburi Province on 19 May 1976. She is daughter of Thawee and Siribangorn Kraikupt. Her father served as a Member of Parliament for Ratcha Buri Province. She married Upakit Pachariyangkun, and they have three children. Her nickname is Ae (เอ๋).

She participated in the 2001 Miss Thailand pageant, where she earned a Miss Congeniality title. She began her political career with the Thai Rak Thai Party in 2005 and contested the 2005 Thai general election and became elected. After that, she left to join the Pheu Thai Party, and later joined with Phalang Pracharat Party from 2019 to 2022.

== Criticism ==
She is often critical of actions adverse to her. In 2019, she called Pannika Wanich who is spokesperson of Future Forward Party with inappropriate wording. The hashtag "#ปารีณาค้าอาวุธ" (Pareena was arms dealer) trended on Twitter in Thailand at that moment.

On 5 October 2019, she posted in her Facebook account for referred about suicide of Khanakorn Pianchana. In 2020, she opposed with Panadda Wongphoodee who is Miss Thailand in 2000, which people are believed to distraction in attempted to participation with CPTPP by Thai government.

On 10 February 2021, the Supreme Court accepted the National Anti-Corruption Commission (NACC)’s lawsuit against her and she suspended the Member of Parliament from her duties on national forest reserves.

== Personal life ==
In April 2024, she revealed the death of her father Thawee Kraikupt.
