= Tassanee Buranupakorn =

Tassanee Buranupakorn (ทัศนีย์ บูรณุปกรณ์, also transliterated Tasanee Buranupakorn, Thasanee Buranupakorn, Tussanee Buranupakorn, Tassanee Buranapakorn) (born March 8, 1972) is a Thai politician who served in the Thai House of Representatives, where she represented the first district of Chiang Mai Province as a member of the Pheu Thai Party for two terms.

Tassanee was first elected in 2011, and served on the 24th Parliament's Committee on Local Administration; however, like all members of the 24th Parliament, her term was truncated by the 2013–2014 Thai political crisis, which led to the parliament being dissolved.

== 2016 arrest ==
On July 26, 2016, several members of the Buranupakorn family and their associates were arrested for having been involved in distributing letters which allegedly misrepresented or were otherwise critical of the draft version of the Thai Constitution, and which sought to dissuade recipients from voting 'yes' in the then-upcoming referendum. Charges included sedition and being part of a political gathering of more than 5 people, as well as insurrection and "conspiring against law enforcement". Tassanee subsequently visited the headquarters of the Royal Thai Police (different sources have stated different reasons for her having done this, including that it was on behalf of her sister Thanthip, who had been among those arrested; that it was in an attempt to "show her [own] innocence"; and that, "after being implicated by a former employee", she visited police "just to find out the charges against her"). After this visit, she was arrested herself, while being interviewed by journalists.

On August 2, Tassanee's lawyer reported that he had been blocked from hearing the accusations against her, and also that another attorney had been appointed to her case, against her will.

On August 26, Tassanee and the other Buranupakorns were released on bail, on the condition that they not leave Thailand or participate in "activities that could cause instability".

On December 19, she and her co-accused were formally indicted; however, the charges were subsequently dismissed.

== Subsequent career ==
Tassanee ran for office again during the 2019 Thai general election, and was re-elected; she ran a third time during the 2023 Thai general election, but was defeated.

In August 2023, she resigned from Pheu Thai and joined the Move Forward Party (MFP); this came in the aftermath of Pheu Thai dissolving its alliance with the MFP and forming a new alliance with Phalang Pracharath and United Thai Nations.

In 2024, she sought to run for the leadership of the Chiang Mai provincial administrative organization, as the MFP candidate, but was not selected by the party.

== Family ==
Tassanee is the niece of Boonlert Buranupakorn, formerly the president of the Chiang Mai provincial administrative organization, Other relatives include her uncle Prapan Buranupakorn, who served in the Senate of Thailand; her uncle Pakorn Buranupakorn, who served in the House of Representatives; her brother Tassanai Buranupakorn, who served as mayor of Chiang Mai from 2009 to 2021; and her cousin Assanee Buranupakorn, who succeeded Tassanai as mayor in 2021.
