= Thawee Kraikupt =

Thai politician (1939–2024)

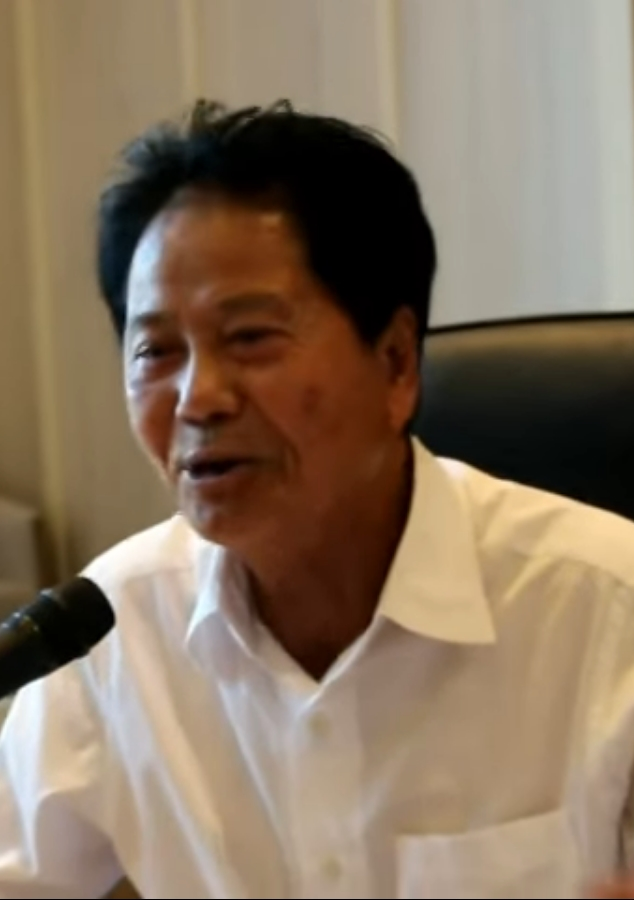
Kraikupt in 2019

Thawee Kraikupt (Thai: ทวี ไกรคุปต์; 29 May 1939 – 19 April 2024) was a Thai politician. He served as Deputy Minister of Commerce (1981–1982), Deputy Minister of Transport (1992–1994) and a member of the House of Representatives (1979–2000). Kraikupt died on 19 April 2024, at the age of 84.

== History ==
Thawee Kraikupt was born on 29 May 1939 in Tambon Chet Samian Photharam District Ratchaburi Province. He was the son of Saeng Kraikupt and Thurian Kraikupt. Graduated from secondary school at Amnuay Silpa School Graduated with a bachelor's degree from Faculty of Engineering, Chulalongkorn University Married to Siribang-on Kraikupt, a former associate judge, has 3 children: Sihadet Kraikupt, former mayor of Bang Ton Don Subdistrict Administrative Organization, Sinat Kraikupt, and Parina Kraikupt, a former member of the House of Representatives, Ratchaburi, for 4 terms.

== Politics ==
Kraikupt entered politics By being a member of the Bangkok Metropolitan Council in 1975 before running for the election of the House of Representatives of Ratchaburi Province and being elected for the first time in 1979, he was elected continuously until 1996. As for the election in 2001, he ran under the name of the Thai Rak Thai Party, but lost to Prapaiphan Saengprasit from the Democrat Party. He later retired and let his daughter, Pareena, run for the election instead.

Kraikupt entered politics by extending the service of General Prem Tinsulanonda. Thawee held a referendum, sending 500,000 postcards. People's opinion is to extend the service. until being appointed as Deputy Minister of Commerce in the government of General Prem Tinsulanonda in 1981 but received benefits from the insurance company until Thawee had to resign and was the Deputy Minister of Transport in the Chuan Leekpai government in 1992 On Thursday, November 22, 2018, Thawee Kraikupt traveled to apply for membership of the Palang Pracharath Party along with Mr. Boonjong Wongtrairat.

=== Members of the House of Representatives ===
Kraikupt was elected as a member of the House of Representatives for a total of 7 terms:

1. Thai general election 1979 Ratchaburi Province under the Siam Prachathipatai Party
2. Thai general election 1983 Ratchaburi Province under the Thai National Party
3. Thai general election 1986 Ratchaburi Province under the Social Action Party
4. Thai general election 1988 Ratchaburi Province under the Social Action Party
5. Thai general election September 1992 Ratchaburi Province Affiliated with New Hope Party
6. 1995 Thai general election Ratchaburi Province Affiliated with Democrat Party
7. 1996 Thai general election Ratchaburi Province Affiliated with Democrat Party

=== After retiring from politics ===
During the 2006 Thai coup, Kraikupt went on a hunger strike at the Democracy Monument, Ratchadamnoen Road, to protest the coup d'état of the National Reform Council for Democratic Reform under the Constitutional Monarchy.

In 2014, Kraikupt joined political activities with the People's Radio for Democracy (PRD) group, supporting the National Democratic Front Against Dictatorship

== Lawsuit ==
=== Acts that damage the dignity of members of the House of Representatives ===
On July 8, 1982, the House of Representatives established a special committee To consider the allegations that Kraikupt has committed acts that are detrimental to the dignity of the House of Representatives due to committing defamation

=== Defamation case of Suthep Thaugsuban ===
Kraikupt was convicted by the Court of First Instance in 2003 on the charge of defaming Suthep Thaugsuban. by publishing an article in Matichon newspaper that Thaugsuban had committed corruption in the Iridium satellite telephone project, sentencing him to 3 months in prison and a fine of 5,000 baht, but the prison sentence was vacated, leaving only the fine. Later, the Appeal Court upheld the lower court's ruling, and the Supreme Court sentenced him to 3 months in prison, suspended for 2 years.

=== Animal cruelty case ===
On March 7, 2016, Kraikupt used a gun to shoot dead a stray dog in front of a 7–11 store in Suan Phueng District. Initial reports indicate that Kraikupt was bitten by the dog when leaving the store, and shot the dog with a gun he retrieved from his car. He was charged with animal cruelty under Section 20 of the Prevention of Cruelty to Animals Act, as well as for carrying a gun in a public place without permission and firing a gun without reasonable cause.

== Death ==
On April 7, 2024, Kraikupt collapsed and was taken to hospital in Suan Phueng. He was transferred to Siriraj Hospital in Bangkok the same day and underwent surgery, after which he was admitted to the intensive care unit. He initially responded to hand movements, but the following day doctors informed his family that he was unresponsive and his brainstem was dead. He was transported to hospital in Ratchaburi where he was put on a ventilator. He died on April 19, aged 84.

On this occasion, His Majesty King Maha Vajiralongkorn Bodindradebayavarangkun bestowed royal water for bathing the body along with the funeral regalia, including a royal urn and an octagonal urn. Chat Bencha is decorated, oboes, and 10 drums are played while receiving the royal bathing water and the chanting of the Abhidhamma for 3 nights. The participants included Napinthorn Srisanpang Deputy Minister of Commerce / Chaithawat Tulathon Leader of the Opposition / Manit Nopamornbodi Former Deputy Minister of Public Health / Police General Sereepisuth Temeeyaves former Commander-in-Chief of the Royal Thai Police / General Prawit Wongsuwan Former Deputy Prime Minister of Thailand
