= New Economics Party (Thailand) =

Political party in Thailand

New Economics Party พรรคเศรษฐกิจใหม่
- Abbreviation: NEP
- Leader: Manoon Sivapiromrat
- Secretary-General: Passakorn Ngerncharoenkul
- Founder: Supadit Arkartruek
- Founded: 2 March 2018
- Headquarters: 199 Naradhiwat Rajanagarindra Rd, Chong Nonsi, Yan Nawa, Bangkok 10120
- Ideology: Social conservatism Economic liberalism
- Political position: Centre-right
- House of Representatives: 0 / 500

The New Economics Party (NEP) (Thai: พรรคเศรษฐกิจใหม่) is a political party in Thailand founded in March 2018 by Supadit Arkartruek.

The party first gained parliamentary representation in the 2019 general election, securing 6 seats through the party-list system. Initially, NEP joined the opposition bloc, but later shifted to support the governing coalition.

== History ==
The New Economics Party was registered on March 2, 2018, and formally approved by the Election Commission of Thailand (ECT) on November 6, 2018.

In 2019, the party nominated Mingkwan Saengsuwan as its prime ministerial candidate, and its platform focused on economic reforms and social stability.

== Election results ==
Election	Total seats won	Popular vote	Share of votes	Outcome of election	Election leader
2019	6 / 500	485,664	1.34%	Entered Parliament — initially in opposition, later joined governing coalition	Mingkwan Saengsuwan
2023	0 / 500	N/A	N/A	Lost all seats, no parliamentary representation	Manoon Sivapiromrat

== Leadership ==
List of party leaders
No.	Name	Term start	Term end	Notes
1	Supadit Arkartruek	March 2018	January 2019	Founding leader
2	Mingkwan Saengsuwan	January 2019	May 2019	Resigned after election
3	Manoon Sivapiromrat	December 2021	Present	Current leader

== Policies and Ideology ==
The NEP promotes economic liberalism and social conservatism, advocating for:

- Pro-business policies to attract foreign investment
- Welfare programs for low-income citizens
- Judicial reforms to enhance public trust in institutions

== Controversies ==
In 2020, internal disputes arose when some MPs voted against opposition-backed motions, leading to accusations of backdoor deals with the ruling coalition. This conflict contributed to the resignation of Mingkwan Saengsuwan.
