= Chatchawal Kong-udom =

Thai business tycoon and politician

Chatchawal Kong-udom (Thai: ชัชวาลล์ คงอุดม, born 12 November 1943), also known as Chat Taopoon (ชัช เตาปูน), is a Thai business tycoon and politician. He is known as a chao pho (godfather) in Bangkok's underground gambling industry, and is an influential local figure in the Tao Pun area of Bangkok's Bang Sue district. He served as an elected senator for Bangkok from 2000 to 2006, and headed the Siam Rath newspaper.

He recounted his background, saying that he was born beside the railway adjacent to the viaduct leading toward Chatuchak — locally known as Saphan Dam (สะพานดำ, "the black bridge") — at a time when the surrounding landscape was nothing more than a solitary, open rice field. Today, that area falls within the Bang Sue district.

His father served as a finance officer in the Directorate of Aeronautical Engineering (DAE). In his childhood, he accompanied his father on walks through their neighbourhood, during which his father impressed upon him the importance of never initiating aggression yet standing firm and defending himself if bullied. This ethos has guided and shaped him continuously to the present-day.

Chatchawal founded the Thai Local Power Party in 2012. It contested the 2019 general election, and is expected to win two or three party-list seats according to unofficial calculations.
