= Siam Rath =

Thai daily newspaper

- Niggaṇhe niggahārahaṃ, paggaṇhe paggahārahaṃ. (นิคฺคณฺเห นิคฺคหารหํ ปคฺคณฺเห ปคฺคหารหํ; transl. Adore those who deserve to be adored, oppress those who deserve to be oppressed.)

- Type: Daily Newspaper (until 2025); Online newspaper (since 2025)
- Format: Broadsheet (1950–2025)
- Owner: Chatchawal Kong-udom
- Founded: 25 June 1950
- Ceased publication: 30 August 2025 (print)
- Political alignment: Center-right, Conservatism
- Language: Thai
- Website: https://siamrath.co.th/

Siam Rath (Thai: สยามรัฐ, RTGS: Sayam Rat, pronounced [sā.jǎːm rát]; lit.: 'Siamese State') was a Thai newspaper printed from 1950 to 2025, and since then operating as a news website.

The paper was founded on 25 June 1950, and was one of the most politically influential newspapers during the latter half of the twentieth century. It was closely associated with former prime minister Kukrit Pramoj, who was the newspaper's co-founder and, for various periods, its owner, director, editor, and columnist. The newspaper positioned itself as a "quality" paper, like the more widely circulated Matichon. Following Kukrit's death in 1995, the paper was sold to Chatchawal Kong-udom. At the time of its closure in 2025, it was the oldest and longest continuously published Thai-language daily newspaper.

Siam Rath Daily published its last issue on August 29, 2025, while its sister publication, Siam Rath Weekly had published its last issue on August 30, 2025.
