= Mingkwan Saengsuwan =

Thai politician (born 1952)

- มิ่งขวัญ แสงสุวรรณ์
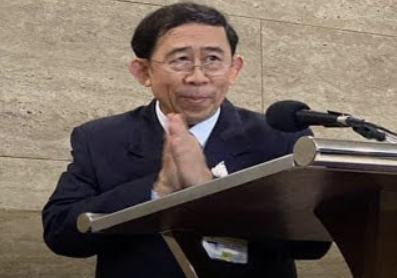

Deputy Prime Minister of Thailand
- In office 6 February 2008 – 2 August 2008
- Prime Minister: Samak Sundaravej

Minister of Industry
- In office 2 August 2008 – 9 September 2008
- Prime Minister: Samak Sundaravej
- Preceded by: Suwit Khunkitti
- Succeeded by: Pracha Promnok

Minister of Commerce
- In office 6 February 2008 – 2 August 2008
- Prime Minister: Samak Sundaravej
- Preceded by: Krirkkrai Jirapaet
- Succeeded by: Chaiya Sasomsap

Personal details
- Born: 5 February 1952 (age 74) Bangkok, Thailand
- Party: Palang Pracharath Party
- Other political affiliations: People's Power Party (2007–2008); Pheu Thai Party (2008–2013); New Economics Party (2019–2022); Okas Thai (2022)
- Education: Chulalongkorn University; University of Pennsylvania

Mingkwan Saengsuwan (Thai: มิ่งขวัญ แสงสุวรรณ์, born 5 February 1952) is a Thai politician. In 2008, he served as Deputy Prime Minister of Thailand and as Minister of Commerce.

== Early life and education ==
Mingkwan was born on 5 February 1952 in Bangkok, but grew up in the northern region, Chiang Rai. He is the youngest child Of the three siblings, he graduated high school from Wat Nuannoradit School. He received a bachelor's degree in law from Chulalongkorn University and a certificate in Executive Development Program from Wharton School of the University of Pennsylvania, United States.

He started working as a salesperson with Toyota Motors Thailand Co., Ltd. later moved up to the marketing department. It is said that Mingkwan is the only employee among the 70,000 employees of the entire Toyota Group that can skip from department manager immediately become a director without being in accordance with Japanese administrative customs is arranged in order of seniority and job class.

Later, during the Thaksin Shinawatra government, Mingkwan had the opportunity to help Somkid Jatusripitak Deputy Prime Minister in Economic Affairs and the Minister of Finance at that time by being a consultant about tourism.

Mingkwan was chosen to hold office Director of the Mass Communication Organization of Thailand (MCOT) by starting work from the reform Thai color TV station, Channel 9, from the old era has become a modern television station in the name of Modern Nine TV until leading to privatization MCOT from government organizations became a state-owned public broadcaster. Mingkwan was one of those who resisted the 2006 Thai coup d'état under the direction of Prime Minister Thaksin by helping Thaksin issue a declaration of state emergency in Bangkok via long-distance mobile phone from abroad broadcast on MCOT.

== Political careers ==
In 2007, the People's Power Party approach him to be Head of the Party's Economic Working Group and on 6 February 2008, Mingkwan took office as Deputy Prime Minister for Economic Affairs and Minister of Commerce in the Cabinet of Prime Minister Samak Sundaravej. Then Mingkwan joined and served as head of the New Economics Party to apply for a 2019 Thai general election.

He is also a former leader of the New Economics Party. On 8 June 2022, Mingkwan formed a new party called Okas Thai (Thai Opportunity).

On 6 December 2022, he launched with the Palang Pracharath Party as the head of the economic policy team, and is one of the candidates for Prime Minister from the party's nomination in the general elections in early 2023 as well.
