= Jirayu Huangsab =

Thai politician

- จิรายุ ห่วงทรัพย์
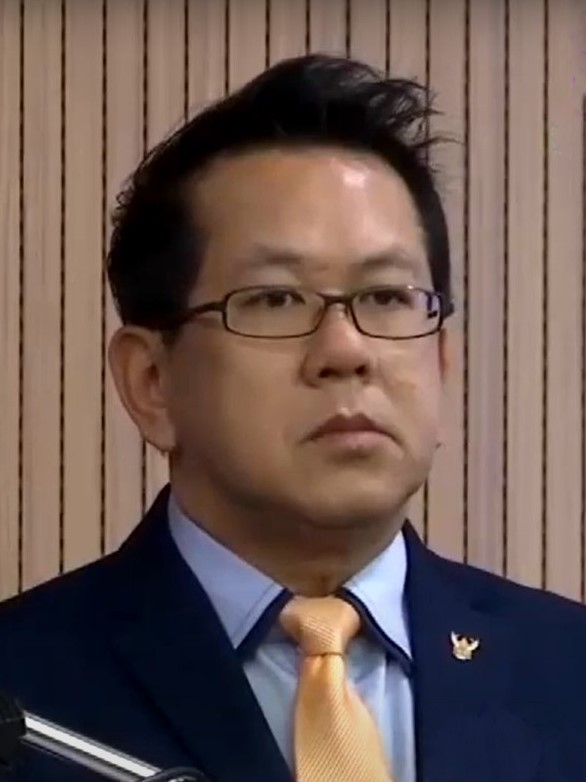

Spokesperson of the Office of the Prime Minister
- Incumbent
- Assumed office 8 October 2024
- Prime Minister: Paetongtarn Shinawatra

Jirayu Huangsab (Thai: จิรายุ ห่วงทรัพย์, also spelled Jirayu Houngsub (Note: RTGS: Chirayu Huangsap; other spellings include Jirayu Huangsap.)) is a Thai politician who is the Spokesperson of the Office of the Prime Minister of Thailand and advisor to Prime Minister Paetongtarn Shinawatra since 2024.

== Career ==
Jirayu previously served as spokesperson and member of parliament for the Pheu Thai Party, and as a spokesperson for Thailand's Ministry of Defense.

On 17 September 2024, Jirayu was appointed as an advisor to Paetongtarn Shinawatra and subsequently as spokesperson for the Thai Government. Jirayu oversaw communications from the government following the October flooding and landslides in the Chiang Mai area.
