= Suchart Tancharoen =

Thai politician (born 1958)

- สุชาติ ตันเจริญ
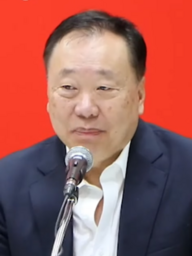
- Suchart in 2023

Deputy Speaker of the House of Representatives of Thailand
- In office 28 May 2019 – 20 March 2023 Serving with Suphachai Phosu
- Preceded by: Charoen Jankomol
- Succeeded by: Padipat Suntiphada
- In office 7 March 2005 – 24 February 2006 Serving with Lalita Lerksamran
- Preceded by: Somsak Kiatsuranont
- Succeeded by: Somsak Prissanananthakul

Deputy Minister of Interior
- In office 17 April 1992 – 10 June 1992
- Prime Minister: Suchinda Kraprayoon
- In office 18 July 1995 – 23 May 1996
- Prime Minister: Banharn Silpa-archa

Personal details
- Born: 11 February 1958 (age 68)
- Party: Pheu Thai Party

Suchart Tancharoen (Thai: สุชาติ ตันเจริญ, RTGS: Suchat Tancharoen; born 11 February 1958) is a Thai politician from the Pheu Thai Party. He is former First Deputy Speaker of the House of Representatives.

== Political career ==
Suchart Tancharoen is a 9 times member of the House of Representatives from Chachoengsao. He used to be in many political parties, including the Democrat Party, Samakkhitham Party, Thai National Party, Thai Rak Thai Party He served as Deputy Minister of Interior in 1992 and 1995 and became Deputy Speaker of the House of Representatives in 2005 and 2019.

He previously held the position of deputy leader of two political parties: Thai Nation Party and the Thai Rak Thai Party. In 2007, he was suspended from political activity for 5 years because he was an executive committees of the Thai Rak Thai Party, which was dissolved in the 2006. His group moved to the Puea Pandin Party and in 2010 moved to join political activities with the Bhumjaithai Party.

on November 23, 2018, Suchart led more than 40 members of his Baan Rim Nam group to apply for membership in the Palang Pracharat Party and elected to be the First Deputy Speaker of the House of Representatives after the 2019 general election. He join Pheu Thai Party in 2023

== Honours ==
Suchart has received the following royal decorations in the Honours System of Thailand:

- 1999 - Knight Grand Cordon (Special Class) of the Most Exalted Order of the White Elephant
- 1996 - Knight Grand Cordon (Special Class) of The Most Noble Order of the Crown of Thailand
