= Suphachai Phosu =

Thai politician (born 1958)

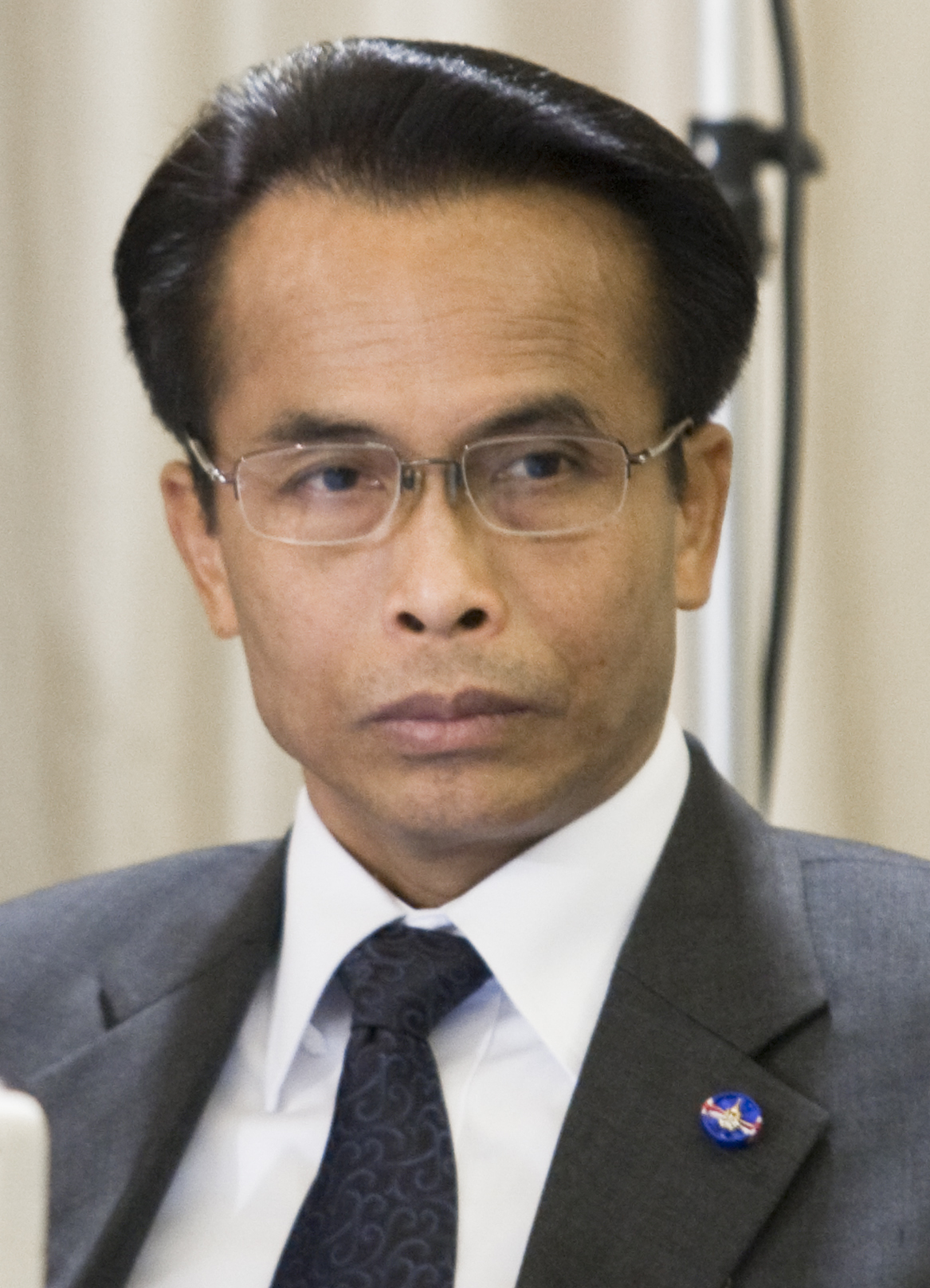
Suphachai Phosu in 2008.

Suphachai Phosu (born 1 January 1958; nickname: Kaew) is a Thai politician from the Bhumjaithai Party. He is currently serving as Second Deputy Speaker of the House of Representatives.
