= 2026 Thai House of Representatives =

27th House of Representatives of Thailand
←	26th	28th	→
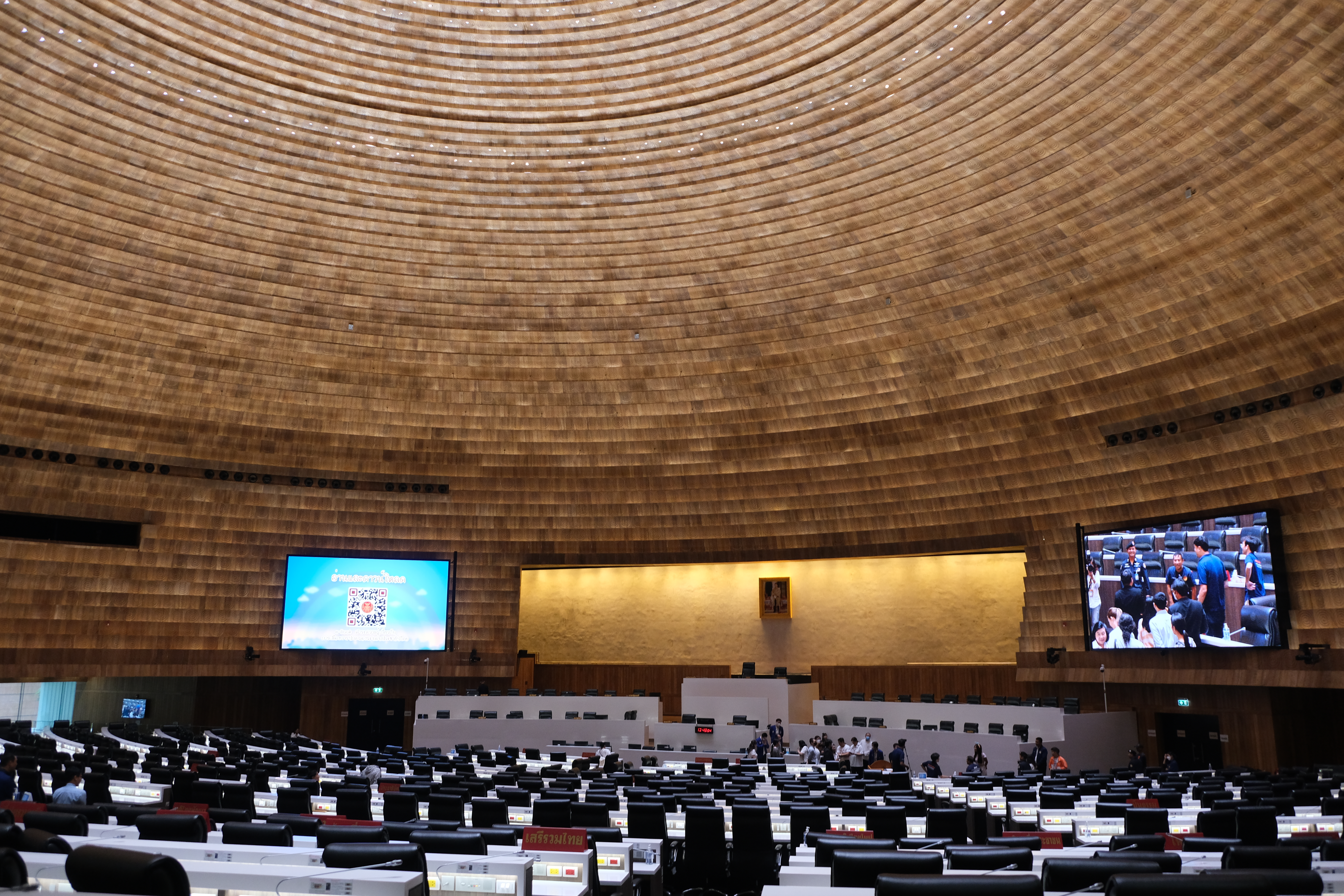
- Phra Suriyan Chamber, Sappaya-Sapasathan

Overview
- Legislative body: National Assembly of Thailand
- Meeting place: Sappaya-Sapasathan
- Term: 8 February 2026 –
- Election: 2026 Thai general election
- Government: Second Anutin cabinet

House of Representatives
- Members: 500
- Speaker: Sophon Saram
- First Deputy Speaker: Mallika Jiraphanwanich
- Second Deputy Speaker: Lertsak Pattanachaikul
- Prime Minister: Anutin Charnvirakul
- Leader of the Opposition: Natthaphong Ruengpanyawut

Monarch Vajiralongkorn

Sessions
- 1st: 14 March 2026 – 11 July 2026
- 2nd: 25 August 2026 –

The House of Representatives of Thailand of 2026 consists of 500 members elected in the 8 February 2026 general election.

Parliament was officially opened by King Vajiralongkorn on 14 March 2026. The Speaker of the House was elected the following day.

== House of Representatives composition ==
Affiliation	Members		
Affiliation	pre-Election	Elected	Change
Bhumjaithai	71	192	▲121
People's	143	120	▼23
Pheu Thai	140	74	▼67
Kla Tham	26	58	▲32
Democrat	25	21	▼4
Palang Pracharath	20	5	▼15
United Thai Nation	36	2	▼34
Chart Thai Pattana	10	10	Steady
Prachachat	9	9	Steady
Thai Sang Thai	6	6	Steady
Chart Pattana	2	3	▲1
Thai Ruam Palang	2	2	Steady
Fair Party	1	1	Steady
Thai Liberal	1	1	Steady
New Democracy	1	1	Steady
New Party	1	1	Steady
Thai Progress	0	1	▲1
Independent (Note: Under Thai law, a member of the House of Representatives must be officially affiliated with a political party. However, if for any reason their party membership is rescinded, they can be without a party for up to thirty days. During the thirty days, they must find a new party to affiliate with or their membership of parliament will end.)	0	0	Steady
Total	500	499	▲4
Vacant	N/A	1	▼4
Government majority	N/A	293	▲293

=== Constituencies ===
==== Bangkok Metropolitan ====
People's (56) Bhumjaithai (9) Pheu Thai (1) Kla Tham (1)

District	Elected MP	Party	Notes
Bangkok 1	Paramait Vithayaruksun	People's	
Bangkok 2	Seksit Yaemsanguansak	People's	
Bangkok 3	Chorayuth Chaturapornprasit	People's	
Bangkok 4	Bhuntin Noumjerm	People's	
Bangkok 5	Pitikorn Bunpaesat	People's	
Bangkok 6	Kantapon Duangamporn	People's	
Bangkok 7	Patsarin Ramwong	People's	
Bangkok 8	Chayaphon Satondee	People's	
Bangkok 9	Suphanat Minchainant	People's	
Bangkok 10	Ekkarach Udomumnuay	People's	
Bangkok 11	Sasinan Thamnithinan	People's	
Bangkok 12	Puriwat Chaisamran	People's	
Bangkok 13	Tanadej Pengsuk	People's	
Bangkok 14	Korkiat Korsoongsak	People's	
Bangkok 15	Vittawat Tichawanich	People's	
Bangkok 16	Pimkarn Kiratiwirapakorn	People's	
Bangkok 17	Weerawut Rukthieng	People's	
Bangkok 18	Teerajchai Phuntumas	People's	
Bangkok 19	Kanphong Prayoonsak	People's	
Bangkok 20	Chumphon Lakkham	People's	
Bangkok 21	Nuttapong Premphunsawad	People's	
Bangkok 22	Supakon Tangtiphaiboontana	People's	
Bangkok 23	Chonlathan Supphaiboonlerd	People's	
Bangkok 24	Napat Jittapinankanta	People's	
Bangkok 25	Annsiri Walaikanok	People's	
Bangkok 26	Pongsoranat Thonglee	People's	
Bangkok 27	Naruephon Loetpanyarot	People's	
Bangkok 28	Chonlanat Koaykul	People's	
Bangkok 29	Tissarat Laohaphol	People's	
Bangkok 30	Thunyatorn Thaninwattanatorn	People's	
Bangkok 31	Anusorn Tamajai	People's	
Bangkok 32	Pawitra Jittakit	People's	
Bangkok 33	Taopiphop Limjittrakorn	People's	
Nakhon Pathom 1	Supachok Srisukajon	Bhumjaithai	
Nakhon Pathom 2	Sinthop Kaewphichit	Kla Tham	
Nakhon Pathom 3	Panuwat Sasomsub	Bhumjaithai	
Nakhon Pathom 4	Sukchart Sasomsap	Bhumjaithai	
Nakhon Pathom 5	Anucha Sasomsub	Bhumjaithai	
Nakhon Pathom 6	Chonpruksak Wongarunniyom	People's	
Nonthaburi 1	Surapan Waiyakorn	People's	
Nonthaburi 2	Panyarat Nantaphusitanon	People's	
Nonthaburi 3	Anusorn Keawwichien	People's	
Nonthaburi 4	Noppon Tippayachon	People's	
Nonthaburi 5	Preeti Charoensin	People's	
Nonthaburi 6	Kunakorn Munnateerai	People's	
Nonthaburi 7	Kiatikun Tonyang	People's	
Nonthaburi 8	Non Paisanlimcharoenkit	People's	
Pathum Thani 1	Jesada Dontrisanoh	People's	
Pathum Thani 2	Supachai Nopkham	Pheu Thai	
Pathum Thani 3	Chonthicha Jaengraew	People's	
Pathum Thani 4	Sakon Suntornwanitkit	People's	
Pathum Thani 5	Chetawan Tueprakhon	People's	
Pathum Thani 6	Chetawan Thuaprakhon	People's	
Pathum Thani 7	Phitsanu Phonthi	Bhumjaithai	
Pathum Thani 8	Pornpimol Thammasan	Bhumjaithai	
Samut Prakan 1	Panida Mongkonsawat	People's	
Samut Prakan 2	Ratchanok Sukprasert	People's	
Samut Prakan 3	Pichai Changjanyawong	People's	
Samut Prakan 4	Wuttinan Boonchoo	People's	
Samut Prakan 5	Nittaya Meesri	People's	
Samut Prakan 6	Thapakorn Kujiaroen	Bhumjaithai	
Samut Prakan 7	Boonlert Saengpan	People's	
Samut Prakan 8	Thepparit Pasee	People's	
Samut Sakhon 1	Nattapon Sumanotham	People's	
Samut Sakhon 2	Annusorn Kraiwatnusorn	Bhumjaithai	
Samut Sakhon 3	Sirirot Tanikkun	People's	
Samut Sakhon 4	Panya Chuanbun	Bhumjaithai	

==== Central ====
Bhumjaithai (40) Pheu Thai (8) Kla Tham (6) People's (1)

District	Elected MP	Party	Notes
Ang Thong 1	Paradorn Prissananantakul	Bhumjaithai	
Ang Thong 2	Kornwee Prissananantakul	Bhumjaithai	
Chainat 1	Anucha Nakasai	Pheu Thai	
Chainat 2	Montian Songpracha	Bhumjaithai	
Kamphaeng Phet 1	Pai Leeke	Kla Tham	
Kamphaeng Phet 2	Petchpoom Aponrat	Kla Tham	
Kamphaeng Phet 3	Nopphol Ponumnuay	Pheu Thai	
Kamphaeng Phet 4	Surasit Wongwittayanant	Pheu Thai	
Lopburi 1	Narin Klangpha	Bhumjaithai	
Lopburi 2	Malika Jirapunvanit	Bhumjaithai	
Lopburi 3	Kanjanaporn Jirapunvanit	Bhumjaithai	
Lopburi 4	Worawong Worappanya	Pheu Thai	
Nakhon Nayok 1	Piyawat Kittitanesuan	Kla Tham	
Nakhon Nayok 2	Kriangkrai Kittithanesuan	Bhumjaithai	
Nakhon Sawan 1	Pattarawadee Niroj	Bhumjaithai	
Nakhon Sawan 2	Chanon Thaiseth	Bhumjaithai	
Nakhon Sawan 3	Sanya Ninsupan	Kla Tham	
Nakhon Sawan 4	Marup Sriphueng	Bhumjaithai	
Nakhon Sawan 5	Peeradej Sirivansan	Bhumjaithai	
Nakhon Sawan 6	Prasart Tanprasert	Bhumjaithai	
Phetchabun 1	Pimporn Pornputhipant	Bhumjaithai	
Phetchabun 2	Napayat Buain	Bhumjaithai	
Phetchabun 3	Boonchai Kittitharasup	Bhumjaithai	
Phetchabun 4	Worachot Sukhonkajorn	Bhumjaithai	
Phetchabun 5	Wanpen Promphat	Bhumjaithai	
Phetchabun 6	Akara Tongjaisod	Bhumjaithai	
Phichit 1	Pattarapong Phataraprasit	Bhumjaithai	
Phichit 2	Winai Phataraprasit	Bhumjaithai	
Phichit 3	Siriwat Khajonprasart	Bhumjaithai	
Phitsanulok 1	Natchanon Chanaburanasak	People's	
Phitsanulok 2	Noppol Leuangthongnara	Pheu Thai	
Phitsanulok 3	Pongmanu Thongnak	Bhumjaithai	
Phitsanulok 4	Niyom Changpinit	Bhumjaithai	
Phitsanulok 5	Chuti Krairiksh	Bhumjaithai	
Phra Nakhon Si Ayutthaya 1	Thongpol Suksomboon	Bhumjaithai	
Phra Nakhon Si Ayutthaya 2	Nop Cheewanan	Bhumjaithai	
Phra Nakhon Si Ayutthaya 3	Pimprueda Tanjararak	Bhumjaithai	
Phra Nakhon Si Ayutthaya 4	Surasak Phancharoenworakul	Bhumjaithai	
Phra Nakhon Si Ayutthaya 5	Pradit Sangkhai	Bhumjaithai	
Saraburi 1	Khunthong Saenwiset	Bhumjaithai	
Saraburi 2	Atthaphon Wongprayoon	Bhumjaithai	
Saraburi 3	Watcharapong Kuwijitsuwan	Bhumjaithai	
Saraburi 4	Ongart Wongprayoon	Kla Tham	
Sing Buri 1	Chotiwut Thanakamanusorn	Bhumjaithai	
Sukhothai 1	Nakhanang Kullanartsiri	Pheu Thai	
Sukhothai 2	Choosak Keereemasthong	Pheu Thai	
Sukhothai 3	Prapaporn Thongpaknam	Pheu Thai	
Sukhothai 4	Somjate Limpabandhu	Bhumjaithai	
Suphan Buri 1	Sorachud Suchitta	Bhumjaithai	
Suphan Buri 2	Nuttavood Prasertsuvan	Bhumjaithai	
Suphan Buri 3	Nattachat Wongprasert	Kla Tham	
Suphan Buri 4	Samerkun Thiengtham	Bhumjaithai	
Suphan Buri 5	Prapat Pothasuthon	Bhumjaithai	
Uthai Thani 1	Jeset Thaised	Bhumjaithai	
Uthai Thani 2	Chada Thaised	Bhumjaithai	

==== Eastern ====
Bhumjaithai (13) People's (8) Kla Tham (4) Palang Pracharath (2) Democrat (1) Pheu Thai (1)

District	Elected MP	Party	Notes
Chachoengsao 1	Thitima Chaisaeng	Pheu Thai	
Chachoengsao 2	Atthakorn Sirilattyakorn	Kla Tham	
Chachoengsao 3	Chaiwat Paopeamthapi	Kla Tham	
Chachoengsao 4	Yodsingha Liamloet	Kla Tham	
Chanthaburi 1	Suraphol Wiratyosinthin	Bhumjaithai	
Chanthaburi 2	Khampir Chunban	Bhumjaithai	
Chanthaburi 3	Charat Neranchar	Bhumjaithai	
Chonburi 1	Suchart Chomklin	Bhumjaithai	
Chonburi 2	Wannida Nophasit	People's	
Chonburi 3	Sitthipat Phausut	Bhumjaithai	
Chonburi 4	Jirawut Singtothong	Bhumjaithai	
Chonburi 5	Anan Pridasutthichit	Bhumjaithai	
Chonburi 6	Naruemat Piambandit	People's	
Chonburi 7	Sahatsawat Koomkong	People's	
Chonburi 8	Chaowalit Saeng-Uthai	Bhumjaithai	
Chonburi 9	Yodchai Puengporn	People's	
Chonburi 10	Thanathan Pramunphong	People's	
Prachinburi 1	Amnat Vilawan	Bhumjaithai	
Prachinburi 2	Chayut Phummakanchana	Bhumjaithai	
Prachinburi 3	Salit Butnain	Bhumjaithai	
Rayong 1	Kamonthat Kitti Sunthornsakul	People's	
Rayong 2	Krit Silpachai	People's	
Rayong 3	Phasin Pitutecha	Democrat	
Rayong 4	Chatchai Pitutecha	Bhumjaithai	
Rayong 5	Watcharaphong Sirirak	People's	
Sa Kaeo 1	Bodi Thienthong	Palang Pracharath	
Sa Kaeo 2	Trinuch Thienthong	Palang Pracharath	
Sa Kaeo 3	Incumbent	The last candidate suddenly died and is re-electing	
Trat 1	Pannaset Numnu	People's	

==== Northeastern ====
Bhumjaithai (60) Pheu Thai (44) Kla Tham (14) People's (8) Thai Ruam Palang (4) Palang Pracharath (2) Thai Sang Thai (1)

District	Elected MP	Party	Notes
Amnat Charoen 1	Suksomruay Wantaneekul	Bhumjaithai	
Amnat Charoen 2	Yaneenat Khemnak	Bhumjaithai	
Bueng Kan 1	Siam Penthong	Bhumjaithai	
Bueng Kan 2	Suriya Paensukha	Kla Tham	
Bueng Kan 3	Viroj Saerawong	Bhumjaithai	
Buriram 1	Sanong Thep-aksornnarong	Bhumjaithai	
Buriram 2	Natthuda Lekkudakorn	Bhumjaithai	
Buriram 3	Adipong Thitipitaya	Bhumjaithai	
Buriram 4	Chonnakant Timataruka	Bhumjaithai	
Buriram 5	Sophon Zaram	Bhumjaithai	
Buriram 6	Sak Zaram	Bhumjaithai	
Buriram 7	Pornchai Srisuriyayothin	Bhumjaithai	
Buriram 8	Trithep Ngamgamol	Bhumjaithai	
Buriram 9	Rungrot Thongsri	Bhumjaithai	
Buriram 10	Jakkrid Thongsri	Bhumjaithai	
Chaiyaphum 1	Ochit Kiatkongchuchai	Pheu Thai	
Chaiyaphum 2	Cherngchai Chaleerin	Pheu Thai	
Chaiyaphum 3	Samrit Thaensap	Bhumjaithai	
Chaiyaphum 4	Suchada Thaensap	Bhumjaithai	
Chaiyaphum 5	Siva Pongteeradul	Pheu Thai	
Chaiyaphum 6	Chawengsak Rengpaiboonwong	Bhumjaithai	
Chaiyaphum 7	Akarasankiri Lohweera	Kla Tham	
Kalasin 1	Wirat Pimpanit	Pheu Thai	
Kalasin 2	Palakorn Pimpanit	Pheu Thai	
Kalasin 3	Chamlong Poonwanata	Kla Tham	
Kalasin 4	Natwatchai Pimpanit	Pheu Thai	
Kalasin 5	Boonyapa Punanittha	Bhumjaithai	
Kalasin 6	Channawut Uttho	Pheu Thai	
Khon Kaen 1	Weeranan Huadsri	People's	
Khon Kaen 2	Itthiphol Chontarasiri	People's	
Khon Kaen 3	Ekkachai Subsarakham	Kla Tham	
Khon Kaen 4	Ekkarat Changlao	Kla Tham	
Khon Kaen 5	Prachya Ngokchai	Kla Tham	
Khon Kaen 6	Wisrut Puapeng	Bhumjaithai	
Khon Kaen 7	Surapot Taochareonsuk	Pheu Thai	
Khon Kaen 8	Thanik Masipitak	Pheu Thai	
Khon Kaen 9	Nattaphol Klumriangthong	Pheu Thai	
Khon Kaen 10	Potkorn Ananopkorn	Bhumjaithai	
Khon Kaen 11	Ongart Chatchaipolrat	Bhumjaithai	
Loei 1	Lertsak Pattanachaikul	Pheu Thai	
Loei 2	Saran Timsuwan	Pheu Thai	
Loei 3	Thanayose Thimsuwan	Bhumjaithai	
Loei 4	Somjate Sangcharoenrat	Pheu Thai	
Maha Sarakham 1	Rittirong Phumisawan	Bhumjaithai	
Maha Sarakham 2	Prawatt Thongsomboon	Pheu Thai	
Maha Sarakham 3	Latthachai Chokchaiwatakorn	Bhumjaithai	
Maha Sarakham 4	Wichian Chongchuwanich	Bhumjaithai	
Maha Sarakham 5	Jirawat Siripanich	Pheu Thai	
Maha Sarakham 6	Komkai Udompim	Bhumjaithai	
Mukdahan 1	Wiriya Thongpha	Bhumjaithai	
Mukdahan 2	Lekhadam Trisaranakom Nongruang	Kla Tham	
Nakhon Phanom 1	Supaphani Phosu	Bhumjaithai	
Nakhon Phanom 2	Manaporn Chareonsri	Pheu Thai	
Nakhon Phanom 3	Alongkot Maneekart	Bhumjaithai	
Nakhon Phanom 4	Chanchai Khamjampa	Pheu Thai	
Nakhon Ratchasima 1	Chat Suphatvanich	People's	
Nakhon Ratchasima 2	Wacharapon Tomornsak	People's	
Nakhon Ratchasima 3	Suttasit Potthasak	People's	
Nakhon Ratchasima 4	Natjira Immwiset	Pheu Thai	
Nakhon Ratchasima 5	Somkiat Tandiloktrakul	Pheu Thai	
Nakhon Ratchasima 6	Patcharawan Phinyo	Pheu Thai	
Nakhon Ratchasima 7	Piyanuch Yindeesuk	Pheu Thai	
Nakhon Ratchasima 8	Nikorn Somklang	Pheu Thai	
Nakhon Ratchasima 9	Polpee Suwanchawee	Bhumjaithai	
Nakhon Ratchasima 10	Boonjong Wongtaitrat	Bhumjaithai	
Nakhon Ratchasima 11	Arthit Wangsuphakitkosol	Pheu Thai	
Nakhon Ratchasima 12	Noraset Sirirojanaku	Pheu Thai	
Nakhon Ratchasima 13	Patchara Chanruangthong	Pheu Thai	
Nakhon Ratchasima 14	Nueng Khatiyanont	People's	
Nakhon Ratchasima 15	Rachata Dankul	Pheu Thai	
Nakhon Ratchasima 16	Tatirat Rattanaset	Bhumjaithai	
Nong Bua Lamphu 1	Chayanun Keletmek	Kla Tham	
Nong Bua Lamphu 2	Rungphet Srikanchana	Pheu Thai	
Nong Bua Lamphu 3	Pornnarong Nilnamah	Kla Tham	
Nong Khai 1	Kraa Trakulpornpong	Palang Pracharath	
Nong Khai 2	Yutthana Sitabut	Palang Pracharath	
Nong Khai 3	Sakda Chantharasuwan	Bhumjaithai	
Roi Et 1	Anurak Chureemas	Bhumjaithai	
Roi Et 2	Ekrat Phonsue	Kla Tham	
Roi Et 3	Ratchanee Phonsue	Kla Tham	
Roi Et 4	Supphasit Kocharoenyot	Pheu Thai	
Roi Et 5	Jiraporn Sindhuprai	Pheu Thai	
Roi Et 6	Thongli Mihinkong	Pheu Thai	
Roi Et 7	Chatchawan Phatayathai	Thai Sang Thai	
Roi Et 8	Chayapa Sinthuprai	Pheu Thai	
Sisaket 1	Siripong Angkasakunkiat	Bhumjaithai	
Sisaket 2	Supphakit Sihaphak	Bhumjaithai	
Sisaket 3	Thana Kitpaiboonchai	Bhumjaithai	
Sisaket 4	Chitphon Traisonnakun	Bhumjaithai	
Sisaket 5	Jintawan Trisaranakul	Bhumjaithai	
Sisaket 6	Werapon Jitsumrit	Pheu Thai	
Sisaket 7	Wilda Inchat	Pheu Thai	
Sisaket 8	Arsphol Suntraiphop	Bhumjaithai	
Sisaket 9	Withawat Traisonnakun	Bhumjaithai	
Sakon Nakhon 1	Sirapop Somphol	Kla Tham	
Sakon Nakhon 2	Chatri Laprom	Kla Tham	
Sakon Nakhon 3	Jiratchaya Supso	Pheu Thai	
Sakon Nakhon 4	Pattana Sapso	Pheu Thai	
Sakon Nakhon 5	Wongakul Boonsom	Kla Tham	
Sakon Nakhon 6	Borom Engchuan	Bhumjaithai	
Sakon Nakhon 7	Isarapong Upara	Pheu Thai	
Surin 1	Benya Mungcharoenporn	Bhumjaithai	
Surin 2	Natthaphon Charadrapheephong	Bhumjaithai	
Surin 3	Pakamas Charoenphan	Bhumjaithai	
Surin 4	Suri Thammat	Bhumjaithai	
Surin 5	Kroomanit Sangpoom	Pheu Thai	
Surin 6	Lumpert Puapattanachote	Bhumjaithai	
Surin 7	Rueangwit Koonwatanapong	Bhumjaithai	
Surin 8	Patida Tantiratnanon	Bhumjaithai	
Ubon Ratchathani 1	Worasit Kantinan	Pheu Thai	
Ubon Ratchathani 2	Narongchai Veerakul	Thai Ruam Palang	
Ubon Ratchathani 3	Pimpakarn Polsamak	Thai Ruam Palang	
Ubon Ratchathani 4	Kittunya Wajadee	Pheu Thai	
Ubon Ratchathani 5	Suthichai Charoonnet	Bhumjaithai	
Ubon Ratchathani 6	Thantharee Suntaphan	Pheu Thai	
Ubon Ratchathani 7	Sudarat Phitakpornphanlop	Bhumjaithai	
Ubon Ratchathani 8	Boonthida Somchai	Bhumjaithai	
Ubon Ratchathani 9	Jitrawan Wangsuphakitkosol	Thai Ruam Palang	
Ubon Ratchathani 10	Somsak Boonprachom	Thai Ruam Palang	
Ubon Ratchathani 11	Tuangthip Jintawet	Bhumjaithai	
Udon Thani 1	Anan Amarin	People's	
Udon Thani 2	Hathairat Petchpanomporn	Pheu Thai	
Udon Thani 3	Atikan Kaewsiri	Bhumjaithai	
Udon Thani 4	Traipop Kamphet	Pheu Thai	
Udon Thani 5	Buangern Rodkanmuang	Bhumjaithai	
Udon Thani 6	Adisak Kaewmungkunsub	Bhumjaithai	
Udon Thani 7	Suriya Wong-Ari	People's	
Udon Thani 8	Suphiraphant Phumiphak	Bhumjaithai	
Udon Thani 9	Watcharaphon Khaokham	Pheu Thai	
Udon Thani 10	Thiapjutha Khaokham	Pheu Thai	
Yasothon 1	Supaporn Slabsri	Bhumjaithai	
Yasothon 2	Warayut Jongaksorn	Bhumjaithai	
Yasothon 3	Thanaphat Srichana	Bhumjaithai	

==== Northern ====
Kla Tham (15) People's (12) Bhumjaithai (4) Pheu Thai (3) New Opportunity (1)

District	Elected MP	Party	Notes
Chiang Mai 1	Phetcharat Maichompoo	People's	
Chiang Mai 2	Karnik Chantada	People's	
Chiang Mai 3	Nattapon Towichakchaikul	People's	
Chiang Mai 4	Putita Chaianan	People's	
Chiang Mai 5	Somchit Kantaya	People's	
Chiang Mai 6	Supanun Panyatip	Kla Tham	
Chiang Mai 7	Karun Koocharoenchaiyakul	Kla Tham	
Chiang Mai 8	Pattarapong Leelaphat	People's	
Chiang Mai 9	Nares Thamrongthiphayakhun	Kla Tham	
Chiang Mai 10	Norapol Tantimontri	Kla Tham	
Chiang Rai 1	Thanarath Chongsuthanamanee	Pheu Thai	
Chiang Rai 2	Piyarat Tiyapairat	Pheu Thai	
Chiang Rai 3	Phitak Saengkham	Kla Tham	
Chiang Rai 4	Surasit Jiamwijak	Kla Tham	
Chiang Rai 5	Rangsan Wanchaithanawong	Bhumjaithai	
Chiang Rai 6	Molticha Chaiyabal	Kla Tham	
Chiang Rai 7	Sutthipong Wanchaythanawong	Kla Tham	
Lampang 1	Tipa Paweenasathien	People's	
Lampang 2	Dachai Ekpathapi	Kla Tham	
Lampang 3	Chonthanee Chueanoi	People's	
Lampang 4	Penpak Rattanakhamfu	Kla Tham	
Lamphun 1	Wittawisit Punsuanpluk	People's	
Lamphun 2	Chatchapee Wannapirach	People's	
Mae Hong Son 1	Pakorn Chinakham	Kla Tham	
Mae Hong Son 2	Sombat Yasin	Bhumjaithai	
Nan 1	Chaowit Innoi	People's	
Nan 2	Prasit Nontha	Kla Tham	
Nan 3	Charoen Apipathorakosol	People's	
Phayao 1	Anurat Prompow	Kla Tham	
Phayao 2	Anurat Tanbanjong	Kla Tham	
Phayao 3	Jeeradech Srivirach	Kla Tham	
Phare 1	Chanokanan Suphasiri	Bhumjaithai	
Phrae 2	Chanathip Supasiri	Bhumjaithai	
Phrae 3	Laksanaree Duangtadam	People's	
Uttaradit 1	Pichayut Pojit	Bhumjaithai	
Uttaradit 2	Rosarin Saranket	New Opportunity	
Uttaradit 3	Rawee Lek-uthai	Pheu Thai	

==== Southern ====
Bhumjaithai (31) Kla Tham (12) Democrat (9) Prachachat (4) People's (2)

District	Elected MP	Party	Notes
Chumphon 1	Wichai Sudsawat	Bhumjaithai	
Chumphon 2	Kittisak Phromrat	Bhumjaithai	
Chumphon 3	Supol Jullasai	Bhumjaithai	
Krabi 1	Kitti Kittithornkul	Bhumjaithai	
Krabi 2	Thiradet Tangmankorkit	Bhumjaithai	
Krabi 3	Kittichai Engchuan	Bhumjaithai	
Nakhon Si Thammarat 1	Songsak Musikong	Democrat	
Nakhon Si Thammarat 2	Nantawan Wichian	Bhumjaithai	
Nakhon Si Thammarat 3	Pitakdej Dejdecho	Democrat	
Nakhon Si Thammarat 4	Kanokporn Dejdecho	Democrat	
Nakhon Si Thammarat 5	Somsak Saeng-Arayakun	Kla Tham	
Nakhon Si Thammarat 6	Chomkrai Sawadiwong	Democrat	
Nakhon Si Thammarat 7	Aphinan Samosorn	Bhumjaithai	
Nakhon Si Thammarat 8	Aoypornsri Chaowalit	Bhumjaithai	
Nakhon Si Thammarat 9	Pimpatra Wichaikul	Bhumjaithai	
Narathiwat 1	Lutfi Haji Etae	Kla Tham	
Narathiwat 2	Amin Mayusoh	Kla Tham	
Narathiwat 3	Samphan Mayusoh	Kla Tham	
Narathiwat 4	Zakariya Sa-i	Bhumjaithai	
Narathiwat 5	Kamonsak Leewamoh	Prachachat	
Pattani 1	Baharuddin Yuso	Bhumjaithai	
Pattani 2	Kosey Mamu	Bhumjaithai	
Pattani 3	Burhan Samo	Bhumjaithai	
Pattani 4	Yunaidee Waba	Kla Tham	
Pattani 5	Sahe Muhammad Al-Idrus	Bhumjaithai	
Phang Nga 1	Atthaphon Trisri	Bhumjaithai	
Phang Nga 2	Chakaj Pattanakitwibul	Bhumjaithai	
Phatthalung 1	Athikun Kongmee	Bhumjaithai	
Phatthalung 2	Warot Therdveerapong	Bhumjaithai	
Phatthalung 3	Charan Chankaew	Kla Tham	
Phuket 1	Somchat Techathavorncharoen	People's	
Phuket 2	Chalermpong Saengdee	People's	
Phuket 3	Orathai Kerdsub	Kla Tham	
Ranong 1	Kongkrit Chatmaleerat	Bhumjaithai	
Satun 1	Pirapat Ratchakitpakarn	Bhumjaithai	
Satun 2	Worasit Liangprasit	Bhumjaithai	
Songkhla 1	Sanphet Bunyamanee	Bhumjaithai	
Songkhla 2	Juri Numkaew	Democrat	
Songkhla 3	Somyot Plaidung	Bhumjaithai	
Songkhla 4	Chanonphat Naksua	Kla Tham	
Songkhla 5	Wongwachara Khaothong	Kla Tham	
Songkhla 6	Anukul Phruksanusak	Bhumjaithai	
Songkhla 7	Natchanon Srikokuea	Bhumjaithai	
Songkhla 8	Surin Palarae	Kla Tham	
Songkhla 9	Saksit Khaothong	Democrat	
Surat Thani 1	Kansinee Opas Rangsan	Bhumjaithai	
Surat Thani 2	Pipit Rattanarak	Bhumjaithai	
Surat Thani 3	Wachiraporn Kanjana	Thai Ruam Palang	
Surat Thani 4	Somchart Pradidporn	Democrat	
Surat Thani 5	Paramet Jina	Kla Tham	
Surat Thani 6	Pichai Chompupon	Bhumjaithai	
Surat Thani 7	Phongsak Jaikaew	Kla Tham	
Trang 1	Ekaphon Na Phattalung	Bhumjaithai	
Trang 2	Thawee Suraban	Bhumjaithai	
Trang 3	Kritti Pak-Ichon	Democrat	
Trang 4	Karn Tangpong	Democrat	
Yala 1	Sulaiman Buenapenae	Prachachat	
Yala 2	Sugarno Matha	Prachachat	
Yala 3	Abdul-ayee Samang	Prachachat	

==== Western ====
Bhumjaithai (8) Kla Tham (6) Pheu Thai (3) People's (1)

District	Elected MP	Party	Notes
Kanchanaburi 1	Akaranan Kankittinan	Pheu Thai	
Kanchanaburi 2	Chukiat Jinapak	Bhumjaithai	
Kanchanaburi 3	Yossawat Mapaisansin	Bhumjaithai	
Kanchanaburi 4	Wisuda Wichiansilp	Pheu Thai	
Kanchanaburi 5	Phanom Phokaew	Pheu Thai	
Phetchaburi 1	Thiwanrat Angkinan	Bhumjaithai	
Phetchaburi 2	Rerk Udee	Bhumjaithai	
Phetchaburi 3	Apichat Kaewkosol	Bhumjaithai	
Prachuap Khiri Khan 1	Sangkhom Daengchot	Bhumjaithai	
Prachuap Khiri Khan 2	Chakkapan Piyapornpaiboon	Kla Tham	
Prachuap Khiri Khan 3	Pramual Pongthavaradet	Kla Tham	
Ratchaburi 1	Kulvaree Nopamornbodee	Bhumjaithai	
Ratchaburi 2	Boonying Nitikanchana	Kla Tham	
Ratchaburi 3	Jatuporn Kamonphanthip	Kla Tham	
Ratchaburi 4	Akaradej Wongpitakroj	Bhumjaithai	
Ratchaburi 5	Boonlue Prasertsopar	Bhumjaithai	
Samut Songkhram 1	Arnupap Likitamnuaychai	People's	
Tak 1	Thanat Thawikuekulkit	Bhumjaithai	
Tak 2	Chingchai Korprabhakit	Kla Tham	
Tak 3	Pakpoom Boonpramuk	Kla Tham	

=== Party-list proportional representation ===
==== Bhumjaithai ====
Rank	Elected MP	Party	Notes
1	Anutin Charnvirakul	Bhumjaithai	• 32nd Prime Minister of Thailand • Minister of Interior • Leader of the Bhumjaithai Party
2	Chaichanok Chidchob	Bhumjaithai	• Minister of Digital Economy and Society • Secretary-General of the Bhumjaithai Party
3	Varawut Silpa-archa	Bhumjaithai	• Minister of Industry
4	Santi Promphat	Bhumjaithai	
5	Sabida Thaiseth	Bhumjaithai	
6	Chalat Ratchakitprakarn	Bhumjaithai	
7	Ekanat Promphan	Bhumjaithai	
8	Suphamas Isaraprakdee	Bhumjaithai	
9	Pitcharat Laohaphongchana	Bhumjaithai	
10	Traisuli Traisaranakul	Bhumjaithai	
11	Nandana Songpracha	Bhumjaithai	
12	Rhomtham Khamnurat	Bhumjaithai	
13	Kritsada Leenawarat	Bhumjaithai	
14	Sasithorn Kittithornkul	Bhumjaithai	
15	Supachai Jaisamut	Bhumjaithai	
16	Padimchai Sasomsap	Bhumjaithai	
17	Kriengyot Sudlapa	Bhumjaithai	
18	Thanakorn Wangboonkhongchana	Bhumjaithai	
19	Rinlita Adisa	Bhumjaithai	

==== People's ====
Rank	Elected MP	Party	Notes
1	Natthaphong Ruengpanyawut	People's	• Leader of the Opposition • Leader of the People's Party
2	Sirikanya Tansakun	People's	
3	Veerayuth Kanchuchat	People's	
4	Sia Champatong	People's	
5	Itsariya Pairiphairit	People's	
6	Nattaya Boonphakdee	People's	
7	Pawut Pongwitthayaphanu	People's	
8	Rangsiman Rome	People's	
9	Parit Watcharasin	People's	
10	Surachet Pravinvongvuth	People's	
11	Sittipon Wibultanakun	People's	
12	Teera Sutheewarangkoon	People's	
13	Pakornwut Udompipatkul	People's	
14	Natthawut Buaprathum	People's	
15	Kittipong Piyawanno	People's	
16	Wayo Assawarungruang	People's	
17	Wisut Tantinan	People's	
18	Chaiwat Sathavorawijit	People's	
19	Poonsak Chanchampa	People's	
20	Natcha Boonchaiinsawas	People's	
21	Supachot Chaiyasat	People's	
22	Pramual Suthecharuwat	People's	
23	Laofang Banthitterdsakun	People's	
24	Kittichai Techakulwanich	People's	
25	Phakamon Nunanan	People's	
26	Sorasak Samonkraisorakit	People's	
27	Piyarat Chongthep	People's	
28	Rukchanok Srinork	People's	
29	Romadon Panjor	People's	
30	Ekkapop Sittiwanthana	People's	
31	Theerasak Chiratrachoo	People's	
32	Thanaporn Wijan	People's	

==== Pheu Thai ====
Rank	Elected MP	Party	Notes
1	Yodchanan Wongsawat	Pheu Thai	• Deputy Prime Minister of Thailand • Minister of Higher Education, Science, Research and Innovation
2	Chulaphan Amornvivat	Pheu Thai	• Minister of Labor
3	Suriya Juangroongruangkit	Pheu Thai	• Minister of Agriculture and Cooperatives
4	Pairoj Lohsoontorn	Pheu Thai	
5	Prasert Jantararuangtong	Pheu Thai	• Minister of Education
6	Chaturon Chaisang	Pheu Thai	
7	Chusak Sirinin	Pheu Thai	
8	Sutin Khungsang	Pheu Thai	
9	Visuth Chainaroon	Pheu Thai	
10	Suchart Thadathamarongvej	Pheu Thai	
11	Suchart Tonjaroen	Pheu Thai	
12	Sudawan Wangsuphakitkosol	Pheu Thai	
13	Thongtham Wechachai	Pheu Thai	
14	Natthida Thepsuthin	Pheu Thai	
15	Prayut Siripanich	Pheu Thai	
16	Adisorn Piangket	Pheu Thai	

==== Kla Tham ====
Rank	Elected MP	Party	Notes
1	Thamanat Prompow	Kla Tham	
2	Narumon Pinyosinwat	Kla Tham	

==== Democrat ====
Rank	Elected MP	Party	Notes
1	Abhisit Vejjajiva	Democrat	
2	Chuan Leekpai	Democrat	
3	Korn Chatikavanij	Democrat	
4	Kardee Leowpairoj	Democrat	
5	Chaiwut Bannawat	Democrat	
6	Amporn Pinasasa	Democrat	
7	Sathit Wongnongteuy	Democrat	
8	Chaichana Detdecho	Democrat	
9	Sakoltee Phatthiyakul	Democrat	
10	Ratklao Intawong Suwannakiri	Democrat	
11	Isra Sunthornwat	Democrat	
12	Songkran Jitsuthiphakorn	Democrat	

==== Smaller Parties ====
Overall Rank	Party Rank	Elected MP	Party	Notes
1		Wasawath Puangphonsri	Thai Ruam Palang	
2	1	Pakorn Thianchai	Palang Pracharath	
3	1	Tawee Sodsong	Prachachat	
4	1	Chris Potranandana	Economic	
5	2	Peerapol Kanokwalai	Economic	
6	3	Angsana Niamwanichkul	Economic	
7	1	Pirapan Salirathavibhaga	United Thai Nation	
8	2	Chatchawan Kongudom	United Thai Nation	
9	1	Udomdech Rattanathien	Thai Sang Thai	
10	1	Pongthawat Techadechruangkul	PCP	
11	2	Achinathirat Chatthaweeworachai	PCP	
12	1	Pornchai Woonyarong	Pakdee	
13	1	Surathin Phichan	New Democracy	
14	1	Rachen Trakulwiang	New Alternative Party	
15	1	Apiwit Thiparat	PPP	
16	1	Sereepisuth Temeeyaves	Thai Liberal	
17	1	Taweesap Tatsamai	Thai Sup Thawee Party	
18	1	Nawinda Sawaddetdee	New Party	
19	1	Boonrawee Yomchinda	RJT	
20	1	Preecha Khaikaew	New Dimension Party	
