= Chumphon Lakkham =

Thai politician (born 1983)

- ชุมพล หลักคำ

Member of the Thai House of Representatives
- Incumbent
- Assumed office 8 February 2026
- Preceded by: Theerarat Samrejvanich

Personal details
- Born: October 5, 1983 (age 43) Bangkok, Thailand
- Party: People's Party (2024–present)
- Other political affiliations: Move Forward Party (2023–2024)
- Education: Ratchathani University, UdonThani Campus
- Occupation: Politician

Chumphon Lakkham (Thai: ชุมพล หลักคำ), nicknamed Luek (Thai: ลึก) is a Thai politician who served as a Bangkok Member of the House of Representatives for the People's Party.

== Life and career ==
Chumphon Lakkham was born in 1983, in Bangkok, Thailand. He studied at Ratchathani University, UdonThani Campus and then graduated with a Bachelor of Laws (LL.B.) degree. He entered a workforce in 2005.

Chumphon began his career in 2005 as an officer for Chase Asia Public Company Limited. In 2014, he left the company and joined Advance Property and Consultant Company Limited. During the COVID-19 pandemic, he served as the manager of the Sainam Foundation. Chumphon started his career when he ran for the 2023 Thai general election, but he was placed 2nd, defeated by Theerarat Samrejvanich. He then ran for the 2026 Thai general election, and won with 34,941 votes, outwinning the other 13 candidates.
