= Pimkarn Kiratiwirapakorn =

Thai politician (born 1990)

- พิมพ์กาญจน์ กีรติวิราปกรณ์

Member of the House of Representatives
- Incumbent
- Assumed office 14 May 2023
- Preceded by: Jirayu Huangsab

Personal details
- Born: 1990 (age 35–36) Min Buri district, Bangkok, Thailand
- Party: People's (2024–present)
- Other political affiliations: Move Forward Party (2023–2024)

Pimkarn Kiratiwirapakorn (Thai: พิมพ์กาญจน์ กีรติวิราปกรณ์), nicknamed Pim (Thai: พิม) is a Thai politician who served as a Bangkok Member of the House of Representatives for the People's Party.

== Life and career ==
Pimkarn Kiratiwirapakorn was born in 1990, in Min Buri district, Bangkok. She studied elementary at Thep Aksorn School. Then, she studied highschool at Triam Udom Suksa Pattanakarn Suwinthawong School, and Setthabut Bamphen School. She attended Ramkhamhaeng University, where she graduated with a Bachelor of Arts degree in English. She then worked in the private sector in business development and international trade.

Pimkarn started her business career as the co-founder of the Zendai Foundation, helping the locals in Khlong Sam Wa with medical coordination and bed placement during the COVID-19 pandemic. She then worked as a parliamentary assistant to Supisat Bhakdinarunart, a Move Forward Party MP and deputy party leader. In the 2023 Thai general election, she ran as the candidate for Bangkok's 16th constituency and was elected to the 2023 Thai House of Representatives. Following the dissolution of the party by the Constitutional Court in August 2024, she joined its successor, the People's Party, along with the other Bangkok candidates such as Suphanat Minchainant, Chayaphon Satondee, and Vittawat Tichawanich.

In the 2026 Thai general election, Pimkarn was elected with 46,021 votes, outwinning the other 14 candidates.

== Controversy ==
In 2026, during the campaign period for the 2026 Thai general election, a formal complaint was filed against Pimkarn with the Election Commission of Thailand by Attapol Sitthichaiarikit, a candidate from the United Thai Nation Party. The complaint alleged that on 18 January 2026, Pimkarn and her campaign staff violated Section 73 of the Organic Act on the Election of Members of the House of Representatives by distributing bicycles and other items of value to attendees at a Children's Day in Khlong Sam Wa District, while soliciting votes and displaying candidate hand gestures.
