= Nuttapong Premphunsawad =

Thai politician (born 1995)

- ณัฐพงศ์ เปรมพูลสวัสดิ์

Member of the Thai House of Representatives
- Incumbent
- Assumed office May 14, 2023

Personal details
- Born: December 19, 1994 (age 31) Bangkok, Thailand
- Party: People's Party (2024–present)
- Other political affiliations: Move Forward Party (2023–2024)
- Education: Thammasat University; Asian Institute of Technology

Nuttapong Premphunsawad (Thai: ณัฐพงศ์ เปรมพูลสวัสดิ์), nicknamed Kung (Thai: คุง) is a Thai politician who served as a Bangkok Member of the House of Representatives for the People's Party.

== Life and career ==
Nuttapong Premphunsawad was born on 19 December, 1994, in Bangkok. He studied at Thammasat University and graduated with a degree of Bachelor of Urban Planning. He received a scholarship from the Government of Thailand to study abroad at the Asian Institute of Technology. He then earned a Master of Science in Urban Environmental Management. He worked as an urban planner in transportation at the Thailand Development Research Institute.

Nuttapong started his career when he served as the assistant to Move Forward Party for Surachet Pravinvongvuth. In the 2023 Thai general election, he ran as the Move Forward Party candidate for Bangkok's 21 and was elected to the House of Representatives with 44,959 votes, beating the other 13 other candidates. In 2024, Move Forward Party got dissolved, so Nuttapong joined a new one called People's Party. In the 2026 Thai general election, he ran again for the same constituency and won with 45,951 votes, beating the other 14 candidates.
