= Napat Jittapinankanta =

Thai politician (born 1990)

- ณพัฎน์ จิตตภินันท์กัณตา

Member of the Thai House of Representatives
- Incumbent
- Assumed office 16 March 2026
- Preceded by: Taopiphop Limjittrakorn

Personal details
- Born: September 24, 1990 (age 36) Bangkok, Thailand
- Party: People's Party (2026–present)

Napat Jittapinankanta (Thai: ณพัฎน์ จิตตภินันท์กัณตา), nicknamed Nat (Thai: นัท) is a Thai politician who served as a Bangkok Member of the House of Representatives for the People's Party.

== Biography ==
Napat Jittapinankanta was born on September 24, 1990, in Bangkok. During his education, he was involved in the 2006 Thai coup d'état, which inspired him to be a politician in the future. He studied his university studies in Bangkok University. He graduated with a degree on School of Communication Arts. Napat started his career as a writer. He then won the Matichon Award for short fiction.

Napat started his political career when he ran for the Bangkok 24 for the 2026 Thai House of Representatives. He won with 46,415 votes, outwinning the other 12 candidates and succeeding the previous candidate Taopiphop Limjittrakorn.
