= Weerawut Rukthieng =

Thai politician (born 1990)

- วีรวุธ รักเที่ยง

Member of the House of Representatives
- Incumbent
- Assumed office 14 May 2023
- Preceded by: Siripong Rasmi

Personal details
- Born: October 12, 1983 (age 43) Lat Krabang district, Bangkok, Thailand
- Party: People's (2024–present)
- Other political affiliations: Move Forward Party (2023–2024)

Weerawut Rukthieng (Thai: วีรวุธ รักเที่ยง), nicknamed Max (Thai: แม็ก) is a Thai politician who served as a Bangkok Member of the House of Representatives for the People's Party.

== Life and career ==
Weerawut was born in 1983, in Lat Krabang district, Bangkok. He studied elementary at Wat Lat Krabang School before finishing his highschool at Debsirin Romklao School, for Class 17. He graduated and got a degree in Computing Business at Ekawit Business Administration Vocational College, and Marketing Business at Bangkok Suvarnabhumi University.

Weerawut started his political career when he joined the Move Forward Party to run in the 2023 Thai general election for the 17th Bangkok constituency. He won and was elected to the 2023 Thai House of Representatives, assuming his office in 14 May 2023. In 2024, his party got dissolute and was changed to People's. He ran for hte 2026 Thai House of Representatives, with 28,587 votes, outwinning the other 14 candidates.

== Controversy ==
In 10 September 2026, Weerawut was named as one of 25 victims in a complaint post at Bang Pho Police Station. The complaint alleged under Section 157 of the Criminal Code and violations surrounding the committee's decision to appoint Somchai Srisutthiyakorn, former politician.
