= Kanphong Prayoonsak =

Thai politician (born 1989)

- กันต์พงษ์ ประยูรศักดิ์

Member of the Thai House of Representatives
- Incumbent
- Assumed office 14 May 2023
- Preceded by: Chanvit Wipoosiri

Personal details
- Born: August 20, 1989 (age 37) Bangkok, Thailand
- Party: People's Party (2024–present)
- Other political affiliations: Move Forward Party (2023–2024)
- Education: Assumption University of Thailand
- Occupation: Politician

Kanphong Prayoonsak (Thai: กันต์พงษ์ ประยูรศักดิ์), nicknamed Ait (Thai: เอท) is a Thai politician who served as a Bangkok Member of the House of Representatives for the People's Party.

== Life and career ==
Kanphong Prayurasak was born in 1989, in Bangkok. He studied high school at Assumption College. He graduated with a degree on Bachelor of Engineering and Master of Engineering at Assumption University of Thailand.

== Career ==
Kanphong started his political career when he ran for 2023 Thai general election for Bangkok's 19 for the Move Forward Party. He won with 41,841 votes, outwinning the other 16 candidates. In 2024, his party got dissolute. So he joined the new one called People's Party.

In the 2026 Thai general election, he got re-elected with 42,820 votes, outwinning the other 13 candidates.

== Personal life ==
Before entering the political career, Kanphong worked as a full-time professor at Assumption University.

== Controversy ==
In 2026, Kanphong had a controversy surrounding a Department of Special Investigation for the Forex financial fraud network involving politicians. He defended his party on social media. Responding to political attacks and leaks aimed at the party, he published a Facebook post hashtag "#ลูกเทพ อะไรของมึง !!!", which criticize the other political opponents.
