= Suthee Meanchainun =

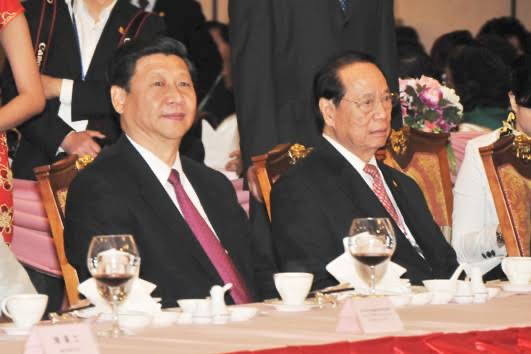
- Xi Jinping and Suthee Meanchainun
- Born: 1930
- Died: January 24, 2026 (aged 95–96)
- Occupation: Civil Engineering/Landowner
- Children: 4

Suthee Meanchainun (Minchaiynunt) (Thai: สุธี มีนชัยนันท์) is a Thai billionaire businessman, landowner, and philanthropist. He is an honourable lifetime President of Thai-Chinese Chamber of Commerce. Suthee is a major contributor between China–Thailand relations. He is of an aristocratic family of formerly Min Buri province- currently part of Bangkok.

== Early life and family ==
Suthee was born of Chinese ancestry in Min Buri. The Minchaiynunt family is widely known for rice mills and civil construction business since the early 1900s. They later became influential in the Eastern part of Bangkok due to their involvement in local and national politics.

Suthee's nephew Vicharn Minchainant was a former Deputy Minister of Public Health and a 4 time member of parliament (MP) serving Min Buri. Wirat Minchainant was a three time member of the Bangkok Metropolitan council serving Min Buri is also one of Suthee’s nephews. Suthee's great nephew, Suphanat Minchainant is twice elected as a Member of Parliament for Bangkok in 2023 and 2026 which continues his family legacy as 'bloodline of influential politicians of Bangkok'.

== Career ==
Suthee started his career in rice milling industry later in real estate development and civil engineering. Suthee is a director of Chainunt Construction, Thailand top ranked civil engineering company.

Suthee was accused of benefitting from the new BTS pink line planned due to his numerous patches of land around Min Buri and eastern Bangkok in excess of 5,000 rais, or around 2,000 acres contributing his wealth.

== Royal decorations ==
- 2005 – Knight Grand Cross (First Class) of the Most Admirable Order of the Direkgunabhorn
