= Supakon Tangtiphaiboontana =

Thai politician (born 1993)

- สุภกร ตันติไพบูลย์ธนะ

Member of the Thai House of Representatives
- Incumbent
- Assumed office 14 May 2023
- Preceded by: Monthol Phokai

Personal details
- Born: 1993 (age 32–33) Bangkok, Thailand
- Party: People's Party (2024–present)
- Other political affiliations: Move Forward Party (2023–2024)

Supakon Tangtiphaiboontana (Thai: สุภกร ตันติไพบูลย์ธนะ), nicknamed Gift (Thai: กิ๊ฟ) is a Thai politician who served as a Bangkok Member of the House of Representatives for the People's Party.

== Biography ==
Supakon Tangtiphaiboontana was born in 1993, in Bangkok. He studied at Bangkok University and graduated with a degree on Bachelor of Communication Arts. He then finished an executive leadership program in politics and elections, which was organized by the Election Commission of Thailand.

In the 2023 Thai general election, Supakon ran as the Move Forward Party candidate for Bangkok's 22nd constituency. He was elected to the House of Representatives in 2023 with 43,083 votes, outwinnign the other 13 candidates. In 2024, the party he was on got dissolved, so he joined the new one called People's Party. In 2026 Thai general election, he ran for the same constituency and won with 42,264 votes, outwinning the other 13 candidates.
