= Teerajchai Phunthumas =

Thai politician (born 1964)

- Teerajchai in 2023

Member of the House of Representatives
- Incumbent
- Assumed office 14 May 2023

Personal details
- Born: Surachai Phunthumas; August 25, 1964 (age 62) Phra Nakhon Province, Thailand
- Party: Thai Rak Thai (2002–2006); Matchima Thipataya (2007–2008); Rakhang Santi (2011–2018); Future Forward (2018–2020); Move Forward (2020–2024); People's Party (2024–present)
- Spouse: Jitra Phunthumas (m. 1998)
- Relations: Daranee Sucharit (elder sister)
- Children: Paweennuch; Kittipitch
- Parents: Somchai Phunthumas (father); Saichol Phunthumas (mother)

Teerajchai Phunthumas (Thai: ธีรัจชัย พันธุมาศ; born 25 August 1964) is a Thai politician who served as a Member of the House of Representatives for Bangkok 18th constituency, representing the People's Party. He is a former party-list Member of the House of Representatives under the Move Forward Party and a former advisor to ministers.

== Early life ==
Teerajchai Phunthumas was born on 25 August 1964 in Phra Nakhon Province. He graduated with a Bachelor of Laws degree from the Ramkhamhaeng University and was qualified as a Thai Barrister-at-Law at the Institute of Legal Education of the Thai Bar Association. He later pursued further studies and earned two master's degrees: a Master of Laws in Public Law from Ramkhamhaeng University and a Master of Public and Private Management from the National Institute of Development Administration.

== Career ==
Teerajchai started his political career as an attorney in 1991 before entering politics by joining the Thai Rak Thai Party in 2002. In the 2007 Thai general election, he ran for parliament as a proportional representation candidate for Group 6. He ranked fourth for the Matchima Thipataya Party list, but was not elected. In the 2011 Thai general election, he contested Bangkok's 15th constituency under the Rakhang Santi Party, but was again not elected.

In 2018, Teerajchai joined the Future Forward Party and ran for election as a party-list candidate and was ranked 47th. He was successfully elected to his first term as a member in 2019 Thai House of Representatives. He gained national prominence for his debation the qualifications of Captain Thamanat Prompow, Deputy Minister of Agriculture and Cooperatives In 2020. In the same year, the party he was in got dissolute, so he moved to the Move Forward Party.

In the 2023 Thai general election, he ran as a candidate for Bangkok 18 constituency and was elected. Following another dissolution of the Move Forward Party, Teerajchai moved to the People's Party. In the 2026 Thai general election, he ran for re-election in the same constituency as a candidate for the People's Party and was successfully elected to his third term as a member of 2026 Thai House of Representatives.

== Royal decorations ==
- 2005 – Member of the 5th class of Most Noble Order of the Crown of Thailand
