= Piyarat Chongthep =

Thai activist and politician

- ปิยรัฐ จงเทพ
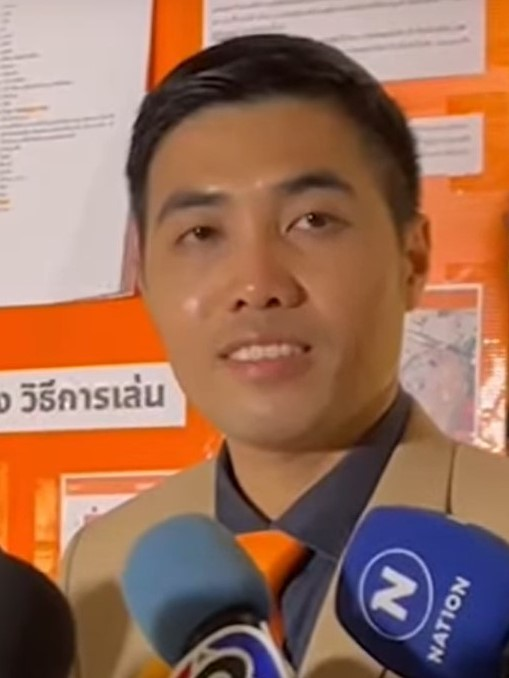

Member of the House of Representatives
- In office 14 May 2023 – 8 February 2026
- Preceded by: Somkiat Thanomsin
- Succeeded by: Chonlathan Supphaiboonlerd

Personal details
- Born: October 23, 1990 (age 35)
- Party: People's

Piyarat Chongthep (Thai: ปิยรัฐ จงเทพ) is a Thai activist and politician, serving as a Member of Parliament for the People's Party.

== Career ==
=== Royal defamation charges ===
Piyarat has been charged with royal defamation (Article 112 of the Criminal Code) under Thailand's lese-majeste laws three times.

The first instance, Piyarat faced accusations of criticizing the Thai government's COVID-19 vaccine procurement, and was later acquitted. A second case is ongoing, regarding a speech given at a 22 August 2020 protest in Ubon Ratchathani province.

In a 31 December 2020 Facebook post, Piyarat allegedly referred to the Thai monarchy's use of taxpayer money when criticizing a police crackdown during the COVID-19 pandemic. He was also charged under Article 14 of the Computer Crime Act. On 26 August 2025, Piyarat was acquitted of the charges.
