= Chonlathan Supphaiboonlerd =

Thai politician (born 1990)

- ชลธาร ทรัพย์ไพบูลย์เลิศ
- Chonlathan in 2026

Member of the Thai House of Representatives
- Incumbent
- Assumed office 8 February 2026
- Preceded by: Piyarat Chongthep

Personal details
- Born: 1990 (age 35–36) Phra Khanong Nuea, Bangkok, Thailand
- Party: People's Party (2024–present)
- Education: Thammasat University; Leiden University
- Occupation: Politician
- Profession: laywer

Chonlathan Supphaiboonlerd (Thai: ชลธาร ทรัพย์ไพบูลย์เลิศ), nicknamed Ice (Thai: ไอซ์) is a Thai politician who served as a Bangkok Member of the House of Representatives for the People's Party.

== Biography ==
Chonlathan Supphaiboonlerd was born in 1990, in Phra Khanong Nuea, Bangkok. He studied his university education at Thammasat University and graduated with a degree in Bachelor of Laws. He later moved to the Netherlands to continue his education at Leiden University and then graduated with a Master of Laws in Public International Law.

Chonlathan started his career as a lawyer. He worked as an advisor for the International Commission of Jurists and served as a Manager for the office of the Hanns Seidel Foundation. He then started his political career when he ran for the 2026 Thai general election for the Bangkok 23 constituency. He won with 46,872 votes, outwinning the other 12 candidates.

== Personal life ==
On 19 April 2026, during the 152nd Inter-Parliamentary Union in Istanbul, Chonlathan was elected to the committee on the Human Rights as a representative for the Asia-Pacific seat.
