= Pitikorn Bunpaesat =

Thai politician (born 1987)

- ปิติกรณ์ บรรณเภสัช

Member of the House of Representatives
- Incumbent
- Assumed office March 15, 2026

Personal details
- Born: July 23, 1987 (age 39) Thailand
- Party: People's (2024–present)
- Other political affiliations: Move Forward Party (2023–2024)

Pitikorn Bunpaesat (Thai: ปิติกรณ์ บรรณเภสัช), nicknamed Fiat (Thai: เฟี๊ยด) is a Thai politician and represents as a member of the House of Representatives for the People's Party.

== Life and career ==
Pitikorn Bunpaesat was born in 1987 in Thailand. He studied middle school at Suankularb Wittayalai School. He earned a bachelor's degree in accounting from Kasetsart University and a Master of Science degree in Investment from Aston University in Birmingham.

Following the dissolution of the Party in 2024, he joined the People's Party. In the 2026 Thai general election, he was re-elected as Member of the House of Representatives for Bangkok Constituency 5 under the People's Party out of 13 candidates.

== Personal life ==
Before joining the political career, Pitikorn worked as an aide to First Deputy Speaker of the House for Padipat Suntiphada. He also served on the team that analyzed the budget of the Ministry of Defence for Member of Parliament for Chayaphon Satondee.

== Controversy ==
In 2026, Pitikorn raised concerns during an accusation regarding what he accused as "zero-dollar durian" businesses in Huai Khwang district. He alleged that some durian sellers were linked to Chinese business networks and that economic benefits were not entering the Thai economy. Following the accusation, the owner of a durian shop referenced during the discussion disputed the allegations. Pitikorn later stated that there had been a misunderstanding regarding the information presented.
