= Seksit Yaemsanguansak =

Thai politician (born 1998)

- เสกสิทธิ์ แย้มสงวนศักดิ์

Member of the House of Representatives
- Incumbent
- Assumed office March 15, 2026

Personal details
- Born: 1998 (age 27–28)
- Party: People's (2024–present)

Seksit Yaemsanguansak (Thai: เสกสิทธิ์ แย้มสงวนศักดิ์), nicknamed Sek (Thai: เสก) is a Thai politician and represents as a member of the House of Representatives for the People's Party.

== Life and career ==
Seksit graduated from Suankularb Wittayalai School. He later earned a Bachelor of Political Science in Politics and Governance with first-class honors from Thammasat University, where he also completed a minor in sociology and anthropology.

Seksit started his political career and was involved in pro-democracy and academic work. He served as the head of the academic affairs division of the United Front of Thammasat and Demonstration, a student-led political movement active during the Thai pro-democracy protests. He worked as a research assistant on projects examining about political repression and nonviolent social movements. He also served on a subcommittee studying police reform under the House Committee on State Security. Seksit entered an election as a candidate of the People's Party in the 2026 Thai general election. He contested Bangkok's 2nd constituency and received 37,055 votes, winning the election.

== Personal life ==
Suksit worked as an independent writer and scholar. His articles have appeared in publications including The 101 World and Prachatai, where he has written on issues such as social violence, political conflict, and military coups. He was also a guest lecturer in political behavior at the Faculty of Social Sciences, Srinakharinwirot University.
