= Patsarin Ramwong =

Thai politician (born 1987)

- ภัสริน รามวงศ์

Member of the House of Representatives
- Incumbent
- Assumed office May 14, 2023

Personal details
- Born: 5 September 1984 (age 42) Thailand
- Party: People's (2024–present)
- Other political affiliations: Move Forward Party (2023–2024)

Patsarin Ramwong (Thai: ภัสริน รามวงศ์), nicknamed Kan (Thai: กานต์) is a Thai politician and represents as a member of the House of Representatives for the People's Party.

== Life and career ==
Patsarin Ramwong was born in 5 September 1984 in Thailand. She got three degrees. Master of Arts at Oregon State University, Socials at Chulalongkorn University, and Russian arts at Thammasat University.

Patsarin started her political career as a member of the Move Forward Party and was elected to the House of Representatives in the 2023 Thai general election, representing Bangkok 7. During her tenure, she has focused on women's rights, LGBTQIA+ rights and social equality issues.

In the 2026 Thai general election, she was re-elected for the Bangkok 4 constituency with 40,962 votes, outwinning the other 13 candidates.
