= Annsiri Walaikanok =

Thai politician (born 1981)

Annisiri Walaikanok
- แอนศิริ วลัยกนก

Member of the House of Representatives
- Incumbent
- Assumed office May 14, 2023
- Preceded by: Thodsaporn Thongsiri

Personal details
- Born: November 28, 1981 (age 44) Thung Khru District, Thailand
- Party: People's (2024–present)
- Other political affiliations: Move Forward Party (2023–2024)
- Parents: Pongsak Walaikanok (father); Onusa Ritsueb (mother)
- Education: Suan Dusit University

Annisiri Walaikanok (Thai: แอนศิริ วลัยกนก), nicknamed Ann (Thai: แอน) is a Thai politician and represents as a member of the House of Representatives for the People's Party.

== Biography ==
Annisiri Walaikanok was born on November 28, 1981, in Thung Khru District, Thailand. She completed her secondary school at Buranasuksa School. She then studied at Suan Dusit University and completed a Bachelor of Arts in Hotel and Tourism Management. She then later studied at Ramkhamhaeng University and got an MBA in marketing.

In 2022, Annsiri started her political career when she joined the Move Forward Party. She serves as an advisor to the party's development committee. In the 2023 Thai general election, she ran for the Bangkok 25 constituency. She won with 35,623 votes, outwinning the other fifteen candidates.

In 2024, the Move Forward Party was dissolved; she then joined its successor, the People's Party. Then, she ran for the same constituency in the 2026 Thai general election. She won with 37,035 votes, beating the other 13 candidates.

== Royal decorations ==
- 2025 – Knight Commander (Second Class) of the Most Exalted Order of the Crown of Thailand

== Personal life ==
Before entering politics, Annsiri worked in the banking sector for 17 years. She served as the manager at TMBThanachart Bank until 2022.
