= Kantapon Duangamporn =

Thai politician (born 1987)

- กัณตภณ ดวงอัมพร

Member of the House of Representatives
- Incumbent
- Assumed office June 19, 2023

Personal details
- Born: March 18, 1986 (age 40) Thailand
- Party: People's (2024–present)
- Other political affiliations: Move Forward Party (2023–2024)

Kantapon Duangamporn (Thai: กัณตภณ ดวงอัมพร), nicknamed Rambo (Thai: แรมโบ้) is a Thai politician and represents as a member of the House of Representatives for the People's Party.

== Life and career ==
Kantapon Duangamporn was born on March 18, 1986 in Thailand. He studied kindergarten at Anubanratsami Phayathai School and studied elementary at Saint John's International School. He studied secondary at Bodindecha School and got a degree on economics at Kasetsart University.

Kantapon started his political career as a candidate of the Move Forward Party in Bangkok's 6th constituency during the 2023 Thai general election. He won the election and represented Bangkok 6 in House of Representatives and assumed office as a member of the 26th House of Representatives in 2023. Following the dissolution of the Move Forward Party in 2024, he joined the People's. In the 2026 Thai general election, he won the election with 43,239 votes and run for the Bangkok 6.

Before being elected, he participated in political and community activities organized by the movement in Bangkok prior to contesting the 2023 Thai general election.
