= Bhuntin Noumjerm =

Thai politician (born 1979)

- ภัณฑิล น่วมเจิม

Member of the House of Representatives
- Incumbent
- Assumed office July 4, 2023

Personal details
- Born: 1979 (age 46–47) Bangkok, Thailand
- Party: People's (2024–present)
- Other political affiliations: Move Forward Party (2023–2024)

Bhuntin Noumjerm (Thai: ภัณฑิล น่วมเจิม), nicknamed Ta (Thai: ต้า) is a Thai politician and represents as a member of the House of Representatives for the People's Party.

== Life and career ==
Bhuntin Noumjerm was born on 1979 in Bangkok. He studied kindergarten at Anubanmitrdek and then studied elementary and middle school at Assumption College (Thailand). He studied high school at Triam Udom Suksa School. He got a degree on Engineering Management at Technische Universität Darmstadt.

Bhuntin started his political career and was involved in political activities with the Move Forward Party, serving as an adviser to the party's data center between 2018 and 2020. He later joined the Move Forward Party and was elected to the House of Representatives for Bangkok's 4th constituency in the 2023 Thai general election. Following the election results, he won the election and became one of the members of House of Representatives on July 4, 2023. After the dissolved of the Move Forward Party on 7 August 2024, he joined the People's.

In the 2026 Thai general election, Bhuntin was re-elected by the People's Party as its candidate for Bangkok Constituency 4.

== Controversy ==
In 2026, Bhuntin faced criticism over remarks made during a parliamentary debate on narcotics suppression. Community leaders in Khlong Toei accused him of portraying the community negatively and of making generalized statements about local drug problems, arguing that his comments damaged the area's reputation.
