= Anusorn Tamajai =

Member of the House of Representatives of Thailand

- อนุสรณ์ ธรรมใจ
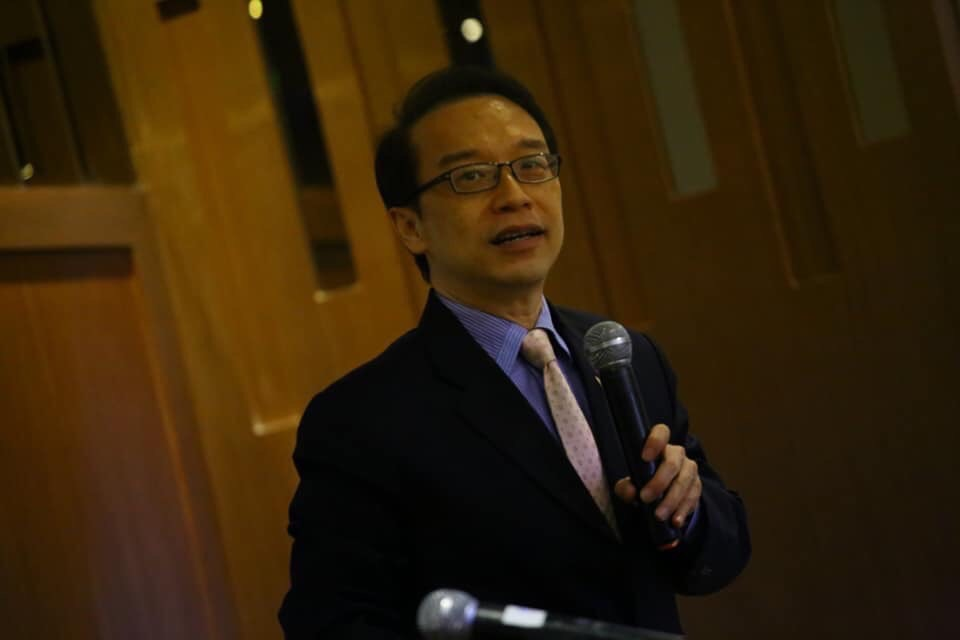

Member of the House of Representatives of Thailand
- Incumbent
- Assumed office 8 February 2026

Personal details
- Born: March 2, 1966 (age 60) Phrae province, Thailand

Anusorn Tamajai (Thai: อนุสรณ์ ธรรมใจ) is a Thai politician and academic, serving as a Member of Parliament for Bangkok. Anusorn is a member of the People's Party.

== Career ==
Anusorn is an economist, and previously served as dean of economics at the University of the Thai Chamber of Commerce.

During a visit by President of Myanmar Min Aung Hlaing to Thailand's parliament building, Anusorn shouted "For peace, for humanity" in protest, and was subsequently removed from the room by parliament police.
