= Chorayuth Chaturapornprasit =

Thai politician (born 1998)

- จรยุทธ จตุรพรประสิทธิ์

Member of the House of Representatives
- Incumbent
- Assumed office July 3, 2023

Personal details
- Born: June 8, 1985 (age 41) Bangkok, Thailand
- Party: People's (2024–present)
- Other political affiliations: Move Forward Party (2023–2024)

Chorayuth Chaturapornprasit (Thai: จรยุทธ จตุรพรประสิทธิ์, born 7 June, 1985), nicknamed Tonkla (Thai: บูม) is a Thai politician and represents as a member of the House of Representatives for the People's Party.

== Life and career ==
Chorayuth Chaturapornprasit was born on June 8, 1985 in Bangkok. He studied in elementary at Assumption College Samutprakarn and studied middle school at Bangkok Patana School before transferring to University Heights Academy. He got three degrees. English business at Ramkhamhaeng University, Public Law at Chulalongkorn University, and Master of Public Administration at Rattana-Bandit University.

Chorayuth entered politics as a member of the Move Forward Party. In the 2023 Thai general election, he contested Bangkok's 3rd constituency. During the campaign, he publicly raised concerns about errors in election materials distributed by the Election Commission and issues relating to the visibility of party logos in voter information booklets.

Following the dissolution of the House of Representatives in 2025, Chorayuth was re-elected in the 2026 Thai general election.

== Controversy ==
Chorayuth was blame for a physical altercation at a Bangkok restaurant, but defended that he was defending a woman who was being harassed. Thai spokesman Karoonpon Tieansuwan said that the other man had previously harassed Chorayuth’s friends and had slapped another person in the face before turning his attention to the MP.
