= Sasinan Thamnithinan =

Thai politician (born 1989)

- ศศินันท์ ธรรมนิฐินันท์

Member of the House of Representatives
- Incumbent
- Assumed office May 14, 2023
- Preceded by: Anudith Nakornthap

Personal details
- Born: February 17, 1986 (age 40) Kanchanaburi, Thailand
- Party: People's (2024–present)
- Other political affiliations: Move Forward Party (2023–2024)
- Parents: Nitikarn Thamanithinan (father); Sunisa Thamnithinan (mother)

Sasinan Thamnithinan (Thai: ศศินันท์ ธรรมนิฐินันท์), nicknamed Jam (Thai: แจม) is a Thai politician and represents as a member of the House of Representatives for the People's Party.

== Life and career ==
Sasinan Thamnithinan was born on February 17, 1986, in Kanchanaburi Province. She graduated with a Bachelor of Accountancy from Mahidol University, a Bachelor of Laws from Sukhothai Thammathirat Open University, and a Graduate Diploma in Public Law from Thammasat University.

Sasinan started her career as a full-time lawyer at Thai Lawyers for Human Rights after the 2014 Thai coup d'état.

Sasinan start her political career and got inspired by Prime Minister Thaksin Shinawatra. She ran as a Move Forward Party candidate in the 2023 Thai general election and was successfully elected as a Member of the House of Representatives for Bangkok's 11th district. Following the dissolution of the Party in 2024, she later joined the People's Party.

== Personal life ==
Sasinan was married to Teerawat Panyathammakul, a police officer. They had two children.

Sasinan has an interest in music, particularly acoustic guitar and ukulele. She previously uploaded song covers to her personal YouTube channel and participated in Academy Fantasia season 8, but she didn't make it through to the next round.
