= Theerarat Samrejvanich =

Thai politician

- ธีรรัตน์ สำเร็จวาณิชย์
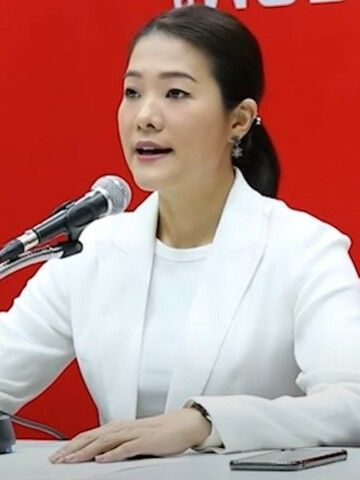

Deputy Minister of Interior
- Incumbent
- Assumed office 3 September 2024 Serving with Songsak Thongsri and Cahda Thaised
- Prime Minister: Paetongtarn Shinawatra; Anutin Charnvirakul
- Minister: Anutin Charnvirakul

Member of the House of Representatives
- Incumbent
- Assumed office 14 May 2023

Personal details
- Party: Pheu Thai

Theerarat Samrejwanich (Thai: ธีรรัตน์ สำเร็จวาณิชย์) is a Thai politician, serving as Deputy Minister of Interior since 2024. In the 2023 Thai general election, she was the only Pheu Thai member among Bangkok's 33 seats elected to the House of Representatives.

== Early life & education ==
Born on 13 July 1979 in Bangkok into a political family. Her father, Wiboon Samrejvanich, is a former Bangkok Metropolitan Council (MC) member representing Lat Krabang.

She earned a bachelor's degree in Communication Arts from Bangkok University, a Master of International Business from the University of Wollongong (UOW), and a Professional Doctorate in Education (Transdisciplinary Studies) from Central Queensland University, Australia.

== Career ==
In the 2023 general election, Theerarat won by a margin of 4 votes out of 90,000 cast over her competitor from the Move Forward Party.

However, in the 2026 general election, she was defeated by the People's Party candidate. Following the election, she was appointed by the party as Deputy Leader in charge of overseeing its operations in Bangkok. In the same year's Bangkok Metropolitan Council election, which was held concurrently with the Bangkok gubernatorial election, the Pheu Thai Party had officially resolved not to field any candidates for either the governorship or the council seats. However, Theerarat Samrejvanich, in her capacity as Deputy Party Leader responsible for Bangkok, believed that the party should still contest the election. She therefore established the Pheu Thai Balanced Life Group and fielded candidates in selected constituencies.

In Lat Krabang, a traditional political stronghold of her family, her niece, Chawanphat Samrejvanich, also ran as a candidate under the group's banner, but was not elected.

== Royal decorations ==
Theerarat her received the following royal decorations in the Honours System of Thailand:

- 2023 - Knight Grand Cordon of the Most Exalted Order of the White Elephant
- 2020 - Knight Grand Cordon of The Most Noble Order of the Crown of Thailand
