= Korkiat Korsoongsak =

Thai politician (born 1993)

- ก่อเกียรติ ก่อสูงศักดิ์

Member of the House of Representatives
- Incumbent
- Assumed office 8 February 2026
- Preceded by: Sirinpat Kongtrakarn
- Constituency: Bangkok-14 (Bangkapi, Wang Thonglang)

Personal details
- Born: Bangkok, Thailand
- Party: People's (2026–present)
- Education: University of Bristol (BA) London School of Economics and Political Science (Msc) Sasin School of Management (MBA)
- Occupation: Politician• Businessman

Korkiat Korsoongsak (Thai: ก่อเกียรติ ก่อสูงศักดิ์), nicknamed Ha (Thai: ฮา) is a Thai politician and a member of the House of Representatives for Bangkok District 14, representing the People's Party. He currently serves as a committee member and spokesperson of the House Committee on Foreign Affairs.

== Life and career ==
Korkiat Korsoongsak was born in Bangkok, Thailand. He earned a Bachelor of Arts (Honour) in History from the University of Bristol, followed by a Master’s degree in Economic History from London School of Economics and Political Science (LSE). He also holds an MBA from Sasin School of Management.

Before entering politics, Korkiat built a career in the private sector, working across manufacturing, real estate, and hospitality industries. In 2025, he joined the People’s Party and stood as the party's candidate for Bangkok's 14th constituency in the 2026 Thai general election, winning the seat with 41,528 votes.
