= Pongsoranat Thonglee =

Thai politician (born 1993)

- พงษ์สรณัฐ ทองลี

Member of the House of Representatives
- Incumbent
- Assumed office March 15, 2026
- Preceded by: Chaiyamparwaan Manpianjit

Personal details
- Born: September 23, 1993 (age 33) Bangkok, Thailand
- Party: People's Party
- Education: Assumption University (LLB)
- Profession: Lawyer, politician

Pongsoranat Thonglee (Thai: พงษ์สรณัฐ ทองลี), nicknamed Q (Thai: คิว) is a Thai politician and represents as a member of the House of Representatives for the People's Party.

== Biography ==
Pongsoranat Thonglee was born on 23 September 1993, in Bangkok, Thailand. He grew up in a business family. He studied his secondary education at Assumption College Thonburi before studying his grade nine to twelve years at Triam Udom Suksa School. Pongsoranat studied his university years at Assumption University, he later graduated with a degree on Bachelor of Laws. Before his politics career, he became a lawyer and was known as ทนายคิว.

Pongsoranat worked in the National Assembly of Thailand. From 2020 to 2023, he served as the committee secretary on Political Development, Mass Communications, and Public Participation. In the 2023 Thai general election, he was appointed secretary to Padipat Suntiphada, the First Deputy Speaker of the House of Representatives. He served until Padipat got removed from the office in 2024.

In 2026, Pongsoranat ran for the 2026 Thai general election for the Bangkok 26 constituency represented as the People's Party. He was elected with 44,271 votes, outwinning the other thirteen candidates.

== Personal life ==
After the previous representatives of his current constituency got expelled from the People's Party, he replaced his works and went on to win the Bangkok 26 constituency in the 2026 Thai general election.
