= Paramait Vithayaruksun =

Thai politician (born 1993)

- ปารเมศ วิทยารักษ์สรรค์

Member of the House of Representatives
- Incumbent
- Assumed office May 14, 2023

Personal details
- Born: September 16, 1993 (age 33) Bangkok, Thailand
- Party: People's (2024–present)
- Other political affiliations: Move Forward Party (2020–2024)

Paramait Vithayaruksun (Thai: ปารเมศ วิทยารักษ์สรรค์, born 16 September 1993), nicknamed Boom (Thai: บูม) is a Thai politician and represents as a member of the House of Representatives for the People's Party.

== Life and career ==
Paramait Vithayaruksun was born on September 16, 1993, in Bangkok to Thai Chinese people. When he was twelve years old, Paramait studied in New Zealand, before switched to China. He graduated at Fudan University in Shanghai.

Paramait began his career as a legal consultant, working with Chinese companies investing in Thailand and specializing in Thai–Chinese legal affairs. He became interests in political news and gets inspired by Thanathorn Juangroongruangkit and later involved in politics and joined the Move Forward Party in 2021. He worked on political campaigns and grassroots outreach in Bangkok before contesting the Bangkok 1 constituency in the 2023 Thai general election. He was subsequently elected to the House of Representatives as one of the youngest members of parliament from the Party. Following the dissolution of the party in 2024, he joined the People's Party and continued serving as a member of parliament.

== Royal decorations ==
- 2025 – Knight Commander (Second Class) of the Most Exalted Order of the Crown of Thailand
