= Ekkarach Udomumnuay =

Thai politician (born 1985)

- เอกราช อุดมอำนวย

Member of the House of Representatives
- Incumbent
- Assumed office May 4, 2023

Personal details
- Born: May 9, 1985 (age 41) Bangkok, Thailand
- Party: People's (2024–present)
- Other political affiliations: Move Forward Party (2023–2024)

Ekkarach Udomumnuay (Thai: เอกราช อุดมอำนวย), nicknamed Jorjan (Thai: จอจาน) is a Thai politician and represents as a member of the House of Representatives for the People's Party.

== Life and career ==
Ekkarach Udomumnuay was born in 1985 in Bangkok. He studied elementary and middle school at Rittiyawannalai School. In total, he got three degress, Bachelor of Education at Rajamangala University of Technology Thanyaburi, Jurisprudence at Sukhothai Thammathirat Open University, and Journalism and Mass Communication at Thammasat University.

Ekkarach started his political career in 2023, he ran as a candidate for the Move Forward Party in the 2023 Thai general election. He contested Bangkok's 10th constituency. He successfully won the seat, securing a place in the 26th House of Representatives. Following the dissolution of the Party in 2024, Ekkarach later joined the People's.

In the 2026 Thai general election, he was re-elected as the candidate for Bangkok 10th constituency outf of 15 parties, with 41,804 votes

== Controversy ==
Ekkarach was a pro-democracy activist. In 2019, amidst growing public frustration over repeated election delays by the National Council for Peace and Order military junta, he staged a highly publicized protest at the Victory Monument. He shaved his head bald and made a hunger strike. On the first day of his protest, police officers from the Phayathai Police Station detained him, citing a technical violation of the Public Assembly Act for failing to provide a 24-hour advance notice. After his release, he continued his protest. On January 14, 2019, he marched to the Election Commission headquarters to submit a letter demanding electoral transparency.
