= Surachet Pravinvongvuth =

Thai politician (born 1978)

- สุรเชษฐ์ ประวีณวงศ์วุฒิ
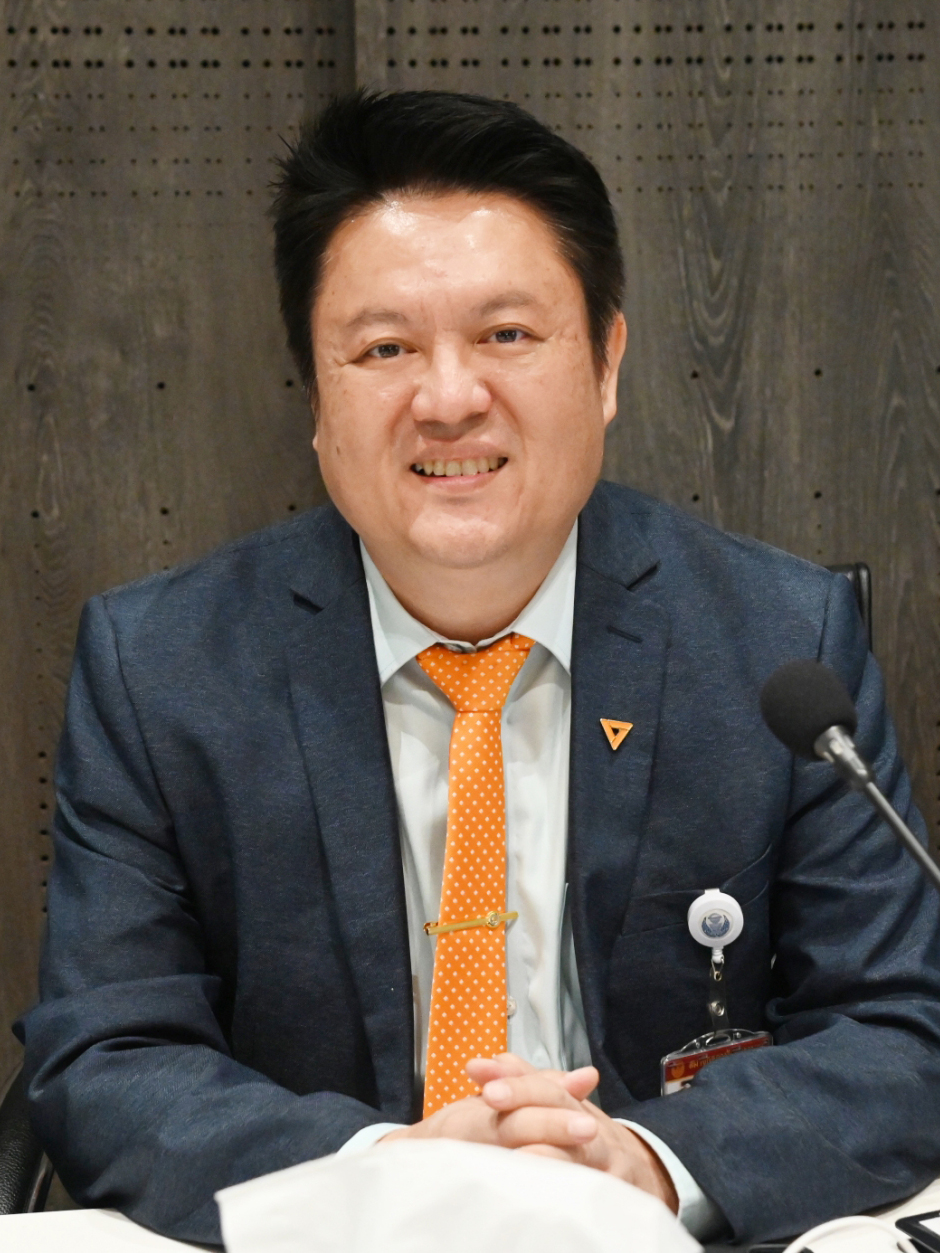
- Surachet in 2025

Member of the House of Representatives
- Incumbent
- Assumed office 14 May 2023

Chairperson, House Committee on Budgeting Study and Budget Administration Follow-Up
- Incumbent
- Assumed office 22 August 2024

Deputy Secretary-General of the Move Forward Party
- In office 14 March 2020 – 7 August 2024

Personal details
- Born: February 3, 1978 (age 48)
- Party: People's Party (since 2024)
- Education: Utah State University (PhD)

Surachet Pravinvongvuth (Thai: สุรเชษฐ์ ประวีณวงศ์วุฒิ, RTGS: Surachet Prawinwongwut; born 3 February 1978) is a Thai politician and former academic. He currently serves as a Member of the Thai House of Representatives, elected through the party-list system, representing the People's Party, the de facto successor to the Move Forward Party. He is also the Chairperson of the Committee on Budgeting Study and Budget Administration Follow-Up. Previously, he served as a faculty member at the Asian Institute of Technology (AIT), with professional expertise in transportation systems.

== Biography ==
Surachet was born on 3 February 1978 in Bangkok. He earned a Bachelor’s degree in civil engineering from Chulalongkorn University (1999), a Master’s degree in infrastructure planning and management from the Asian Institute of Technology (2001), and a Ph.D. in transportation engineering from Utah State University, USA

== Career ==
Surachet has worked as a researcher and visiting lecturer at several academic and research institutions both in Thailand and abroad, including in Norway and the United States. He has held over 20 positions as chairperson, vice chairperson, secretary, or member in various committees, sub-committees, working groups, and procurement or project-monitoring bodies, many of which focused on achieving targeted policy outcomes.

His diverse hands-on experience, especially as Head of the Traffic System Research and Development Department at the Expressway Authority of Thailand, led to his appointment as full-time faculty at AIT, where he served in the Transportation Engineering program under the School of Engineering and Technology. He was also awarded an Outstanding Lecturer recognition.

In March 2018, Surachet resigned from AIT and joined Thanathorn Juangroongruangkit and a group of like-minded individuals to establish the Future Forward Party. He was elected as the 8th-ranked party-list MP in the 2019 Thai general election. Following the dissolution of the party by the Constitutional Court, he, along with his fellow MPs from the same party, joined the Move Forward Party, where he became Deputy Secretary-General and was re-elected as a party-list MP in the 2023 general election. Following the dissolution of the party, again by the Constitutional Court, he, along with his fellow MPs from the same party, joined the People's Party.

During his first term in parliament, Surachet, serving as the party’s transportation expert, played a key role in scrutinizing and debating the Ministry of Transport’s performance under the government of General Prayut Chan-o-cha, with Saksayam Chidchob as Minister of Transport. His noteworthy debates included criticism of budget allocation disparities favoring Buriram, corruption allegations concerning the Orange Line electric railway project, and critiques of the government’s MR-MAP (Motorway and Railway Master Plan).

Under the Srettha Thavisin and Paetongtarn Shinawatra administration, with Suriya Juangroongruangkit as Minister of Transport, Surachet has continued to lead in policy debates, covering issues such as the government’s 20-baht flat fare policy, the Land Bridge project, the High-Speed Rail Linking Three Airports Project, and the submission of new bills on railways, common transport tickets, and decentralized transport management.

=== Member of the House of Representatives ===
Surachet has been elected as a party-list Member of the House of Representatives for two terms:

- 2019 Thai general election, representing the Future Forward Party, and later the Move Forward Party; and
- 2023 Thai general election, representing the Move Forward Party, and later People's Party.

=== Standing Committee Memberships ===
- Chairperson, House Committee on Budgeting Study and Budget Administration Follow-Up (2024–present)
- Vice Chairperson, House Committee on Budgeting Study and Budget Administration Follow-Up (2019–2024)
- Vice Chairperson, House Committee on Transport (2019–present)
- Chairperson, Sub-Committee on Budget Scrutiny and Evaluation for Major Infrastructure Projects under the House Committee on Budgeting Study and Budget Administration Follow-Up (2023)
- Vice Chairperson, Sub-Committee on Road Safety Legislation Oversight under the House Committee on Transport (2022–2023)
- Chairperson, Sub-Committee on Innovation for Traffic and Transport Solutions under the House Committee on Transport (2021–2022)
- Vice Chairperson, Sub-Committee on Solutions for State Railway of Thailand Issues under the House Committee on Transport (2020–2021)
- Chairperson, Sub-Committee on Budget Scrutiny and Evaluation for Major Infrastructure Projects under the House Committee on Budgeting Study and Budget Administration Follow-Up (2020–2023)
- Advisor, Sub-Committee on Budget Oversight for the Suvarnabhumi Airport Terminal 2 Project under the House Committee on Budgeting Study and Budget Administration Follow-Up (2019–2020)
- Vice Chairperson, Sub-Committee on Road and Traffic Safety Studies under the House Committee on Transport (2019–2020)

=== Budgetary, Ad Hoc Committee Memberships ===
- Member, Ad Hoc Committee on the Draft Annual Budget Act for Fiscal Year 2025
- Vice Chairperson, Sub-Committee on Integrated Work Plan 1 under the Ad Hoc Committee on the Draft Annual Budget Act for Fiscal Year 2025
- Member, Ad Hoc Committee on the Draft Annual Budget Act for Fiscal Year 2024
- Vice Chairperson, Sub-Committee on Integrated Work Plan 1 under the Ad Hoc Committee on the Draft Annual Budget Act for Fiscal Year 2023
- Vice Chairperson, Sub-Committee on State Enterprises, Science, Research, Technology Transfer, and Revolving Funds under the Ad Hoc Committee on the Draft Annual Budget Act for Fiscal Year 2022
- Vice Chairperson, Sub-Committee on Land and Infrastructure under the Ad Hoc Committee on the Draft Annual Budget Act for Fiscal Year 2021
- Vice Chairperson, Ad Hoc Committee on the Draft Annual Budget Act for Fiscal Year 2020
- Advisor to the Chairperson, Sub-Committee on Equipment, Land, Construction, and State Enterprises under the Ad Hoc Committee on the Draft Annual Budget Act for Fiscal Year 2020

=== Legislative, Ad Hoc Committee Memberships ===
- Vice Chairperson, Ad Hoc Committee on the Draft Mass Rapid Transit of Thailand Act (2025)
- Vice Chairperson, Ad Hoc Committee on the Draft Common Ticketing System Management Act (2025)
- Vice Chairperson, Ad Hoc Committee on the Draft Rail Transport Act (2024–2025)
- Vice Chairperson, Ad Hoc Committee on the Draft Architect Act (No. 2), B.E. 2566 (2021–2022)

=== Other, Ad Hoc Committee Memberships ===
- Vice Chairperson, Ad Hoc Committee on the Monitoring and Oversight of the Use of Emergency Decrees for Economic and Social Relief and Recovery from the COVID-19 Pandemic (2020–2021)
- Member and Advisor, Ad Hoc Committee on the Study of the Thai Canal and Development of the Southern Economic Corridor (2020–2021)
- Vice Chairperson, Ad Hoc Committee on the Study of the Expressway and BTS Concession Extensions (2019)

=== Other Committee Memberships ===
- Chairperson, Thailand–Switzerland Parliamentary Friendship Group (2023–present)
- Member, Opposition Coordination Committee in the House of Representatives (2020–present)
- Member and Secretary, Executive Committee of the Thailand–Switzerland Parliamentary Friendship Group (2021–2023)
- Executive Member, Thailand–United States Parliamentary Friendship Group (2022–2023)

=== Work Experience ===
- Member of the House of Representatives (two terms, 2019–present)
- Assistant Professor, Asian Institute of Technology (2014–2019)
- Head of Safety Planning and Traffic Department, Expressway Authority of Thailand (2013–2014)
- Head of Traffic R&D Department, Expressway Authority of Thailand (2011–2013)
- Senior Engineer at an engineering consultancy in the USA (2008–2010)
- Engineer at an engineering consultancy in the USA (2001–2006)
- Research Assistant, Utah State University, USA

== Awards ==
- 2020 — Knight Commander (Second Class), The Most Noble Order of the Crown of Thailand.
