= Puriwat Chaisamran =

Thai politician (born 1978)

- ภูริวรรธก์ ใจสำราญ

Member of the House of Representatives
- Incumbent
- Assumed office 14 May 2023
- Preceded by: Anusorn Panthong

Personal details
- Born: 1978 (age 47–48) Bangkok, Thailand
- Party: People's (2024–present)
- Other political affiliations: Move Forward Party (2023–2024)

Puriwat Chaisamran (Thai: ภูริวรรธก์ ใจสำราญ), nicknamed Bobo (Thai: โบโบ้) is a Thai politician and represents as a member of the House of Representatives for the People's Party.

== Life and career ==
Puriwat Chaisamran was born in 1978, in Bangkok, Thailand. He finished highschool at Satriwitthaya 2 School. He then earned a Bachelor degree in political science at Kasetsart University. He later continued his academic training at Chulalongkorn University, graduating with a master degree in Political Science.

Puriwat started his career as an entrepreneur and business manager. He served as the owner of Mass Exhibition Company Limited. He then started his political career when he joined the Move Forward Party. In 2023 Thai general election. He became the candidate of the House of Representatives when he won the seat for Bangkok 12. Following the dissolution of the Party in 2024, he later joined the People's Party.

In the 2026 Thai general election, he was re-elected for the Bangkok 4 constituency with 49,925 votes, outwinning the other 16 candidates.
