= Akaradej Wongpitakroj =

Thai politician (born 1976)

Akaradej Wongpitakroj MWM PCh
- อัครเดช วงษ์พิทักษ์โรจน์
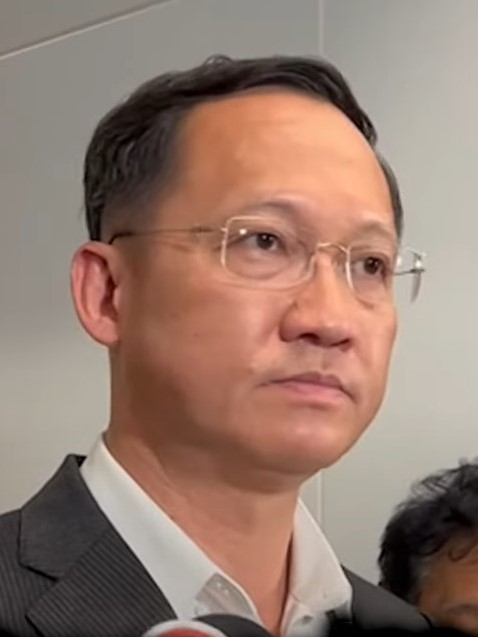

Member of the 25th House of Representatives
- Incumbent
- Assumed office 29 March 2019
- Preceded by: Chaworalut Chinthammamitr
- Constituency: Ratchaburi-4

Personal details
- Born: 19 September 1976 (age 50) Ban Pong, Ratchaburi, Thailand
- Party: Democrat Party
- Parent: Vutipong Wongpitakroj (father)
- Education: Chulalongkorn University; Khon Kaen University

Akaradej Wongpitakroj (Thai: อัครเดช วงษ์พิทักษ์โรจน์; born 19 September 1976), usually known by his nickname "Mung" (มุ่ง), is a Thai Democrat Party politician who represented Ratchaburi province in the 25th House of Representatives.

== Biography and political career ==
Akaradej was born in Ban Pong district, northernmost Ratchaburi province to a Thai-Chinese father, Vutipong Wongpitakroj, a local businessman who owns a major construction material trading business.

He graduated with a bachelor's degree from Faculty of Science, Chulalongkorn University and received a master's degree in business administration from Khon Kaen University.

Before becoming a politician, he ran the family's business.

Akaradej was an MP for Ratchaburi province (fourth district, covering the entirety of Ban Pong) in the general election on March 24, 2019 by defeating the former MP Chaworalut Chinthammamitr of the Palang Pracharath Party, with 37,423 votes for Akaradej, and 32,677 votes for Chaworalut. He is also considered the only Democrat candidate in this election to be an MP in the areas that did not vote Democrat before, due to the declining popularity of the party.

After election, he was appointed deputy spokesman for the Democrat Party.
