= Akara Tongjaisod =

Thai politician (born 1987)

- อัคร ทองใจสด
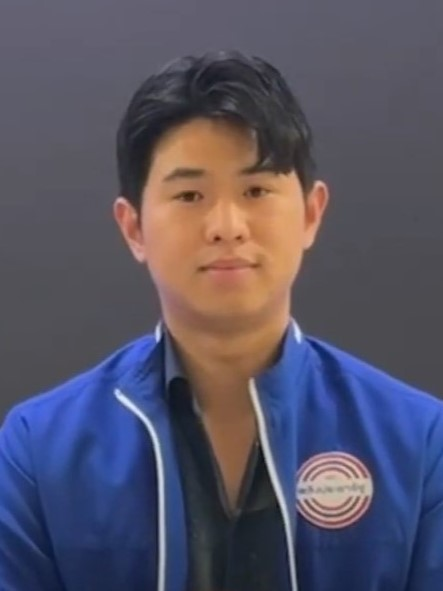
- Akara in 2024

Member of the House of Representatives
- Incumbent
- Assumed office 14 March 2024

Personal details
- Born: 15 July 1997 (age 29) Wichian Buri, Phetchabun Province, Thailand
- Party: Bhumjaithai Party (2025–present)
- Other political affiliations: Palang Pracharath Party (2020–2025)
- Spouse: Thanchanok Thangviboonpanich
- Parents: Jittana Tongjaisod (father); Akaradej Tongjaisod (mother)
- Relatives: Iam Tongjaisod

Akara Tongjaisod (Thai: อัคร ทองใจสด) is a Thai politician. He was elected as a Palang Pracharath Party member of the House of Representatives for Phetchabun 6, at the 2023 Thai general election.

He was educated at Saint Kentigern College, Mahidol University, and holds an MA in political economy from King's College London.
