= Sinthop Kaewphichit =

Thai politician

Sinthop Kaewphichit MWM PCh 2nd Class PCh 1st Class
- สินธพ แก้วพิจิตร

Member of the 25th House of Representatives
- Incumbent
- Assumed office 24 March 2019
- Constituency: Nakhon Pathom-1

Personal details
- Born: 25 June 1971 (age 55) Nakhon Pathom, Nakhon Pathom Province, Thailand
- Party: Chartthaipattana (2011-2018); Democrat (2018-present)
- Spouse: Juthamas Kaewphichit (née Thongsukmak) (m. 2004)
- Parents: Sunthorn Kaewphichit (father); Oradee Kaewphichit (mother)
- Profession: Politician; soldier

Military service
- Allegiance: Thailand
- Branch/service: Royal Thai Army
- Rank: Lieutenant Colonel

Sinthop Kaewphichit (Thai: สินธพ แก้วพิจิตร) is a Thai politician who served as an MP for Nakhon Pathom province in the 25th House of Representatives and former military officer in Royal Thai Army (RTA). He is familiarly known as "Se Kaew" (เสธ.แก้ว).

== Biography and political career ==
Sinthop (nickname: Kaew) was born at Mueang Nakhon Pathom District, Nakhon Pathom Province in politician family. His father Sunthorn Kaewphichit is a veteran and influential local politician of Nakhon Pathom, especially in the downtown Nakhon Pathom area. His older brother Somphat Kaewphichit was an MP for Nakhon Pathom province and was formerly an executive committee member of the Chart Thai Party.

He graduated from Armed Forces Academies Preparatory School (AFAPS; class 32), and Chulachomklao Royal Military Academy (CRMA; class 43), he also holds a master's degree in engineering management from The George Washington University and a PhD in computational sciences and informatics from George Mason University.

After graduating with a bachelor's degree from CRMA, he was enlisted in the military. The last position is the Chief of Staff of the Commander Under the Office of the Secretary of the Army and received the highest rank of lieutenant colonel (LT COL).

He entered politics for the first time in the 2011 general election, when he was elected as a constituency MP in Nakhon Pathom constituency one (most of downtown Nakhon Pathom), replacing his brother Somphat who had been stripped of political rights and died in the meantime. He was elected as an MP under the Chartthaipattana Party.

In the 2019 general election, Sinthop moved to the Democrat Party and was elected again by narrowly defeating the candidate from the Future Forward Party. The Election Commission has implemented a new vote count, but he was still a winner.

After the election, he was appointed deputy secretary-general of the Democrat Party.
