= Suphanat Minchainant =

Thai politician (born 1991)

Suphanat Minchaiynunt
- ศุภณัฐ มีนชัยนันท์
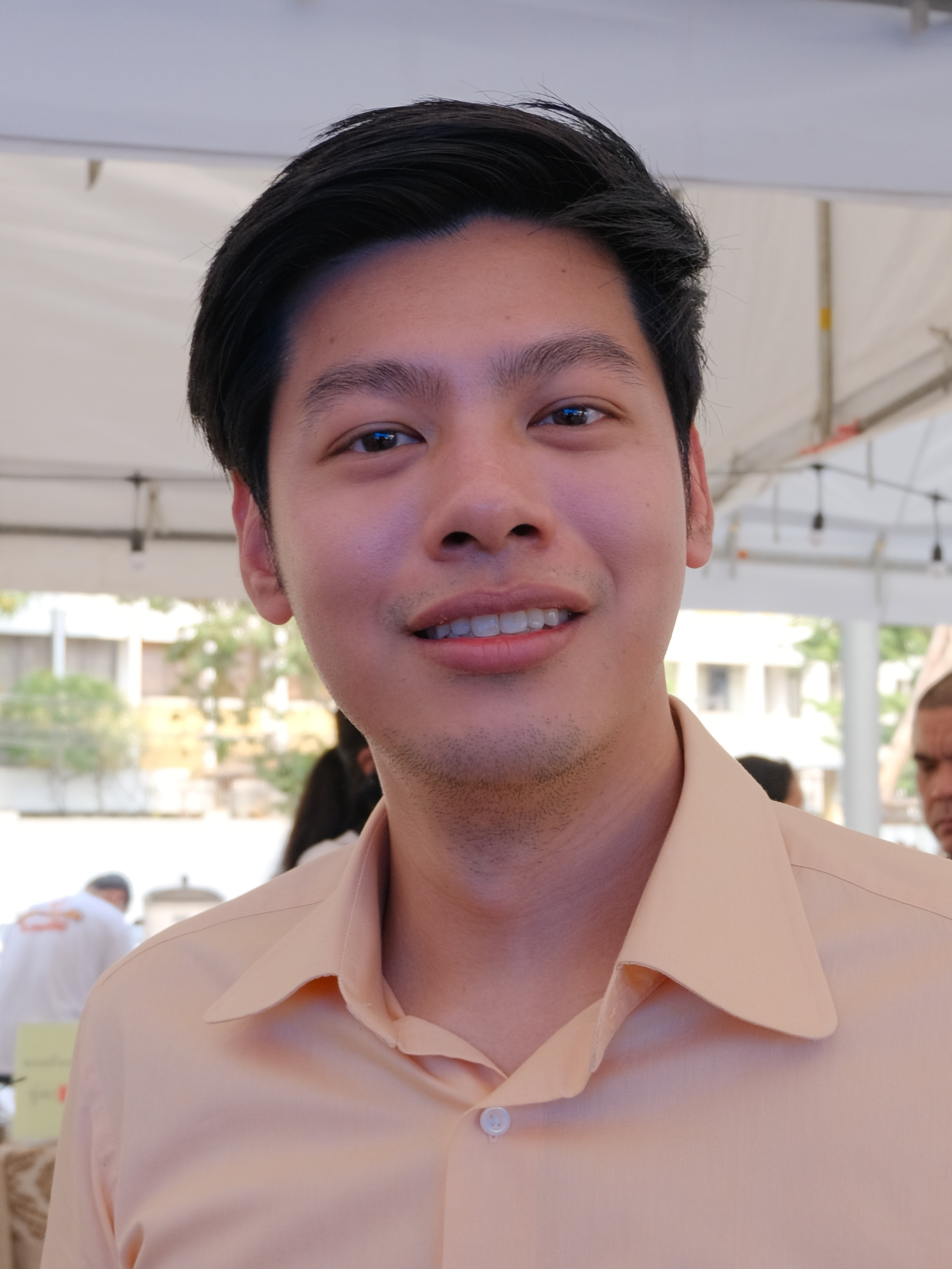
- Suphanat in 2023

Member of the House of Representatives
- Incumbent
- Assumed office 14 March 2023

Personal details
- Born: 19 July 1991 (age 35) Bangkok, Thailand
- Party: People's (2024–present)
- Other political affiliations: Move Forward Party (2023–2024)
- Relations: Suthee Meanchainun; Vicharn Minchainant
- Parents: Visut Minchaiynunt (father); Sopit Minchaiynunt (mother)
- Education: Queen's College, Cambridge

Suphanat Minchaiynunt (Thai: ศุภณัฐ มีนชัยนันท์, born 19 July 1991), nicknamed Bank (Thai: แบงค์) is a Thai politician who served as a Bangkok Member of the House of Representatives for the People's Party.

== Early life ==
Suphanat Minchaiynunt was born on July 19, 1991, in Bangkok. He studied elementary and highschool at Saint Gabriel's College and King Edward's School, Witley. He got a bachelor degree in Project Management for Construction at University College London (UCL), followed by a degree in Master of Philosophy (MPhil) in Real Estate Finance at Queens' College, University of Cambridge.

== Career ==
After earning his degree, Suphanat returned to Thailand to manage his own businesses as well as his family's enterprises. Together, these comprise more than six companies operating across the construction, real estate, transportation, and healthcare sectors.

Suphanat began his political career after joining Move Forward Party in 2022. He was subsequently selected as the party's candidate for Chatuchak, a constituency in Bangkok. In the 2023 Thai general election, Suphanat was elected as a Member of the House of Representatives for Bangkok’s 9th constituency with 50,132 votes - the highest number of votes received by any constituency candidate in Bangkok. In the 2026 Thai general election, Suphanat was re-elected as a Member of the House of Representatives for Bangkok, securing a second term in office.

== Parliamentary career ==
=== Calls for improvements to Chatuchak Bus Terminal (Mochit 2) ===
In 2023, Suphanat highlighted 14 problems at the Chatuchak Bus Terminal (Mochit 2), the largest bus terminal in Thailand, in an online post. He was widely praised for drawing attention to issues affecting low-income passengers who rely on the terminal but often lack the means or influence to raise concerns with authorities. These issues included safety and terminal management concerns, taxi fare scams, poor connections to public bus services, and the closure of the terminal’s medical and nursing rooms.

The post received millions of views and prompted members of the public to share their own experiences. It also became a on eof the most trending topics on Twitter during the New Year holiday, leading to widespread calls for improvements to the facility. Following the public response, the Prime Minister, Srettha Thavisin, instructed relevant agencies to address the reported issues, while the Minister and Deputy Ministers of Transport, together with officials from several agencies, conducted inspections of the terminal. During the 2024 Songkran festival, Suphanat revisited the site with Pita Limjaroenrat to monitor progress, with members of the public commenting on improvements to the station and expressing appreciation for his continued attention to the issue.

=== Bangkok City Plan ===
Suphanat drew widespread public attention to the proposed revision of the Bangkok Comprehensive Plan after publicly raising concerns over its planning and consultation process. He argued that the draft had been prepared without meaningful public participation and that several zoning and development provisions disproportionately benefited major property developers and large landowners, leading to wider public debate over what became known as “pro-developer city plan”.

Among the issues he raised were proposed changes to land-use zoning that would grant greater development rights to specific plots owend by major property developers including shopping mall owners and landowners in central Bangkok, while neighbouring properties remained subject to different restrictions. He also questioned the city-wide FAR Bonus system, arguing that incentives should be tailored to local needs and offer area-specific public benefits in exchange for additional development rights.

Chadchart Sittipunt, a Mayor of Bangkok, responded by urging the public to refrain from using the phrase "pro-developer city plan", arguing that it was divisive. The exchange generated public backlash, after which Chadchart later issued a public apology on Facebook. The Bangkok Metropolitan Administration extended the public consultation period by six months and announced that it would review the draft plan.

=== Public Transport Reform ===
Suphanat has frequently raised issues relating to Bangkok’s public bus system. In 2024, he questioned Deputy Minister of Transport Surapong Piyachote over bus shortages, the ageing Bangkok Mass Transit Authority (BMTA) fleet, and the absence of a BMTA board for more than 14 months, which had stalled the procurement of new buses. Following his calls for the issue to be addressed, the Cabinet appointed a new board two weeks later, enabling the BMTA to move forward with its 15 billion baht plan to lease 1,520 electric buses and The Department of Land Transport to begin studying additional bus routes in areas surrounding Bangkok.

== Royal decorations ==
- 2025 – Knight Commander (Second Class) of the Most Exalted Order of the Crown of Thailand

== Personal life ==
Suphanat is the nephew of Vicharn Minchainant, former Ministry of Public Health, and the great nephew of Suthee Meanchainun, billionaire businessman.
