= Vicharn Minchainant =

Thai politician (born 1960)

- วิชาญ มีนชัยนันท์
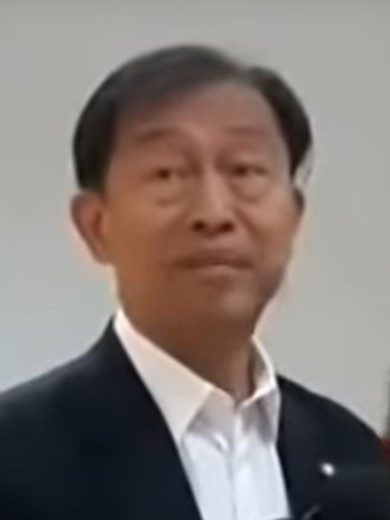

Deputy Minister of Public Health
- In office 23 May 2008 – 9 September 2008
- Prime Minister: Samak Sundaravej
- Preceded by: Chaovarat Chanweerakul
- In office 24 September 2008 – 2 December 2008
- Prime Minister: Somchai Wongsawat
- Succeeded by: Manit Nopamornbodee

Personal details
- Born: 24 July 1960 (age 66) Bangkok, Thailand
- Party: Pheu Thai Party
- Education: Thammasat university

Vicharn Minchainant (Thai: วิชาญ มีนชัยนันท์, born July 24, 1960) is a Thai politician. He is a former Deputy Minister of Ministry of Public Health, a Bangkok Member of Parliament, deputy leader of Pheu Thai Party and leader of Pheu Thai Bangkok MPs.

== Background and education ==
Vicharn was born at Min Buri, Bangkok, to Mr. Paitune and Mrs. Supatra Minchainant. He is a nephew of Dr. Suthee Minchaiynunt, a billionaire, landowner, philanthropist, and the Honourable President for Life of Thai-Chinese Chamber of Commerce. Vicharn married Jintana Minchainant (Thai: จินตนา มีนชัยนันท์) and have 4 children.

One of Vicharn's brothers, Wirat Minchainant (Thai: วิรัตน์ มีนชัยนันท์), was a three-time Member of the Bangkok Metropolitan Council.

His nephew, Suphanat Minchainant, is a two time Member of House of Representatives.

Vicharn holds a Master of Arts degree (Political Science in Public Administration) from Thammasat University.

== Political career ==
Vicharn began his political career with Democrat Party. At the age of 25, Vicharn became a member and a chairman of Min Buri District Council. He was voted as a member of the Bangkok Metropolitan Council for two times in 1994 and 1998, and served as the 1st vice-chairman of the Bangkok Metropolitan Council.

Vicharn joined Thai Rak Thai Party in 2000 and became a Bangkok Member of Parliament, representing Min Buri and Khlong Sam Wa Districts. Since then, he has won all national elections in 2001, 2005, 2006 (void), 2007, and 2011. He is one of a very few Bangkok MPs who has won the elections more than 4 times in a row.

In 2008, Vicharn was appointed as the Deputy Minister of Public Health in two cabinets; under Prime Minister Samak Sundaravej and Prime Minister Somchai Wongsawat. He served as Acting Minister of Public Health after the Constitutional Court ordered Health Minister Chaiya Sasomsub to quit.

== Political position ==
- 2011: Bangkok Member of Parliament, Pheu Thai Party (term 4)
- 2010: Deputy leader of Pheu Thai Party (resigned 2011)
- 2008: Deputy Minister of Public Health under Prime Minister Somchai Wongsawat
- 2008: Deputy Minister of Public Health under Prime Minister Samak Sundaravej
- 2007: Bangkok Member of Parliament, People's Power Party (term 3)
- 2006: Bangkok Member of Parliament, Thai Rak Thai Party (void)
- 2005: Chairman of the Committee on Consumer Protection
- 2004: Assistant Secretary to the Minister of Education
- 2001: Bangkok Member of Parliament, Thai Rak Thai Party (term 2)
- 2001: Vice Chairman of the Committee on Budget Administration Follow-up of the House of Parliament
- 2001: Bangkok Member of Parliament, Thai Rak Thai Party (term 1)
- 1998: 1st vice-chairman of the Bangkok Metropolitan Council
- 1998: Member of the Bangkok Metropolitan Council, Min Buri District (term 2)
- 1994: Member of the Bangkok Metropolitan Council, Min Buri District (term 1)
- 1985: Chairman of Min Buri District Council
- 1985: Member of Min Buri District Council (2 terms)

== Royal decorations ==
- 2008 – Knight Grand Cordon (Special Class) of the Most Exalted Order of the White Elephant
- 2005 – Knight Grand Cordon (Special Class) of The Most Noble Order of the Crown of Thailand
