= Taopiphop Limjittrakorn =

Thai politician

- เท่าพิภพ ลิ้มจิตรกร
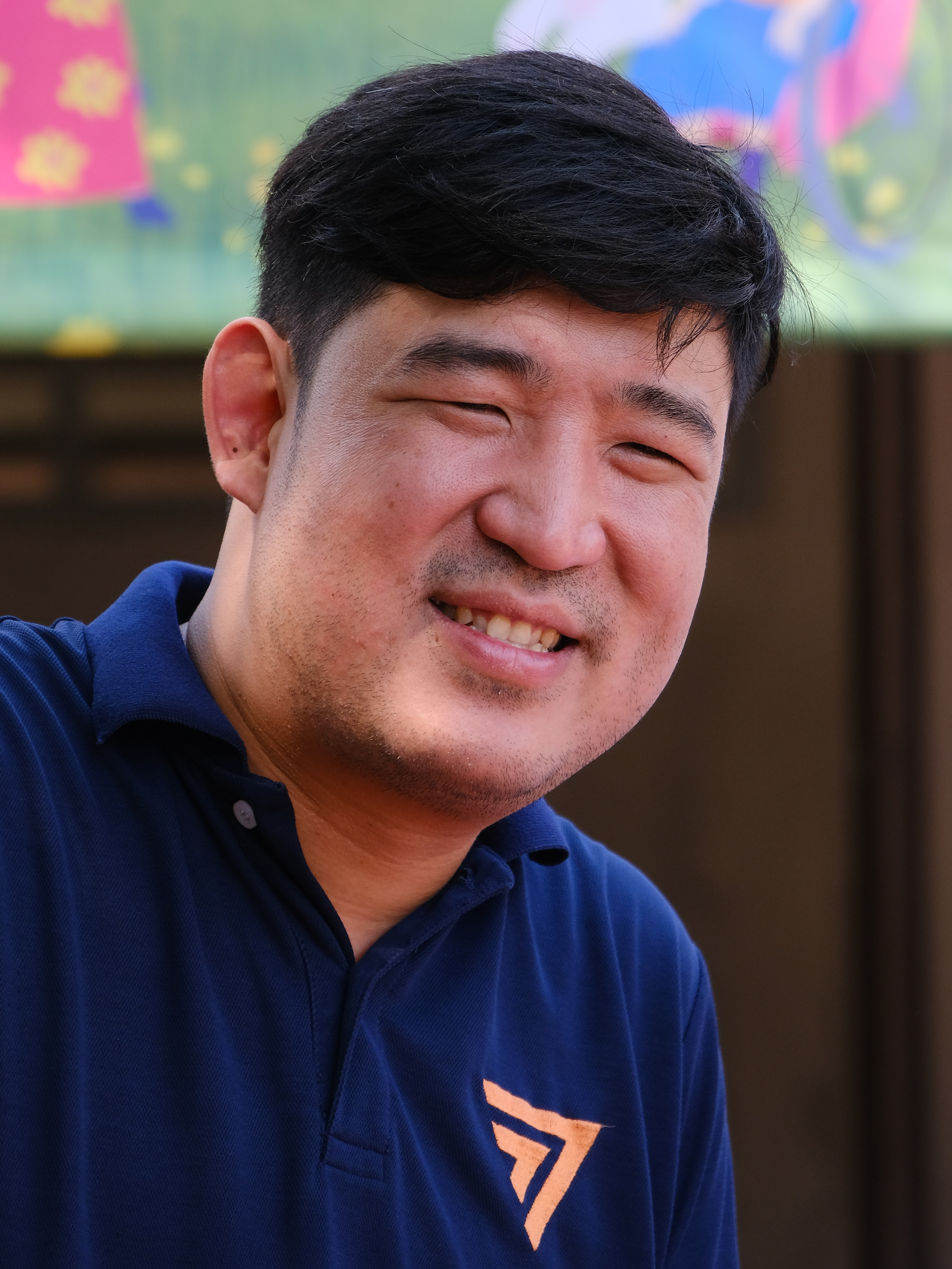

Member of the House of Representatives
- Incumbent
- Assumed office 24 March 2019

Personal details
- Party: People's

Taopiphop Limjittrakorn (Thai: เท่าพิภพ ลิ้มจิตรกร) is a Thai brewer and politician. Taopiphop currently serves as a member of the House of Representatives for the People's Party. He has advocated for the liberalization of Thailand's strict liquor laws, arguing that the current legislation supports monopolies and discourages home brewers. Taopiphop was previously arrested for illegal brewing. Thailand's alcohol industry is currently dominated by Boon Rawd Brewery and ThaiBev, which as of 2024 control 58% and 34.3% of the beer market, respectively.

In October 2024, Taopiphop's bill to liberalize the liquor industry was rejected 237 to 137 by the House of Representatives.
