= Thai Ruam Palang Party =

Thai Ruam Palang Party พรรคไทรวมพลัง
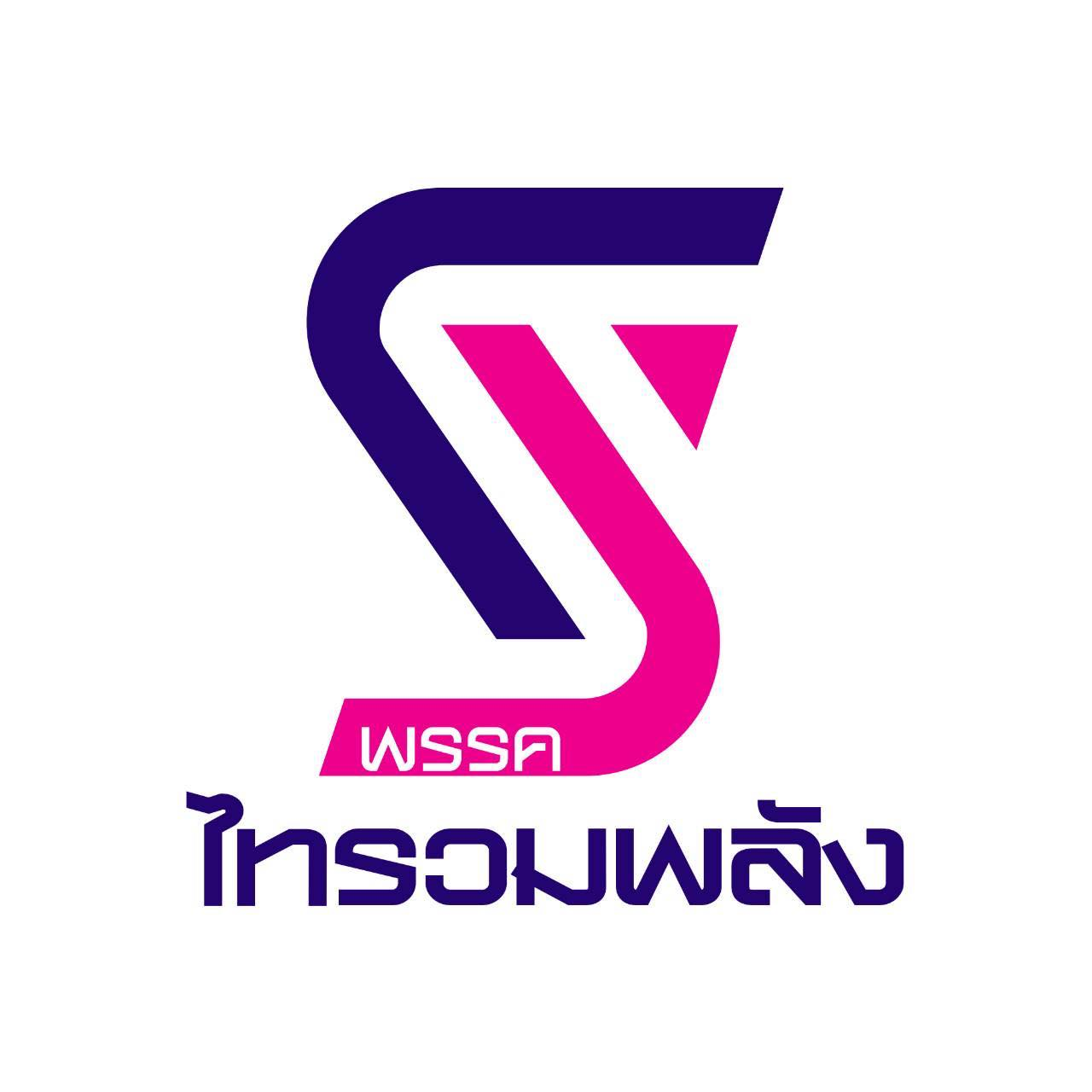
- Abbreviation: TRP
- Leader: Chitrawan Wangsuphakijkosol
- Secretary: Wasawat Puangphonsri
- Founded: 25 October 2021
- Headquarters: 608 Moo 12 Rai Noi Subdistrict Ubon Ratchathani, Ubon Ratchathani province
- Membership (2023): 7,579
- Colors: Purple
- House of Representatives: 6 / 500

The Thai Ruamphalang Party (Thai: พรรคไทรวมพลัง, RTGS: Thai Ruamphalang, lit. 'Thai Joint Force Party'), formerly known as the "Pheu Thai Ruam Power Party", is a political party in Thailand. It became politically relevant after the 2023 general election when the party unexpectedly won 2 seats in the Ubon Ratchatani province. It is unrelated to the similarly named Pheu Thai Party, though some observers in the 2023 election questioned whether the similarity was intentional and confused voters.

== History ==
The party was founded on 25 October 2021 by Wasawat Puangphonsri who also acts as the party's leader. The first party office is located at 122/91 Moo 6, Suthep Subdistrict, Mueang Chiang Mai District Chiang Mai Province.

== Election results ==
=== General elections ===
Election	Total seats won	Total votes	Share of votes	Outcome of election	Election leader
2023	2 / 500	66,476	0.18%	▲2; Junior partner in governing coalition	Wasawat Puangphonsri
