= Chayaphon Satondee =

Thai politician (born 1995)

- ชยพล สท้อนดี

Member of the House of Representatives
- Incumbent
- Assumed office July 4, 2023

Personal details
- Born: 1995 (age 30–31) Bangkok, Thailand
- Party: People's (2024–present)
- Other political affiliations: Move Forward Party (2023–2024)

Chayaphon Satondee (Thai: ชยพล สท้อนดี), nicknamed Goody (Thai: กู๊ดดี้) is a Thai politician and represents as a member of the House of Representatives for the People's Party.

== Life and career ==
Chayaphon Satondee was born on 1995 in Bangkok. He studied in Armed Forces Academies Preparatory School and Chitralada School. He got a degree in Aerospace Engineering at Chulalongkorn University.

Chayaphon started his political career as a member of the Move Forward Party. In the 2023 Thai general election, he was elected to the House of Representatives for Bangkok's 8th constituency. Following the dissolution of the Party in 2024, he joined the People's Party.

In the 2026 Thai general election, Chayaphon won and was re-elected out of 16 parties. He continued to represent Bangkok's 8th constituency.

== Personal life ==
Chayaphon worked as a commercial pilot. During the COVID-19 pandemic, he became involved in volunteer relief efforts in Bangkok. The experiences increased his contributed to his decision to started his career in politics.
