= People's Party (Thailand) =

Thai progressive political party

People's Party พรรคประชาชน
- Abbreviation: PPLE
- Leader: Natthaphong Ruengpanyawut
- Secretary-General: Phicharn Chaowapatanawong
- Spokesperson: Pukkamon Nunarnan
- Founded: 7 August 2012; (Thinkakhao Party); 30 November 2018; (Thinkakhao Chaovilai Party); 9 August 2024; (People's Party)
- Legalised: 7 August 2012; (Thinkakhao Party); 27 August 2024; (People's Party)
- Preceded by: Move Forward (de facto)
- Headquarters: 167 Future Forward Building, Bang Kapi, Bangkok, Thailand
- Think tank: Think Forward Center
- Membership (2025): 110,599
- Ideology: Progressivism; Social democracy
- Political position: Centre-left
- Regional affiliation: Network of Social Democracy in Asia
- International affiliation: Progressive Alliance
- Colours: Orange
- Slogan: มาจากประชาชน เป็นของประชาชน ทำเพื่อประชาชน; ("From the people, of the people, for the people!"); โดยประชาชน เพื่อประชาชน สร้างประเทศไทยที่อำนาจสูงสุดเป็นของประชาชน; ("By the people, for the people! Let's build Thailand where supreme authority belongs to the people!"); ไทยไม่เทา ไทยเท่ากัน ไทยทันโลก; ("Thailand without grey, with equality, kept up with the world!")
- Anthem: "เพลงประชาชน" ('People's Song')
- House of Representatives: 120 / 500
- Bangkok Metropolitan Council: 22 / 50
- PAO Chief Executives: 1 / 76
- PAO Council Members: 136 / 2,316
- Town Municipality Mayors: 5 / 221
- Subdistrict Municipality Mayors: 9 / 2,247

Party flag

Website
- peoplesparty.or.th

The People's Party (PPLE; Thai: พรรคประชาชน, RTGS: Phak Prachachon) is a major progressive and social democratic political party in Thailand. It is the third incarnation of the progressive Future Forward Party, which was founded in 2018 and dissolved by the Constitutional Court on 21 February 2020. It is the successor to the second incarnation, Move Forward Party, which was dissolved by the Constitutional Court on 7 August 2024. It is currently the main opposition party in the House of Representatives and holds the most seats in the Bangkok Metropolitan Council.

The original form of the party was founded in 2012 as the Thinkakhao Party and later as the Thinkakhao Chaovilai Party in 2018, it was renamed into the People's Party, its current form, on 9 August 2024.

== History ==
=== As the Thinkakhao Party and Thinkakhao Chaovilai Party (2012–2024) ===
The party was originally founded as the Thinkakhao Party (Thai: พรรคถิ่นกาขาว) in 2012, later changing its name to the Thinkakhao Chaovilai Party (Thai: พรรคถิ่นกาขาวชาววิไล) in 2018. Before becoming the People's Party, the Thinkakhao Chaovilai Party had 10,474 members in August 2024. Its leadership had Tul Tintamora as party leader and Alisa Sattayawirut as deputy-leader, both assumed their posts on 5 April 2024. During the 2023 general election, 13 candidates were fielded but the party failed to win any seats.

=== As the People's Party (2024–present) ===
Prior to the Thai Constitutional Court's ruling on the fate of the Move Forward Party, it was reported that Thinkakhao Chaovilai had been prepared as a successor party for Move Forward. Move Forward was dissolved by the court on 7 August 2024, which also included five of its MPs being banned from politics. Following the dissolution, all of the remaining 143 MPs joined Thinkakhao Chaovilai. Meetings were then held to elect new party executives, with Natthaphong Ruengpanyawut being elected its new leader and the name was changed to the People's Party (PPLE) on 9 August 2024. The People's Party shares its Thai name with four historical parties, most recently in 1998. Some commentators noted its English name might be an intentional nod to Khana Ratsadon, the group that led the revolution to overthrow absolute monarchy in 1932, whose name is commonly rendered into English as the People's Party.

The party was officially launched on 9 August 2024. On the first day, more than 10 million baht was donated. On the following day, applications for membership were accepted from 10:00 a.m. to 8:00 p.m. at Stadium One, Charoen Phon Intersection. By the end of the day, its membership had grown to almost 40,000 and the total of donations to the party had exceeded 20 million baht.

Soon after the People's Party's formation it was challenged by the conservative royalist Thai Pakdee Party. Warong Dechgitvigrom, leader of the Thai Pakdee, announced on 11 August that he would ask the Election Commission (EC) to conduct an investigation into whether the party should be disqualified due to it having lacked enough branches in the country when it was the Thinkakhao Chaovilai Party. Thai law states that political parties must maintain one branch in each region of Thailand (north, northeast, central plains and south) for one year in order to exist legally. Before becoming the People's Party, it only maintained one branch in the north and two in the central plains. Warong then stated that "for transparency, the EC must check it." On 12 August, the Secretary-General of the EC Sawang Boonmee responded by saying that the People's Party had registered branches in all regions and dismissed Warong's claims. Despite this, Warong said he would submit a petition to the EC and that they "must examine if the Thin Kakao Chaovilai Party had those branches in every region by the time it was taken over."

==== 2025 confidence and supply deal ====
The fall of the Paetongtarn Shinawatra cabinet in the 2025 Thai political crisis led to competition between the Pheu Thai and Bhumjaithai parties to form a new government. The People's Party was not itself able to nominate one of its own members, as the 2017 constitution limits candidates for prime minister to those whose names were submitted by their party prior to the general election. However, being the party with the most seats in the House of Representatives, the People's Party emerged as kingmaker. It declared that it was unwilling to join a government coalition, but would offer confidence and supply on the condition that the new government commits to a referendum on amending the constitution and dissolves parliament within four months. Ultimately a deal was reached with the Bhumjaithai Party, leading to its candidate Anutin Charnvirakul becoming prime minister.

== Political ideology ==
The People's Party has stated that their political ideology is liberty, equality, fraternity. Party leader Nattaphong stated that the party would still pursue amendments to Thailand's lèse-majesté laws, an issue which had landed its predecessor Move Forward in legal trouble.

== Election results ==
=== General elections ===
Prior to its current form as the People's Party, the party contested in the 2019 and 2023 general elections but did not win any seats.

Election	Total seats won	Total votes	Share of votes	Seat change	Outcome of election	Election leader
As Thinkakhao Party
2014	Election nullified (ruled as unconstitutional)					
As Thinkakhao Chaovilai Party
2019	0 / 500	6,799	0.02%	0 seats	No representation in Parliament	Chumchadathan Hannarong
2023	0 / 500	5,534	0.01%	0 seats	No representation in Parliament	Lalita Siripatcharanan
As People's Party
2026	120 / 500	7,864,475	23.55%	▲120 seats ▼31 seats (comparison to Move Forward Party in 2023)	Opposition	Natthaphong Ruengpanyawut
