= Second Anutin cabinet =

Government of Thailand since 2026

- 66th Council of Ministers of Thailand
- 2026–present
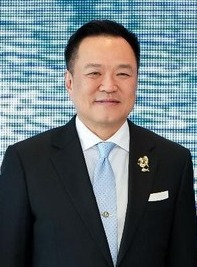
- Date formed: 30 March 2026

People and organisations
- Monarch: Vajiralongkorn
- Prime Minister: Anutin Charnvirakul
- Deputy Prime Minister: Phipat Ratchakitprakarn; Songsak Thongsri; Ekniti Nitithanprapas; Sihasak Phuangketkeow; Suphajee Suthumpun; Pakorn Nilprapunt; Yodchanan Wongsawat
- Member party: Bhumjaithai; Pheu Thai; Palang Pracharath; Prachachart; Economic; Pheu Chart Thai; Thai Sang Thai; United Thai Nation; New; New Alternative; New Democracy; New Dimension; New Opportunity; Ruam Jai Thai; Thai Sub Thawee; People's Power; Confidence and supply Kla Tham (from 2026)
- Status in legislature: Coalition government
- Opposition cabinet: Natthaphong cabinet (De facto)
- Opposition party: People's; Kla Tham (until 2026); Democrat; Thai Ruam Palang; Thai Liberal; Thai Pakdee
- Opposition leader: Natthaphong Ruengpanyawut

History
- Election: 2026 general election
- Legislature term: HoR 27th: 2026–present
- Predecessor: First Anutin cabinet

The Second Anutin cabinet, formally known as the 66th Council of Ministers, (Note: Thai: คณะรัฐมนตรีไทย คณะที่ 66) was formed after the 2026 Thai General Election. The coalition is led by the Bhumjaithai Party, which nominated Anutin Charnvirakul as its candidate for prime minister.

== History ==
Anutin was elected by House of Representatives as prime minister on 19 March 2026 and received the appointment from the royal command the same day.

The cabinet was officially sworn into office by King Rama X on 6 April 2026.

== Election of the prime minister ==
19 March 2026; Nomination of Anutin Charnvirakul (PTP) and Natthaphong Ruengpanyawut (PPLE) as Prime Minister; Absolute majority: 250/499
Vote	Parties	Votes
Anutin Charnvirakul	Bhumjaithai (187), Pheu Thai (73), Thai Ruam Palang (6), Prachachat (5), Palang Pracharath (5), Economic (3), Pheu Chart Thai (2), United Thai Nation (2), Thai Sang Thai (1), New (1), New Alternative (1), New Democracy (1), New Dimension (1), New Opportunity (1), Ruam Jai Thai (1), Thai Sub Thawee (1), United People's Power (1), People's (1)	293 / 499
Natthaphong Ruengpanyawut	People's (118), Thai Liberal (1)	119 / 499
Abstain	Kla Tham (58), Democrat (21), Bhumjaithai (3), People's (1), Pheu Thai (1), Thai Sang Thai (1), Thai Pakdee (1)	86 / 499
Not voting	Bhumjaithai (1)	1 / 499

== List of ministers ==
Portfolio	Order	Minister	Took office	Left office	Party
Prime Minister	–	Anutin Charnvirakul	19 March 2026	Incumbent	Bhumjaithai
Deputy Prime Ministers	1	Phipat Ratchakitprakarn	30 March 2026	Incumbent	Bhumjaithai
Deputy Prime Ministers	2	Songsak Thongsri	30 March 2026	Incumbent	Bhumjaithai
Deputy Prime Ministers	3	Ekniti Nitithanprapas	30 March 2026	Incumbent	Bhumjaithai
Deputy Prime Ministers	4	Sihasak Phuangketkeow	30 March 2026	Incumbent	Bhumjaithai
Deputy Prime Ministers	5	Suphajee Suthumpun	30 March 2026	Incumbent	Bhumjaithai
Deputy Prime Ministers	6	Pakorn Nilprapunt	30 March 2026	Incumbent	Independent
Deputy Prime Ministers	7	Yodchanan Wongsawat	30 March 2026	Incumbent	Pheu Thai
Office of the Prime Minister	8	Supamas Isarabhakdi	30 March 2026	Incumbent	Bhumjaithai
Office of the Prime Minister	9	Napinthorn Srisanpang	30 March 2026	Incumbent	Bhumjaithai
Office of the Prime Minister	10	Paradorn Prissananantakul	30 March 2026	Incumbent	Bhumjaithai
Office of the Prime Minister	11	Suksomruay Wantaneeakul	30 March 2026	Incumbent	Bhumjaithai
Minister of Defence	12	Adul Boonthamcharoen	30 March 2026	Incumbent	Independent
Minister of Finance	*	Ekniti Nitithanprapas	30 March 2026	Incumbent	Bhumjaithai
Minister of Foreign Affairs	*	Sihasak Phuangketkeow	30 March 2026	Incumbent	Bhumjaithai
Minister of Tourism and Sports	13	Surasak Phancharoenworakul	30 March 2026	Incumbent	Bhumjaithai
Minister of Social Development and Human Security	14	Nikorn Soemklang	30 March 2026	Incumbent	Pheu Thai
Minister of Higher Education, Science, Research and Innovation	*	Yodchanan Wongsawat	30 March 2026	Incumbent	Pheu Thai
Minister of Agriculture and Cooperatives	15	Suriya Juangroongruangkit	30 March 2026	Incumbent	Pheu Thai
Deputy Ministers of Agriculture and Cooperatives	16	Watcharaphol Khawkhum	30 March 2026	Incumbent	Pheu Thai
Deputy Ministers of Agriculture and Cooperatives	17	Piyarat Tiyapairat	30 March 2026	Incumbent	Pheu Thai
Minister of Transport	*	Phipat Ratchakitprakarn	30 March 2026	Incumbent	Bhumjaithai
Deputy Ministers of Transport	18	Siripong Angkasakulkiat	30 March 2026	Incumbent	Bhumjaithai
Deputy Ministers of Transport	19	Phattharaphong Phattharaprasit	30 March 2026	Incumbent	Bhumjaithai
Deputy Ministers of Transport	20	Sanphet Boonyamanee	30 March 2026	Incumbent	Bhumjaithai
Minister of Digital Economy and Society	21	Chaichanok Chidchob	30 March 2026	Incumbent	Bhumjaithai
Deputy Minister of Digital Economy and Society	22	Boonyathida Somchai	30 March 2026	Incumbent	Bhumjaithai
Minister of Natural Resources and Environment	23	Suchart Chomklin	30 March 2026	Incumbent	Bhumjaithai
Minister of Energy	24	Akanat Promphan	30 March 2026	Incumbent	Bhumjaithai
Minister of Commerce	*	Suphajee Suthumpun	30 March 2026	Incumbent	Bhumjaithai
Minister of Interior	*	Anutin Charnvirakul	30 March 2026	Incumbent	Bhumjaithai
Deputy Ministers of Interior	25	Polapee Suwanchawee	30 March 2026	Incumbent	Bhumjaithai
Deputy Ministers of Interior	26	Jeseth Thaiseth	30 March 2026	Incumbent	Bhumjaithai
Deputy Ministers of Interior	27	Vorasit Liangprasit	30 March 2026	Incumbent	Bhumjaithai
Minister of Justice	28	Rutthaphon Naowarat	30 March 2026	Incumbent	Bhumjaithai
Minister of Labour	29	Julapun Amornvivat	30 March 2026	Incumbent	Pheu Thai
Minister of Culture	30	Sabida Thaiseth	30 March 2026	Incumbent	Bhumjaithai
Minister of Education	31	Prasert Jantararuangtong	30 March 2026	Incumbent	Pheu Thai
Deputy Minister of Education	32	Akkharanan Kannakittinan	30 March 2026	Incumbent	Pheu Thai
Minister of Public Health	33	Pattana Promphat	30 March 2026	Incumbent	Bhumjaithai
Minister of Industry	34	Varawut Silpa-archa	30 March 2026	Incumbent	Bhumjaithai
