= 2026 Thai general election =

Parliamentary election held in Thailand

- 8 February 2026

All 500 seats in the House of Representatives 251 seats needed for a majority
- Registered: 52,933,610 (▲1.33%)
- Turnout: 71.42% (▼4.22 pp)
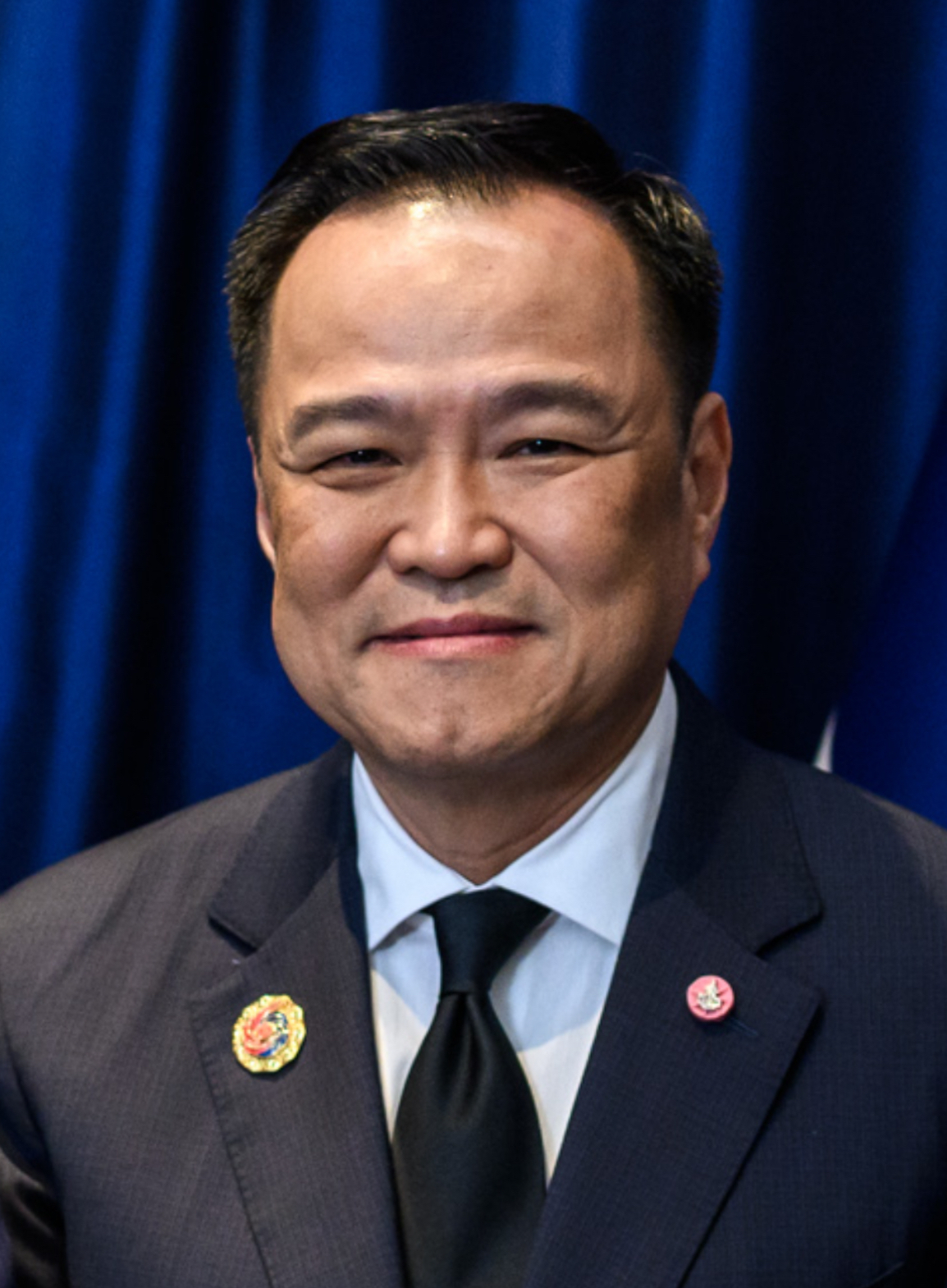

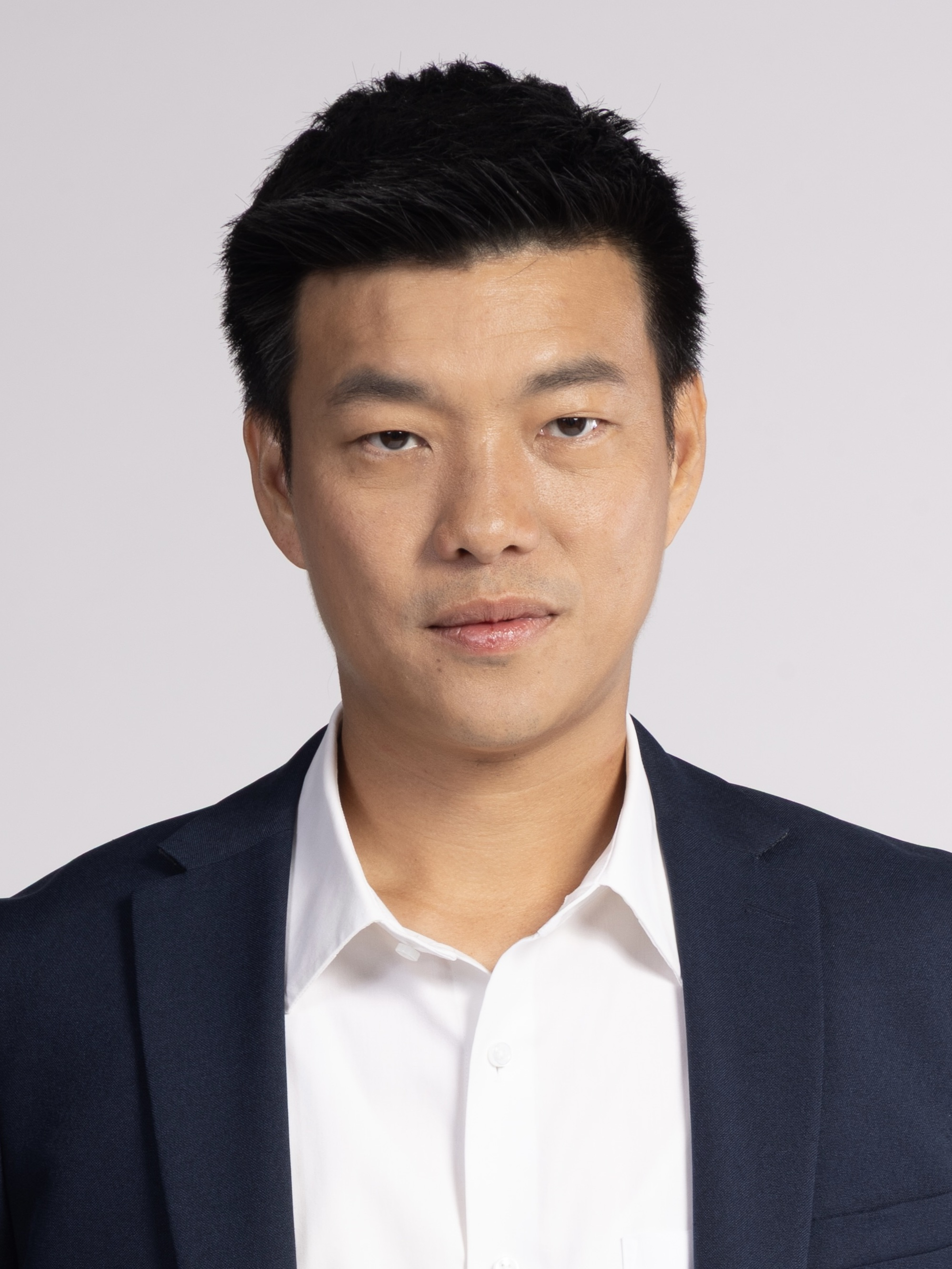

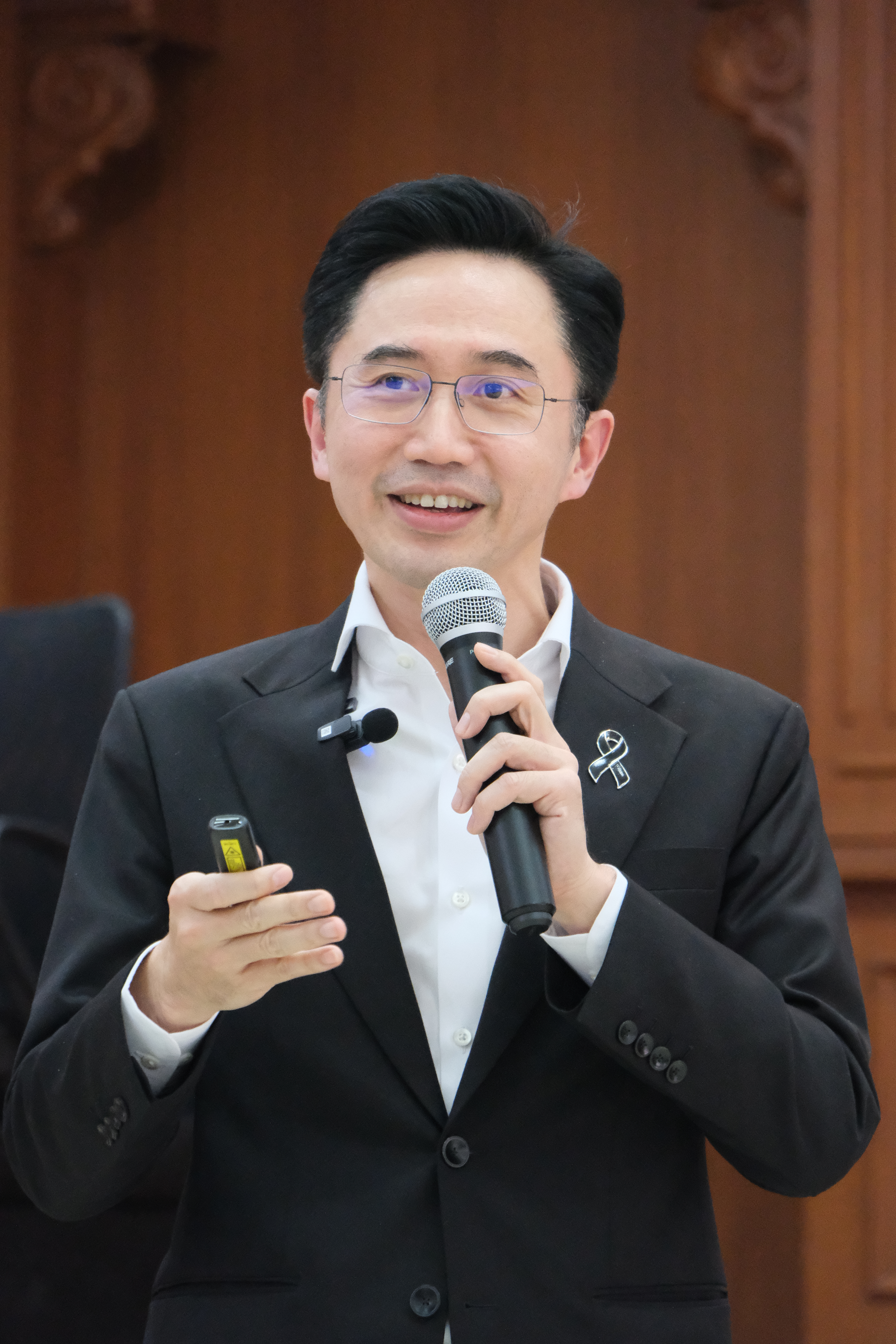

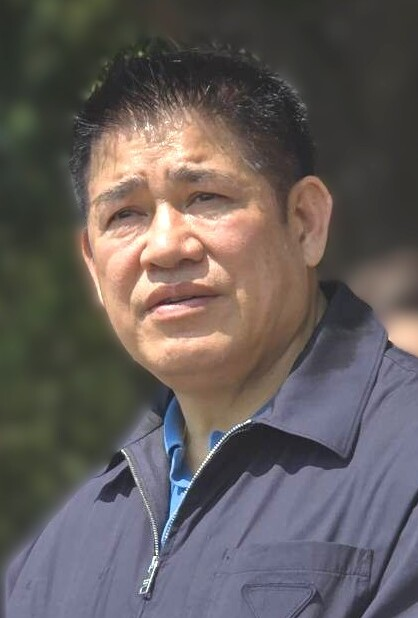

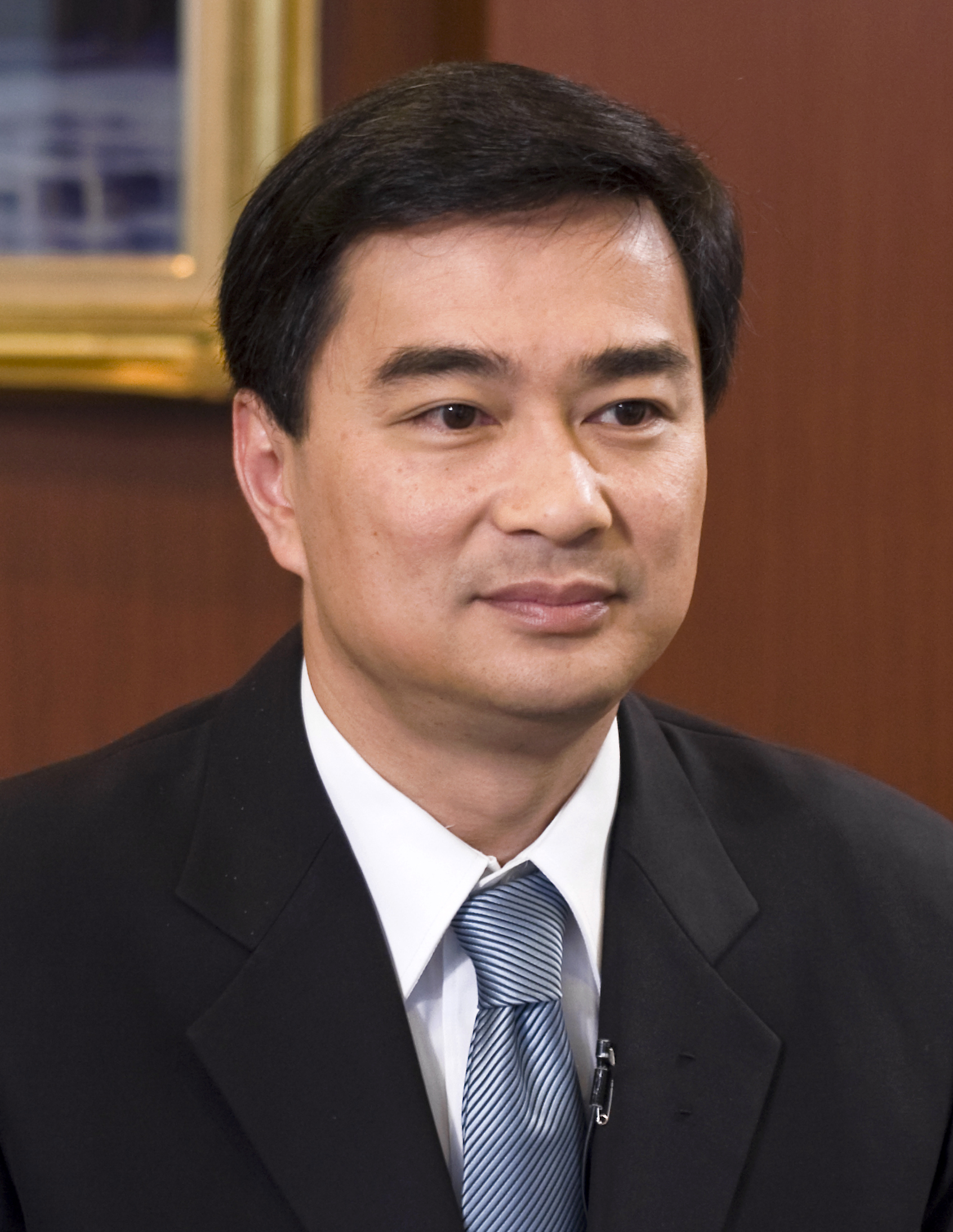
	First party	Second party	Third party
Candidate	Anutin Charnvirakul (Note: The Prime Ministerial candidates for the Bhumjaithai Party are Anutin Chanrnvirakul and Sihasak Phuangketkeow, however Anutin Chanrnvirakul is the lead candidate for Prime Minister.)	Natthaphong Ruengpanyawut (Note: The Prime Ministerial candidates for the People's Party are Natthaphong Ruengpanyawut, Sirikanya Tansakun and Veerayooth Kanchoochat, however Natthaphong Ruengpanyawut is the lead candidate for Prime Minister.)	Yodchanan Wongsawat (Note: The Prime Ministerial candidates for the Pheu Thai Party are Yodchanan Wongsawat, Julapun Amornvivat and Suriya Juangroongruangkit, however Yodchanan Wongsawat is the lead candidate for Prime Minister.)
Party	Bhumjaithai	People's	Pheu Thai
Last election	71 seats	151 seats (Note: As the Move Forward Party)	141 seats
Seats won	192	120	74
Seat change	▲121	▼31	▼67
Constituency vote	10,776,164	8,868,301	6,263,994
% and swing	29.55% (▲16.06 pp)	24.32% (▼1.08 pp)	17.18% (▼7.36 pp)
Party-list vote	6,468,073	11,043,309	5,575,456
% and swing	17.90% (▲14.91 pp)	30.56% (▼7.43 pp)	15.43% (▼13.41 pp)
	Fourth party	Fifth party
Candidate	Thamanat Prompow	Abhisit Vejjajiva (Note: The Prime Ministerial candidates for the Democrat Party are Abhisit Vejjajiva, Korn Chatikavanij and Karndee Leopairote, however Abhisit Vejjajiva is the lead candidate for Prime Minister.)
Party	Kla Tham	Democrat
Last election	New	25 seats
Seats won	58	21
Seat change	New	▼4
Constituency vote	4,112,457	2,186,565
% and swing	11.28% (New)	6.00% (▲0.01 pp)
Party-list vote	648,662	3,941,928
% and swing	1.79% (New)	10.91% (▲8.46 pp)
- Results by constituency
Prime Minister before election
Anutin Charnvirakul
Bhumjaithai
Prime Minister-designate
Anutin Charnvirakul
Bhumjaithai

General elections were held in Thailand on 8 February 2026 in order to determine the composition of the House of Representatives. A referendum was also held on the same day so as to determine whether the 2017 constitution should be replaced with a new one.

After the 2023 general election, three coalition governments were formed by the resulting parliament. After an initial attempt by the progressive Move Forward Party was blocked by the Senate, the Pheu Thai Party split off to form governments with conservative and pro-military parties, first under Srettha Thavisin and later under Paetongtarn Shinawatra. Both governments collapsed, with Srettha removed by a court ruling in 2024 and Paetongtarn dismissed by the Constitutional Court in 2025.

In September 2025, an agreement was made between the People's Party and Bhumjaithai Party to support Anutin Charnvirakul as prime minister, with a requirement for Anutin to dissolve the House within 4 months after the presentation of the government's policy platform. The House was dissolved on 12 December 2025, with a snap election being required within 60 days. The election was scheduled for 8 February 2026, the latest possible date.

The election resulted in the Bhumjaithai Party winning the most seats in the House of Representatives, with 192. The People's Party, led by Natthaphong Ruengpanyawut, followed in second place with 120 seats. Pheu Thai, led by Yodchanan Wongsawat, came in third with 74 seats. There was a drop in turnout, which was 4.22 percentage points down compared to the last election.

The election was a rare victory for conservatism and nationalism in Thailand, marking its first victory in the 21st century. Bhumjaithai was seen as benefiting from nationalist sentiments after Thailand's recent clash with Cambodia. While the other two major parties performed respectably, they ultimately fragmented the centrist and progressive vote. Anutin formed a coalition government with Pheu Thai and was re-elected prime minister on 19 March 2026. The conduct of the election remained subject to legal challenge, with the Constitutional Court due to rule in September 2026 on whether codes printed on the ballots breached the constitutional guarantee of voting secrecy.

== Background ==
=== Previous election ===
The previous election in 2023 saw a shift towards progressive parties, with the Move Forward Party winning 151 seats followed by the Thaksin Shinawatra-aligned Pheu Thai Party. The governing coalition of conservative parties only won 15% of the seats, with the Bhumjaithai Party being the only one to increase their numbers. Move Forward initially formed an eight party coalition with Pheu Thai, Thai Sang Thai, Prachachat, Thai Liberal, New Social Power, Thai Ruam Palang and the Fair Party. The coalition had a total of 313 MPs, giving them a majority in the House of Representatives. However, under the transitory provisions of the 2017 constitution, the prime minister was to be chosen by both elected MPs and NCPO-appointed Senators. As such, Move Forward leader Pita Limjaroenrat failed to gain enough votes to become prime minister. The opportunity to form government passed to Pheu Thai who formed a coalition excluding Move Forward that included conservative parties such as Bhumjaithai, and the military-backed Palang Pracharath and United Thai Nation parties. Their candidate, Srettha Thavisin, was elected prime minister on 22 August with the support of most Senators.

The 2026 election was the third election under the 2017 constitution, which was implemented under Prime Minister Prayut Chan-o-cha and the National Council for Peace and Order (NCPO) and the first after the expiration of the constitution's five-year transitory provision that gave the Senate voting rights to choose the prime minister in a joint session of parliament. As such, unlike in 2023 when the junta-appointed Senate (whose term also ends after five years) blocked the election's winner from forming government, this time the outcome of the election should determine the resulting government.

=== Composition of Parliament ===
Composition of the House when it was dissolved on 12 December 2025.

On 3 August 2023, Move Forward MP Nakhonchai Khunnarong resigned over his criminal record, but Move Forward held Rayong 3rd district after Phongsathorn Sornpetchnarin won the by-election. On 28 September, Move Forward MP for Phitsanulok 1st district Padipat Suntiphada left the party to retain his position as First Deputy Speaker of the House of Representatives, which the opposition party is barred from holding. As sitting MPs are required to be members of political parties, Padipat joined the Fair Party on 31 October increasing that party's total seats to two. In November 2023, amid a sexual assault scandal, Move Forward expelled two MPs: Wuttiphong Thonglour of Prachinburi on 1 November and Chaiyamparwaan Munphianchit of Bangkok on 7 November. By the end of November, Chaiyamparwaan joined the Thai Progress Party as its only MP whilst Wuttiphong joined the Chart Pattana Party and increased its number of MPs to three. On 30 August 2023, the sole MP and leader of the Thai Liberal Party, Sereepisuth Temeeyaves, resigned his seat and was replaced by Mangkorn Yontrakul also from the Thai Liberal.

On 7 August 2024, Move Forward was dissolved by the Constitutional Court over the party's campaign to amend Thailand's lèse-majesté laws. The dissolution accompanied five sitting party-list MPs receiving 10-year bans from politics: Pita Limjaroenrat, Chaithawat Tulathon, Apichart Sirisunthon, Bencha Saengchantra and Suthep U-on. As party-list seats, no by-elections were held and the five seats remained vacant. The remaining 143 MPs joined the Thinkakhao Chaovilai Party, who held no seats, and the party was renamed to the People's Party on 9 August. Additionally, Padipat also received a 10-year ban and the Fair Party dropped to one MP. Phitsanulok 1st district was won by Pheu Thai candidate Jadet Jantar on 15 September, defeating the People's Party who won the seat as Move Forward in 2023.

On 5 October 2024, party-list and sole MP for the New Party Kritdithat Sangthanyothin was expelled from the party. The following day, New Social Power's sole MP Chao Writthit Kachornpongkitti of Nan 1st district was also expelled. Buncha Dechjerongsirikul, party-list MP and leader of the Party of Thai Counties, left the party on 15 October. Preeda Boonpleng, sole MP of the Thai Teachers for People Party, was expelled on 21 October. All four MPs joined the Kla Tham Party by the end of October, increasing Kla Tham's number of seats to four. On 11 December 2024, Thamanat Prompow and his faction of 19 other MPs were expelled by the Palang Pracharath Party and officially joined Kla Tham on 19 December, boosting Kla Tham to 24 seats and making it a medium size party. In 2025, Kla Tham saw further defections to it. On 18 April 2025, Ekarat Changlao of Khon Kaen was expelled by Bhumjaithai amid a embezzlement scandal and joined Kla Tham.

On 27 April 2025, Bhumjaithai lost a seat when Kla Tham candidate Kongkiat Katesombat won a by-election in Nakhon Si Thammarat 8th district after Bhumjaithai MP Mukdawan Loengseenil was disqualified for electoral fraud. Pichet Chuamuangpan of Pheu Thai was disqualified by the Constitutional Court for misusing funds on 1 August. His seat, Chiang Rai 7th district, continued to be held by Pheu Thai after Sa-nga Prommuang won the by-election on 14 September. On 28 September, Bhumjaithai candidate Chintawan Traisaranakul won Sisaket 5th district from Pheu Thai following the death of MP Amornthep Sommai in June 2025. Bhumjaithai won another seat from Pheu Thai in the by-election for Kanchanaburi 4th district on 19 October. Wisuda Vicheansil won the seat following the resignation of his father Sakda Vicheansil to join Bhumjaithai. On 7 September, Pheu Thai party-list MP Noppadon Pattama resigned.

=== Events of the 26th Parliament ===
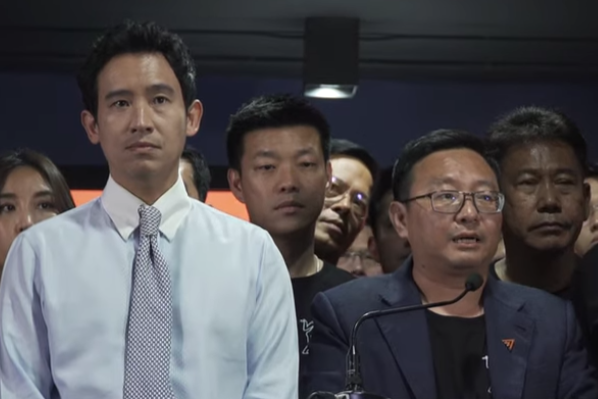
Move Forward press conference after its dissolution in 2024.

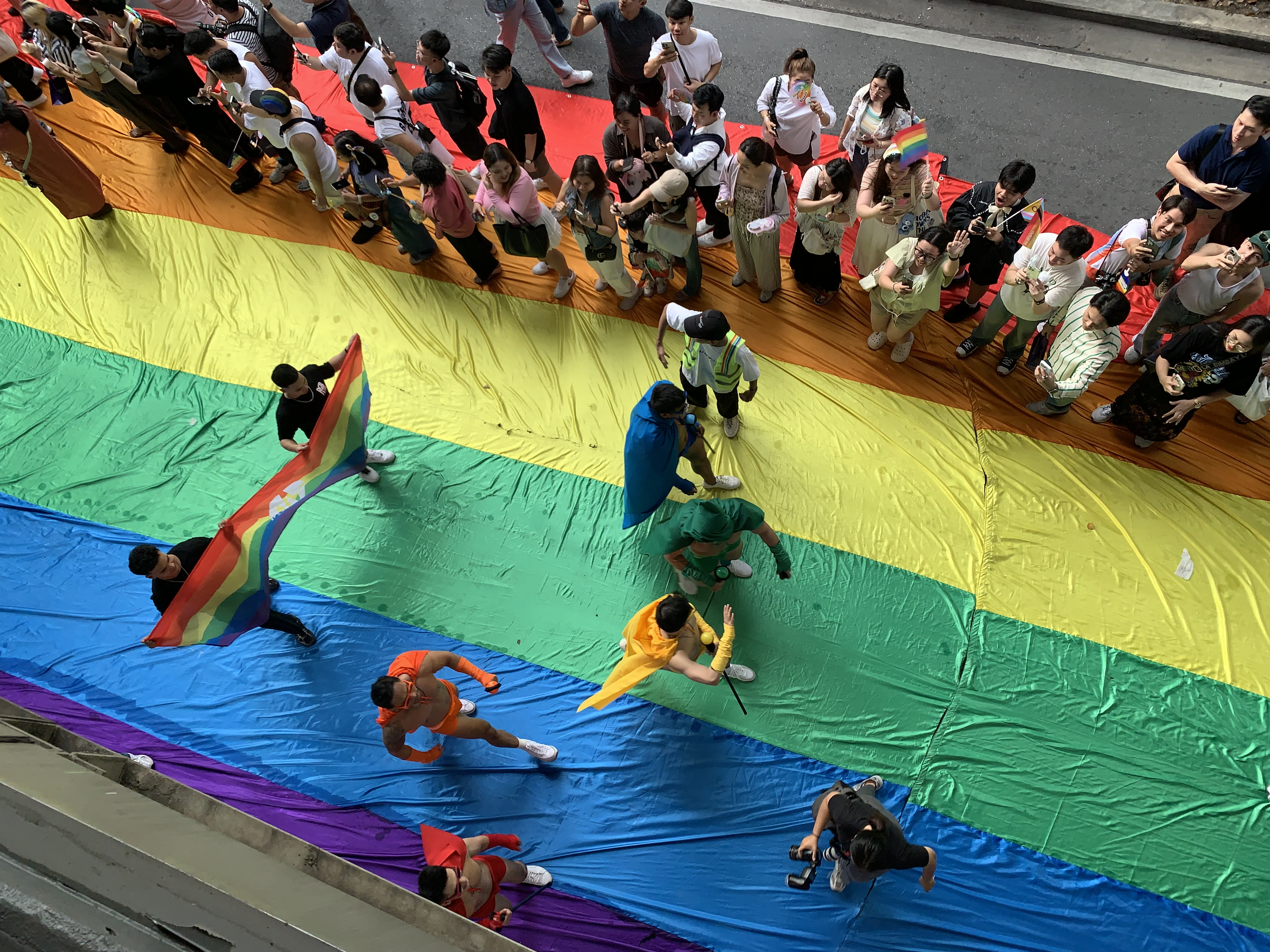
Same-sex marriage became legal in Thailand in 2025.

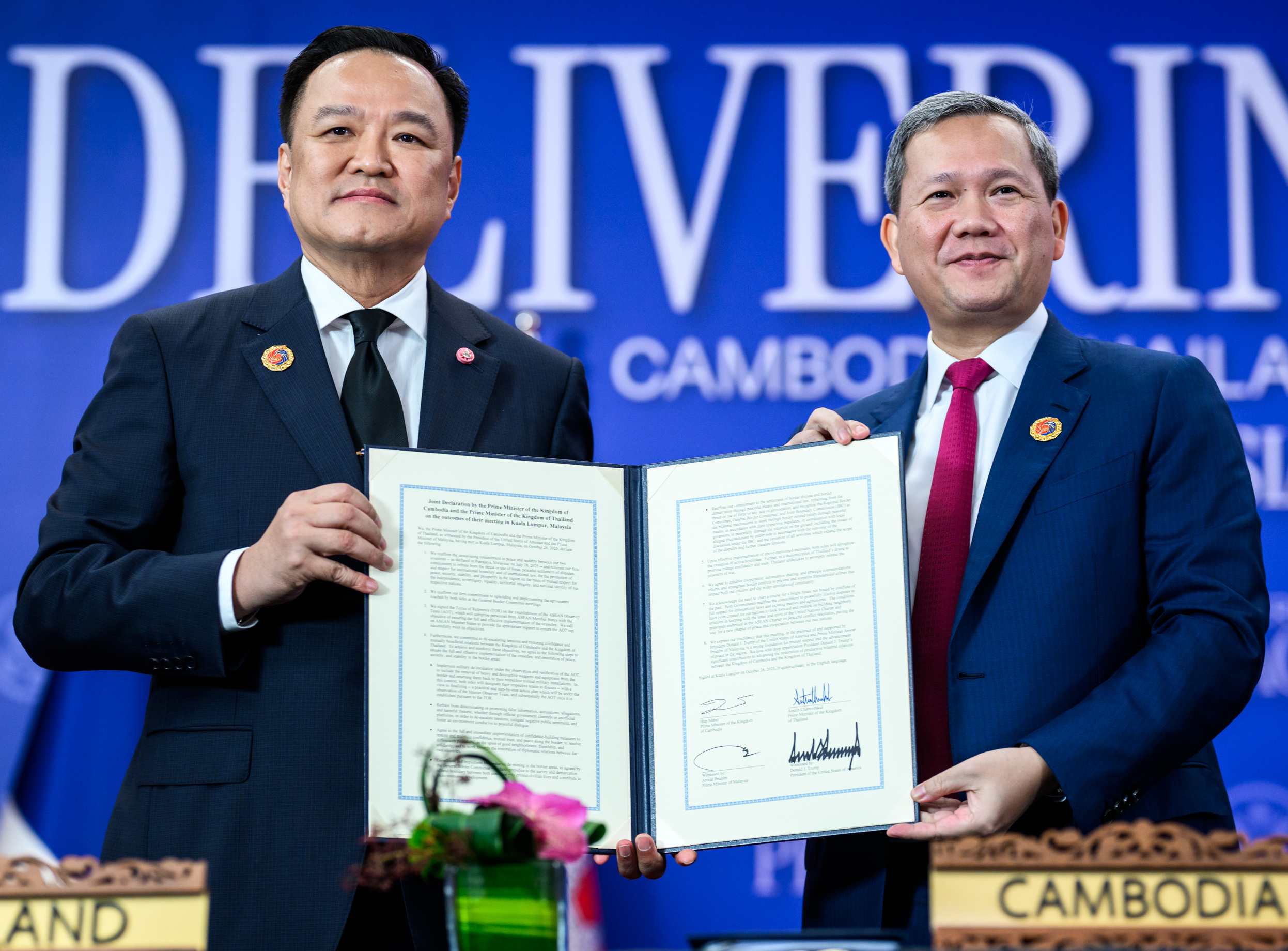
Anutin with Hun Manet signing the Kuala Lumpur Peace Accord

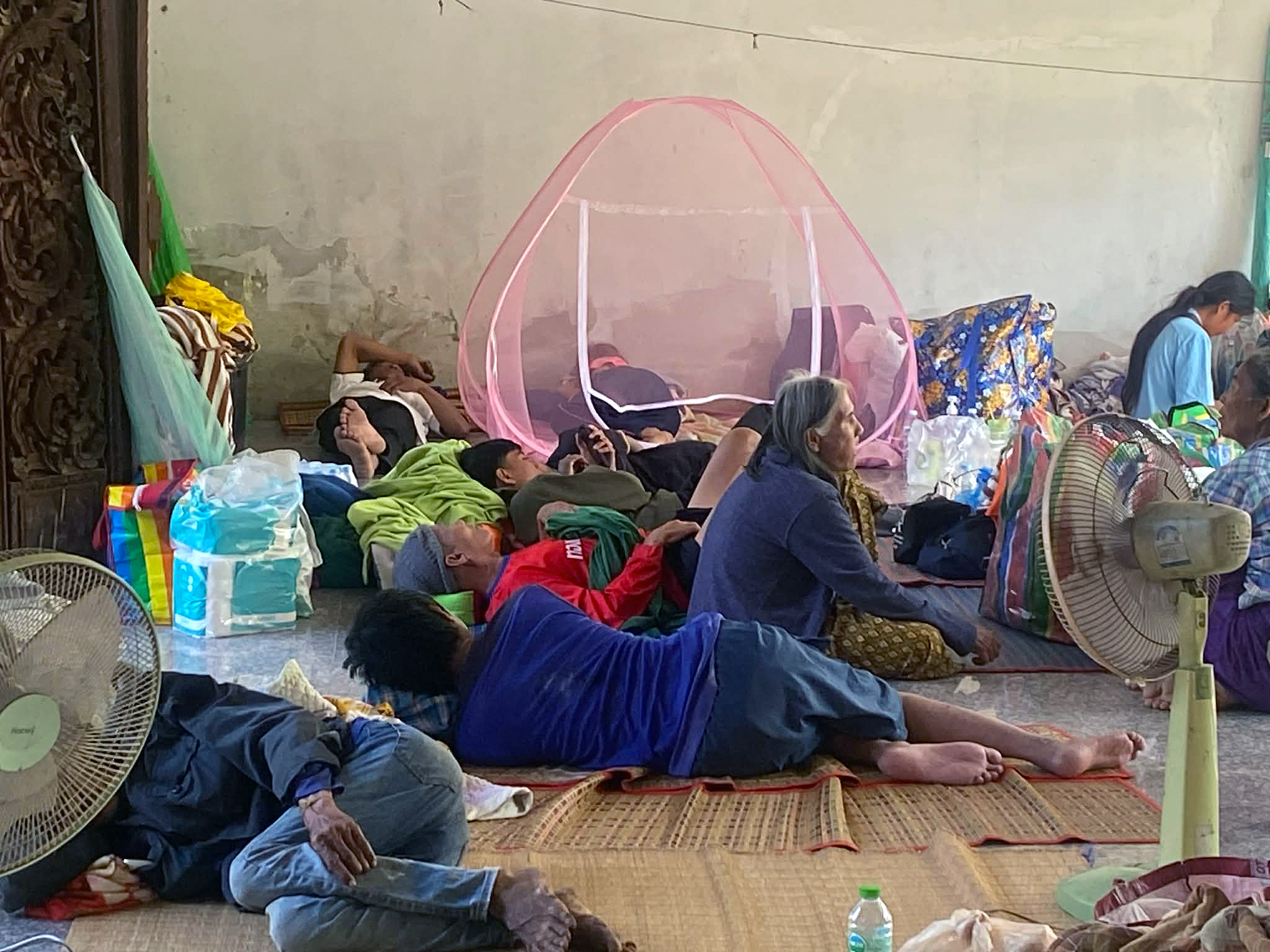
Civilians displaced by border clashes with Cambodia, 2025.

Between the 2023 and 2026 elections, Thailand had three prime ministers from two parties succeed each other. Srettha Thavisin lasted 358 days but was dismissed by the Constitutional Court on 14 August 2024 over his appointment of Pichit Chuenban to his cabinet. He was succeeded by Paetongtarn Shinawatra from Pheu Thai who was prime minister for little over a year but was suspended on 1 July 2025. Following a skirmish between Thai and Cambodian soldiers on 28 May 2025, a border crisis and conflict ensued between the two countries leading to a political crisis. A controversial phone call held between Paetongtarn and Cambodian Senate President Hun Sen was leaked in June, leading to the withdrawal of Bhumjaithai from the coalition and her suspension as PM. The Constitutional Court removed her as prime minister on 29 August. Paetongtarn is the daughter of former prime minister Thaksin Shinawatra who returned to Thailand in 2023 after 15-years in exile on the same day Srettha became prime minister. Controversially, Thaksin did not spend a complete day in prison as he was transferred to the Police General Hospital; he was later released on parole on 13 January 2024. During both Srettha and Paetongtarn's premierships, Thaksin was routinely accused of being the 'power behind the throne'. On 9 September 2025, in the 14th floor case, Thaksin was sentenced to a year in prison by the Supreme Court.

Following the removal of Paetongtarn, both Pheu Thai and Bhumjaithai sought the support of the People's Party to back their candidates. The People's Party formally confirmed its support for Bhumjaithai leader Anutin Charnvirakul to become prime minister. The agreement between the two parties was on the condition that Anutin dissolve the House within four months, Bhumjaithai must maintain a minority coalition, and must also initiate the process of amending the 2017 constitution and hold a referendum if required. Acting prime minister Phumtham Wechayachai's attempt to dissolve the House was rejected over concerns about whether an acting prime minister had the powers to do so. Anutin was elected prime minister on 5 September 2025 and was formally sworn two days later. In the three months prior to the early dissolution, he signed the Kuala Lumpur Peace Accord on 26 October, which led to an uneasy and unstable peace agreement until military engagements and re-escalation restarted on 7 December. His government was criticised for its response to online scam networks, and severe flooding in Songkhla province in the wake of Cyclone Senyar and a controversial 2025 SEA Games made negative reception. Amid rumours of an early dissolution, the House was formally dissolved on 12 December before a vote of no-confidence by the People's Party could go through.

== Electoral system ==
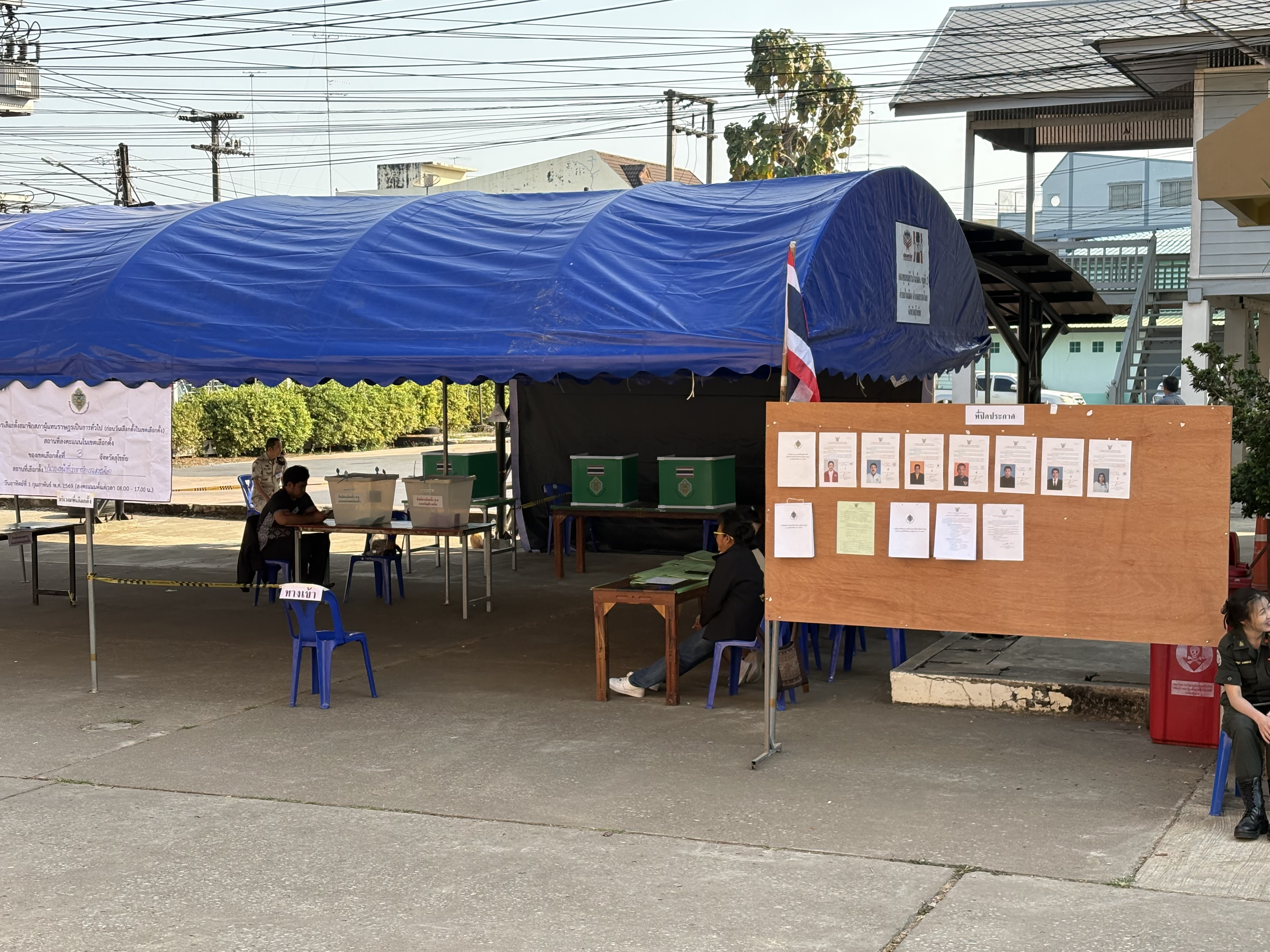
A polling station in Sawankhalok, Sukhothai during early voting date of 1 February 2026

As in the 2023 election, the electoral system followed that of the 2021 amendment of the 2017 constitution. The 500 members of the House of Representatives were elected by parallel voting. 400 seats were elected from single-member constituencies by first-past-the-post voting and 100 seats by proportional representation. Voters cast separate ballots for the two sets of seats.

The 100 party-list seats were distributed under the "100 divisor" formula, restored in 2022 after parliament failed to finalise a rival draft within its 180-day deadline. The national party-list vote is divided by 100 to give a quota; each party takes one seat for every whole quota it has won, and the seats still unfilled go to the parties with the largest fractional remainders. List seats are awarded on top of constituency seats rather than in compensation for them, so a party that sweeps the constituencies keeps its full proportional entitlement as well. Writing shortly before the system was first used, Napon Jatusripitak of the ISEAS–Yusof Ishak Institute observed that cutting the number of list seats from 150 to 100 raised the share of the vote needed to win one and allowed larger parties to take a higher proportion of seats than of votes. At the 2026 election the 35,030,579 valid party-list votes produced a quota of 350,306.

=== Prime ministerial candidates ===
Under the 2017 constitution, prime ministers may only be chosen from a pre-declared list of candidates. Each party may submit up to three names and must have at least 5% (25 members) in the House of Representatives to receive eligibility. Candidates did not have to be a member of parliament (MP).

Bhumjaithai Party		People's Party		
Anutin Chanrnvirakul	Sihasak Phuangketkeow	Natthaphong Ruengpanyawut	Sirikanya Tansakun	Veerayooth Kanchoochat
Prime Minister (since 2025)	Minister of Foreign Affairs (since 2025)	Leader of the Opposition (2024–2025)	Deputy Leader of the People's Party (since 2024)	Deputy Leader of the People's Party (since 2024)

Pheu Thai Party			Kla Tham Party
Yodchanan Wongsawat	Julapun Amornvivat	Suriya Juangroongruangkit	Thamanat Prompow
Vice president of research at Mahidol University (since 2025)	Leader of the Pheu Thai Party (Since 2025)	Deputy Prime Minister (2024–2025)	Deputy Prime Minister (since 2025)

== Campaign ==
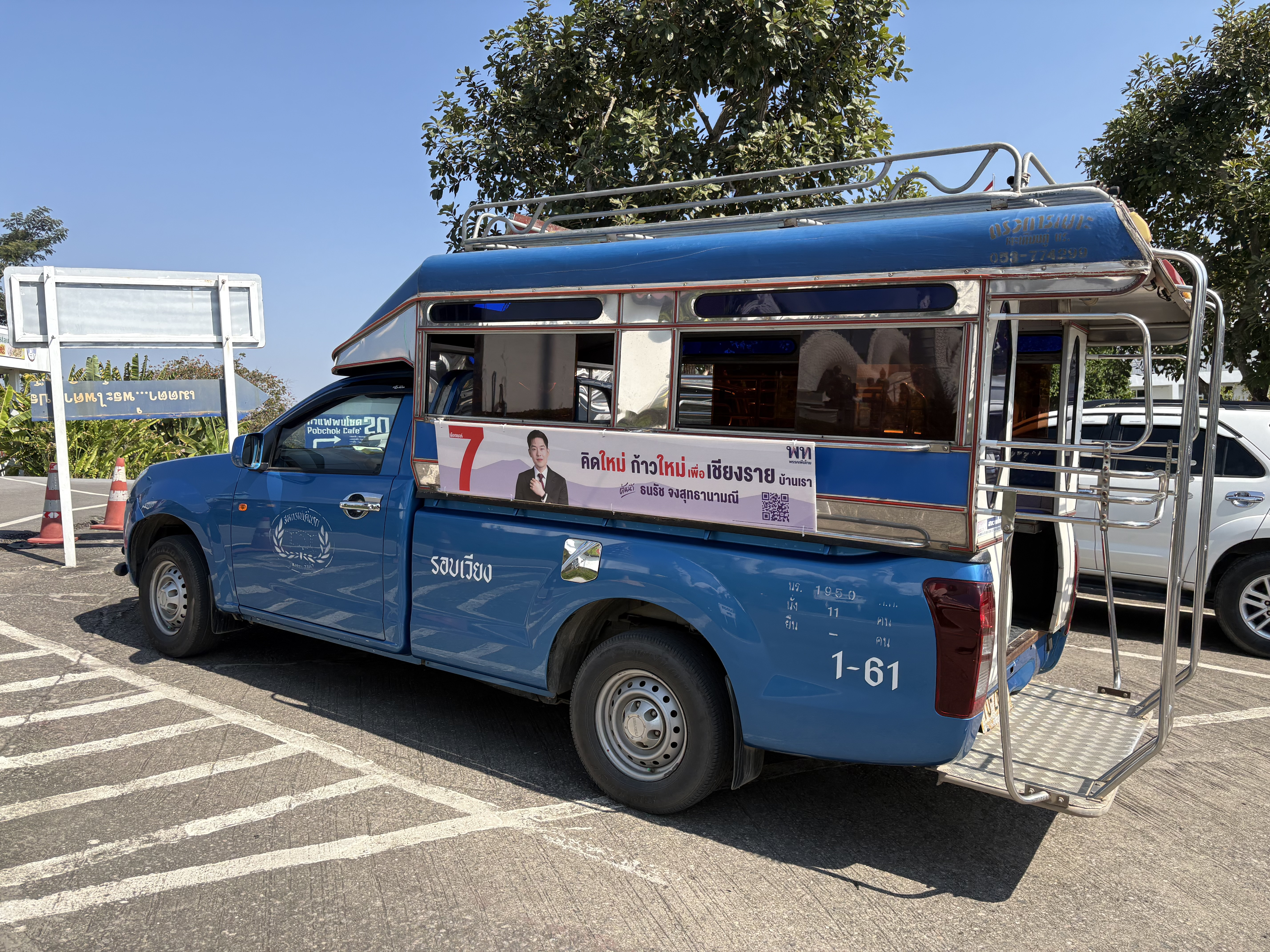
A campaign billboard on a songthaew in Chiang Rai, January 2026.

On 12 December, Prime Minister Anutin Charnvirakul submitted a draft royal decree to King Vajiralongkorn to dissolve the House of Representatives. On the same day, the Royal Gazette published a royal decree dissolving the House. A general election must be held between 45 and 60 days from the House's dissolution, setting 8 February 2026 as the latest date to hold an election. On 15 December, the Election Commission announced that the general election would be held on 8 February 2026, with the official results to be announced on 9 April, whereupon the new House will convene to elect a new prime minister and parliamentary speakers within 15 days.

On 16 December, the Pheu Thai Party announced its three candidates for prime minister: Yodchanan Wongsawat, party leader Julapun Amornvivat, and Suriya Juangroongruangkit. On 20 December, the Election Commission opened registration for advance voting, which will last until 5 January 2026. On the first day of registration, 98,900 voters had already registered. On 22 December, the Democrat Party officially began its election campaign with the slogan "Thailand Out of Poverty". The launch coincided with the presentation of 33 Democrat candidates contesting every Bangkok constituency. The Thai Sang Thai Party pledged to introduce three flagship anti-corruption measures if elected.

On 23 December, the Kla Tham Party announced incumbent deputy prime minister Thamanat Prompow as its sole prime ministerial candidate. On 24 December, Bhumjaithai backtracked on previous announcements by declaring Anutin as its sole candidate for prime minister. The following day, Foreign Minister Sihasak Phuangketkeow was named as Bhumjaithai's second candidate for prime minister as a backup. On 25 December, Pheu Thai announced its list of 500 candidates to contest every House seat. Anutin ruled out any coalition between Bhumjaithai and parties seeking to amend Article 112 on lèse-majesté following statements by Natthaphong that the People's Party would never vote for Anutin to become prime minister again.

On 26 December, the Democrat Party announced its three candidates for prime minister: party leader Abhisit Vejjajiva, Korn Chatikavanij, and Karndee Leopairote, at its headquarters in Bangkok. Palang Pracharath Party leader Prawit Wongsuwon announced his intention to retire from politics after withdrawing as one of the party's three prime ministerial candidates. His withdrawal as a prime ministerial candidate was joined by deputy party leader Thirachai Phuvanatnaranubala, who also announced his withdrawal from politics. On 28 December, representatives from 52 political parties registered their parties' lists of prime ministerial and party-list candidates.

== Contesting parties ==
Sixty parties won votes at the election, of which twenty-one secured seats.

A total of 57 political parties registered party lists. The first 52 party numbers were selected by lottery, and the last five were selected chronologically. Registration closed on 1 January 2026 with more than 5,000 constituency and party-list candidates and 94 prime ministerial candidates on the books.

Contesting parties
#	Name	Candidates
1	Thai Subthawee Party	3
2	Pheu Chart Thai Party	6
3	New Party	41
4	New Dimension Party	12
5	Ruam Jai Thai Party	12
6	United Thai Nation Party	100
7	Movement Party	24
8	New Democracy Party	21
9	Pheu Thai Party	100
10	New Alternative Party	20
11	Economic Party	63
12	Thai Liberal Party	43
13	People's Power Party	10
14	Party of Thai Counties	14
15	Thailand's Future Party	1
16	Power Thai Party	4
17	Thaichana Party	28
18	Plung Sungkom Mai Party	4
19	Thai Social Democratic Party	8
20	Fusion Party	13
21	Thai Ruam Palang Party	15
22	Independent Party	15
23	Thai People's Party	41
24	Vision Mai Party	28
25	Phue Cheevit Mai Party	4
26	Klong Thai Party	16
27	Democrat Party	98
28	Thai Progress Party	14
29	Thai Pakdee Party	24
30	Nation Building Labour Party	16
31	Thai Citizen Party	18
32	Thai Teachers for People Party	22
33	Prachachat Party	37
34	Futurise Thailand Party	10
35	Rak Chart Party	25
36	Thai Prompt Party	10
37	Bhumjaithai Party	98
38	New Palangdharma Party	5
39	Green Party	12
40	Thai Morality Party	8
41	Land of Dharma Party	9
42	Kla Tham Party	100
43	Palang Pracharath Party	35
44	New Opportunity Party	33
45	Fair Party	23
46	People's Party	99
47	Thai Population Party	9
48	Thai Sang Thai Party	79
49	Thai Kao Mai Party	60
50	Thai Nation's People Volunteer Party	3
51	Promp Party	9
52	Farmer Network of Thailand Party	6
53	Thai Pitak Tham Party	10
54	New Aspiration Party	8
55	Thai Ruam Thai Party	4
56	Party for the Country	44
57	Palang Thai Rak Chart Party	2

== Referendum ==
Alongside the general election, voters were asked to participate in a referendum regarding a proposed rewrite of the country's 2017 Constitution.

On election night, unofficial results reported by Al Jazeera indicated that more than 57 per cent of voters had supported the drafting of a new constitution. People's Party leader Natthaphong Ruengpanyawut acknowledged that the referendum appeared to have been approved and stated his party would respect the parliamentary process. The proposal was carried. According to the Election Commission, 21,621,638 voters (60.16 per cent) approved the drafting of a new constitution, 11,241,653 (31.28 per cent) rejected it and 3,074,330 (8.55 per cent) expressed no opinion, from 35,937,621 valid ballots. A further 932,583 ballots were rejected as invalid. Turnout in the referendum was 36,870,266, or 69.65 per cent, about 937,000 fewer ballots than were cast in the general election held the same day. Support was broadly spread, with 288 of the 400 constituencies recording a 'yes' vote above 70 per cent and only 38 recording a 'no' vote above 50 per cent, two of them in Buriram and the remaining 36 in the upper south.

== Opinion polls ==
Polling on voting intention was published from May 2023 onwards, most regularly by the National Institute of Development Administration (NIDA), and increased in frequency after the dissolution of the House in December 2025. The final NIDA survey, conducted between 23 and 27 January 2026 among 2,500 respondents, placed the People's Party on 34.2 per cent and Bhumjaithai on 22.6 per cent. The People's Party did lead the party-list vote at the election, taking 30.56 per cent to Bhumjaithai's 17.90 per cent, though Bhumjaithai won far more seats through the constituencies.

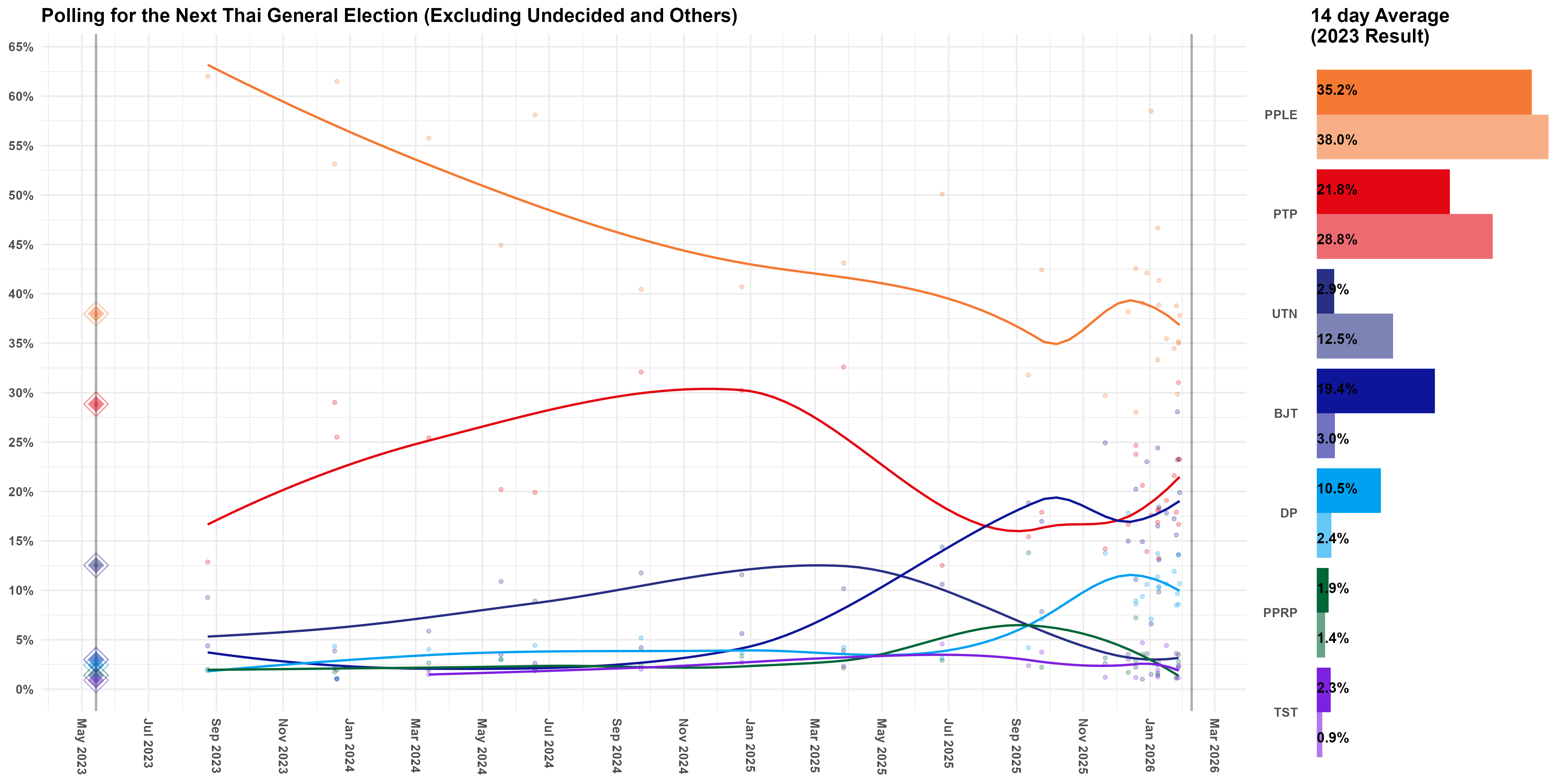
LOESS curve of the polling for the next Thai General Election.

=== Preferred party ===
Fieldwork date(s)	Polling firm	Sample	PPLE ↑ MFP	PTP	UTN	BJT	DP	PPRP	TST	Undecided	Others	Lead
8 February 2026	Election results	–	30.56%	15.43%	2.12%	17.90%	10.91%	0.39%	0.56%	–	–	12.66%
23–27 January 2026	NIDA	2,500	34.20%	16.20%	2.20%	22.60%	13.20%	–	1.12%	2.60%	7.88%	11.60%
23–26 January 2026	Nation Poll	10,890	21.89%	17.02%	1.50%	20.59%	7.09%	–	–	24.73%	7.18%	2.84%
20–27 January 2026	North Bangkok Poll	2,157	35.00%	31.02%	3.50%	13.60%	8.60%	2.80%	2.40%	–	3.08%	3.98%
20–23 January 2026	Suan Dusit	2,269	33.14%	20.76%	–	16.57%	11.46%	–	–	3.31%	14.76% (Note: Economic Party at 3.97%)	12.38%
19–25 January 2026	Rajabhat	11,700	38.80%	17.90%	3.60%	15.60%	8.50%	1.10%	1.20%	–	13.30%	20.90%
16–28 January 2026	Suan Dusit	26,621	35.99%	22.13%	–	18.92%	10.16%	–	–	4.47%	8.33%	13.86%
13–16 January 2026	Suan Dusit	2,586	34.11%	18.37%	–	17.13%	10.25%	–	4.25%	3.33%	12.56%	15.74%
6–9 January 2026	Suan Dusit	2,682	34.23%	16.03%	–	16.22%	9.02%	–	–	10.25%	14.25% (Note: Economic Party at 3.13%)	18.01%
5–8 January 2026	NIDA (Note: Party list vote)	2,500	30.48%	15.44%	2.24%	22.32%	12.56%	–	1.76%	7.92%	7.28% (Note: Economic Party at 4.16%)	8.16%
4–9 January 2026	ThaiRath Poll	40,085	41.36%	13.24%	9.83%	13.08%	10.39%	–	2.65%	–	9.45% (Note: Economic Party at 4.26%)	28.12%
1–8 January 2026	North Bangkok Poll	1,400	26.30%	10.20%	0.80%	9.30%	6.40%	0.90%	0.70%	42.30%	3.10% (Note: Economic Party at 2.20%, Thai Kao Mai Party at 0.60% and Kla Tham Party at 0.30%)	16.00%
24 December 2025	Prawit Wongsuwon withdraws as prime minister nominee. He subsequently resigns as PPRP leader 7 January											
23 December 2025 – 2 January 2026	Sripatum Poll–D-Vote Centre	2,683	58.50%	17.60%	1.50%	6.60%	7.10%	–	–	–	10.40% (Note: Economic Party at 2.70%)	30.90%
22–29 December 2025	Rajabhat	11,900	17.61%	5.82%	1.50%	9.62%	4.43%	1.28%	–	56.02%	3.71% (Note: Kla Tham Party at 0.97%)	38.41%
22–25 December 2025	North Bangkok Poll	1,320	23.30%	12.30%	0.60%	8.90%	5.60%	2.10%	2.80%	37.60%	6.80% (Note: Thai Kao Mai Party at 3.00%, Economic Party at 2.80% and Kla Tham Party at 1.00%)	14.30%
18–29 December 2025	Dailynews x Matichon	93,391										
16–19 December 2025	North Bangkok Poll	1,329	32.60%	18.20%	1.70%	8.50%	6.60%	2.20%	0.90%	21.60% (Note: Included parties not listed as options)	7.70% (Note: Thai Kao Mai Party at 5.40% and Economic Party at 2.30%)	11.00%
16–19 December 2025	Suan Dusit	2,232	24.55%	21.62%	–	17.74%	7.84%	6.32%	–	11.02%	10.91%	2.93%
4–12 December 2025	NIDA	2,500	25.28%	11.04%	2.32%	9.92%	11.80%	1.12%	2.00%	32.40%	4.12% (Note: Economic Party at 2.76%)	7.12%
19–21 November 2025	Suan Dusit	1,794	26.25%	12.54%	2.29%	22.02%	12.15%	2.79%	1.06%	10.42%	10.48% (Note: Economic Party at 2.62%, Kla Tham Party at 1.45%, Thai Kao Mai Party at 1.39%, New Democracy Party at 0.95% and Chart Thai Pattana Party at 0.84%)	4.23%
19–24 September 2025	NIDA	2,500	33.08%	13.96%	6.12%	13.24%	5.52%	1.72%	2.92%	21.64%	1.80%	11.44%
18 October 2025	Abhisit Vejjajiva is elected leader of the Democrat Party											
9–12 September 2025	Suan Dusit	1,232	23.94%	11.61%	–	14.20%	3.17%	10.39%	1.79%	21.35%	13.55% (Note: Thai Ruam Palang Party at 3.25%, New Democracy Party at 1.79% and Thai Progress Party at 1.70%)	2.59%
5 September 2025	Anutin Charnvirakul becomes Prime Minister following the removal of Paetongtarn Shinawatra											
19–25 June 2025	NIDA	2,500	46.08%	11.52%	13.24%	9.76%	2.88%	2.68%	4.20%	7.88%	1.76%	32.84%
24–27 March 2025	NIDA	2,000	37.10%	28.05%	8.75%	3.35%	3.65%	1.85%	2.00%	13.75%	1.50%	9.05%
19–24 December 2024	NIDA	2,000	37.30%	27.70%	10.60%	5.15%	3.40%	3.05%	2.50%	8.20%	2.10% (Note: Prachachat Party at 1.70%)	9.60%
16–23 September 2024	NIDA	2,000	34.25%	27.15%	9.95%	3.55%	4.40%	2.05%	1.70%	15.10%	1.85%	7.10%
16 August 2024	Paetongtarn Shinawatra becomes Prime Minister following the removal of Srettha Thavisin											
7 August 2024	The Move Forward Party is dissolved, being succeeded by the People's Party											
14–18 June 2024	NIDA	2,000	49.20% (Note: As Move Forward Party, People's Party's de facto predecessor)	16.85%	7.55%	2.20%	3.75%	1.75%	1.55%	15.00%	2.15%	32.35%
7–18 May 2024	KPI	1,620	44.90%	20.20%	10.90%	3.50%	3.00%	3.00%	–	–	14.60% (Note: Prachachat Party at 1.30%, Chart Thai Pattana Party at 0.70%)	24.70%
11–13 March 2024	NIDA	2,000	48.45%	22.10%	5.10%	1.70%	3.50%	2.30%	1.30%	12.75%	2.80%	26.35%
9–20 December 2023	SPU	1,168	61.50%	25.50%	1.08%	1.03%	1.04%	1.95%	–	–	7.90%	36.00%
13–18 December 2023	NIDA	2,000	44.05%	24.05%	3.20%	1.75%	3.60%	1.45%	–	16.10%	5.80%	20.00%
22–24 August 2023	SPU	1,253	62.00%	12.87%	9.27%	4.39%	1.86%	2.00%	–	–	7.61%	49.13%
14 May 2023	2023 election	–	37.99%	28.84%	12.54%	2.99%	2.43%	1.41%	0.90%	–	12.90%	9.15%

=== Preferred prime minister ===
Fieldwork date(s)	Polling firm	Sample	Natthaphong	Yodchanan	Julapun	Pirapan	Abhisit	Anutin	Sudarat	Prawit	Undecided	Others	Lead
23–27 January 2026	NIDA	2,500	29.08	12.12	–	1.92	12.52	22.24	1.68	–	9.36	11.08	6.84
20–27 January 2026	North Bangkok Poll	2,157	33.30	31.80	–	3.60	7.60	14.10	2.50	–	–	7.10	1.50
20–23 January 2026	Suan Dusit	2,269	33.80	20.98	–	–	11.24	17.23	–	–	2.87	13.88 (Note: Rangsi Kitiyansap at 4.85)	12.82
19–25 January 2026	Rajabhat	11,700	39.20	17.00	–	3.30	9.10	25.50	–	–	–	5.90	13.70
16–28 January 2026	Suan Dusit	26,621	35.07	21.53	–	–	12.97	16.11	–	–	2.22	12.10	13.54
16–19 January 2026	KPI	2,000											
13–16 January 2026	Suan Dusit	2,586	34.34	19.91	–	–	10.36	16.13	–	–	5.73	13.53	14.43
8–11 January 2026	KPI	2,000	18.80	10.90	–	–	10.20	16.90	–	–	26.20	17.00	7.40
6–9 January 2026	Suan Dusit	2,682	31.99	17.45	–	–	10.81	15.14	–	–	11.63	12.98 (Note: Rangsi Kitiyansap at 3.80)	14.54
5–8 January 2026	NIDA	2,500	24.76	9.64	1.92	1.32	12.12	20.84	2.64	–	14.4	12.36 (Note: Rangsi Kitiyansap at 5.04 and Sirikanya Tansakul at 1.84)	3.92
4–9 January 2026	ThaiRath Poll	40,085	33.25	12.71	–	8.87	10.40	13.55	2.96	–	–	18.26 (Note: Rangsi Kitiyansap at 5.65)	19.70
1–8 January 2026	North Bangkok Poll	1,400	21.80	7.40	–	1.20	7.00	13.00	1.40	0.50	44.60	3.10 (Note: Rangsi Kitiyansap at 1.90, Suchatvee Suwansawat at 0.80 and Thamanat Prompow at 0.40)	22.80
23 December 2025 – 2 January 2026	Sripatum Poll–D-Vote Centre	2,683	57.40	18.20	–	–	7.30	6.70	–	–	–	8.70 (Note: Rangsi Kitiyansap at 3.30)	39.20
22–29 December 2025	Rajabhat	11,900	13.80	4.16	–	1.82	5.29	10.88	–	0.92	56.42	6.21 (Note: Thamanat Prompow at 1.23)	42.62
22–26 December 2025	Suan Dusit	2,151	26.55	17.29	–	–	10.13	18.22	–	–	17.02	10.79	8.33
22–25 December 2025	North Bangkok Poll	1,320	16.10	8.50	–	2.00	6.20	11.30	2.80	0.60	44.70	7.80 (Note: Rangsi Kitiyansap at 3.20, Thamanat Prompow at 2.40 and Suchatvee Suwansawat at 2.20)	28.60
18–29 December 2025	Dailynews x Matichon	93,391											
16–19 December 2025	North Bangkok Poll	1,329	24.40	12.00	–	1.80	9.60	14.20	4.40	2.30	26.30 (Note: Included candidates not listed as options)	5.00 (Note: Rangsi Kitiyansap at 3.30 and Suchatvee Suwansawat at 1.70)	1.90
16–19 December 2025	Suan Dusit	2,232	23.97	21.95	–	3.41	7.30	16.25	–	–	15.28	11.84	2.02
4–12 December 2025	NIDA	2,500	17.20	–	6.28	1.40	10.76	12.32	3.12	–	40.60	8.32 (Note: Rangsi Kitiyansap at 3.88 and Prayut Chan-o-cha at 1.28)	23.40
Fieldwork date(s)	Polling firm	Sample	Natthaphong	Chaikasem	Paetongtarn	Pirapan	Chalermchai	Anutin	Sudarat	Prawit	Undecided	Others	Lead
19–24 September 2025	NIDA	2,500	22.80	6.76	–	2.72	1.76	20.44	7.16	—	27.28	11.08 (Note: Prayut Chan-o-cha at 6.00, Varawut Silpa-archa at 1.24, Abhisit Vejjajiva at 1.04)	4.48
19–25 June 2025	NIDA	2,500	31.48	–	9.20	6.48	–	9.64	6.12	1.48	19.88	15.72 (Note: Prayut Chan-o-cha at 12.72)	11.60
24–27 March 2025	NIDA	2,000	25.80	–	30.90	8.45	1.70	2.85	3.90	1.20	23.70	1.50	5.10
19–24 December 2024	NIDA	2,000	29.85	–	28.80	10.25	1.05	6.45	4.95	1.70	14.40	2.55	1.05
16–23 September 2024	NIDA	2,000	22.90	–	31.35	8.65	–	4.00	4.80	1.15	23.50	3.65	7.85
Fieldwork date(s)	Polling firm	Sample	Pita	Srettha	Paetongtarn	Pirapan	Jurin	Anutin	Sudarat	Prawit	Undecided	Others	Lead
14–18 June 2024	NIDA	2,000	45.50	12.85	4.85	6.85	–	2.05	3.40	—	20.55	3.95	24.95
7–18 May 2024	KPI	1,620	46.90	8.70	10.50	–	1.70	3.30	–	0.40	–	28.60 (Note: Prayut Chan-o-cha at 17.70)	29.20
11–13 March 2024	NIDA	2,000	42.45	17.75	6.00	3.55	–	1.45	2.90	1.05	20.05	4.80	22.40
13–18 December 2023	NIDA	2,000	39.40	22.35	5.75	2.40	–	1.70	1.65	—	18.60	8.15	17.05

=== Government approval ===
Fieldwork date	Polling firm	Sample size	Approve	Disapprove	Neither	Others	Net approval	Notes
30 Nov – 10 Dec 2025	KPI	2,016	28.10	67.20	4.70	–	–39.1	Anutin cabinet
24–26 Feb 2025	NIDA	1,310	45.42	54.58	–	–	–9.16	Paetongtarn cabinet
9–11 Sep 2024	NIDA	1,310	41.30	57.94	–	0.76	–16.64	Paetongtarn cabinet
4–5 Jun 2024	NIDA	1,310	32.59	66.04	–	1.37	–33.45	Srettha cabinet

=== Seat projection ===
Fieldwork date	Polling firm	Sample size	BJT	PPLE ↑ MFP	PTP	KT	Dem	Other
8 Feb 2026	Election results	71.42%	192	120	74	58	21	35
31 Jan–6 Feb 2026	NIDA	3,000	140–150	125–135	110–120	35–45	35–45	<55
14 May 2023	2023 Election	75.64%	71	151	141	New	25	112

== Conduct ==
=== Advance voting issues ===
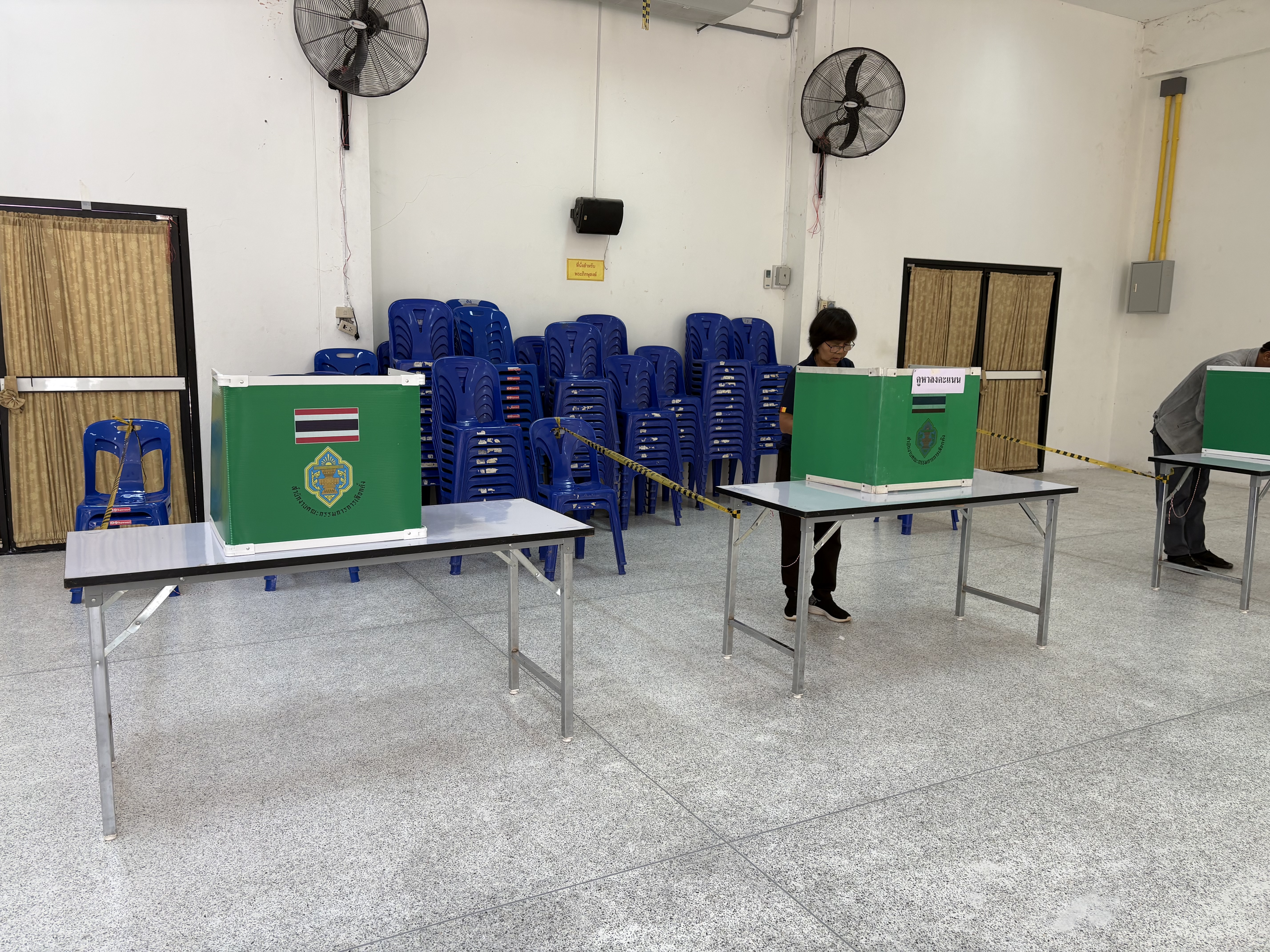
An advance voting station in Sawankhalok, Sukhothai province on 1 February 2026

The advance voting on 1 February saw many complaints of issues with the election process. One reported issue, which was also seen in the previous election, was that election officials wrote wrong codes on ballot envelopes, raising concerns that the ballots might end up in a different district and therefore be counted for the wrong candidate. Voters also reported missing or incorrect on information boards at some polling stations. This included cases where a candidate's information was entirely missing from the information board. In some of these cases, it was reported that polling station officials initially claimed that the missing candidates had been disqualified and only later rectified the mistake. Those affected included candidates from the People's Party, Pheu Thai Party, and Democrat Party.

=== Complaints of irregularities ===
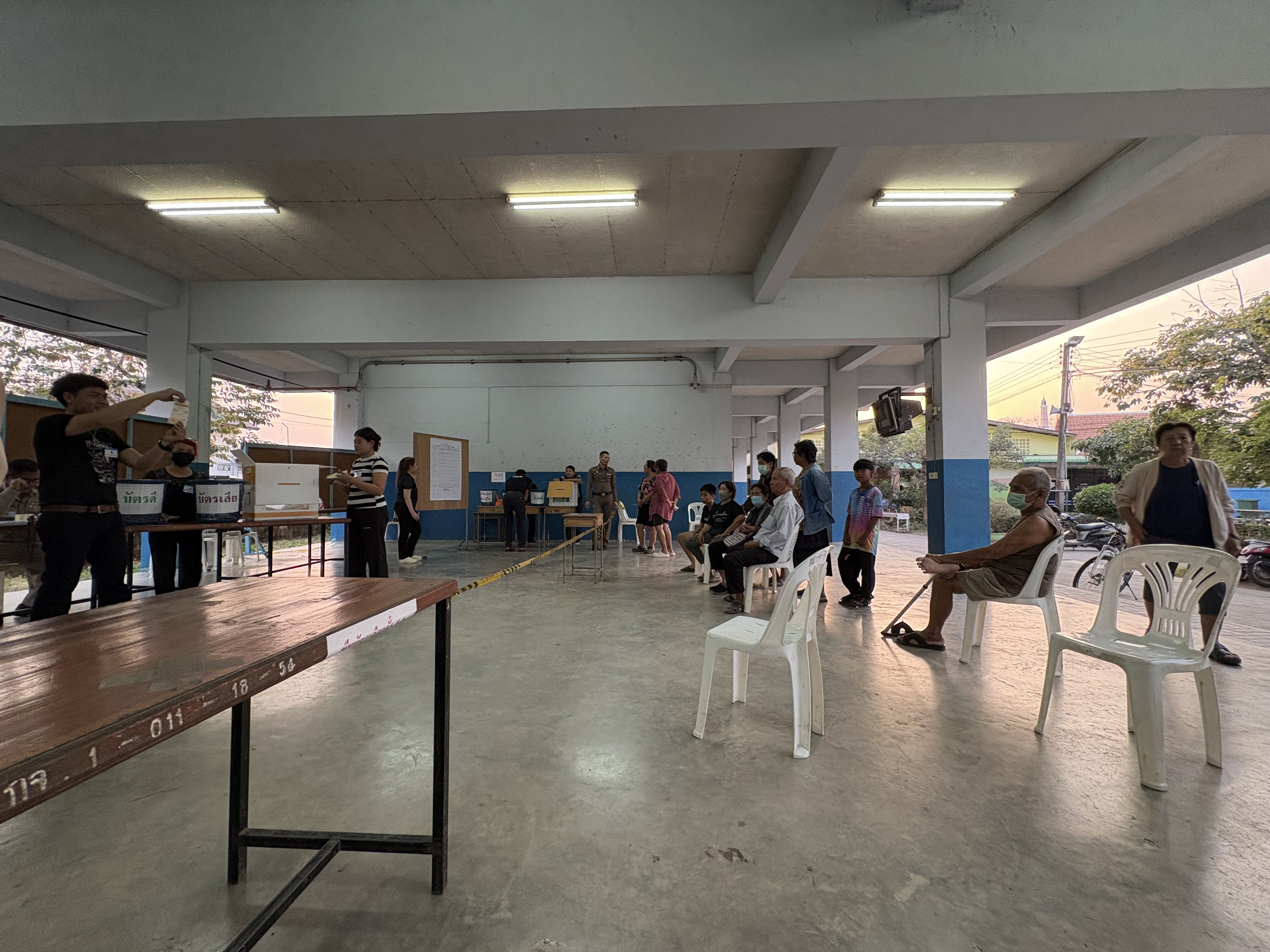
General public observing local ballot counting at a polling station in Si Samrong, Sukhothai

Irregularities were also reported on election day, with the election observation platform Vote62 receiving over 5,000 reports from citizens.

In Chonburi Constituency 1, a large crowd gathered on 9 February to demand a recount following allegations of irregularities, including misplaced and improperly sealed ballot boxes, power outages during vote counting, vote total discrepancies, and vote tally sheets being found in a rubbish bin. The crowd remained guarding the ballot boxes overnight awaiting a decision by the Election Commission, which after a meeting asked for two days to gather and consider evidence before determining whether there would be a recount. A similar incident of crowds gathering to ask for a recount and guarding ballot boxes also occurred in Maha Sarakham Constituency 1.

Following these and similar allegations, the People's Party formally requested recounts in 18 constituencies. One of its former MPs, Wiroj Lakkhanaadisorn, filed a police report against members of the Election Commission in Chonburi. The Pheu Thai Party also urged the Election Commission to investigate and address the concerns. Korn Chatikavanij, deputy leader of the Democrat Party, criticized the Election Commission, expressing disappointment that citizens were unable to feel trust in the election process. Pirapan Salirathavibhaga, the leader of the United Thai Nation Party, posted on his Facebook account demanding a nationwide recount. The Prachachat Party issued a statement asking the Election Commission to investigate irregularities in Pattani and Narathiwat Constituency 4, and the Bhumjaithai candidate in Narathiwat Constituency 3 asked for a recount in that constituency. Former Election Commission member Somchai Srisutthiyakorn criticized the commission's failure to comply with regulations in Chonburi Constituency 1, stating that election showed serious signs of fraud. He further stated that even a recount might not be enough due to the possibility of tampering with improperly sealed boxes and suggested that a repeat election might have to be held in the constituency.

On 12 February, the Election Commission rejected the requests for recounts in Chonburi and Maha Sarakham, stating that its investigation did not find credible evidence. In the same press briefing, it ordered new elections for three polling stations: one in Bangkok where ballots were damaged by rain, and two in Nan and Udon Thani, where polling station officials incorrectly tore ballots. It also ordered a recount of the votes in Pathum Thani Constituency 7, which had been subject to complaints that officials failed to properly count votes in view of the public. Further recounts at eight stations and a fresh election at one station were announced on 17 February, and nine more on 24 February.

=== Controversy over ballot traceability ===
The Election Commission also faced allegations that the barcodes and QR codes on the election ballots compromised voter secrecy and might be unconstitutional. The controversy began after social media users analyzed the codes from photos of ballot papers, discovering that they were unique per ballot and could be matched to the counterfoil containing individual voters' signatures, theoretically allowing any individual's vote to be determined. On 14 February, the Election Commission acknowledged that the ballot codes could indeed be used to link voters to their ballots, but defended the process as a legal measure intended to prevent voter fraud, stating that the ballots, counterfoils, and voter registration data were stored separately. In response, critics argued that the possibility of voter traceability is already inherently unconstitutional, with many citing as precedent the Constitutional Court decision nullifying the 2006 election due to voting booths being positioned with voters' backs towards the public. Legal scholar Prinya Thaewanarumitkul also pointed out that the Election Commission's regulations actually require counterfoils to be kept with the ballots and argued that regardless of storage, the ballots could be photographed during the counting process.

On 13 February, 12 petitions were submitted to the Office of the Ombudsman, which on 16 February sent a letter to the Election Commission asking it to address the complaints within seven days, which was later extended by seven more days on the Commission's request. Multiple cases were filed in the Administrative Court and the Constitutional Court, asking for the election results to be nullified and new elections held. Politicians from the People's Party and the Thai Sang Thai Party also filed cases against the Election Commission in Criminal Court for misconduct. Observers noted that new ballots used in repeat elections on 22 February no longer featured serial numbers on the counterfoil. The Election Commission filed cases against citizen observers at the 22 February election, accusing them of election interference. Critics, including senator Nantana Nantavaropas, said this amounted to a strategic lawsuit against public participation (SLAPP). The Asian Network for Free Elections, which observed the election, said the unique codes engaged Article 25 of the International Covenant on Civil and Political Rights, section 85 of the constitution and section 84 of the Organic Act on the Election of Members of the House of Representatives. The Ombudsman decided to forward the case to the Constitutional Court on 13 March. On 18 March, the court voted 6–3 to accept the Ombudsman's petition and consider the case. The court scheduled its ruling for 28 September 2026 on whether the codes breached the constitutional guarantee of ballot secrecy, a finding that could void the election.

== Results ==
On election night, incumbent prime minister Anutin Charnvirakul of the Bhumjaithai Party claimed victory on projections giving his party around 194 seats, while Natthaphong Ruengpanyawut conceded on projections of just over 116 seats for the opposition People's Party. The Pheu Thai Party, led by Yodchanan Wongsawat, was projected third on around 76 seats. The Election Commission certified 396 constituency seats on 25 February and three more on 4 March, along with all 100 party-list seats. Certification of Suphan Buri constituency 2 was withheld over suspected misconduct by polling officials and was issued on 8 April, bringing the House to its full membership of 500. The certified results gave Bhumjaithai 192 seats, the People's Party 120 and Pheu Thai 74.

Party	Party-list			Constituency			Total seats	+/–
Party	Votes	%	Seats	Votes	%	Seats	Total seats	+/–
People's Party	11,043,309	30.56	32	8,868,301	24.32	88	120	–31
Bhumjaithai Party	6,468,073	17.90	19	10,776,164	29.55	173	192	+121
Pheu Thai Party	5,575,456	15.43	16	6,263,994	17.18	58	74	–67
Democrat Party	3,941,928	10.91	11	2,186,565	6.00	10	21	–4
Economic Party	1,133,055	3.14	3	402,226	1.10	0	3	+3
United Thai Nation Party	766,078	2.12	2	322,404	0.88	0	2	–34
Pheu Chart Thai Party	680,256	1.88	2	538	0.00	0	2	+2
Kla Tham Party	648,662	1.79	2	4,112,457	11.28	56	58	New
Ruam Jai Thai Party	435,225	1.20	1	2,956	0.01	0	1	+1
Prachachat Party	428,848	1.19	1	309,654	0.85	4	5	–4
New Party	314,430	0.87	1	892	0.00	0	1	0
Thai Subthawee Party	305,565	0.85	1	2,646	0.01	0	1	New
New Democracy Party	256,221	0.71	1	24,075	0.07	0	1	0
New Dimension Party	247,365	0.68	1	1,310	0.00	0	1	+1
Thai Pakdee Party	246,823	0.68	1	33,350	0.09	0	1	+1
Thai Sang Thai Party	202,626	0.56	1	150,285	0.41	1	2	–4
People's Power Party	197,510	0.55	1	2,058	0.01	0	1	New
Thai Liberal Party	185,705	0.51	1	17,238	0.05	0	1	0
New Alternative Party	171,061	0.47	1	22,010	0.06	0	1	+1
Thai Ruam Palang Party	166,723	0.46	1	368,904	1.01	5	6	+4
Palang Pracharath Party	141,082	0.39	1	501,061	1.37	4	5	–35
Movement Party	117,078	0.32	0	33,315	0.09	0	0	New
Thai Kao Mai Party	109,579	0.30	0	109,027	0.30	0	0	0
New Palangdharma Party	90,255	0.25	0	86	0.00	0	0	0
New Opportunity Party	80,103	0.22	0	190,007	0.52	1	1	New
Power Thai Party	72,193	0.20	0	306	0.00	0	0	0
Thai Citizen Party	70,567	0.20	0	22,648	0.06	0	0	0
Rak Chart Party	68,592	0.19	0	16,753	0.05	0	0	New
Thai Population Party	64,251	0.18	0	428	0.00	0	0	0
Thai Prompt Party	61,958	0.17	0	6,007	0.02	0	0	0
Futurise Thailand Party	59,873	0.17	0	246	0.00	0	0	New
Thai Teachers for People Party	56,224	0.16	0	180	0.00	0	0	–1
Nation Building Labour Party	54,437	0.15	0	8,604	0.02	0	0	0
Thaichana Party	52,192	0.14	0	1,421	0.00	0	0	0
Thai Progress Party	50,880	0.14	0	1,825	0.01	0	0	0
Party of Thai Counties	47,044	0.13	0	1,796	0.00	0	0	–1
Vision Mai Party	43,439	0.12	0	10,361	0.03	0	0	New
Fair Party	40,509	0.11	0	7,003	0.02	0	0	–1
Klong Thai Party	37,088	0.10	0	390	0.00	0	0	0
Thailand's Future Party	30,341	0.08	0	2,279	0.01	0	0	0
Thai People's Party	28,458	0.08	0	50,178	0.14	0	0	0
Party for the Country	24,668	0.07	0	11,872	0.03	0	0	New
Green Party	24,193	0.07	0	1,066	0.00	0	0	0
Palang Thai Rak Chart Party	22,321	0.06	0	1,611	0.00	0	0	0
Thai Morality Party	21,838	0.06	0	1,609	0.00	0	0	0
Thai Social Democratic Party	19,637	0.05	0	907	0.00	0	0	0
Independent Party	17,890	0.05	0	4,678	0.01	0	0	0
Prompt Party	17,657	0.05	0	981	0.00	0	0	0
Phue Cheevitmai Party	14,089	0.04	0	369	0.00	0	0	New
Land of Dharma Party	14,046	0.04	0	151	0.00	0	0	0
Fusion Party	13,253	0.04	0	1,927	0.01	0	0	New
Plung Sungkom Mai Party	11,756	0.03	0	658	0.00	0	0	–1
New Aspiration Party	9,517	0.03	0	203	0.00	0	0	0
Farmer Network of Thailand Party	9,092	0.03	0	470	0.00	0	0	0
Thai Ruam Thai Party	8,132	0.02	0	94	0.00	0	0	0
Thai Nation's People Volunteer Party	5,766	0.02	0	176	0.00	0	0	New
Thai Pitak Tham Party	5,662	0.02	0	1,563	0.00	0	0	New
Sammaa Sovereign Party				1,504	0.00	0	0	New
Rakstham Party				191	0.00	0	0	0
Action Coalition Party				113	0.00	0	0	0
None of the above	1,108,123	3.07	–	1,608,250	4.41	–	–	–
Total	36,138,702	100.00	100	36,470,341	100.00	400	500	0 (Note: Seat changes do not sum to zero because two parties that won seats in 2023 did not contest the 2026 election. Chart Thai Pattana (10 seats) fielded no candidates after its leader Varawut Silpa-archa and all ten of its MPs resigned to join Bhumjaithai on 15 December 2025, and Chart Pattana (2 seats) resolved to sit the election out without dissolving.)
Valid votes	36,138,702	95.59		36,470,341	96.46			
Invalid/blank votes	1,669,106	4.41		1,337,452	3.54			
Total votes	37,807,808	100.00		37,807,793	100.00			
Registered voters/turnout	52,933,610	71.42		52,933,610	71.42			
Source: Election Commission

Turnout was 71.42 per cent. Of the 37,807,781 party-list ballots cast, 35,030,601 were valid, 1,669,006 were invalid and 1,108,051 were marked for no party.

Bhumjaithai's strength in the constituencies was concentrated geographically. It led the party-list vote in 56 constituencies, compared with 215 for the People's Party, and won no seat in Bangkok, where the People's Party took all 33.

=== Results by province ===
Province	Total seats	Seats won									
Province	Total seats	BJT	PPLE	PTP	KT	Dem	TRP	PPRP	PCC	TST	NOP
Amnat Charoen	2	2									
Ang Thong	2	2									
Bangkok	33		33								
Bueng Kan	3	3									
Buriram	10	10									
Chachoengsao	4			1	3						
Chai Nat	2	1		1							
Chaiyaphum	7	3		3	1						
Chanthaburi	3	3									
Chiang Mai	10		6		4						
Chiang Rai	7	1		2	4						
Chonburi	10	5	5								
Chumphon	3	3									
Kalasin	6	1		4	1						
Kamphaeng Phet	4			2	2						
Kanchanaburi	5	3		2							
Khon Kaen	11	3	2	3	3						
Krabi	3	3									
Lampang	4		2		2						
Lamphun	2		2								
Loei	4	1		3							
Lopburi	4	3		1							
Mae Hong Son	2	1			1						
Maha Sarakham	6	5		1							
Mukdahan	2	1			1						
Nakhon Nayok	2	1			1						
Nakhon Pathom	6	4	1		1						
Nakhon Phanom	4	2		2							
Nakhon Ratchasima	16	3	3	10							
Nakhon Sawan	6	5			1						
Nakhon Si Thammarat	9	4			1	4					
Nan	3		2		1						
Narathiwat	5	1			3				1		
Nong Bua Lamphu	3			1	2						
Nong Khai	3	1						2			
Nonthaburi	8		8								
Pathum Thani	8	2	5	1							
Pattani	5	4			1						
Phang Nga	2	2									
Phatthalung	3	2			1						
Phayao	3				3						
Phetchabun	6	6									
Phetchaburi	3	3									
Phichit	3	3									
Phitsanulok	5	3	1	1							
Phra Nakhon Si Ayutthaya	5	5									
Phrae	3	2	1								
Phuket	3		2		1						
Prachinburi	3	3									
Prachuap Khiri Khan	3	2			1						
Ranong	1	1									
Ratchaburi	5	3			2						
Rayong	5	1	3			1					
Roi Et	8	1		4	2					1	
Sa Kaeo	3				1			2			
Sakon Nakhon	7	1		3	3						
Samut Prakan	8	1	7								
Samut Sakhon	4	2	2								
Samut Songkhram	1		1								
Saraburi	4	3			1						
Satun	2	2									
Sing Buri	1	1									
Sisaket	9	7		2							
Songkhla	9	4			3	2					
Sukhothai	4	1		3							
Suphan Buri	5	4			1						
Surat Thani	7	3			2	1	1				
Surin	8	8									
Tak	3	1			2						
Trang	4	2				2					
Trat	1	1									
Ubon Ratchathani	11	4		3			4				
Udon Thani	10	4	2	4							
Uthai Thani	2	2									
Uttaradit	3	1		1							1
Yala	3								3		
Yasothon	3	3									
Total	400	173	88	58	56	10	5	4	4	1	1
Source: Thai PBS

=== Party-list vote by province ===
Province
Province	PPLE	BJT	PTP	Dem	ECON	UTN	KT	PCC
Amnat Charoen	23.29	25.53	22.34	5.25	4.32	1.69	0.85	0.14
Ang Thong	28.91	36.31	9.66	3.33	2.81	1.73	0.12	0.36
Bangkok	46.30	17.91	10.03	10.21	2.09	2.49	0.23	0.10
Bueng Kan	23.70	19.17	31.17	2.50	3.06	2.65	1.35	0.11
Buriram	18.29	54.05	8.68	1.61	2.77	1.13	0.10	0.14
Chachoengsao	34.57	13.11	13.69	6.62	4.54	2.71	4.39	0.34
Chai Nat	28.32	23.16	13.24	7.26	3.71	2.2	0.22	0.24
Chaiyaphum	24.71	14.21	26.79	2.76	4.42	2.30	2.17	0.19
Chanthaburi	30.74	22.69	7.90	8.68	6.96	3.36	0.29	0.16
Chiang Mai	41.59	7.42	23.92	3.98	2.09	1.62	2.24	0.14
Chiang Rai	35.01	7.09	27.76	2.32	2.31	2.02	6.22	0.18
Chonburi	41.28	23.96	6.81	6.52	3.79	2.77	0.30	0.10
Chumphon	15.15	21.55	1.82	47.04	1.87	1.96	0.25	0.13
Kalasin	24.41	12.07	32.85	2.22	3.91	2.11	1.16	0.19
Kamphaeng Phet	29.64	12.02	15.28	9.70	4.20	2.91	3.67	0.28
Kanchanaburi	30.30	20.23	15.48	6.21	3.80	2.71	0.27	0.19
Khon Kaen	28.59	13.37	29.76	2.20	3.53	1.82	3.51	0.16
Krabi	18.92	13.55	2.31	47.78	1.44	1.06	0.34	2.03
Lampang	37.18	8.22	20.77	3.50	2.51	1.82	6.56	0.16
Lamphun	41.73	7.60	22.80	4.67	2.84	2.36	0.43	0.12
Loei	26.26	14.34	25.32	4.47	4.11	1.71	0.86	0.20
Lopburi	28.84	21.28	16.69	4.48	4.23	3.09	0.91	0.19
Mae Hong Son	37.98	8.90	8.08	7.40	2.63	1.55	5.05	0.26
Maha Sarakham	25.43	17.66	32.45	1.99	3.38	2.31	0.90	0.15
Mukdahan	26.11	10.08	30.95	1.68	3.78	1.45	3.72	0.21
Nakhon Nayok	28.61	20.05	10.02	7.85	4.80	4.75	2.25	0.29
Nakhon Pathom	37.37	21.39	9.89	6.05	3.45	3.46	1.33	0.16
Nakhon Phanom	21.55	21.40	36.45	1.06	2.72	1.38	0.15	0.14
Nakhon Ratchasima	29.13	18.29	21.61	2.77	5.07	2.27	0.69	0.17
Nakhon Sawan	28.20	24.28	10.45	7.04	3.65	2.22	1.45	0.24
Nakhon Si Thammarat	15.98	11.94	1.71	56.06	1.39	1.38	0.93	0.21
Nan	34.61	7.60	20.33	4.12	2.32	1.33	7.15	0.19
Narathiwat	23.52	8.09	1.35	8.87	0.71	0.89	8.02	31.30
Nong Bua Lamphu	26.78	11.32	28.62	1.68	4.17	1.19	5.98	0.15
Nong Khai	27.66	17.16	28.81	2.10	3.77	1.19	0.21	0.19
Nonthaburi	43.53	19.40	10.31	7.59	2.33	2.66	0.45	0.11
Pathum Thani	43.34	18.58	13.20	5.51	3.18	2.27	0.89	0.20
Pattani	27.68	8.51	1.35	11.10	0.68	1.27	1.58	31.98
Phang Nga	19.06	15.41	3.14	43.40	1.82	1.53	1.21	0.32
Phatthalung	15.28	16.07	2.96	52.59	1.08	1.61	1.26	0.25
Phayao	25.46	2.73	12.98	1.36	1.29	0.63	43.50	0.08
Phetchabun	26.35	28.93	10.85	5.28	4.32	1.98	0.87	0.23
Phetchaburi	26.20	30.42	5.67	11.29	3.66	2.92	0.38	0.21
Phichit	28.51	26.45	10.28	6.27	3.54	4.13	1.39	0.17
Phitsanulok	31.42	19.60	15.76	6.35	3.67	2.82	0.25	0.21
Phra Nakhon Si Ayutthaya	35.94	25.58	11.38	3.97	3.46	2.98	0.12	0.18
Phrae	31.06	23.02	24.94	2.31	1.94	1.25	0.99	0.12
Phuket	33.09	17.08	2.94	27.80	2.69	2.35	1.62	0.39
Prachinburi	34.31	21.18	11.32	4.52	4.78	2.24	0.29	0.17
Prachuap Khiri Khan	26.27	19.57	5.16	19.54	2.90	2.46	6.11	0.19
Ranong	18.97	31.17	2.38	30.49	2.15	1.75	0.23	0.25
Ratchaburi	32.38	19.09	8.20	9.68	3.73	3.33	2.80	0.24
Rayong	41.34	16.72	6.02	15.19	3.43	2.81	0.11	0.11
Roi Et	24.61	11.36	36.06	1.46	2.78	1.76	3.01	0.15
Sa Kaeo	24.04	13.75	11.78	3.67	7.67	3.17	2.14	0.17
Sakon Nakhon	26.02	13.35	31.03	1.86	4.20	2.52	2.29	0.19
Samut Prakan	47.00	16.22	12.60	5.94	2.85	2.01	0.37	0.10
Samut Sakhon	41.65	17.30	8.21	10.21	3.19	2.42	1.19	0.11
Samut Songkhram	34.82	14.40	7.19	18.28	3.11	3.20	1.61	0.10
Saraburi	35.99	17.89	12.44	4.78	4.39	2.43	0.73	0.14
Satun	23.00	17.04	3.71	36.82	1.37	1.17	1.12	2.08
Sing Buri	30.40	21.15	11.30	3.79	3.64	2.31	0.17	0.36
Sisaket	20.48	27.67	27.77	1.39	3.55	1.30	0.49	0.24
Songkhla	20.94	12.29	1.53	48.05	1.47	1.50	1.97	1.57
Sukhothai	28.24	15.49	19.63	11.50	3.44	1.81	0.79	0.17
Suphan Buri	30.54	36.10	8.55	2.73	2.62	2.34	0.78	0.17
Surat Thani	17.86	8.76	2.00	55.24	1.43	1.88	0.84	0.14
Surin	22.78	32.14	19.67	1.99	4.84	1.35	0.73	0.22
Tak	30.79	11.74	11.36	13.02	3.47	3.44	2.10	0.18
Trang	16.30	7.55	1.37	62.12	1.00	1.07	0.15	0.18
Trat	27.17	28.68	5.61	11.34	6.65	2.80	1.10	0.18
Ubon Ratchathani	22.39	14.32	19.41	3.88	4.02	1.73	1.48	0.16
Udon Thani	28.37	12.52	31.52	1.94	4.05	2.33	0.87	0.11
Uthai Thani	23.81	39.87	6.99	7.97	2.87	1.72	0.15	0.18
Uttaradit	30.38	14.25	23.33	4.38	3.37	1.98	0.31	0.18
Yala	24.52	6.58	1.43	12.38	0.87	0.97	1.80	36.61
Yasothon	22.33	21.26	35.60	1.75	2.80	0.95	0.24	0.11
Total	30.56	17.90	15.43	10.91	3.14	2.12	1.79	1.19
Source: Election Commission

== Aftermath ==
On 13 February, Bhumjaithai reached an agreement to form a coalition government with Pheu Thai. Anutin eventually finalized a coalition government composed of 292 MPs from Bhumjaithai, Pheu Thai, Prachachat, Palang Pracharath, and a number of small parties. Kla Tham and the Democrat Party were excluded from this coalition. The new House elected Anutin as prime minister on 19 March 2026 with 293 votes, and the Second Anutin cabinet was sworn in on 30 March.

== Reactions ==
=== Bhumjaithai Party ===
Incumbent prime minister Anutin Charnvirakul declared victory following the elections. While acknowledging that the official number of MPs have not yet been certified, Anutin stated that the party accepted the expectations from voters that Bhumjaithai would help form the next government. He also promised to govern with integrity, uphold democracy, and congratulated MPs from all parties who won their seats. When asked which coalition Bhumjaithai would make, Anutin stated that he would hold a meeting with the party's executive committee and wait for figures to stabilise.

=== Democrat Party ===
Democrat leader Abhisit Vejjajiva stated that the party was prepared to take an opposition role, acknowledging that the Democrats won about 20 seats in the House of Representatives. While accepting that the Democrats fell short in Bangkok, he noted the party's party-list support had significantly increased compared to past elections. Abhisit also pledged to fight corruption and ensure clean governance. When asked about the party's position if invited to a coalition, Abhisit iterated that coalition formation would depend on party conditions, stating that the Democrats would not support any arrangement relating to dark money. He added that the party had not been immediately contacted for coalition talks. The Democrats were certified with 21 seats, four fewer than in 2023, and were left out of the coalition Anutin assembled in March.

=== Kla Tham Party ===
Deputy Prime Minister Thamanat Prompow first noted that the results exceeded expectations, especially in northern Thailand. He remained confident that the party would surpass more than 50 seats, emphasizing how the ministers and candidates of the Kla Tham Party were actively working in their respective constituencies throughout the campaign. Thamanat remarked that the party was still waiting for an invitation from Bhumjaithai to renew their past coalition. The party finished with 58 seats, ahead of his forecast, but no invitation came and Kla Tham was left out of the government.

=== People's Party ===
People's Party leader Natthaphong Ruengpanyawut accepted the preliminary results that indicated the party was unlikely to finish first. After thanking voters, Natthaphong remarked how the constitutional referendum appeared to be approved by the public. He agreed that the party would respect parliamentary process, and to lead the opposition if Bhumjaithai managed to form a government. Natthaphong reiterated that it would not join a government led by a Bhumjaithai prime minister and that it would not form a rival coalition against a potential Bhumjaithai government.

=== Pheu Thai Party ===
Pheu Thai leaders also thanked their supporters after the party placed third in the election. Former Deputy Finance Minister Julapun Amornvivat stated that Pheu Thai respected the democratic process and accepted that government formation was the responsibility of Bhumjaithai. Julapun stated that the party was ready to serve the public, whether in government or opposition. He noted that no discussions on coalition participation had taken place and would also review factors behind its lower performance following the completion of the vote count.

=== Thai Sang Thai Party ===
Thai Sang Thai was reduced to a single party-list seat. On 12 February Sudarat Keyuraphan announced that she would resign as party leader, saying that "there is no place for idealists" in Thai politics.

=== Financial markets ===
Thai equities rallied when trading resumed on 9 February. The SET Index closed at 1,400.89, up 46.88 points or 3.46 per cent, having reacted at the open to unofficial results that pointed to Bhumjaithai leading the next government and easing fears of a political vacuum. Turnover reached 102.1 billion baht, the first hundred-billion-baht session in a year and five months. Foreign investors bought a net 16.5 billion baht and institutions a net 6.2 billion, while domestic retail investors sold a net 24.3 billion.

Therdsak Thaveeteeratham of Asia Plus Securities called the rally a surprise, saying the market read the result as improving the odds of a stable government formation and of sustained fund flows back into Thai stocks. Asadej Kongsiri, president of the Stock Exchange of Thailand, said investors expected continuity from the outgoing administration and welcomed policies aimed at domestic demand and living costs. Several analysts warned that profit-taking was likely after so sharp a jump.

=== International ===
Foreign governments said little in the days after the vote, most of them waiting for parliament to choose a prime minister. Once Anutin was returned to office on 19 March, United States Secretary of State Marco Rubio congratulated him and said the United States valued an alliance and friendship with Thailand spanning nearly two centuries, singling out law enforcement cooperation against cyber-scam networks and the modernisation of the defence relationship. Malaysian Prime Minister Anwar Ibrahim described Anutin as a "dear friend" and wrote that the two countries' "fates are like two rivers born of the same spring", pointing to trade, investment and cooperation along the border. Indian Prime Minister Narendra Modi followed the next day, saying that he looked forward to deepening the India-Thailand strategic partnership.

=== Analysis ===
Greg Raymond of the Australian National University wrote a fortnight after the vote that the outcome reflected a political system built on patronage and on accommodation with the palace, and that Bhumjaithai's move from coalition broker to governing party made structural reform unlikely. He traced Anutin's political education to Newin Chidchob, the Buriram politician who founded Bhumjaithai and who in 2008 delivered the bloc of votes that made Abhisit Vejjajiva prime minister. Raymond expected the coalition to survive a full term while constitutional change stalled, noting that the referendum held alongside the election was only the first of three required and that any draft would still need the support of a conservative Senate. He also observed that allegations of irregularities had left the Election Commission facing public scepticism, and that the result coincided with the release of Transparency International's 2025 Corruption Perceptions Index, which placed Thailand below Laos and Vietnam.

== See also ==
- 2026 Thai constitutional referendum
- 2026 Thai House of Representatives
- Results of the 2026 Thai general election
- Second Anutin cabinet
