= Opportunity Party =

Opportunity Party may refer to:

- Opportunity Party (Albania), political party in Albania
- Opportunity Party (New Zealand), political party in New Zealand

== See also ==
- New Opportunity Party, political party in Thailand
