= New Alternative Party =

New Alternative Party may refer to:

- New Alternative Party (South Korea), South Korean political party
- New Alternative Party (Thailand), Thai political party
