= Anutin cabinet =

Anutin cabinet may refer to:

- First Anutin cabinet (September 2025–March 2026), Thai government
- Second Anutin cabinet (March 2026–), Thai government
