= Rangsima Rodrasamee =

Thai politician (born 1962)

- รังสิมา รอดรัศมี
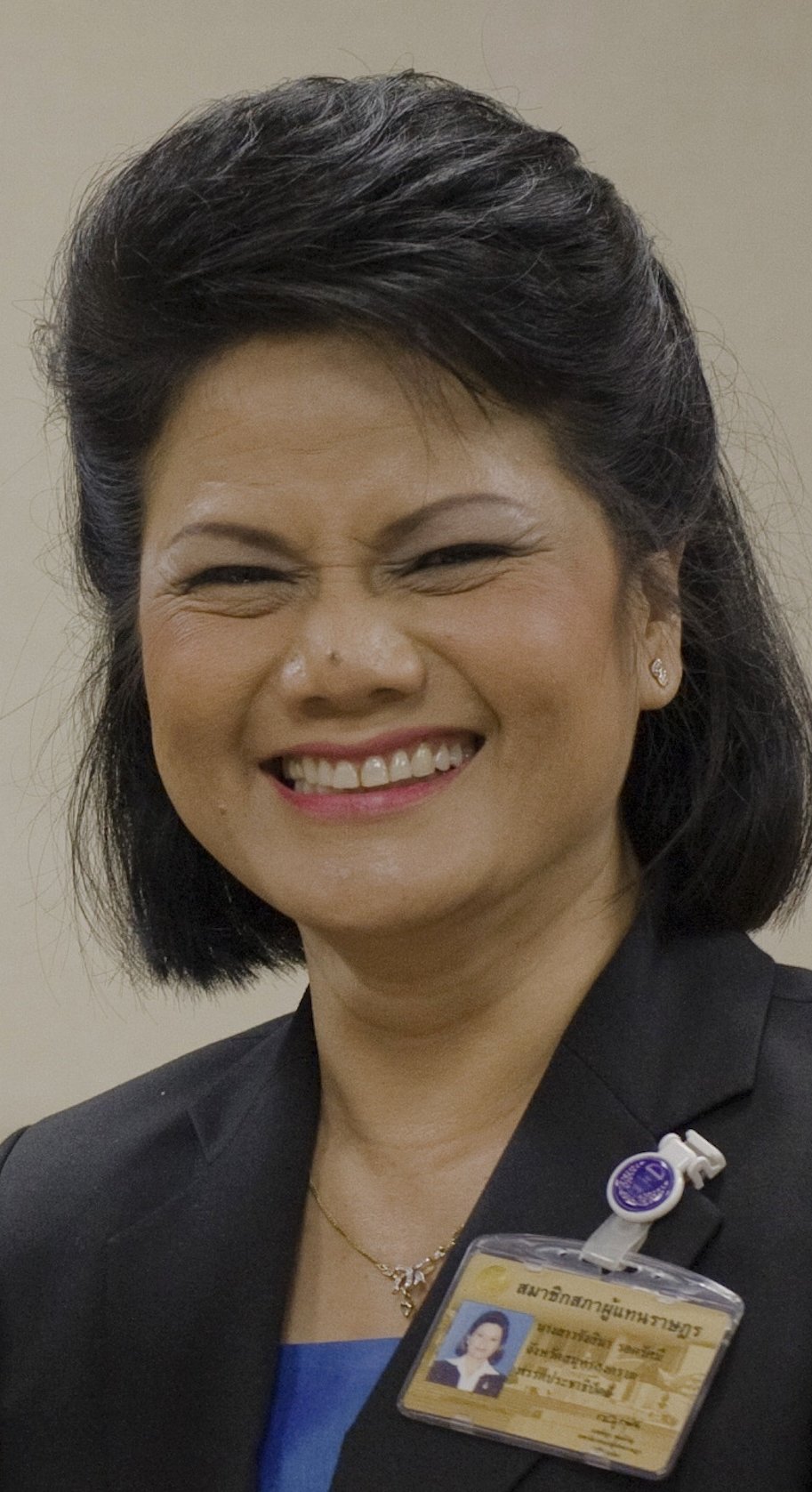
- Rangsima Rodrasamee on November 24, 2010 at the Government House.

Member of the House of Representatives for Samut Songkhram 1st District
- In office 6 January 2001 – 20 March 2023
- Preceded by: Nukul Thanikul
- Succeeded by: Arnupap Likitamnuaychai

Personal details
- Born: 13 August 1962 (age 64) Amphawa, Samut Songkhram, Thailand
- Party: Democrat Party (1996–2023); United Thai Nation Party (2023)
- Education: Prince of Songkla University

Rangsima Rodrasamee (Thai: รังสิมา รอดรัศมี; born 13 August 1962) is a Thai politician former representatives for Samut Songkhram 1st District.

== Political careers ==
Rodrasamee served as a member of parliament from 2001 to 2023. In 2011 she took on the alias "Council Star" from journalists after prominent debates in the House of Representatives.

On 1 March 2023, she joined the United Thai Nation Party, after always being with the Democrat Party.

She was defeated by Arnupap Likitamnuaychai, a new candidate from the Move Forward Party in the 2023 general election. After knowing the results of the vote, she said in an interview that she would retire from politics, and turn to business instead.

== Personal life and education ==
She graduated from the Faculty of Nursing, Prince of Songkla University, Southern Thailand. She has been a nurse at various hospitals for more than 20 years.

Rodrasamee is single. On 23 March 2017, she crashed her white Mercedes-Benz C-Class C 200 into a road barrier in Samut Songkhram and was immediately taken to the hospital.
