= Economic Party (Thailand) =

Political organization

Economic Party พรรคเศรษฐกิจ
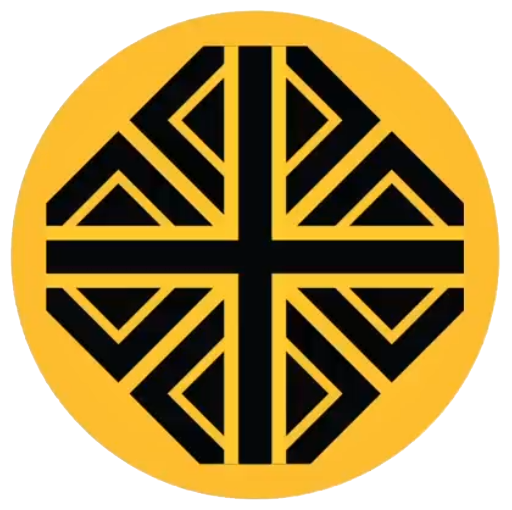
- Leader: Rangsi Kitiyansap
- Chairperson: Chris Potranandana
- Secretary-General: Peeraphon Kanokvalai
- Founded: 10 August 2018 (as the Thai Civil Power Party); 19 February 2023 (as the Zen-dai Party); 26 April 2025 (as the Economic Party)
- Split from: Move Forward Party (faction)
- Preceded by: Zen-dai Group
- Headquarters: 226/1 Phetkasem Road, Wat Tha Phra Subdistrict, Bangkok Yai District, Bangkok 10600
- Ideology: Right-libertarianism; Chicagoanism; Anti-immigration; Chauvinism (Accused); Sinophillia
- Political position: Right-wing to far-right
- Colours: Black; Yellow
- House of Representatives: 3 / 500
- Bangkok Metropolitan Council: 0 / 50

Website
- economicparty.org

The Economic Party (Thai: พรรคเศรษฐกิจ) is a Thai nationalist and economically libertarian political party founded on 2 March 2018, with the original name of Thai Citizen Power. It later also used the names Thai Citizen Party and Zen-dai Party.

== History ==
=== Thai Citizen Power Party ===
The Thai Citizen Power Party was formed by former ministers and former MPs from all regions of the country, led by Samphan Lertnuwat, a former minister attached to the Prime Minister's Office, as the prospective party leader. Other founding members included several former ministers, such as Ekkaporn Rakkhamsuk and Piyanat Watcharapon.

The party held its first general meeting on Sunday, 29 April 2018, at 13:30 at the Miracle Grand Hotel. Samphan Lertnuwat was elected as the first party leader, and Ekkaporn Rakkhamsuk was elected as the first party secretary-general, along with five deputy party leaders. Silampa Lertnuwat was appointed as the deputy secretary-general. Mr. Samphan and his team officially submitted the registration for the establishment of the Thai Citizen Power Party on Tuesday, May 22, 2018. The Election Commission registered the Thai Citizen Power Party as the 4th political party of 2018 on Friday, August 10, 2018, and it was published in the Royal Gazette on Thursday, 13 September 2018.

=== Thai Citizen Party ===
Later, the Thai Citizen Power Party held an extraordinary general meeting (3/2018) on December 10, 2018, where it was resolved to change the party's name to Thai Citizen Power Party. Mr. Samphan Lertnuwat continued to serve as the party leader. Subsequently, Mr. Samphan decided to resign from his positions as party leader and party member. He took his daughter, Silumpa, who was the party's only MP, to join the United Thai Nation Party after the party's executive committee resolved to expel them on 8 February 2023.

=== Zen-dai Party ===
After Mr. Samphan Lertnuwat resigned as the party leader, the Thai Citizen Power Party held an annual general meeting to elect a new executive committee on 19 February 2023. The meeting elected Chris Potanan, a former founder of the Future Forward Party, as the new party leader and changed the party's name to Zen-dai Party. The Zen-dai Party held its first public rally on Sunday, 5 March 2023.

=== Economic Party ===
Chris Potanan, leader of the Zen Dai Party, announced his resignation as party leader on 25 April 2025, to pave the way for a new leader to be elected at the party's general meeting the following day. The party's meeting changed its name to the Economic Party and elected a new party executive committee. The meeting resolved to appoint General Rangsi Kitiyanathap, former director-general of the Royal Thai Army Radio and Television Station, to the position of party leader, while Chris Potanan moved to the position of party chairman, while the party secretary-general remains Peerapol Kanokwanlai. The Economic Party proposed THE FINAL EXIT policy aiming to revive the Thai economy. The Economic Party has proposed 4 main policies, including:

1. MEGA PROJECT INFRASTRUCTURE elevates Thailand to become a global logistics hub through a high-speed rail network connecting Laos-Thailand-Myanmar-India-Malaysia-Singapore, covering a population of over 1.7 billion people.
2. OCEAN LINK STRATEGY Unlocks Marine Potential, Drives Oceanside Industrial-Agricultural Zones, Attracts Investment from BRICS, Targets Average Income of Citizens to Reach $20,000/Year in 10 Years.
3. ZERO CORRUPTION proposes a new anti-corruption law, with the highest penalty being death penalty, and execution within 1 year after the Supreme Court's verdict, to increase transparency in administration.
4. JUSTICE SYSTEM REFORM Reform the justice system, separate arrest from investigation, break the cycle of systematic crime, and unlock economic barriers.

The party's long-term goal is to have Thai people earn an average of 50,000 baht per month within 16 years and push the economy to grow by an average of 6.5% per year to elevate Thailand to a fully developed country. In national defence, the party support Thailand joint development military equipment with China

== Political Role ==
In the 2019 Thai general election, the Thai Citizen Power Party had one party-list MP, Silumpa Lertnuwat.

After changing its name to the Zen-dai Party, one member of the Bangkok Metropolitan Council from the Move Forward Party, Peeraphon Kanokvalai, joined the Zen-dai Party and also served as its secretary-general.

In the 2023 Thai general election, the Zen-dai Party announced its candidacy primarily in the Bangkok area, contesting in 20 districts and fielding 11 party-list candidates. Some candidates had previously run for the Bangkok Metropolitan Council under the Move Forward Party but were not elected.

== Party Ideology ==
The Zen-dai Party's policies, as announced on their website, support economic freedom through free market policies, free trade, tax rate reductions, and downsizing the state in line with Chicago School of Economics principles. The party's social and political policies focus on reducing and eliminating cronyism in society and promoting democracy without relying on power structures established for the benefit of a select few.

== Party Personnel ==
=== Party Leaders ===
Thai Civil Power Party
| No. | Name | Start | End |
|---|---|---|---|
| 1 | Samphan Lertnuwat | 10 August 2018 | 10 December 2018 |
Thai Citizen Power Party
| 2 | Ekkaporn Rakkhamsuk | 10 December 2018 | 6 February 2019 |
| – | Silumpa Lertnuwat | 6 February 2019 (Acting) | 15 September 2019 |
| (1) | Samphan Lertnuwat | 15 September 2019 | 8 February 2023 |
Zen-dai Party
| 3 | Chris Potanan | 19 February 2023 | Present |

=== Party Secretaries ===
Thai Civil Power Party
| No. | Name | Start | End |
|---|---|---|---|
| 1 | Ekkaporn Rakkhamsuk | 10 August 2018 | 10 December 2018 |
Thai Citizen Power Party
| (1) | Ekkaporn Rakkhamsuk | 10 December 2018 | 6 February 2019 |
| – | Somkiat Watthanasirichai | 6 February 2019 (Acting) | 15 September 2019 |
| 2 | Silumpa Lertnuwat | 15 September 2019 | 8 February 2023 |
Zen-dai Party
| 3 | Peeraphon Kanokvalai | 19 February 2023 | Present |

== General Election Results ==
| Election | Number of Seats | Total Votes | Vote Share | Seat Change | Election Outcome | Election Leader |
|---|---|---|---|---|---|---|
Thai Citizen Power Party
| 2019 | 1 / 500 | 44,961 | 0.13% | ▲1 | Junior partner in governing coalition | Samphan Lertnuwat |
Zen-dai Party
| 2023 | 0 / 500 | 10,410 | | ▼1 | Not Elected | Chris Potanan |
Economic Party
| 2026 | 3 / 500 | 1,047,721 | 3.17% | ▲3 | Junior partner in governing coalition | Rangsi Kitiyansap |

== See also ==
- Politics of Thailand
- List of political parties in Thailand
