= New Democracy Party (Thailand) =

Thai political party

New Democracy Party พรรคประชาธิปไตยใหม่
- Abbreviation: NDP.
- Leader: Suratin Pichan
- Secretary-General: Jumrus Kraiyasit
- Founded: 21 April 2011
- Headquarters: Bangkok, Thailand
- Membership (2023): 42,770
- Ideology: Social democracy
- Political position: Centre-left
- House of Representatives: 1 / 500

Website
- newdemocratic.org

The New Democracy Party (NDP; Thai: พรรคประชาธิปไตยใหม่, Phak Prachathipataimai) is a political party in Thailand founded on 21 April 2011. Suratin Pichan is Leader and Nipon Chuenta is Deputy Leader and Jumrus Kraiyasit is Secretary-General.

== Election results ==
Election	Total seats won	Total votes	Share of votes	Seat change	Outcome of election	Election leader
2011	1 / 500	125,784	0.39%	▲1 seats	Junior partner in governing coalition	Suratin Pichan
2014	Unconstitutional - Nullified					Suratin Pichan
2019	1 / 500	39,260	0.11%	1 seat	Junior partner in governing coalition	Suratin Pichan
2023	1 / 500	273,428	0.72%	1 seat	Opposition	Suratin Pichan
2026	1 / 500	24,079	0.07%	1 seat	Junior partner in governing coalition	Suratin Pichan
