= Sihasak Phuangketkeow =

Thai diplomat and politician

- สีหศักดิ์ พวงเกตุแก้ว
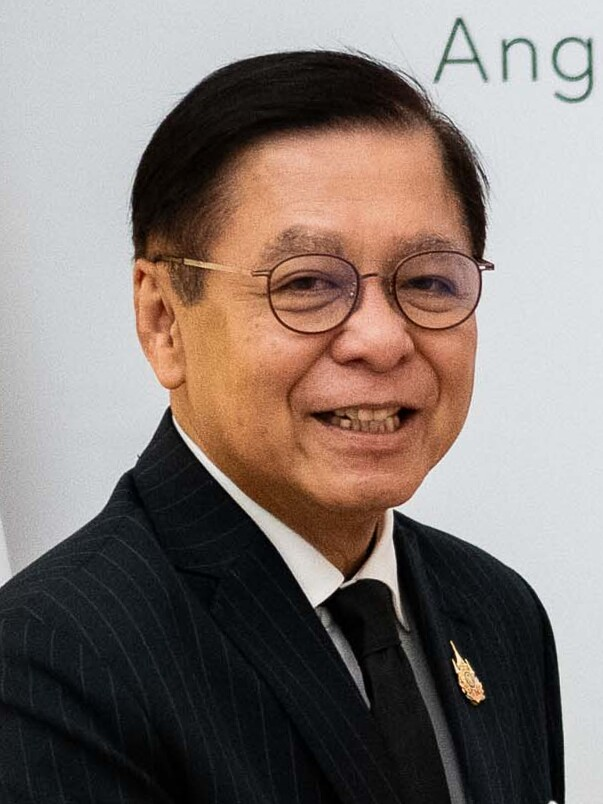
- Sihasak in 2026

Deputy Prime Minister of Thailand
- Incumbent
- Assumed office 30 March 2026
- Prime Minister: Anutin Charnvirakul

Minister of Foreign Affairs
- Incumbent
- Assumed office 19 September 2025
- Prime Minister: Anutin Charnvirakul
- Preceded by: Maris Sangiampongsa

President of the United Nations Human Rights Council
- In office 19 June 2010 – 18 June 2011
- Preceded by: Alex Van Meeuwen
- Succeeded by: Laura Dupuy Lasserre

Personal details
- Born: 21 December 1957 (age 68) Bangkok, Thailand
- Party: Bhumjaithai Party
- Spouse: Varaporn Phuangketkeow
- Children: Pavikkorn Phuangketkeow
- Education: Chulalongkorn University (BPolSci, International Relations); Johns Hopkins University (MA, International Public Policy)

Sihasak Phuangketkeow (Thai: สีหศักดิ์ พวงเกตุแก้ว, RTGS: Sihasak Phuangketkaeo; born 21 December 1957) is a Thai career diplomat and politician who has served as Thailand's Minister of Foreign Affairs since 19 September 2025. He previously served as Vice Minister for Foreign Affairs (2023–2024), Permanent Secretary of the Ministry of Foreign Affairs (2011–2015), and Ambassador/Permanent Representative of Thailand to the United Nations Office in Geneva (2007–2011).

== Early life and education ==
Sihasak completed his secondary education at Prasarnmit Demonstration School, Srinakharinwirot University. He subsequently pursued higher education at the Faculty of Political Science, Chulalongkorn University, and went on to earn a master's degree in International Relations from the School of Advanced International Studies (SAIS) at Johns Hopkins University in the United States.

== Diplomatic career ==
Sihasak entered Thailand's Ministry of Foreign Affairs in 1979 and held a range of headquarters and overseas roles, including postings in Washington, D.C. and Tokyo, and senior work in the ministry's information and political affairs functions.

From 2002 to 2006, he served as Director-General of the Department of Information and spokesperson of the Ministry of Foreign Affairs, followed by service as Deputy Permanent Secretary for Foreign Affairs (2006–2007).

He was appointed Thailand's Ambassador and Permanent Representative to the United Nations Office at Geneva and other international organizations (2007–2011). During that posting, he was elected President of the United Nations Human Rights Council (2010–2011). In that capacity, Office of the OHCHR press releases document his announcement of appointments of independent experts to UN-mandated investigative mechanisms, including a fact-finding mission (July 2010) and a commission of inquiry (March 2011).

Between 2011 and 2015, he served as Permanent Secretary of the Ministry of Foreign Affairs. Ministry reporting from 2014 described him participating in a UN Human Rights Council session as Permanent Secretary for Foreign Affairs and Acting Foreign Minister.

He later served as Ambassador of Thailand to Japan (2015–2016) and Ambassador of Thailand to France (2016–2018). UNESCO materials identify him as Ambassador and Permanent Delegate of Thailand to UNESCO during his Paris posting.

In 2023–2024, he served as Vice Minister for Foreign Affairs under the appoinment of Minister for Foreign Affairs, Parnpree Bahiddha-nukara. An MFA release described his participation in the OECD Ministerial Council Meeting in Paris in that role in May 2024.

== Political career ==
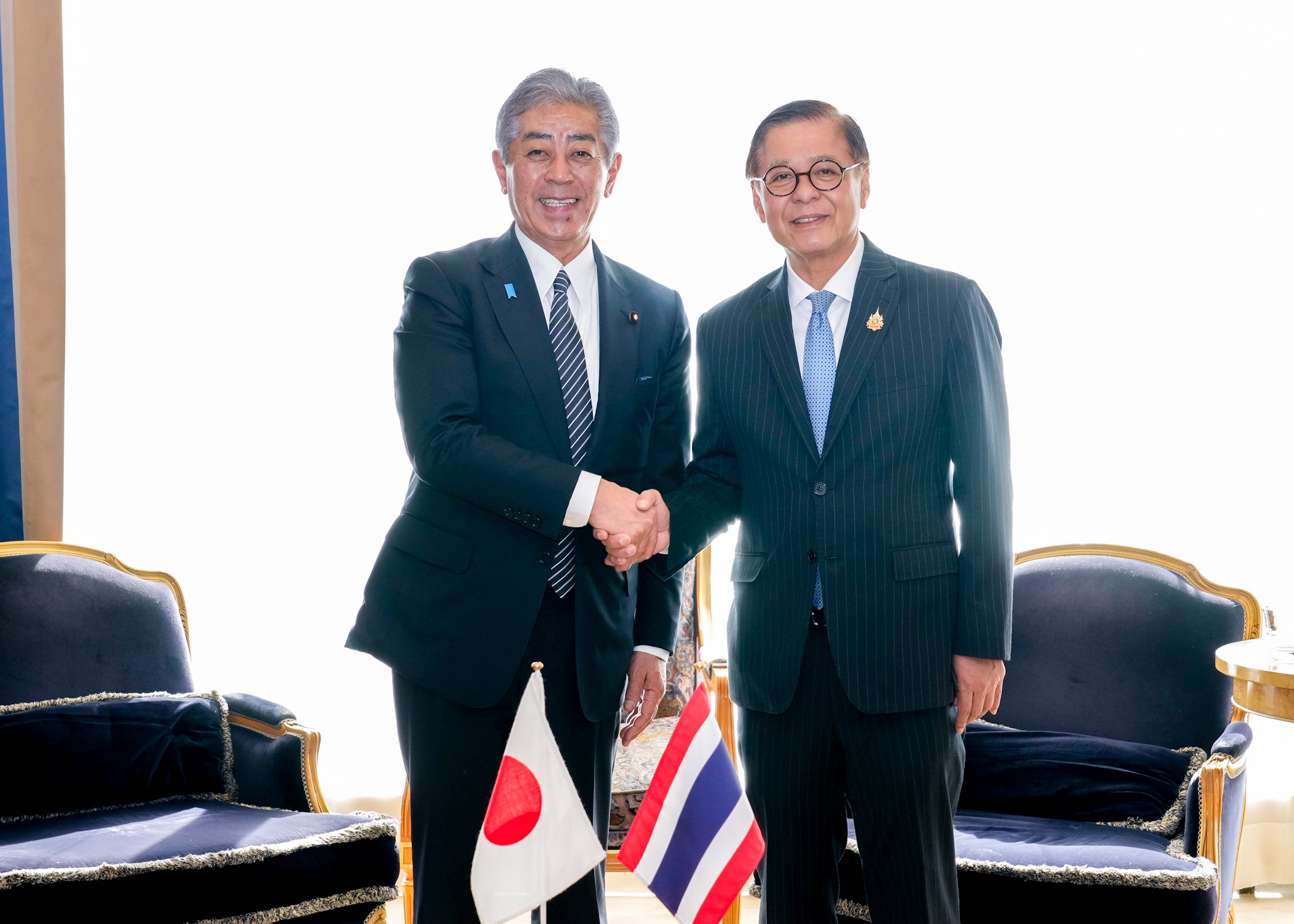
Sihasak meet with Takeshi Iwaya, Minister for Foreign Affairs of Japan in 2025

He was appointed Minister of Foreign Affairs on 19 September 2025. Reuters reported his selection as foreign minister in September 2025 as part of incoming cabinet appointments under Prime Minister Anutin Charnvirakul, subject to formal approval procedures. As minister, Thai government public-relations reporting described his participation in the 2026 World Economic Forum in Davos in January 2026.

In the 2026 general election, Sihasak was selected by the Bhumjaithai Party as one of its candidates for prime minister. Following Bhumjaithai's victory in the election, he was re-appointed as Foreign Minister and received an additional appointment as Deputy Prime Minister.

== Recognition ==
The Ministry of Foreign Affairs' official biography states that he later received Thailand's National Human Rights Award in connection with his human-rights work during his career. The National Human Rights Commission of Thailand lists him among awardees under "Human Rights Award (Male)" for Year 2011.

== Honors and awards ==
- Commander of the Order of Legion of Honour
- Grand Officer of the Order of the Rising Sun
- Grand Officer of the Order of Orange-Nassau
