= Yodchanan Wongsawat =

Thai academic and politician (born 1979)

Professor Yodchanan Wongsawat TM ChCh
- ยศชนัน วงศ์สวัสดิ์
- Yodchanan in 2026

Deputy Prime Minister of Thailand
- Incumbent
- Assumed office 30 March 2026
- Prime Minister: Anutin Charnvirakul

Minister of Higher Education, Science, Research and Innovation
- Incumbent
- Assumed office 30 March 2026
- Prime Minister: Anutin Charnvirakul
- Preceded by: Surasak Phancharoenworakul

Member of the House of Representatives
- Incumbent
- Assumed office 8 February 2026
- Constituency: Party-list

Personal details
- Born: 8 October 1979 (age 46) Mueang Chiang Mai,Chiang Mai,Thailand
- Party: Pheu Thai
- Parent: Somchai Wongsawat (father)
- Relatives: Thaksin Shinawatra (uncle); Yingluck Shinawatra (aunt); Paetongtarn Shinawatra (first cousin)
- Education: Thammasat University (BS); University of Texas at Arlington (MS, PhD)

Academic work
- Discipline: Biomedical engineering
- Main interests: Brain–computer interface Neural engineering

Yodchanan Wongsawat (Thai: ยศชนัน วงศ์สวัสดิ์, RTGS: Yotchanan Wongsawat; born 8 October 1979) is a Thai academic and politician who has served as Deputy Prime Minister of Thailand and Minister of Higher Education, Science, Research and Innovation since March 2026. He has been a professor of biomedical engineering at Mahidol University since 2025. From 2018 to 2025, he was an associate professor at the university. He specializes in brain–computer interfaces and neural engineering.

In the 2014 general election, Wongsawat was elected member of the House of Representatives according to preliminary results; the election was invalidated as a result of the ongoing political crisis and he was not seated. He was the lead candidate of the Pheu Thai Party for prime minister of Thailand in the 2026 general election. Wongsawat is related to several former prime ministers; he is the son of Somchai Wongsawat, the nephew of Thaksin and Yingluck Shinawatra, and the first cousin of Paetongtarn Shinawatra.

== Early life and education ==
Yodchanan was born in Chiang Mai on 8 October 1979 to Somchai Wongsawat and Yaowapa Wongsawat. Yaowapa is the sister of Thaksin Shinawatra and Yodchanan is hence connected to the Shinawatra family of Thailand. He completed a bachelor's degree in electrical engineering in 2001 from Thammasat University in Bangkok. Afterwards, Yodchanan studied at the University of Texas at Arlington in the United States, where he completed his master's in 2003 and doctorate in 2007.

== Academic career ==
In May 2008, Yochanan joined the Faculty of Engineering at Mahidol University where he taught biomedical engineering. His research revolved around technology linking human brains with computers in fields such as robotic limbs. For his research, Yodchanan has received several academic rewards and honours. This includes National Research Council of Thailand’s 2016 Inventor Award. Through his research, Yodchanan also owns several patents for medical devices such as a brain-controlled wheelchair, a brain-activated alarm clock and a device that allows a person to control electrical appliances through signals from the brain.

== Political career ==
Under the government of his cousin, Paetongtarn, Yodchanan was appointed to the Management and Human Resources Committee of the Digital Government Development Agency in January 2025.

== Royal decorations ==
- 2021 – Commander (Third Class) Order of the Crown of Thailand
- 2013– Companion (Fourth Class) Order of the White Elephant
