= New Party (Thailand) =

Political party in Thailand

New Party พรรคใหม่
- Abbreviation: N
- Leader: Kriditaj Sangthanyothin
- Secretary-General: Supree Saengsawang
- Founded: 17 May 2022; 3 years ago
- Headquarters: 76/61, Moo 1, Soi Tha It, Ratchaphruek Road, Tha It Subdistrict, Pak Kret District, Nonthaburi Province
- Colours: Blue
- House of Representatives: 1 / 500

New Party (Thai: พรรคใหม่, RTGS: Phak Mai; abbreviated: N) is a political party in Thailand that was officially founded on May 17, 2022. The party secured one seat in the 2023 general election and is currently led by Kriditaj Sangthayothin.

== History ==
New Party was founded following a joint meeting held on July 12, 2020, to establish a new political party. It was officially registered under the Political Parties Act of 2017, with registration number 5/2565, on May 17, 2022. The party is named "New Party," abbreviated as "N." Its logo prominently features a "fist."

The leader of New Party is Mr. Kritdithat Sangthanyothin, and the secretary-general is Mr. Supree Sangsawang.

== Political role ==
=== 2023 general election ===
In the 2023 general election, the New Party fielded four district candidates and ten party-list candidates, receiving the number 1 position on the ballot. The party's policies included eliminating corruption, reforming all government agencies, abolishing the credit bureau, limiting land ownership rights, providing housing and healthcare benefits, and creating a youth fund to support new graduates in starting their careers. The party successfully secured one seat in the party-list election.

After the election, the New Party initially announced its intention to participate in forming a government with the Move Forward Party, which had won the highest number of seats in the House of Representatives. However, the New Party later withdrew from the coalition due to backlash from supporters of the Move Forward Party on social media, with the slogan "I don’t want the New Party." This decision followed the revelation that one of the party's executive members had shared a video discussing the refusal to amend laws related to the crime of insulting the monarchy.

On October 5, 2024, Mr. Kritdithat Sangthanyothin, a party-list Member of Parliament, was expelled from the New Party. He subsequently joined the Kla Tham Party, explaining that he felt politically isolated within the New Party and had no platform. He further stated that, after discussions with Captain Thammanat Prompao, he decided to join the Kla Tham Party.

== Elections ==
=== General election results ===
| Election | Total seats won | All votes | Popular votes | Seat change | Outcome of election | Election leader |
|---|---|---|---|---|---|---|
| 2023 | 1 / 500 | 249,731 | 0.67% | ▲1 seat | Junior partner in governing coalition | Kriditaj Sangthayothin |
| 2026 | 1 / 500 | 892 | 0.00% | - | Junior partner in governing coalition | Kriditaj Sangthayothin |
