= New Alternative Party (Thailand) =

Thai political party

New Alternative Party พรรคทางเลือกใหม่
- Leader: Rachen Tagunviang
- Secretary-General: Pairoj Kratumthonglert
- Founded: March 2, 2018
- Headquarters: 122/151 Moo 5 Tambon Maha Sawat, Bang Kruai, Nonthaburi, Thailand
- Colors: Blue
- House of Representatives: 1 / 500

The New Alternative Party (Thai: พรรคทางเลือกใหม่, RTGS: Phak Thang Lueak Mai) is a political party in Thailand founded on March 2, 2018 by Rachen Tagunviang, who is the party's chairman, and Pairoj Kathumtonglert, who is its secretary-general. The party is based in Nonthaburi Province.
