= United Thai Nation Party =

Thai political party

United Thai Nation Party พรรครวมไทยสร้างชาติ
- Abbreviation: UTN
- Leader: Pirapan Salirathavibhaga
- Secretary-General: Akanat Promphan
- Spokesperson: Akkradech Wongpitakroj
- Founder: Seksakon Atthawong
- Founded: 31 March 2021; 5 years ago
- Split from: Palang Pracharath Party; Democrat Party (Partial)
- Preceded by: Terd Thai Party
- Headquarters: 35/3 Soi Aree 5 Phahonyothin Rd. Phaya Thai, Bangkok
- Membership (2023): 50,652
- Ideology: Thai nationalism; Ultraconservatism; Militarism; Monarchism; Authoritarianism
- Political position: Far-right
- Colours: Blue
- Slogan: “เด็ดขาดแก้วิกฤต พลิกโฉมประเทศ” (Decisive in solving crises, transform the country’s image)
- Anthem: "เพลงประจำพรรครวมไทยสร้างชาติ" ('Hymn of United Thai Nation Party')
- House of Representatives: 2 / 500

Website
- unitedthaination.or.th

The United Thai Nation Party (Thai: พรรครวมไทยสร้างชาติ, RTGS: Ruam Thai Sang Chat) is an ultra-conservative nationalist Thai political party founded on 31 March 2021 by Seksakon Atthawong, the former Deputy Minister to Prime Minister Prayut Chan-o-cha. In the run-up to the 2023 general election, then Prime Minister Prayut Chan-o-cha joined the party on 9 January 2023 as its candidate for the position. The party emerged as the fifth largest party in Thailand, winning 36 seats in the House of Representatives and 12.55% of the vote. The party has been described as ultra-conservative, pro-military, and monarchist. In 2023, party spokesperson Akkradech Wongpitakroj claimed that the party espoused modern conservatism.

== History ==
=== Founding Period (2021) ===
United Thai Nation Party is a political party, No. 5/2021, registered on 31 March 2021, with Seksakon Atthawong as the founder of the party. There party’s first headquarter was established at 169/98 Serm Sub Building Ratchadapisek Rd., Ratchadaphisek Subdistrict, Din Daeng District, Bangkok.

=== Prime Minister Prayut Chan-o-cha’s decision to join the party ===
On Friday, 23 December 2022, Prime Minister Prayut Chan-o-cha said he had decided to apply for membership of the United Thai Nation Party and was ready to accept the nomination from party members for another term as prime minister. In the 2023 election, there had been talks with Prawit Wongsuwon, Deputy Prime Minister and leader of the Palang Pracharath Party. It was expected that Prayut will assume the position of party chairman and chairman of the steering committee or the party's superboard as well. In the afternoon of the same day, the Party Executive Committee convened a meeting at the Party headquarters on Soi Aree.

After the announcement of Prayut’s membership, Seksakol Atthawong, leader of the Terd Thai Party, decided to resign from the party, and rejoined the United Thai Nation Party, causing him to leave the position of the Terd Thai Party leader. Chatchawal Kong-udom, the strategy chairman of the Thai Local Power Party, gave an interview that he was preparing to join the United Thai Nation Party, but did not specify whether he would resign from being an MP or not. Then Party Leader Peeraphan, Party Secretary Akanat, Duangrit, the Party Deputy Leader and Party Treasurer Prakromsak held a press conference at the Party Headquarters after the meeting of the Executive Committee.

On 26 December 2022, Chatchawal, together with Noppadol Kaewsupat, another party-list MP from the Thai Local Power Party, submitted a letter of resignation from being an MP and party member by Chatchawal prepare to launch as a member of the United Thai Nation Party. The next day, Chatchawal along with Trairong Suwankiri and Chumpol Kanchana, two former members of the Democrat Party Advisory Council has officially launched as a member of the United Thai Nation Party. On the same day, party leader Peeraphan said Gen Prayut would apply for membership in early 2023 after the New Year.

In early 2023, there was a news that Prayut was preparing to apply for membership in the United Thai Nation Party in mid-January. Prayut gave an interview to reporters on 3 January 2023, stating that he would definitely apply for membership in the United Thai Nation Party, but had not yet set a clear date. It also did not confirm whether he would be the party chairman and chairman of the party's super board according to previous news. On the same day, Picharat Laohaphongchana, party-list MP of the Palang Pracharath Party has submitted a letter of resignation from being an MP and a member of the party to join the United Thai Nation Party.

The next day, there was news that Prayut was preparing to apply for a party membership at the launch event conference on Monday, 9 January 2023 at the Queen Sirikit National Convention Center. Peeraphan said it was likely that Prayut would apply for a party membership that day but still have to wait for a clear conclusion.

=== Prayut and Pirapan as Prime Ministerial candidate ===
Later, on 25 March 2023, at Exhibition Hall 5, Exhibition and Convention Center, IMPACT Muang Thong Thani, the Party organized an event to launch all 400 candidates for the House of Representatives all across the country. This was including the launch of Prayut as the party's prime ministerial candidate in the first order, and Prayut also announced Pirapan Salirathavibhaga as the party's prime ministerial candidate in the second order, resulting in the Party creating 2 candidates for Prime Minister.

Later, on 11 July 2023, Prayut announced his decision to resign from the party and retire from politics.

== General election results ==
Election	Total seats won	Total votes	Share of votes	Seat change	Outcome of election	Election leader
2023	36 / 500	4,673,691	11.90%	▲36 seats	Junior partner in governing coalition	Prayut Chan-o-cha
2026	2 / 500	706,918	2.14%	▼34 seats	Junior partner in governing coalition	Pirapan Salirathavibhaga
