= New Opportunity Party =

New Opportunity Party พรรคโอกาสใหม่
- Leader: Jatuporn Buruspat
- Membership: 48,932
- Ideology: Neoconservatism; Monarchism
- Political position: Centre-right
- Colors: Pink
- Slogan: โอกาสสำหรับคนไทยทุกคน (Opportunity for all Thais)

Website
- www.okardmai.or.th

The New Opportunity Party (Thai: พรรคโอกาสใหม่) is a Thai political party launched in December 2025 by former commerce minister Jatuporn Buruspat.

== Ideology ==
According to public statements by its founder, the party promotes conservative governance and has expressed support for the protection of the Thai monarchy.
