= Paetongtarn cabinet =

Government of Thailand from 2024 to 2025

- 64th Council of Ministers of Thailand
- 2024–2025
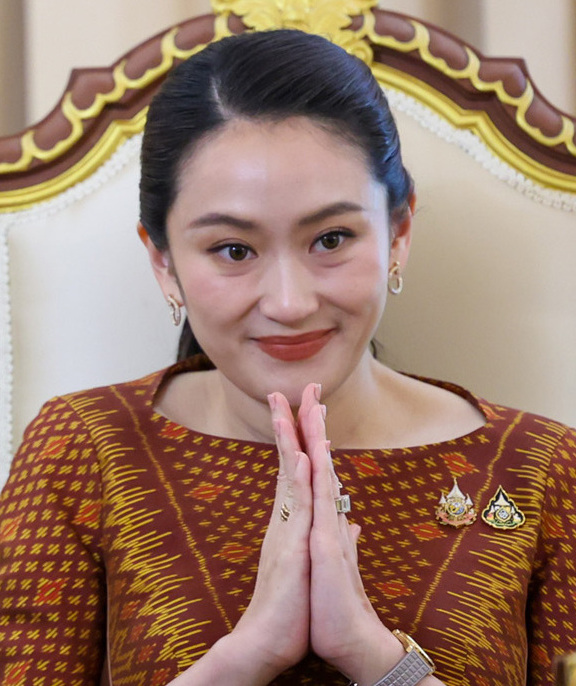
- Paetongtarn Shinawatra in April 2025
- Date formed: 3 September 2024
- Date dissolved: 19 September 2025

People and organisations
- Monarch: Vajiralongkorn
- Prime Minister: Paetongtarn Shinawatra (until 29 August 2025); Suriya Juangroongruangkit (Acting; until 3 July 2025); Phumtham Wechayachai (Acting; since 3 July 2025)
- Deputy Prime Minister: Phumtham Wechayachai; Suriya Juangroongruangkit; Anutin Charnvirakul (2024–2025); Pirapan Salirathavibhaga; Pichai Chunhavajira; Prasert Jantararuangtong
- Member party: Pheu Thai Party; ~~Bhumjaithai Party~~ (2024–2025); United Thai Nation Party; Democrat Party; ~~Palang Pracharath Party~~ (Thammanat's group); Chart Thai Pattana Party; Prachachat Party; Kla Tham Party; Chart Pattana Party; Thai Ruam Palang Party; New Democracy Party; ~~Plung Sungkom Mai Party~~ (2024); ~~Thai Counties~~ (2024); ~~Thai Teachers for People Party~~ (2024)
- Status in legislature: Coalition government
- Opposition party: People's Party; Bhumjaithai Party (from 2025); Palang Pracharath Party; Thai Sang Thai Party; Fair Party; Thai Progress Party; Thai Liberal Party
- Opposition leader: Natthaphong Ruengpanyawut

History
- Legislature term: HoR 26th: 2023–2025
- Predecessor: Srettha cabinet
- Successor: First Anutin cabinet

The Paetongtarn cabinet, formally the 64th Council of Ministers of Thailand (Thai: คณะรัฐมนตรีไทย คณะที่ 64), was the government of Thailand between 3 September 2024 and 19 September 2025. It was formed after the Constitutional Court removed Srettha Thavisin from the premiership in August 2024, and was headed by Paetongtarn Shinawatra, the daughter of former prime minister Thaksin Shinawatra and the youngest person to hold the office.

The cabinet rested on a grand coalition assembled by the Pheu Thai Party that included the conservative parties which had backed the 2014 coup and the military-drafted 2017 constitution, among them Bhumjaithai, the United Thai Nation Party and the Democrat Party. Its program centered on economic stimulus, most prominently a series of 10,000-baht cash handouts, together with a partial increase in the minimum wage, a proposed law to license integrated casino resorts, and the re-tightening of Thailand's cannabis regime.

The government's authority was undermined by the escalating border conflict with Cambodia. On 18 June 2025 Bhumjaithai left the coalition after the leak of a telephone conversation between Paetongtarn and Cambodian Senate President Hun Sen. The Constitutional Court suspended Paetongtarn from duty on 1 July 2025 and dismissed her on 29 August 2025 for a serious breach of ethical standards, a ruling that terminated the cabinet as a whole. Phumtham Wechayachai served as acting prime minister in a caretaker capacity until the First Anutin cabinet took office on 19 September 2025.

== Formation ==
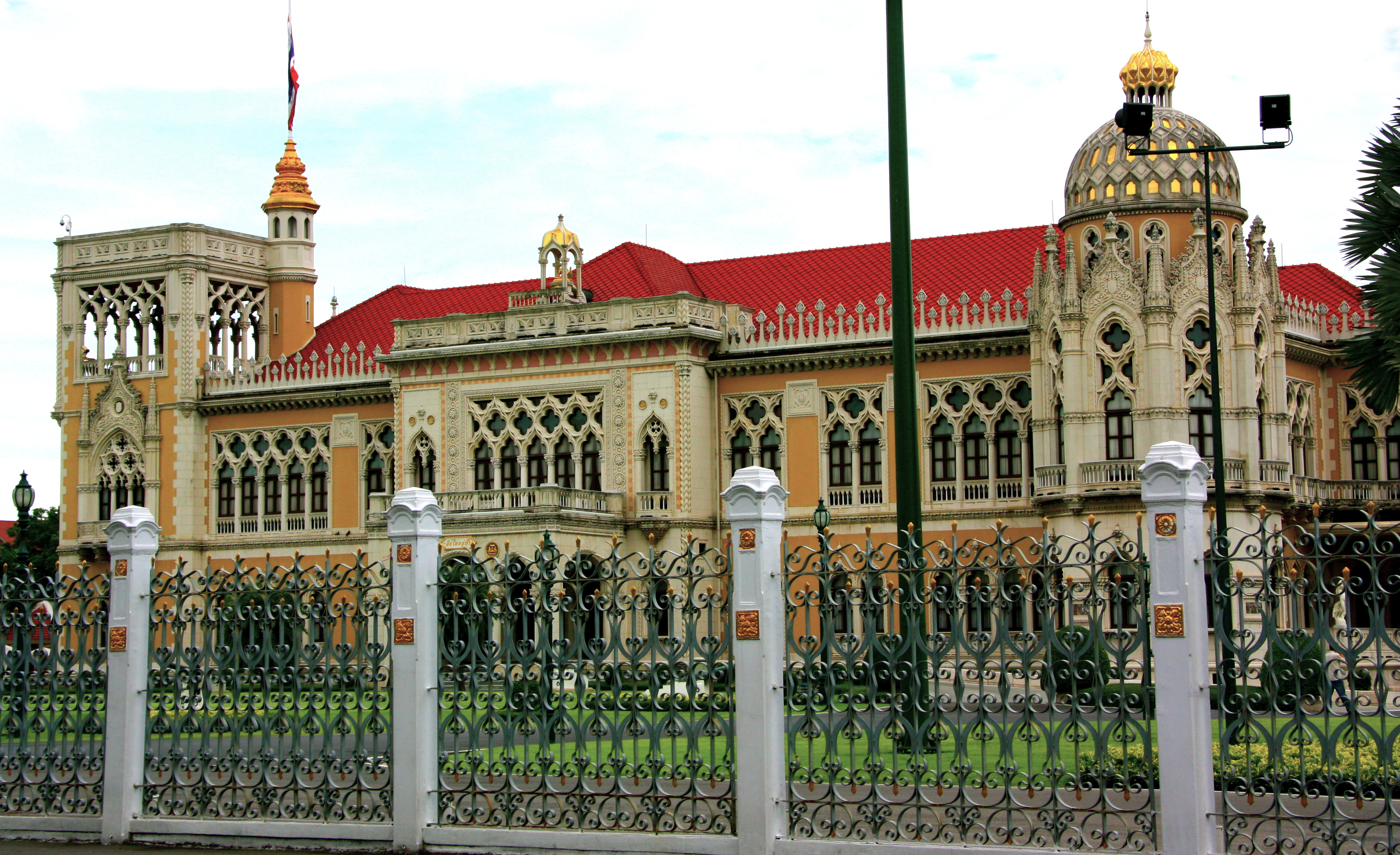
Government House in Bangkok, the seat of the cabinet

On 14 August 2024 the Constitutional Court removed Prime Minister Srettha Thavisin from office for appointing a minister who had served a prison sentence, ending the Srettha cabinet after less than a year. Pheu Thai, which retained the right to nominate a successor, chose Paetongtarn Shinawatra, then 37 years old and the party leader, rather than its remaining reserve candidate Chaikasem Nitisiri.

The outgoing coalition was reconstituted largely intact, with one significant exception. A long-running quarrel inside the Palang Pracharath Party between its leader Prawit Wongsuwon and the faction led by Thamanat Prompow came to a head during the bargaining over portfolios, and Pheu Thai excluded the party from the new government while retaining Thamanat's group, which received three ministerial posts. The faction's members were formally expelled from Palang Pracharath and subsequently regrouped in the Kla Tham Party led by Narumon Pinyosinwat.

Paetongtarn was elected by the House of Representatives on 16 August 2024 with 319 votes and received the royal command of appointment the same day. The royal command appointing the 35 members of the cabinet was dated 3 September 2024 and published in the Royal Gazette the following day, and the prime minister and 35 ministers took the oath of office at Dusit Palace on 6 September 2024.

Paetongtarn delivered the government's policy statement to a joint sitting of parliament on 12 September 2024. The hour-long address set out nine challenges facing the country and ten urgent policies, and gave first place to a program of direct cash transfers worth some US$13.4 billion, alongside measures to support agriculture and tourism and to shield small and medium-sized enterprises from foreign e-commerce competition.

=== Election of the prime minister ===
16 August 2024; Nomination of Paetongtarn Shinawatra (PTP) as Prime Minister; Absolute majority: 248/494
Vote	Parties	Votes
Yes	Pheu Thai Party (139), Bhumjaithai Party (70), Palang Pracharath Party (39), United Thai Nation Party (36), Chart Thai Pattana Party (10), Prachachat Party (8), Thai Sang Thai Party (6), Chart Pattana Party (2), Thai Ruam Palang Party (2), Thai Liberal Party (1), Plung Sungkom Mai (1), Thai Counties (1), New Democracy Party (1), New Party (1), Thai Teachers for People Party (1)	319 / 494
No	People's Party (143), Fair Party (1), Thai Progress Party (1)	145 / 494
Abstain	Democrat Party (25), Pheu Thai Party (1), Prachachat Party (1)	27 / 494
Not voting	Pheu Thai Party (1), Bhumjaithai Party (1), Palang Pracharath Party (1)	3 / 494

== List of ministers ==
Portfolio	Order	Minister	Took office	Left office	Party
Prime Minister	–	Paetongtarn Shinawatra	16 August 2024	29 August 2025 (Note: Suspended: 1 July – 29 August 2025)	Pheu Thai
Prime Minister	–	Suriya Juangroongruangkit (Acting)	1 July 2025	3 July 2025	Pheu Thai
Prime Minister	–	Phumtham Wechayachai (Acting)	3 July 2025	7 September 2025	Pheu Thai
Deputy Prime Ministers	1	Phumtham Wechayachai	3 September 2024	19 September 2025	Pheu Thai
Deputy Prime Ministers	2	Suriya Juangroongruangkit	3 September 2024	19 September 2025	Pheu Thai
Deputy Prime Ministers	3	Pichai Chunhavajira	3 September 2024	19 September 2025	Pheu Thai
Deputy Prime Ministers	*	Anutin Charnvirakul	3 September 2024	19 June 2025	Bhumjaithai
Deputy Prime Ministers	4	Pirapan Salirathavibhaga	3 September 2024	19 September 2025	United Thai Nation
Deputy Prime Ministers	5	Prasert Jantararuangtong	3 September 2024	19 September 2025	Pheu Thai
Office of the Prime Minister	6	Chousak Sirinil	3 September 2024	19 September 2025	Pheu Thai
Office of the Prime Minister	7	Jiraporn Sindhuprai	3 September 2024	19 September 2025	Pheu Thai
Office of the Prime Minister	8	Suchart Tancharoen	30 June 2025	19 September 2025	Pheu Thai
Minister of Defence	*	Phumtham Wechayachai	3 September 2024	30 June 2025	Pheu Thai
Minister of Defence	*	Natthaphon Narkphanit (Acting)	30 June 2025	19 September 2025	Independent (Note: Natthaphon Narkphanit joined the cabinet on behalf of United Thai Nation Party, but is not affiliated with the party.)
Deputy Minister of Defence	9	Natthaphon Narkphanit	3 September 2024	19 September 2025	Independent
Minister of Finance	*	Pichai Chunhavajira	3 September 2024	19 September 2025	Pheu Thai
Deputy Ministers of Finance	10	Julapun Amornvivat	3 September 2024	19 September 2025	Pheu Thai
Deputy Ministers of Finance	11	Paophum Rojanasakul	3 September 2024	19 September 2025	Pheu Thai
Minister of Foreign Affairs	12	Maris Sangiampongsa	3 September 2024	19 September 2025	Pheu Thai
Minister of Tourism and Sports	13	Sorawong Thienthong	3 September 2024	19 September 2025	Pheu Thai
Minister of Social Development and Human Security	14	Varawut Silpa-archa	3 September 2024	19 September 2025	Chart Thai Pattana
Minister of Higher Education, Science, Research and Innovation	*	Supamas Isarabhakdi	3 September 2024	19 June 2025	Bhumjaithai
Minister of Higher Education, Science, Research and Innovation	15	Sudawan Wangsuphakijkosol	30 June 2025	19 September 2025	Pheu Thai
Minister of Agriculture and Cooperatives	*	Narumon Pinyosinwat	3 September 2024	30 June 2025	Kla Tham (Note: Narumon Pinyosinwat joined the cabinet on behalf of Thammanat's group.)
Minister of Agriculture and Cooperatives	16	Atthakorn Sirilatthayakorn	30 June 2025	19 September 2025	Kla Tham
Deputy Ministers of Agriculture and Cooperatives	*	Itthi Sirilatthayakorn	3 September 2024	30 June 2025	Kla Tham (Note: Itthi Sirilatthayakorn joined the cabinet on behalf of Thammanat's group.)
Deputy Ministers of Agriculture and Cooperatives	17	Akara Prompow	3 September 2024	19 September 2025	Kla Tham (Note: Akara Prompow joined the cabinet on behalf of Thammanat's group.)
Minister of Transport	*	Suriya Juangroongruangkit	3 September 2024	19 September 2025	Pheu Thai
Deputy Ministers of Transport	18	Manaporn Charoensri	3 September 2024	19 September 2025	Pheu Thai
Deputy Ministers of Transport	19	Surapong Piyachote	3 September 2024	19 September 2025	Pheu Thai
Minister of Digital Economy and Society	*	Prasert Jantararuangtong	3 September 2024	19 September 2025	Pheu Thai
Minister of Natural Resources and Environment	20	Chalermchai Sri-on	3 September 2024	19 September 2025	Democrat
Minister of Energy	*	Pirapan Salirathavibhaga	3 September 2024	19 September 2025	United Thai Nation
Minister of Commerce	*	Pichai Naripthaphan	3 September 2024	30 June 2025	Pheu Thai
Minister of Commerce	21	Jatuporn Buruspat	30 June 2025	19 September 2025	Independent
Deputy Ministers of Commerce	*	Napinthorn Srisanpang	3 September 2024	19 June 2025	Bhumjaithai
Deputy Ministers of Commerce	22	Suchart Chomklin	3 September 2024	19 September 2025	United Thai Nation
Deputy Ministers of Commerce	23	Chantawit Tantasith	30 June 2025	19 September 2025	Independent
Minister of Interior	*	Anutin Charnvirakul	3 September 2024	19 June 2025	Bhumjaithai
Minister of Interior	*	Phumtham Wechayachai	30 June 2025	19 September 2025	Pheu Thai
Deputy Ministers of Interior	*	Songsak Thongsri	3 September 2024	19 June 2025	Bhumjaithai
Deputy Ministers of Interior	*	Sabida Thaiseth	3 September 2024	19 June 2025	Bhumjaithai
Deputy Ministers of Interior	24	Theerarat Samrejvanich	3 September 2024	19 September 2025	Pheu Thai
Deputy Ministers of Interior	25	Dech-it Khaothong	3 September 2024	19 September 2025	Democrat
Minister of Justice	26	Tawee Sodsong	3 September 2024	19 September 2025	Prachachart
Minister of Labour	*	Phipat Ratchakitprakarn	3 September 2024	19 June 2025	Bhumjaithai
Minister of Labour	27	Pongkawin Juangroongruangkit	30 June 2025	19 September 2025	Pheu Thai
Minister of Culture	*	Sudawan Wangsuphakijkosol	3 September 2024	30 June 2025	Pheu Thai
Minister of Culture	*	Paetongtarn Shinawatra	30 June 2025	29 August 2025	Pheu Thai
Minister of Culture	*	Suchart Tancharoen (Acting)	29 August 2025	19 September 2025	Pheu Thai
Minister of Education	*	Permpoon Chidchob	3 September 2024	19 June 2025	Bhumjaithai
Minister of Education	28	Narumon Pinyosinwat	30 June 2025	19 September 2025	Kla Tham
Deputy Minister of Education	*	Surasak Phanchareonworakul	3 September 2024	19 June 2025	Bhumjaithai
Deputy Minister of Education	29	Linthiporn Warinwatchararoj	30 June 2025	19 September 2025	Pheu Thai
Deputy Minister of Education	30	Tewan Liptapallop	30 June 2025	19 September 2025	Chart Pattana
Minister of Public Health	31	Somsak Thepsuthin	3 September 2024	19 September 2025	Pheu Thai
Deputy Minister of Public Health	*	Dech-it Khaothong	3 September 2024	30 June 2025	Democrat
Deputy Minister of Public Health	32	Anucha Sasomsap	30 June 2025	19 September 2025	Chart Thai Pattana
Deputy Minister of Public Health	33	Chaichana Dechdecho	30 June 2025	19 September 2025	Democrat
Minister of Industry	34	Akanat Promphan	3 September 2024	19 September 2025	United Thai Nation

== Policy ==
=== Economy ===
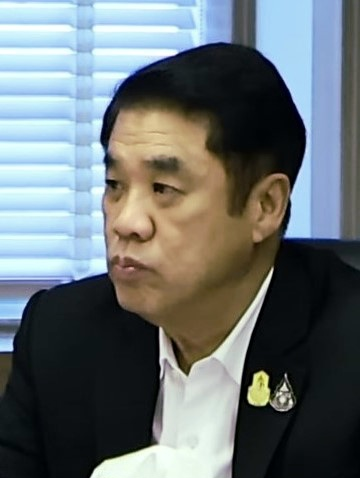
Suriya Juangroongruangkit, deputy prime minister and minister of transport, who served as acting prime minister for two days in July 2025

The government's flagship economic measure was the digital wallet stimulus, a scheme carried forward from the Srettha cabinet under which 10,000 baht was to be distributed to eligible adults. The single universal payment originally promised never arrived. Instead, it was delivered as a series of tranches, each aimed at a different group. A first phase in late September 2024 paid state welfare cardholders and people with disabilities in cash; a second phase in late January 2025 extended the payment to recipients aged 60 and over. In March 2025 the cabinet approved a third phase covering about 2.7 million people aged 16 to 20, to be paid for the first time through the digital wallet application itself, allowing the state to observe spending patterns. On 19 May 2025 the government's economic development committee shelved that phase. The Ministry of Finance insisted the money had been deferred, not canceled, and part of the remaining budget went instead to infrastructure and other stimulus.

External conditions worsened throughout the year. Once the United States confirmed a 19 percent tariff on Thai exports, the National Economic and Social Development Council cut its forecast for the year from a range of 2.3 to 3.3 percent down to 1.3 to 2.3 percent. High household debt and a strong baht weighed on growth as well.

The government also began to tackle household debt. On 11 December 2024 the cabinet approved "Khun Su, Rao Chuay" (Thai: คุณสู้ เราช่วย, "You fight, we help"), a restructuring program drawn up with the Ministry of Finance, the Bank of Thailand and the Thai Bankers' Association. Targeting approximately 1.9 million retail and small-business borrowers, its principal measure, "Jai Trong Kong Sap", cut installments and suspended interest for three years on housing, vehicle and SME loans so that borrowers could keep the assets pledged against them. Registration opened the next day and was later extended to 30 April 2025. A second phase widening the eligibility criteria was approved in 2025.

The cabinet's second and last budget was approved in draft at 3,780,600 million baht, an increase of 0.7 percent on the previous year. While the prime minister was suspended, parliament was responsible for managing the budget's proceedings. The House took its second and third readings between 13 and 15 August 2025 and passed the bill by 257 votes to 230. The twenty-seven vote margin revealed the fragility of the coalition government's majority after Bhumjaithai's exit. Subsequently, the Senate considered it on 25 and 26 August. The Budget Act came into force on 1 October 2025, by which time the cabinet had been dismissed already.

=== Labor ===
Pheu Thai had campaigned in 2023 on a national daily minimum wage of 400 baht. What the tripartite Wage Committee approved on 23 December 2024, to take effect on 1 January 2025, was an average rise of 2.9 percent spread across seventeen separate rates running from 337 to 400 baht. The full 400-baht rate applied only in Phuket, Chachoengsao, Chonburi and Rayong and on Ko Samui, with Bangkok and its surrounding provinces set at 372 baht.

=== Gambling and entertainment complexes ===
In January 2025 the cabinet approved a draft Entertainment Complex Bill that would have licensed integrated resorts containing casinos alongside hotels, convention centers, shopping malls and theme parks. It was one of Pheu Thai's principal legislative projects. Paetongtarn defended it by insisting that gambling was to be only a small part of what the complexes contained. Opposition came from inside the House, where Bhumjaithai was strongly opposed to it, and from the public, and consideration of the bill was repeatedly delayed. On 8 July 2025, days after Paetongtarn's suspension, the cabinet withdrew it altogether. Deputy Finance Minister Julapun Amornvivat blamed the political situation and the reshuffle, and said the government meant to bring it back at a better moment.

=== Cannabis ===
The decriminalization of cannabis in 2022 had been Bhumjaithai's policy. Its swift reversal came once the party had left the coalition. On 24 June 2025 Minister of Public Health Somsak Thepsuthin signed a notification on controlled herbs restricting cannabis flower to medical use, ending over-the-counter recreational sales. Purchases required a prescription valid for up to thirty days from a licensed practitioner, and breaches were punishable by up to one year in prison or a fine of 20,000 baht.

=== Health and social policy ===
The universal healthcare scheme reached its final stage of expansion under this cabinet. Paetongtarn launched the fourth phase of "30 baht treatment anywhere" (Thai: 30 บาทรักษาทุกที่) on 25 December 2024. This added the remaining 31 provinces so that from 1 January 2025 a patient could obtain treatment at any participating facility in all 77 provinces with a national identity card alone.

The Marriage Equality Act had been passed and given royal assent under the Srettha cabinet, but its 120-day delay meant that it entered into force on 23 January 2025 under the Paetongtarn administration. Thailand became the first country in Southeast Asia to recognize same-sex marriage, with full rights of adoption and inheritance. Hundreds of couples registered on the first day, with more than 200 couples doing so at a mass ceremony held at a Bangkok shopping center.

=== Disaster response ===
On 28 March 2025 the magnitude 7.7 earthquake in the Sagaing Region of Myanmar was felt strongly in Bangkok and brought down the State Audit Office tower then under construction in Chatuchak district, killing dozens of workers. Paetongtarn visited the site that evening and ordered a panel of experts to report on the causes within a week. The quake also exposed the state of the national alert system. At a meeting on 29 March the prime minister told the Department of Disaster Prevention and Mitigation and the National Broadcasting and Telecommunications Commission to fix the delays that had left emergency SMS warnings arriving late or not at all. Official investigations later linked the collapse to faulty design of the shear walls around the lift and stair cores and to poor quality concrete.

=== Foreign policy ===
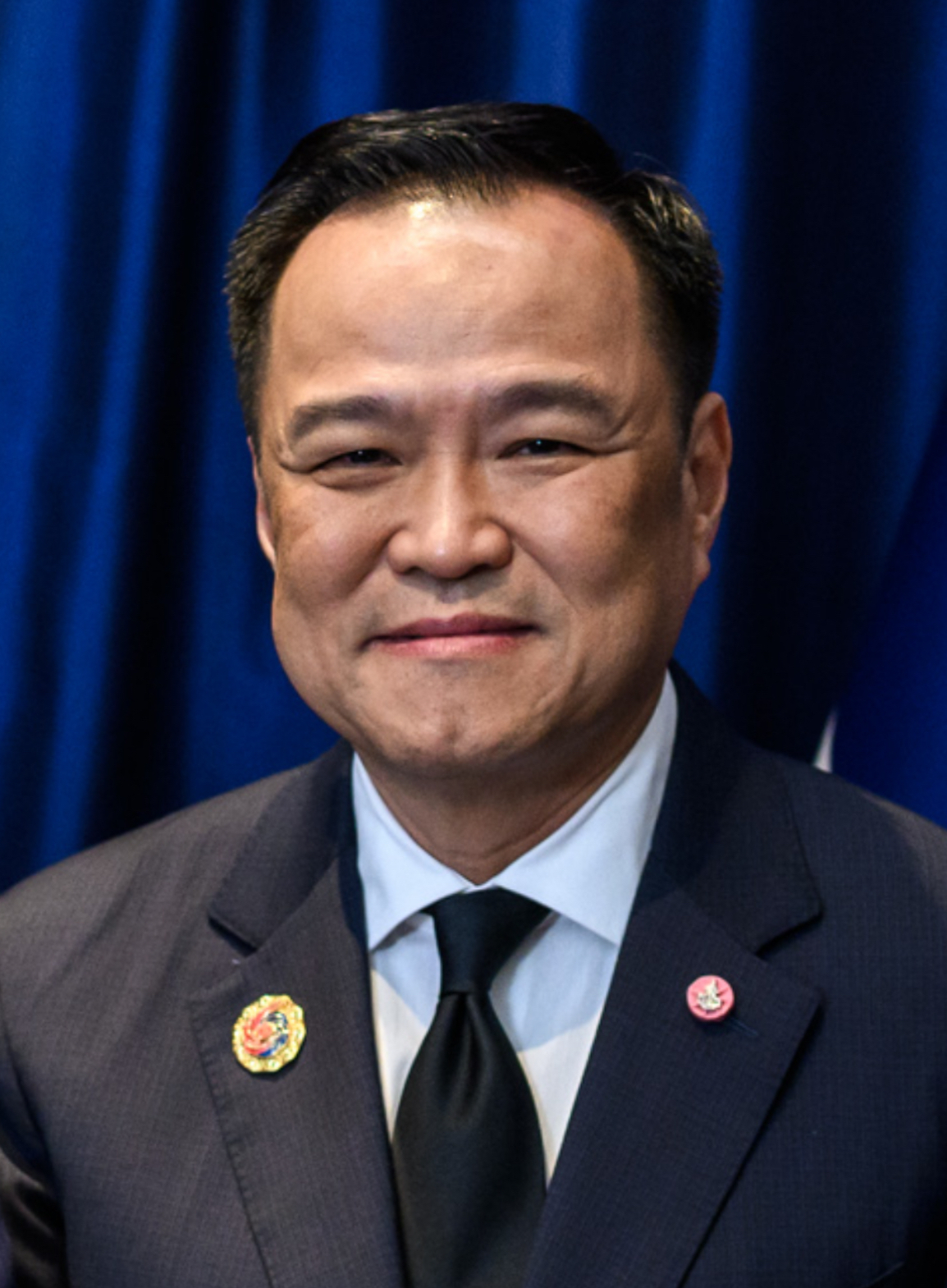
Anutin Charnvirakul, deputy prime minister and minister of the interior until Bhumjaithai left the coalition in June 2025

==== Uyghur deportations ====
On 27 February 2025 Thailand deported 40 Uyghur men to China. All had fled Xinjiang in 2014, part of a group of more than 300 picked up that year, and had sat in Thai immigration detention ever since. An unscheduled China Southern Airlines flight took them out of Don Mueang airport in the morning, landing in Kashgar. The United Nations, the United States and France criticized the removal as a breach of the principle of non-refoulement, and Human Rights Watch called it a forcible return. Paetongtarn said the repatriation had followed Thai law and international process and denied that it formed part of any trade arrangement with China, stating that "people are not commodities".

==== Scam centers on the Myanmar border ====
Under Chinese pressure to act against the transnational fraud compounds operating in Myanmar's border towns, the government cut cross-border utilities in February 2025. Minister of the Interior Anutin Charnvirakul announced that the Provincial Electricity Authority had suspended supply at five connection points from Chiang Rai to Tak and Kanchanaburi, affecting Myawaddy, Tachileik and Payathonzu. This proved ineffective as the compounds could draw from generators and external supplies. The government also legislated an emergency decree on measures for the prevention and suppression of technology crime (No. 2), published in the Royal Gazette on 12 April 2025. Coming into force the next day, it made banks, mobile operators and social media platforms share liability for losses suffered by victims of online fraud unless they could show they had met the preventive standards set by the regulators.

==== Cambodia ====
Relations with Cambodia deteriorated sharply in 2025. In May, Cambodian troops were reported to have dug in and fortified positions in the disputed Chong Bok area of Ubon Ratchathani province; on 28 May a clash there killed a Cambodian soldier. Paetongtarn played it down. She had spoken with Prime Minister Hun Manet, she said, and both governments would work to keep it from happening again.

Fighting resumed on 24 July 2025, after Paetongtarn's suspension, in the heaviest confrontation between the two states in more than a decade. Over five days of artillery exchanges and air strikes, at least 38 people were killed and more than 300,000 residents on both sides of the border were displaced. A ceasefire brokered by Malaysian Prime Minister Anwar Ibrahim as chair of ASEAN, with the involvement of the United States and China, took effect on 28 July 2025, with the caretaker government represented by acting prime minister Phumtham Wechayachai.

== 2025 political crisis and dissolution ==
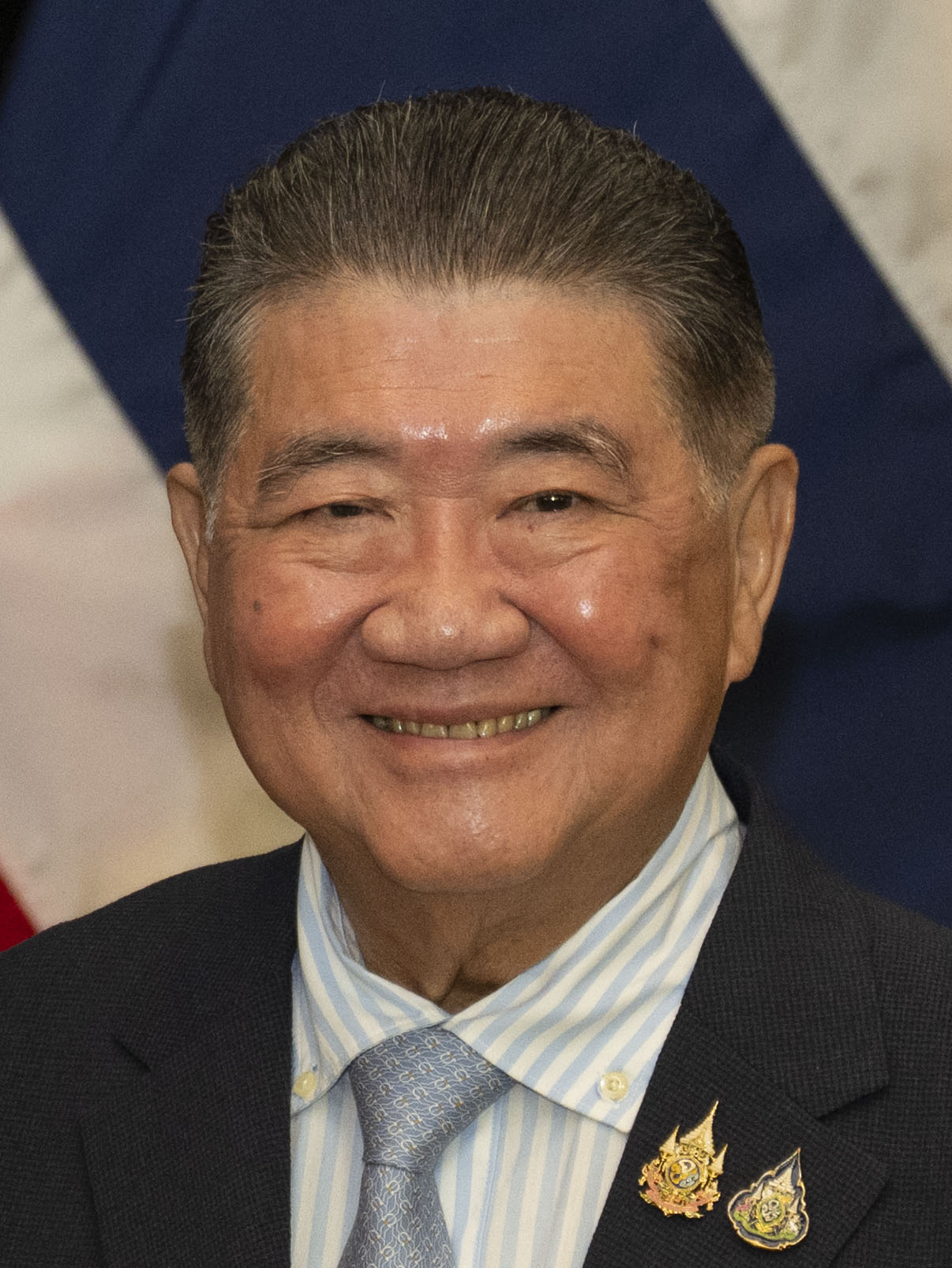
Phumtham Wechayachai, acting prime minister from 3 July 2025 and caretaker prime minister after Paetongtarn's dismissal

=== No-confidence motion ===
The opposition People's Party tabled a censure motion against Paetongtarn alone in March 2025. After a two-day debate in which the opposition attacked her handling of the economy and national security and argued that her father directed the government, she survived the vote on 26 March by 319 votes to 162, with 7 abstentions.

=== Collapse of the coalition ===
On 18 June 2025 the Bhumjaithai Party announced its withdrawal from the coalition following the leak of a telephone conversation of 15 June between Paetongtarn and Hun Sen, the president of the Cambodian Senate, in which she addressed him as "uncle" and appeared to disparage the commander of the Thai Second Army Area, Lieutenant General Boonsin Padklang. The party said its ministers had submitted their resignations with effect from the following day. The sudden exit of the coalition's second-largest party left the government with only a slim majority in the House. Public opinion swung heavily against the government and Paetongtarn after the leak. A NIDA survey published at the end of June put support for Paetongtarn as preferred prime minister at 9.20 percent, down from 30.9 percent in the first quarter, with Pheu Thai falling from 28.05 to 11.52 percent.

=== Cabinet reshuffle ===
On 23 June 2025 the government confirmed that it would proceed with a cabinet reshuffle to fill the posts vacated by Bhumjaithai. The royal command was dated 30 June and appeared in the Royal Gazette on 1 July, bringing nine new ministers into the cabinet. Paetongtarn additionally took the culture portfolio for herself, which had the effect of preserving her a place in the cabinet should she be suspended as prime minister.

=== Suspension of the prime minister ===
On 1 July 2025 the Constitutional Court voted 7 to 2 to suspend Paetongtarn from her duties as prime minister pending its decision on a petition brought by 36 senators, who accused her of dishonesty and of a serious breach of ethical standards in the conversation with Hun Sen.

On 3 July 2025 acting prime minister Suriya Juangroongruangkit led the reshuffled cabinet in taking the oath of office before the king. His tenure as acting prime minister lasted about one day, as a special cabinet meeting was held the same day. The ministers designated Phumtham Wechayachai as acting prime minister, because he now ranked first among the deputy prime ministers.

=== Dismissal and caretaker period ===
The Constitutional Court delivered its judgment on 29 August 2025, ruling by six votes to three that Paetongtarn's ministerial status had ended. The court held that a minister must display manifest honesty and integrity to a standard higher than that required of members of parliament. It accepted the recording as admissible evidence, as Paetongtarn had not disputed its contents. It also found that she had knowledge that Hun Sen held no official position in the Cambodian government. Her chosen method of negotiation, which the court characterized as an appeal for Hun Sen's sympathy rather than a negotiating technique, was held to have served Cambodian rather than Thai interests, to have damaged her standing and to have caused a loss of public confidence, amounting to a serious breach of ethical standards. The court dated the termination of her office to 1 July 2025, when it had ordered her to cease her duties, and ruled that the entire cabinet was dismissed with her.

A special cabinet meeting on 30 August confirmed Phumtham as acting prime minister for the caretaker period. Parliament elected Anutin Charnvirakul as prime minister on 5 September 2025 by 311 votes to 152 for the Pheu Thai candidate Chaikasem Nitisiri, after Bhumjaithai secured the support of the People's Party in exchange for a constitutional referendum and a general election within four months. The caretaker cabinet left office when the First Anutin cabinet was sworn in on 19 September 2025.

== Assessment ==
Analysts have generally judged the cabinet a failure in policy terms. Writing for ISEAS, Eugene Mark argued that Pheu Thai had achieved no significant policy success across either the Srettha or the Paetongtarn administration. The "grand compromise" struck with the parties associated with the 2014 coup, in his account, produced a coalition strong enough to pass budgets but brittle enough to hollow out the party's identity as a vehicle of redistribution and democratic reform. The International Crisis Group treated the Cambodia dispute as the immediate trigger of the political disarray that followed, arguing that it handed nationalist sentiment and the military the means to narrow an elected government's room for maneuver.

The cabinet was also the third headed by a Pheu Thai or allied prime minister to be ended by a ruling of the Constitutional Court, after those of Yingluck Shinawatra in 2014 and Srettha Thavisin in 2024.
