= Srettha cabinet =

Government of Thailand (2023–2024)

- 63rd Council of Ministers of Thailand
- 2023–2024
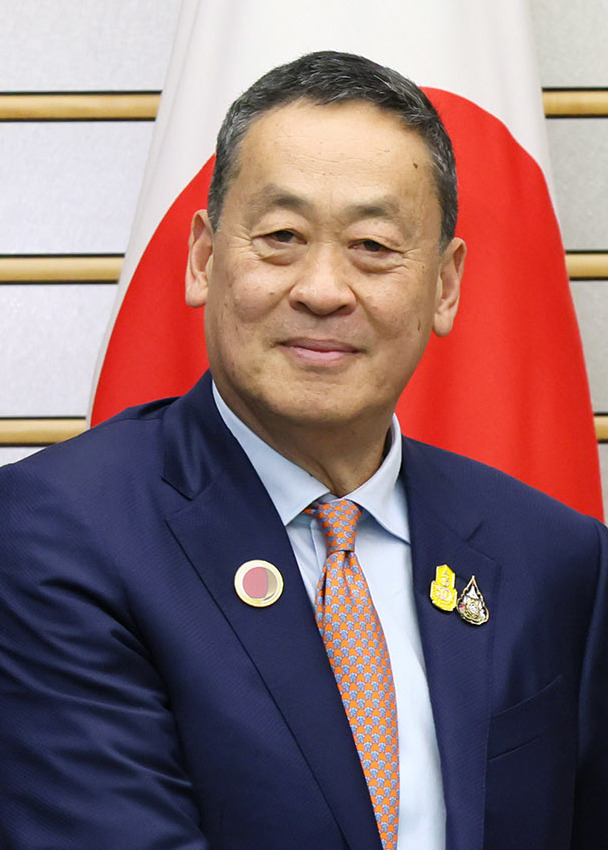
- Date formed: 1 September 2023
- Date dissolved: 3 September 2024

People and organisations
- Monarch: Vajiralongkorn
- Prime Minister: Srettha Thavisin (3 September 2023–14 August 2024); Phumtham Wechayachai (Acting; 14 August 2024 – 16 August 2024)
- Deputy Prime Minister: First appointment (1 September 2023): Phumtham Wechayachai; Somsak Thepsuthin (until 27 April 2024); Parnpree Bahiddha-nukara (until 27 April 2024); Anutin Charnvirakul; Patcharawat Wongsuwan; Pirapan Salirathavibhaga; Second appointment (27 April 2024): Suriya Juangroongruangkit; Pichai Chunhavajira
- No. of ministers: 35
- Member party: Pheu Thai Party; Bhumjaithai Party; Palang Pracharath Party; United Thai Nation Party; Chart Thai Pattana Party; Prachachat Party; Pheu Thai Ruam Palang; Chart Pattana Party; Thai Liberal Party; Plung Sungkom Mai Party; Thai Counties
- Status in legislature: Coalition government
- Opposition party: People's Party; Democrat Party; Thai Sang Thai Party; Fair Party; New Democracy Party; New Party; Thai Teachers for People Party; Thai Progress Party; ~~Move Forward Party~~
- Opposition leader: Chaithawat Tulathon (until 7 August 2024)

History
- Election: 2023 general election
- Legislature term: HoR 26th: 2023–2025
- Budget: 2024 budget
- Predecessor: Second Prayut cabinet
- Successor: Paetongtarn cabinet

The Srettha cabinet, formally known as the 63rd Council of Ministers (คณะรัฐมนตรีไทย คณะที่ 63), was formed after the May 2023 Thai general election. The coalition is led by Pheu Thai Party which nominated Srettha Thavisin as its candidate for prime minister

Srettha was elected as prime minister on 22 August 2023 and received the appointment from the royal command the same day.

The cabinet was officially sworn into office by King Rama X on 5 September 2023.

Srettha was dismissed from office by the Constitutional Court on 14 August 2024, which entailed the dismissal of the entire cabinet as well.

== Election of the prime minister ==
22 August 2023; Nomination of Srettha Thavisin (PTP) as Prime Minister; Absolute majority: 375/748
Vote	Parties	Votes
Yes	Senators (152), Pheu Thai Party (140), Bhumjaithai Party (71), Palang Pracharath Party (39), United Thai Nation Party (36), Democrat Party (16), Chart Thai Pattana Party (10), Prachachat Party (8), Chart Pattana Party (2), Thai Ruam Palang Party (2), Thai Liberal Party (1), Plung Sungkom Mai (1), Thai Counties (1), New Democracy Party (1), New Party (1), Thai Teachers for People Party (1)	482 / 748
No	Move Forward Party (149), Senators (13), Democrat Party (2), Fair Party (1)	165 / 748
Abstain	Senators (68), Democrat Party (6), Thai Sang Thai Party (6), Prachachat Party (1)	81 / 748
Not voting	Pheu Thai Party (1), Senators (16), Palang Pracharath Party (1), Move Forward Party (1), Democrat Party (1)	20 / 748

== List of ministers ==
Portfolio	Order	Minister	Took office	Left office	Party
Prime Minister	*	Srettha Thavisin	22 August 2023	14 August 2024	Pheu Thai
Prime Minister		Phumtham Wechayachai (Acting)	14 August 2024	16 August 2024	Pheu Thai
Deputy Prime Ministers	1	Phumtham Wechayachai	1 September 2023	3 September 2024	Pheu Thai
Deputy Prime Ministers		Somsak Thepsuthin	1 September 2023	27 April 2024	Pheu Thai
Deputy Prime Ministers		Parnpree Bahiddha-nukara	1 September 2023	27 April 2024	Pheu Thai
Deputy Prime Ministers	2	Suriya Juangroongruangkit	27 April 2024	3 September 2024	Pheu Thai
Deputy Prime Ministers	3	Pichai Chunhavajira	27 April 2024	3 September 2024	Independent (Note: Pichai Chunhavajira joined the cabinet on behalf of Pheu Thai Party, but is not affiliated with the party.)
Deputy Prime Ministers	4	Anutin Charnvirakul	1 September 2023	3 September 2024	Bhumjaithai
Deputy Prime Ministers	5	Patcharawat Wongsuwon	1 September 2023	3 September 2024	Palang Pracharath
Deputy Prime Ministers	6	Pirapan Salirathavibhaga	1 September 2023	3 September 2024	United Thai Nation
Office of the Prime Minister		Puangpet Chunlaiad	1 September 2023	27 April 2024	Pheu Thai
Office of the Prime Minister	7	Jakkapong Sangmanee	27 April 2024	3 September 2024	Pheu Thai
Office of the Prime Minister		Pichit Chuenban	27 April 2024	21 May 2024	Pheu Thai
Office of the Prime Minister	8	Jiraporn Sindhuprai	27 April 2024	3 September 2024	Pheu Thai
Minister of Defence	9	Sutin Klungsang	1 September 2023	3 September 2024	Pheu Thai
Minister of Finance		Srettha Thavisin	1 September 2023	27 April 2024	Pheu Thai
Minister of Finance	10	Pichai Chunhavajira	27 April 2024	3 September 2024	Independent
Deputy Ministers of Finance		Krisada Chinavicharana	1 September 2023	8 May 2024	Independent (Note: Krisada Chinavicharana joined the cabinet on behalf of United Thai Nation Party, but is not affiliated with the party.)
Deputy Ministers of Finance	11	Julapun Amornvivat	1 September 2023	3 September 2024	Pheu Thai
Deputy Ministers of Finance	12	Paophum Rojanasakul	27 April 2024	3 September 2024	Pheu Thai
Minister of Foreign Affairs		Parnpree Bahiddha-nukara	1 September 2023	28 April 2024	Pheu Thai
Minister of Foreign Affairs	13	Maris Sangiampongsa	30 April 2024	3 September 2024	Independent (Note: Maris Sangiampongsa joined the cabinet on behalf of Pheu Thai Party, but is not affiliated with the party.)
Deputy Minister of Foreign Affairs		Jakkapong Sangmanee	1 September 2023	27 April 2024	Pheu Thai
Minister of Tourism and Sports		Sudawan Wangsuphakijkosol	1 September 2023	27 April 2024	Pheu Thai
Minister of Tourism and Sports	14	Sermsak Pongpanich	27 April 2024	3 September 2024	Pheu Thai
Minister of Social Development and Human Security	15	Varawut Silpa-archa	1 September 2023	3 September 2024	Chart Thai Pattana
Minister of Higher Education, Science, Research and Innovation	16	Supamas Isarabhakdi	1 September 2023	3 September 2024	Bhumjaithai
Minister of Agriculture and Cooperatives	17	Thamanat Prompow	1 September 2023	3 September 2024	Palang Pracharath
Deputy Ministers of Agriculture and Cooperatives		Chaiya Phromma	1 September 2023	27 April 2024	Pheu Thai
Deputy Ministers of Agriculture and Cooperatives		Anucha Nakasai	1 September 2023	27 April 2024	United Thai Nation
Deputy Ministers of Agriculture and Cooperatives	18	Atthakorn Sirilatthayakorn	27 April 2024	3 September 2024	Palang Pracharath
Minister of Transport	*	Suriya Juangroongruangkit	1 September 2023	3 September 2024	Pheu Thai
Deputy Ministers of Transport	19	Monporn Charoensri	1 September 2023	3 September 2024	Pheu Thai
Deputy Ministers of Transport	20	Surapong Piyachote	1 September 2023	3 September 2024	Pheu Thai
Minister of Digital Economy and Society	21	Prasert Jantararuangtong	1 September 2023	3 September 2024	Pheu Thai
Minister of Natural Resources and Environment	*	Patcharawat Wongsuwan	1 September 2023	3 September 2024	Palang Pracharath
Minister of Energy	*	Pirapan Salirathavibhaga	1 September 2023	3 September 2024	United Thai Nation
Minister of Commerce	*	Phumtham Wechayachai	1 September 2023	3 September 2024	Pheu Thai
Deputy Ministers of Commerce	22	Napinthorn Srisanpang	1 September 2023	3 September 2024	Bhumjaithai
Deputy Ministers of Commerce	23	Suchart Chomklin	27 April 2024	3 September 2024	United Thai Nation
Minister of Interior	*	Anutin Charnvirakul	1 September 2023	3 September 2024	Bhumjaithai
Deputy Ministers of Interior	24	Songsak Thongsri	1 September 2023	3 September 2024	Bhumjaithai
Deputy Ministers of Interior	25	Chada Thaiseth	1 September 2023	3 September 2024	Bhumjaithai
Deputy Ministers of Interior	26	Kriang Kalptinan	1 September 2023	3 September 2024	Pheu Thai
Minister of Justice	27	Tawee Sodsong	1 September 2023	3 September 2024	Prachachart
Minister of Labour	28	Phipat Ratchakitprakarn	1 September 2023	3 September 2024	Bhumjaithai
Minister of Culture		Sermsak Pongpanich	1 September 2023	27 April 2024	Pheu Thai
Minister of Culture	29	Sudawan Wangsupakitkosol	27 April 2024	3 September 2024	Pheu Thai
Minister of Education	30	Permpoon Chidchob	1 September 2023	3 September 2024	Bhumjaithai
Deputy Minister of Education	31	Surasak Phanchareonworakul	1 September 2023	3 September 2024	Bhumjaithai
Minister of Public Health		Cholnan Srikaew	1 September 2023	27 April 2024	Pheu Thai
Minister of Public Health	32	Somsak Thepsuthin	27 April 2024	3 September 2024	Pheu Thai
Deputy Minister of Public Health	33	Santi Promphat	1 September 2023	3 September 2024	Palang Pracharath
Minister of Industry	34	Pimpatra Wichaikul	1 September 2023	3 September 2024	United Thai Nation
