= Phumtham Wechayachai =

Thai politician (born 1953)

Phumtham Wechayachai MPCh MVM
- ภูมิธรรม เวชยชัย
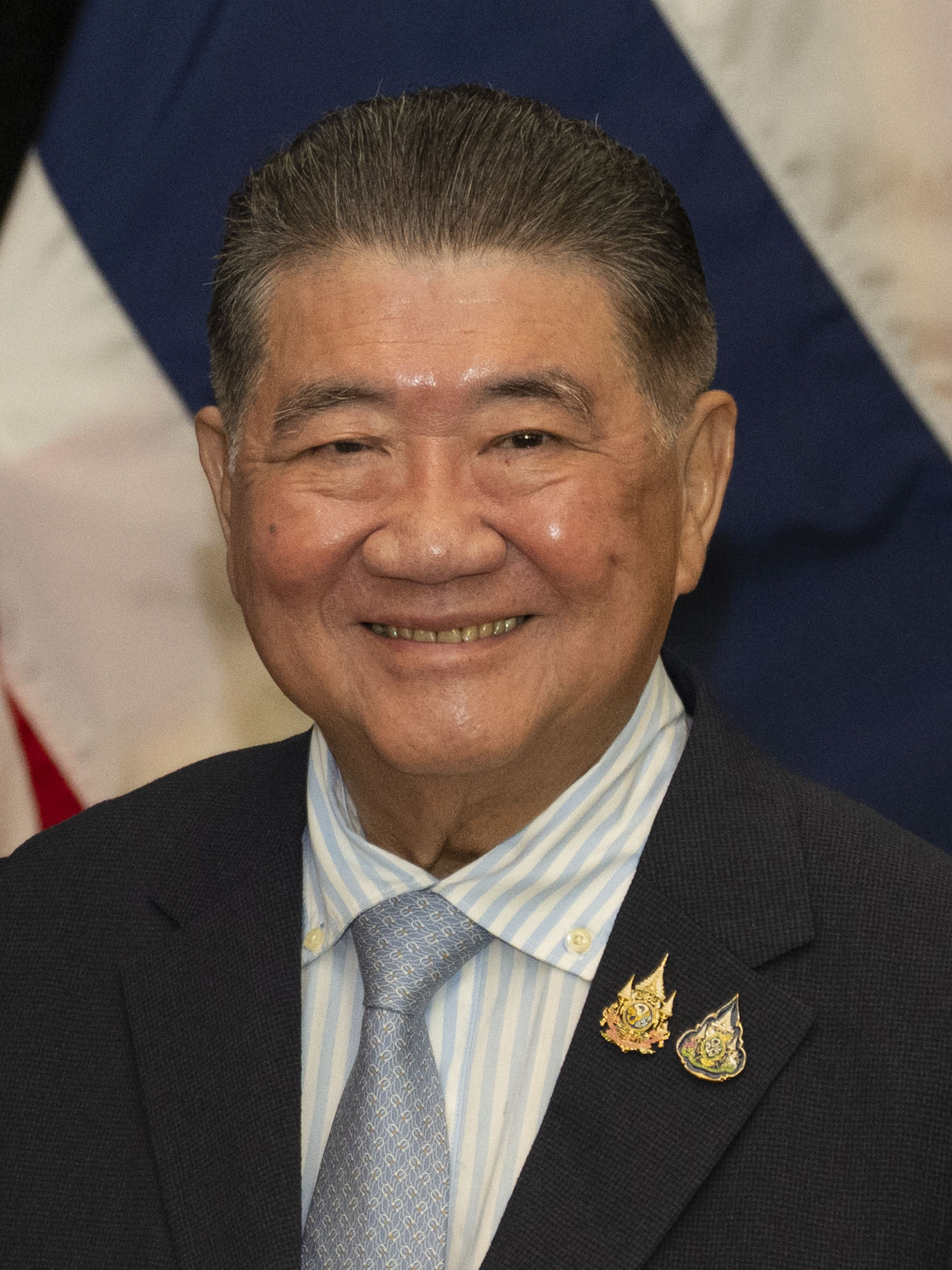
- Phumtham in 2025

Acting Prime Minister of Thailand
- In office 3 July 2025 – 7 September 2025
- Monarch: Vajiralongkorn
- Preceded by: Suriya Juangroongruangkit (acting)
- Succeeded by: Anutin Charnvirakul
- In office 14 August 2024 – 16 August 2024
- Monarch: Vajiralongkorn
- Preceded by: Srettha Thavisin
- Succeeded by: Paetongtarn Shinawatra

Deputy Prime Minister of Thailand
- In office 1 September 2023 – 19 September 2025
- Prime Minister: Srettha Thavisin; Himself (acting); Paetongtarn Shinawatra; Suriya Juangroongruangkit (acting)

Minister of Interior
- In office 30 June 2025 – 19 September 2025
- Prime Minister: Paetongtarn Shinawatra; Suriya Juangroongruangkit (acting); Himself (acting)
- Preceded by: Anutin Charnvirakul
- Succeeded by: Anutin Charnvirakul

Minister of Defence
- In office 3 September 2024 – 30 June 2025
- Prime Minister: Paetongtarn Shinawatra
- Preceded by: Sutin Klungsang
- Succeeded by: Natthaphon Narkphanit

Minister of Commerce
- In office 1 September 2023 – 3 September 2024
- Prime Minister: Srettha Thavisin; Himself (acting)
- Preceded by: Jurin Laksanawisit
- Succeeded by: Pichai Naripthaphan

Minister of Foreign Affairs
- Acting; 28 April 2024 – 30 April 2024
- Prime Minister: Srettha Thavisin
- Preceded by: Parnpree Bahiddha-nukara
- Succeeded by: Maris Sangiampongsa

Deputy Minister of Transport
- In office 11 March 2005 – 19 September 2006
- Prime Minister: Thaksin Shinawatra

Personal details
- Born: 5 December 1953 (age 72) Phasi Charoen, Bangkok, Thailand
- Party: Pheu Thai
- Other political affiliations: Thai Rak Thai (1998–2007); Democrat (1977–1997); CPT (1976–1977)
- Spouse: Apinaya Wechayachai (m. 1980)
- Children: 3
- Education: Chulalongkorn University; National Defence College
- Occupation: Businessman; politician
- Nickname: Uan (อ้วน)

Military service
- Allegiance: Thailand
- Branch/service: Volunteer Defense Corps
- Years of service: 1969–2004
- Rank: VDC Lieutenant Colonel
- Battles/wars: Communist insurgency in Thailand

Phumtham Wechayachai MPCh MVM (Thai: ภูมิธรรม เวชยชัย, RTGS: Phumtham Wetchayachai, pronounced [pʰūːm.tʰām wêːt.tɕʰá.já.tɕʰāj]; born 5 December 1953) is a Thai politician who served as the acting Prime Minister of Thailand from the suspension of Paetongtarn Shinawatra in July to the appointment of Anutin Charnvirakul in September 2025 as well as from 14 to 16 August 2024 from the dismissal of Srettha Thavisin to the appointment of Paetongtarn. He served as Deputy Prime Minister and Minister of Commerce of Thailand in the Srettha cabinet, and in the Paetongtarn cabinet he served as Minister of Defence. He is the concurrent Deputy Prime Minister and Minister of Interior.

== Early life and career ==
Phumtham was born on 5 December 1953 in Phra Nakhon district, Bangkok. He graduated high school from Taweethapisek School. Pursuing higher education, Phumtham obtained a Bachelor of Political Science from Faculty of Political Science, Chulalongkorn University in 1975, followed by a Master of Political Science in 1984.

Phumtham was chief executive officer of Shin Corporation from 1997 to 1998.

== Political career ==
Phumtham was a member of the Communist Party of Thailand from 1977 to 1978. He was later a member of the Democrat Party from 1978 until 1997, joining Thai Rak Thai (TRT).

Phumtham worked as an advisor to the Prime Minister Thaksin Shinawatra before being appointed Deputy Minister of Transport in the Thaksin II cabinet.

Thaksin's government was overthrown by the Royal Thai Army on 19 November 2006 in a coup. The TRT was dissolved and 111 party executives, including Phumtham, were banned from holding political office for the next five years in 2007. Despite this, Phumtham remained loyal to Thaksin and his parties by working behind the scenes as a media strategist. When the ban expired in April 2012, he spoke of his desire for national reconciliation and his willingness to work for the Pheu Thai Party (PTP), TRT's eventual successor. The end of the political ban for the 111 former executives placed pressure on Prime Minister Yingluck Shinawatra to shuffle her cabinet to make room. Although Phumtham was tipped for a possible post as Minister of Interior, he did not receive one and instead served as the party's Director and then its Secretary-General and Deputy Leader from 2012 to 2013.

== Srettha and Paetongtarn governments ==
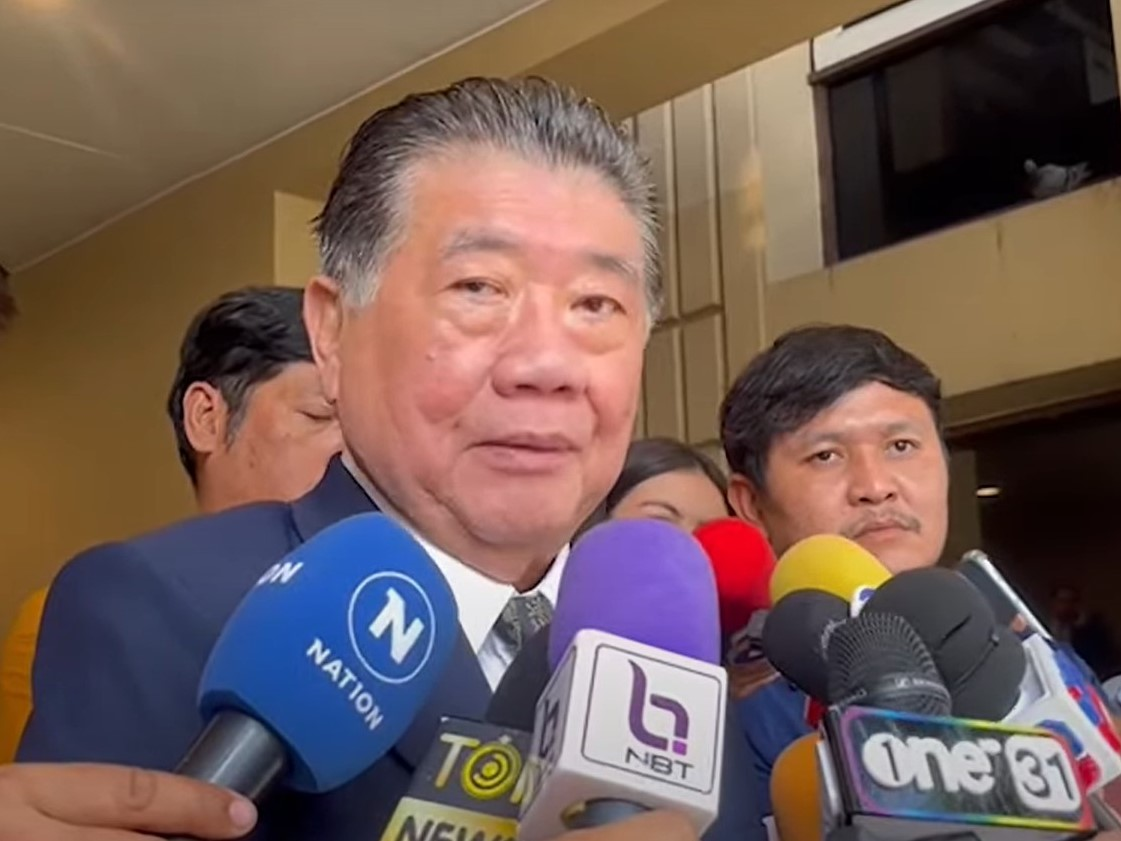
Phumtham as Deputy Prime Minister in 2023

Following the 2023 Thai general election, Phumtham was appointed Deputy Prime Minister and Minister of Commerce in the Srettha cabinet.

On 28 April 2024, Phumtham was appointed Acting Minister of Foreign Affairs after the resignation of Parnpree Bahiddha-nukara. He was succeeded on 30 April by Maris Sangiampongsa.

In March 2025, Phumtham held a meeting with Xinjiang Party Secretary Ma Xingrui regarding Thailand's deportation of 40 Uyghurs to China.

== Acting premierships (2024, 2025) ==
On 14 August 2024, Phumtham was appointed acting Prime Minister of Thailand following the dismissal of Srettha Thavisin by the Constitutional Court.

Following the suspension of Paetongtarn Shinawatra as prime minister by the Constitutional Court, Phumtham, who was her deputy prime minister, became the interim prime minister in July 2025.

As prime minister, Phumtham presided over an escalation of the 2025 Cambodia–Thailand border conflict in July. After Paetongtarn was removed as prime minister by the Constitutional Court on 29 August, Phumtham submitted a decree to dissolve parliament on 3 September amid debate over whether a caretaker government can do so. The decree was rejected by the Privy Council of Thailand the next day.

== Royal decorations ==
- 2025 – Knight Grand Cross of the Most Exalted Order of the White Elephant
- 2024 – Knight Grand Cordon (Special Class) The Most Noble Order of the Crown of Thailand
