= Pichai Chunhavajira =

Thai politician

- พิชัย ชุณหวชิร
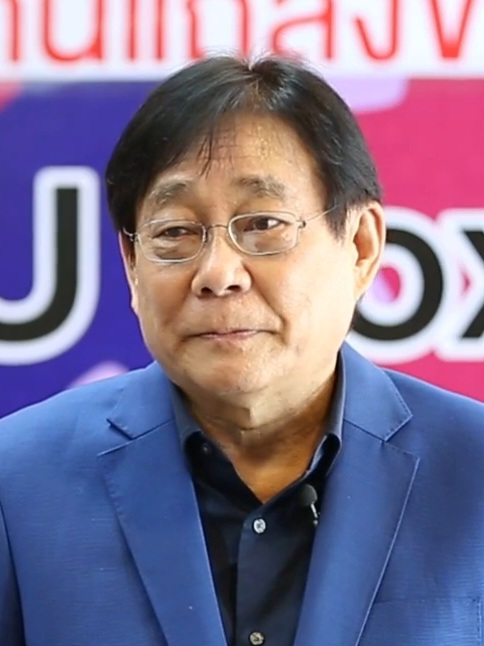
- Pichai in 2016

Deputy Prime Minister of Thailand
- In office 27 April 2024 – 19 September 2025
- Prime Minister: Srettha Thavisin; Phumtham Wechayachai (acting); Paetongtarn Shinawatra; Suriya Juangroongruangkit (acting)

Minister of Finance
- In office 27 April 2024 – 19 September 2025
- Prime Minister: Srettha Thavisin; Phumtham Wechayachai (acting); Paetongtarn Shinawatra; Suriya Juangroongruangkit (acting)
- Preceded by: Srettha Thavisin
- Succeeded by: Ekniti Nitithanprapas

Personal details
- Born: 15 February 1949 (age 77) Ayutthaya, Phra Nakhon Si Ayutthaya, Thailand
- Party: Pheu Thai (2024–present)
- Spouse: Suthasinee Chunhavajira
- Education: Thammasat University (AB); Indiana University of Pennsylvania (MBA)
- Occupation: Businessperson; Politician
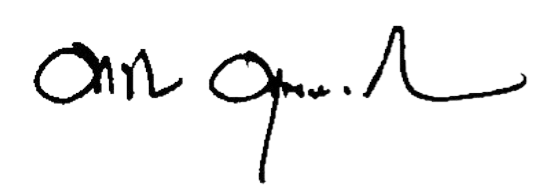
- Signature

Pichai Chunhavajira (Thai: พิชัย ชุณหวชิร, RTGS: Phichai Chunhawit) is a Thai politician who has served as Deputy Prime Minister of Thailand and Ministry of Finance since 2024. Prior to his political career, he served as the chair of the board of Bangchak Corporation from 2012 and as chairman of the Stock Exchange of Thailand in 2024.

== Early life and education ==
Pichai Chunhavajira, commonly known by his nickname "Bank," earned a Bachelor's degree in Commerce and Accounting from Thammasat University. He later pursued a Master's degree in Business Administration from Indiana University of Pennsylvania, USA.

== Career ==
=== Early career ===
From 2001 to 2013, Pichai Chunhavajira served as a director at PTT Exploration and Production Public Company Limited.

From 2012 until April 25, 2024, he held the position of Chairman of the Board at Bangchak Corporation Public Company Limited.

Between 2014 and 2017, Pichai was a director at the Bank of Thailand.

From February 5 to April 25, 2024, he served as Chairman of the Board of the Stock Exchange of Thailand.

=== Political career ===
==== Prime Minister's Advisor ====
On September 15, 2023, Prime Minister Settha Thavisin signed a decree appointing Pichai Chunhavajira as the Prime Minister's Advisor.

==== Deputy Prime Minister and Minister of Finance ====
Later, on April 27, 2024, His Majesty the King graciously appointed Pichai as Deputy Prime Minister, replacing Panpree Phahitthanukorn, who was appointed solely as the Minister of Foreign Affairs. Pichai also assumed the position of Minister of Finance, replacing Settha Thavisin, who became Prime Minister.

== Honors ==
Pichai has received the following royal decorations in the Honours System of Thailand:

- 2005 – Knight Grand Cross of the Most Noble Order of the Crown of Thailand
- 1996 – Companion of the Most Exalted Order of the White Elephant

Preceded by Panpree Phahitthanukorn	Deputy Prime Minister (Cabinet 63); April 27, 2024 – Present	Succeeded by Current Term
Preceded by Settha Thavisin	Minister of Finance (Cabinet 63); April 27, 2024 – Present	Succeeded by Current Term
