= Srettha Thavisin =

Prime Minister of Thailand from 2023 to 2024

Srettha Thavisin MPCh MVM
- เศรษฐา ทวีสิน
- Srettha in 2024

30th Prime Minister of Thailand
- In office 22 August 2023 – 14 August 2024
- Monarch: Vajiralongkorn
- Deputy: See list: Phumtham Wechayachai Somsak Thepsuthin Parnpree Bahiddha-nukara Anutin Charnvirakul Patcharawat Wongsuwan Pirapan Salirathavibhaga Suriya Juangroongruangkit Pichai Chunhavajira
- Preceded by: Prayut Chan-o-cha
- Succeeded by: Phumtham Wechayachai (acting); Paetongtarn Shinawatra

Minister of Finance
- In office 1 September 2023 – 27 April 2024
- Prime Minister: Himself
- Preceded by: Arkhom Termpittayapaisith
- Succeeded by: Pichai Chunhavajira

Personal details
- Born: 15 February 1962 (age 64) Bangkok, Thailand
- Party: Pheu Thai (since 2022)
- Spouse: Pakpilai Paladraksa (m. 1989)
- Children: 3
- Education: University of Massachusetts Amherst (BA); Claremont Graduate University (MBA)
- Occupation: Businessman; politician
- Nickname: Nid (นิด)
- Srettha Thavisin's voice Srettha talks about the digital wallet scheme Recorded 15 November 2023

Srettha Thavisin (Note: Thai: เศรษฐา ทวีสิน, RTGS: Settha Thawisin, pronounced [sèːt.tʰǎː tʰā.wīː.sǐn]) (born 15 February 1962) is a Thai businessman and former politician who served as the 30th prime minister of Thailand from 2023 until his removal from office in 2024. In 1988, he co-founded Sansiri, a venture that propelled him to become a billionaire and a leading real estate tycoon within his country.

During his almost one-year premiership, Srettha oversaw economic policies aimed at stimulating the Thai economy, particularly in Thailand's tourism sector by promoting Thai soft power. He also attempted to implement the digital wallet scheme and his international visits were aimed at attracting investors. Srettha was however labelled as a "puppet" under the control of powers behind the throne by critics. His appointment of Pichit Chuenban to his cabinet led to his dismissal by the courts in August 2024.

== Early life and education ==
Srettha Thavisin, born on 15 February 1962, in Bangkok, Thailand, is the only child of Captain Amnuay Thavisin and Chodchoy Thavisin (née Jutrakul; 1928 - 2024). His family's lineage is connected to five notable Thai Chinese business dynasties: Yip in Tsoi, Chakkapak, Jutrakul, Lamsam, and Buranasiri. When Srettha was three years old in 1966, his father died and Chodchoy raised him as a single mother.

Srettha attended primary school at Prasarnmit Demonstration School of Srinakharinwirot University in Bangkok, then moved to the United States for secondary school. Srettha attended Bloxham School from 1979-1981. He graduated Bachelor of Arts in Economics from the University of Massachusetts Amherst. He further advanced his academic credentials by earning a Master of Business Administration, specialising in Finance, from Claremont Graduate University.

== Business career ==
=== Real estate ===
Srettha began his professional journey at Procter & Gamble as an assistant product manager, a role he held for four years after graduating from Claremont Graduate University in 1986. His entrepreneurial venture took off in 1988 when he co-founded Sansiri, which emerged as one of Thailand's premier real estate developers. His leadership steered the company to successfully develop over 400 residential projects.

In 2013, Prime Minister Yingluck Shinawatra inaugurating the Thailand 2020: Thailand's New Step to the World Expo at the Chaeng Watthana government complex on 12 March. The expo showcased the government's proposed ฿2 trillion investments. Srettha, having inspected a nearby residential project, visited the expo and recommended that his Sansiri colleagues do the same, recognising its potential influence on the real estate sector. Despite public concerns about the project's financing and potential debt implications, Srettha expressed his support. In early 2019, he wrote favourably about the 2020 Expo, which paralleled his advocacy for a digital wallet scheme during his tenure as prime minister.

Srettha's leadership at Sansiri contributed to the company's growth, including during the COVID-19 pandemic. In 2020, he acquired a land parcel at the corner of Sarasin road near Lumphini Park in Bangkok. The purchase costed ฿3.9 million per square wah (approximately 4m²), and is one of the most expensive land purchases in Thai history. Additionally, in the same year, Srettha acquired a 15% stake in XSpring Capital Public Company Limited.

His business career was put on hold when he decided to engage in electoral politics in 2023. Due to regulations in Thai electoral laws prohibiting elected officials from owning or holding shares in companies, Srettha transferred all his shares to his daughter, Chanada Thavisin, on 8 March 2023. This transfer included his shares in Sansiri, representing 4.4% of the company.

=== Business controversies ===
On 17 February 2012, Srettha admitted to having met Prime Minister Yingluck Shinawatra and Deputy Prime Minister Kittiratt Na Ranong at the Four Seasons Hotel where they discussed Thailand's financial situation on 8 February alongside others. The meeting was controversial due to Akeyuth Anchanbutr claiming he was attacked by someone who worked for Thaksin. The meeting would go on to cause a scandal for both Srettha and Yingluck. The Democrat Party, who were the main opposition party, called on a probe into the meeting and Democrat spokesman Chavanond Intarakomalyasut accused Yingluck of telling Srettha her government's flood prevention projects as she was due for a tour of flood affected provinces. Additionally, deputy spokeswoman Mallika Boonmeetrakul called on the National Anti-Corruption Commission (NACC) to investiage Srettha's assets.

On 17 August 2023, Chuwit Kamolvisit filed a complaint with the deputy commissioner-general of police, Surachate Hakparn, seeking an investigation into Srettha's 2019 land purchase in Bangkok. Chuwit accused Srettha and Sansiri of tax evasion. In response to these allegations, Srettha filed a defamation lawsuit for ฿500 million against Chuwit, specifically regarding comments made during a press conference on 3 August.

== Early political career ==
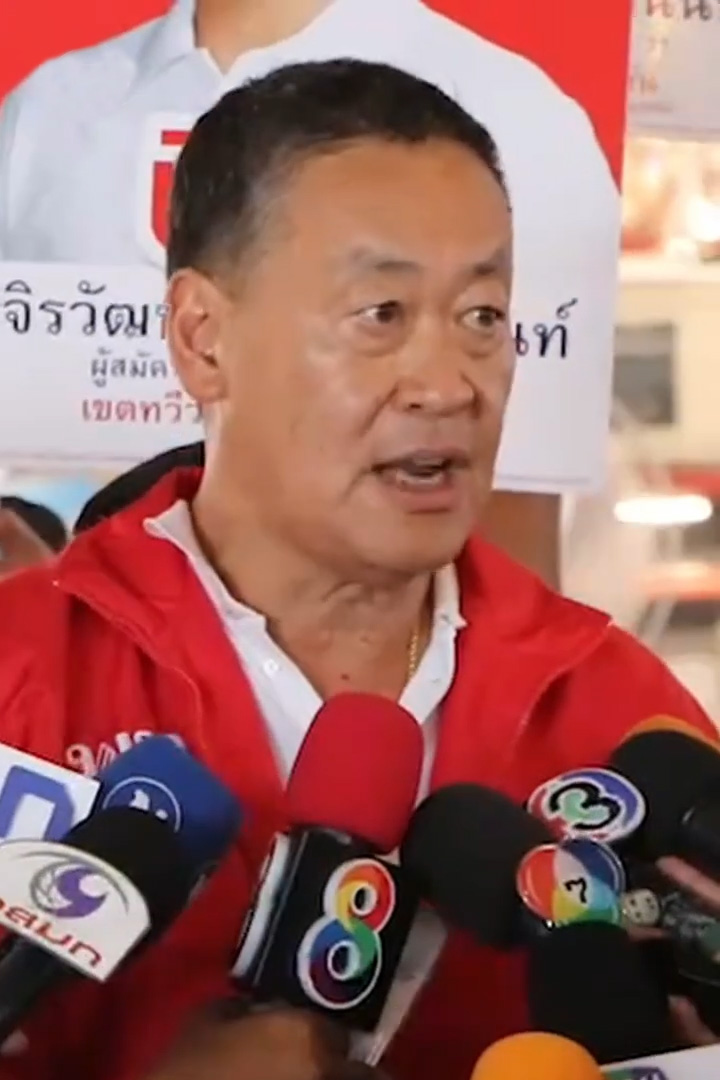
Srettha giving an interview during the campaign in 2023

The 2013–2014 Thai political crisis was a period of significant political unrest in Thailand. During this time, Srettha expressed opposition to the People's Democratic Reform Committee. Following the 2014 coup, he complied with a summons from the National Council for Peace and Order, reporting to the Royal Thai Army auditorium.

Srettha maintained political connections with Thaksin Shinawatra and Yingluck Shinawatra, who have both served as prime ministers. In the 2023 Thai general election, he was amongst the prime ministerial candidates for the Pheu Thai Party. The other candidates from the party included Thaksin's youngest daughter, Paetongtarn Shinawatra, and Chaikasem Nitisiri, a former justice minister.

=== 2023 election ===
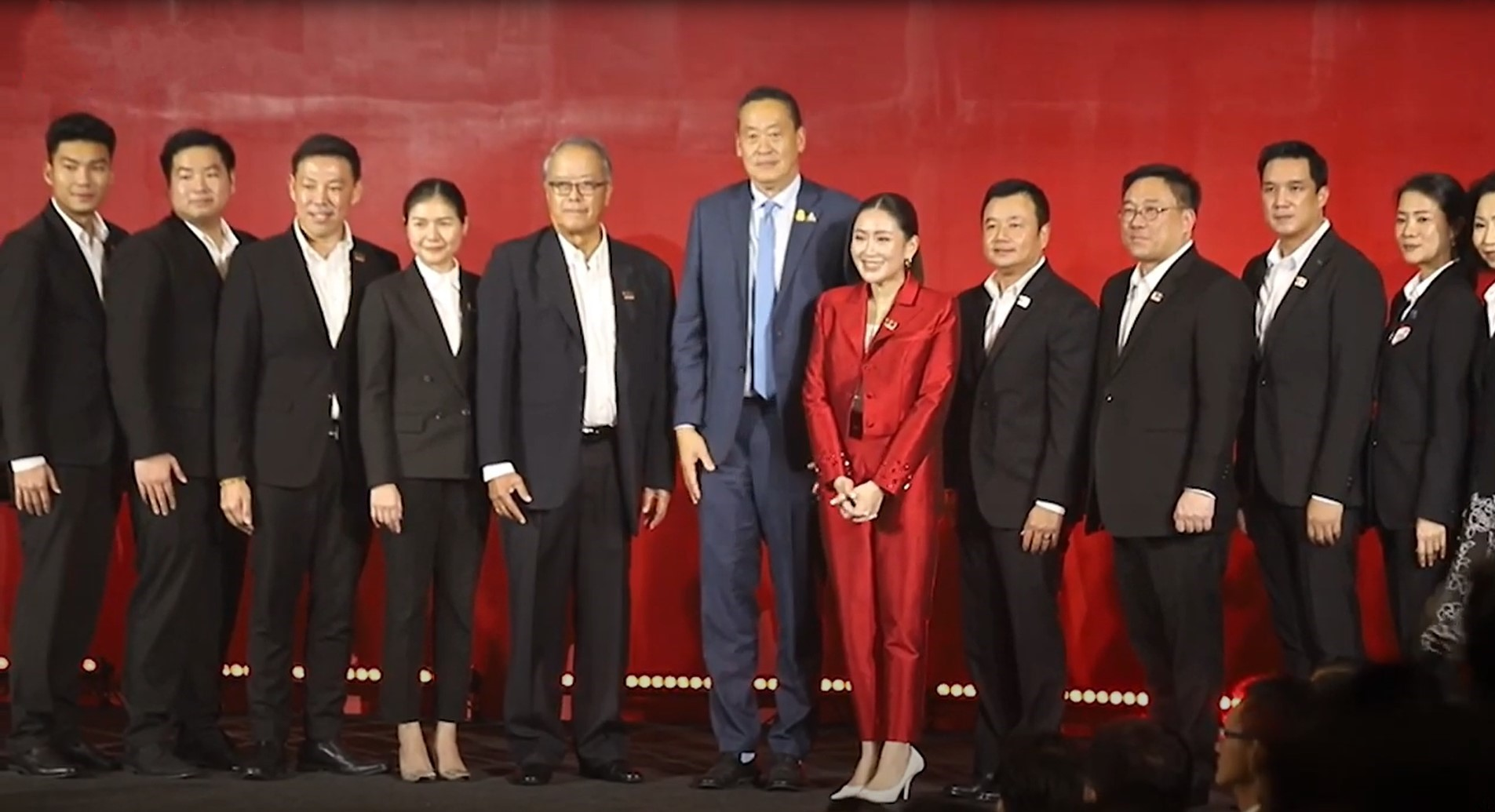
Srettha (center) and Paetongtarn Shinawatra with Pheu Thai Party Executive Committee before 2023 Thai general election

In November, 2022, Srettha announced his intention to join the Pheu Thai Party. During the 2023 Thai general elections, he was named one of the party's three prime ministerial candidates on 5 April 2023. Throughout the campaign, polls frequently showed him trailing behind Paetongtarn in the race for the preferred prime ministerial choice.

Srettha launched his campaign in Bangkok's Khlong Toei district and delivered his inaugural campaign speech in Phichit province. Later, during a speech in Loei province in mid-April, he stated that Pheu Thai would not consider forming a coalition with Palang Pracharath and United Thai Nation, citing their roles in the 2014 coup.

Following the election on 14 May, Pheu Thai emerged as the party with the second-highest number of seats, trailing behind the Move Forward Party. The party then formed a coalition with Move Forward and six other parties. However, in the first round of parliamentary voting on 13 July, Pita Limjaroenrat, Leader of the Move Forward Party, failed to secure enough votes. Subsequently, Pita's second nomination for prime minister was blocked on 19 July on procedural grounds.

After Move Forward failed to form a government, it gave way for Pheu Thai to attempt to form one. This coalition initially only excluded the Move Forward Party, but expanded on 7 August to include the Bhumjaithai Party. In a notable shift from their earlier election stance, the coalition further expanded to incorporate the Palang Pracharath Party and United Thai Nation Party. Srettha described this expansion, which contradicted earlier election promises, as a necessary strategic move.

Subsequently, the Constitutional Court dismissed a petition by the ombudsman questioning the constitutionality of Parliament's rejection of Pita Limjaroenrat. A new round of parliamentary voting was scheduled for 22 August. During this session, Srettha delivered a speech to Parliament, outlining his vision and goals should he become prime minister, and also responded to questions from MPs and senators. His candidacy received support from Thaksin Shinawatra.

Srettha was elected as the 30th Prime Minister of Thailand, following a nomination by the Pheu Thai Party. In a special joint sitting of the House of Representatives and the Senate, he secured 482 votes out of 728.

== Prime Minister of Thailand (2023–2024) ==
=== Government formation ===
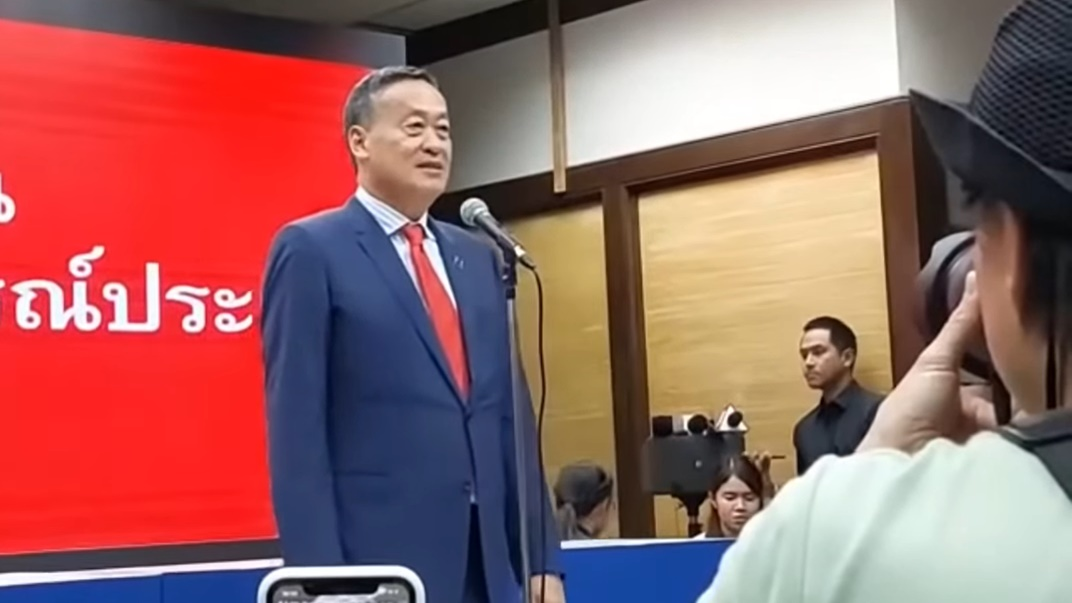
Srettha gives an interview for the Prime Minister nomination in 2023

Srettha was elected as Thailand's next prime minister by a joint sitting of parliament on 22 August 2023. His immediate responsibilities included the formation of a cabinet and the presentation of his policies for the forthcoming four years to parliament. The following day, King Vajiralongkorn officially appointed Srettha as the 30th Prime Minister of Thailand.

On 5 September, Srettha was sworn in as prime minister and minister of finance by the King. The ceremony took place at the Amphorn Sathan Residential Hall in Dusit Palace, Bangkok. The new cabinet formed by Srettha was composed of 34 ministers representing six parties within the governing coalition. This included several ministers who had served under the previous administration of Prayut Chan-o-cha.

Srettha stepped down as finance minister in April 2024 during a cabinet reshuffle. He was succeeded by his advisor and former energy executive, Pichai Chunhavajira.

=== Domestic affairs ===
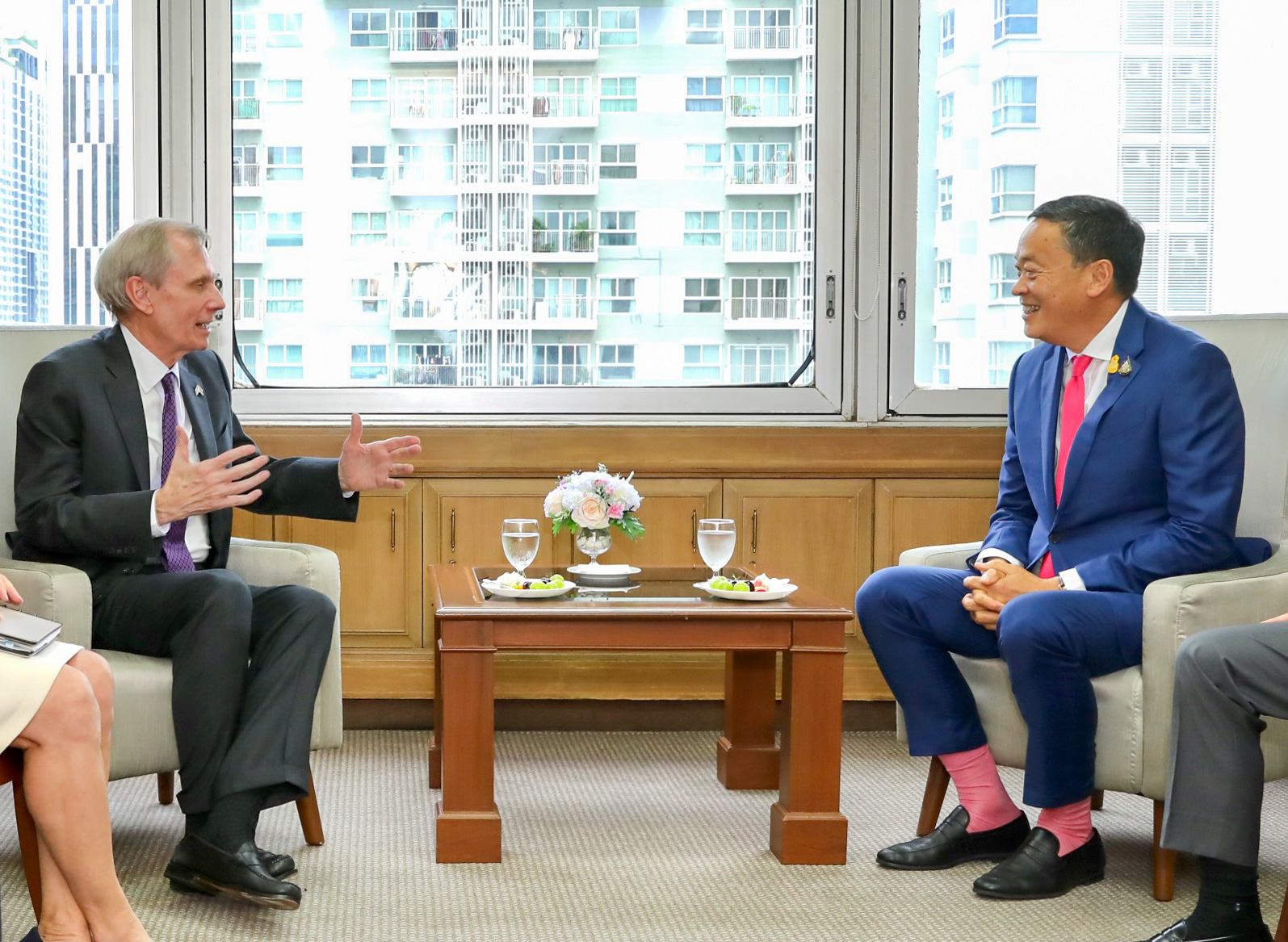
Srettha meets with U.S. Ambassador Robert F. Godec at Pheu Thai Party headquarters in 2023

On 8 September, Srettha undertook visits to the northeastern provinces of Khon Kaen, Udon Thani, and Nong Khai. These provinces are known strongholds of support for the Pheu Thai Party. Accompanied by several ministers, his visit mirrored the approach previously taken by former Prime Minister Thaksin Shinawatra.

In Khon Kaen, he visited included the Ubol Ratana Dam, a site experiencing drought conditions. Srettha communicated to the media that agriculture was a key priority for his government, emphasising plans to enhance agricultural productivity in the region, with a specific goal of increasing farmers' yields by 50%. In Nong Khai, his discussions centred on shipping relations between Thailand and China.

==== Economy ====
On 11 September, Srettha presented the cabinet's policy statement to Parliament. The statement outlined the government's strategies to address national issues, focusing on the economic sector. Despite high expectations from various economic, labour, and business groups, the statement faced critical analysis from opposition parties and media outlets. Sirikanya Tansakun, deputy leader and chief economist of the Move Forward Party, criticised the policy for its perceived lack of specificity and actionable goals. Sirikanya remarked on the absence of clear indicators and timeframes, comparing it to an earlier draft version that was leaked, and expressing concern over its potential effectiveness in guiding the country's economic direction.

Srettha described the economy as being in a "crisis." He highlighted that the highest interest rates in a decade were detrimental to businesses and advocated for the Bank of Thailand to reduce these rates.

The Governor of the Bank of Thailand held a different view. He disagreed with the characterisation of the economic state as a crisis. Furthermore, he expressed scepticism about the effectiveness of the government's short-term stimulus measures and argued that these measures would not address the underlying economic challenges, emphasising that structural issues were the main impediments to growth.

Srettha advocated for a 25-basis point interest rate cut from the BoT's Monetary Policy Committee (MPC). However, the MPC, in a 5–2 decision, maintained the one-day repurchase rate at 2.50%, the highest in over a decade. The central bank attributed the decision to slower-than-expected economic growth, emphasising reliance on domestic demand. Structural impediments, particularly declining competitiveness, were identified as factors hampering growth. Despite Srettha's disagreement with the Bank's actions, he advocated for collaborative fiscal and monetary policies, emphasizing his lack of authority to interfere with the central bank's decisions.

===== Infrastructure =====
The Thai Canal, with an estimated cost of ฿1 trillion, forms part of the Southern Economic Corridor. It is designed to be completed in two phases, with the first phase expected to conclude around 2030 and the second by 2039. Upon completion, the project aims to facilitate the handling of up to 20 million cargo containers annually.

This infrastructure project received cabinet approval on 16 October. During his subsequent visits to the United States for the APEC summit and to Beijing for the 2023 Belt and Road Forum, Prime Minister Srettha sought investment from both American and Chinese entities to support the development.

The land bridge project elicited significant concerns and criticism from the local population. Srettha acknowledged that the government's communication with international investors about the project's economic potential could have been more effective. He also The land bridge project elicited significant concerns and criticism from the local population. Srettha noted that the government had not succeeded in gaining the trust of the Thai people regarding this ambitious project, highlighting a disconnect between the project's intentions and public perception. He also acknowledged that the government's communication with international investors about the project's economic potential could have been more effective.

===== Tourism =====
Srettha wishes Thais and Chinese nationals a happy Chinese New Year 2024

Srettha worked actively on revitalising Thailand's tourism sector. On 25 September, tourists from China and Kazakhstan were exempted from tourist visas, aligning this policy change with the Golden Week and Chinese New Year holidays. Together with the Chinese ambassador, Han Zhiqiang, Srettha welcomed the first flight from Shanghai to Suvarnabhumi Airport since the implementation of this exemption. This visa exemption policy was planned to remain in effect until 29 February 2024 for Kazakhs. For Chinese tourists the visa exemption was extended, as both Thailand and China signed a visa exemption agreement which will take effect on 4 March 2024.

On 17 October, the cabinet approved an extension of the visa-free stay for Russian tourists from 30 to 90 days. This decision was timed with the onset of the Russian winter season and coincided with the peak tourism period in Thailand. Russia ranks as the fifth highest in terms of visitors to Thailand, and the highest from Europe. The extended visa policy for Russians is set to begin in November and last until April 2024. This extension was announced in conjunction with a meeting between Srettha and Russian President Vladimir Putin.

Further extending Thailand's visa exemption policy, Indian and Taiwanese travellers were also granted visa-free entry from 10 November 2023 to 10 May 2024. India is the fourth largest source of tourists to Thailand.

As a culmination of these visa exemptions and the gradual post-pandemic opening of its borders, flight arrivals for the high season had recovered to more than 80% of the levels seen in 2019.

On 16 February at the iBusiness Forum in Bangkok, Srettha was informed by the Anschutz Entertainment Group that the reason Taylor Swift was not going to perform in Thailand was because of a deal with Singapore where she agreed not to schedule any Eras Tour concerts in ASEAN countries other than Singapore. In response, Srettha pledged to support making Thailand a regional hub for concerts.

====== Strengthening the Thai passport ======
Countries and territories with visa-free entries or visas on arrival for holders of regular Thai passports Thailand Visa-free Visa on arrival or eVisa Visa on arrival eVisa Visa required

Srettha prioritised strengthening the Thai passport, ranked 52nd most powerful by The Passport Index in 2024. In discussions with Belgian Prime Minister Alexander De Croo in Switzerland, he explored the potential for easier entry to Europe for Thai passport holders. During German President Frank-Walter Steinmeier's January 2024 visit to Thailand, Srettha appealed for support in securing visa exemptions for Thai passport holders from Schengen area member states. Additionally, Thailand aims to extend the current 30-day visa exemptions for Schengen nations. To gain leverage in negotiations, Thailand is planning to collaborate with Vietnam, Cambodia, Laos and Malaysia to hold talks with the European Union (EU).

On 14 February, Australian Governor-General David Hurley agreed to consider the possibility of a mutual visa exemption scheme between Thailand and Australia during his visit.

===== Digital wallet scheme =====
In the lead-up to the 2023 election, the Pheu Thai party campaigned for a digital wallet initiative. This plan, aimed at Thai citizens over 16 years of age, involved distributing a government-funded handout of ฿10,000 per individual. The stipulation was that the funds must be spent within a 4 km radius of the recipient's address and within six months. To encompass the 54.8 million eligible citizens, the proposal would require an allocation of ฿560 billion from the government.

Srettha, following his election, maintained support for this policy, while acknowledging its controversial nature. Pheu Thai has described the initiative as vital for jumpstarting the Thai economy, with a commitment from Srettha's government to consider public feedback on the policy.

Concerns have been raised by various economic experts, including those from the Bank of Thailand. These criticisms focus on the potential long-term consequences for Thailand's economic future. Korn Chatikavanij, a former Finance Minister under Abhisit Vejjajiva's administration during the Great Recession, has also expressed scepticism about the plan, particularly noting its lack of specific details.

An ad-hoc committee has been established to flesh out the scheme. During a visit to Phitsanulok province on 15 October 2023, Srettha announced the intention to start implementing this scheme in February 2024. However, the launch of the digital wallet scheme was postponed to May 2024. Since September, Srettha also advocated for a reduction in electricity and fuel costs within his cabinet.

In terms of public reception, a survey conducted by the National Institute of Development Administration (NIDA) indicated mixed responses. As of October 2023, the survey showed that the efforts of the Prime Minister's cabinet had "somewhat satisfied" 55% of respondents, while 40% expressed dissatisfaction.

On 10 November 2023, Srettha announced plans to borrow ฿500 billion to support the digital wallet scheme. This decision marked a significant shift from the government's initial strategy, which involved funding the program through the annual budget or loans from the Government Savings Bank. The announcement was met with widespread criticism, highlighting a departure from previously stated financial approaches.

In January 2024, Deputy Finance Minister Julapun Amornvivat indicated that the implementation of the scheme might be postponed beyond May. Despite ongoing scepticism about the program, Srettha maintained that the government had sufficient data to demonstrate the program's effectiveness and value. Srettha had expressed his intention to expedite discussions with Deputy Finance Minister Julapun Amornvivat.

On 15 July 2024 Srettha announced that eligible businesses and individuals can register for the program beginning in August.

===== Electric vehicle industry =====
On 21 September 2023, Srettha engaged in discussions with Elon Musk about potential Tesla investments in the Thai electric vehicle industry. This meeting was part of Srettha's broader strategy to attract larger investments from companies like Tesla to bolster Thailand's electric vehicle sector. Srettha planned to continue these discussions in November. Additionally, following a visit to Malaysia on 11 October, Srettha indicated that Proton, along with its Chinese partner Geely, were considering the establishment of electric vehicle plants in Thailand. Additionally, Thailand was collaborating with Toyota to jointly develop the domestic electric vehicle industry.

Since the beginning of the Srettha government, the electric vehicle market in Thailand has experienced significant growth. This progress led to the China Automotive Technology and Research Center (CATARC) setting up its regional automaking hub in Thailand. Additionally, in January 2024, Thailand identified two major lithium deposits in Phang Nga with a high concentration of lithium. Experts from Chulalongkorn University have assessed that the average lithium content in these deposits, approximately 0.4%, is higher than similar deposits found globally. Nevertheless, there has been some debate among scientists and government officials regarding the potential impact of this discovery, particularly due to variations between the types of mineral resources present, including lepidolite, a lithium-containing mineral, and the actual lithium content in these deposits.

==== Cannabis ====
Cannabis has been decriminalised in Thailand since June 2022. In the 2023 election, Pheu Thai and Srettha ran on an anti-drug platform that opposed the total liberalisation of cannabis use except in medical use. This placed Srettha in opposition to the Bhumjaithai Party (BJT), where cannabis liberalisation is a flagship policy. He continued his pledge even after forming a coalition with BJT, saying that he aims to introduce cannabis laws within six-months. In November 2023, a draft bill seeking to restrict cannabis use failed. On 8 May 2024, Srettha announced he wished to see cannabis relisted as a narcotic by the end of 2024, restricting it to medical use only. He justified the policy U-turn by saying that drugs "destroys the future of the country." In July, the Ministry of Public Health approved the proposal to reclassify cannabis, forwarding the proposal to the Narcotics Control Authority. However, on 23 July, BJT leader Anuntin Charnvirakul announced that the coalition partners had reached an agreement to regulate cannabis use through legislation and not through relisting it as a narcotic. BJT is the second largest party in Pheu Thai's coalition, and Srettha's proposals on cannabis created a rift between the two parties.

==== Guns ====
In response to the shooting at Siam Paragon in Bangkok on 3 October, Srettha observed a minute of silence at the same location on the following day. During this event, he emphasised the importance of prevention, stating, "Let this be the only time this happens. My government insists we will give priority to preventive measures." Srettha contacted the Chinese ambassador to assure him of the enhanced safety measures for tourists, before contacting other ambassadors of the home countries of the victims who died in the shooting.

Following these events, a comprehensive national crackdown was undertaken. By 12 October, this operation resulted in the seizure of over 2,000 illegal firearms, approximately 75,000 rounds of ammunition, and led to 1,593 arrests. Additionally, the Interior Minister suspended the trade and importation of firearms, including suspending the issuance of new firearm permits.

==== Military ====
Srettha once answered a question from the press regarding the military reformation policy of the Pheu Thai party, saying that he did not want to call it "reform" but a "joint development" between the civilian leadership and the military.

Following the sinking of the Thai corvette HTMS Sukhothai on 18 December 2022, the Joint United States Military Advisory Group Thailand (JUSMAGTHAI) reached out to the Royal Thai Navy (RTN) to express its concerns. However, there was no response from Thailand to this communication. On 1 December of the same year, JUSMAGTHAI sent a second letter in response to reports that a Thai contractor, who was collaborating with China, had been chosen to salvage the vessel. Despite the bid from the winning company still awaiting approval, RTN Chief Admiral Adung Phan-iam expressed concerns about potential delays beyond April if the U.S. became involved. In response to two warnings from the U.S., and to comply with their agreement, the RTN cancelled the tender that was to be awarded to a firm using equipment from China.

==== Environment ====
Thailand's increased gas consumption rates and dependence on gas imports over the past 50 years.

The government before Srettha faced challenges in addressing PM 2.5 air pollution and in supporting resource-based communities. The environmental policies of Srettha's government were categorised under mid to long-term plans in their policy presentation to Parliament.

On 6 October 2023, Srettha attended the ESG (Environmental-Social-Governance) Symposium 2023: Accelerating Changes towards a Low Carbon Society at the Queen Sirikit National Convention Center. Here, he shared his vision for a sustainable economy, emphasising grassroots participation, human rights, equality, and climate change initiatives.

Srettha also participated in the Sustainability Forum 2024 in Bangkok, where he discussed Thailand's role in sustainable development globally. He expressed a commitment to reducing electricity costs and highlighted the importance of household solar initiatives.

On 29 November 2023, he led a meeting in Chiang Mai focusing on the region's environmental issues, including forest fires, smog, and PM 2.5 pollution. Later, on 11 January 2024, during another visit to Chiang Mai, he endorsed the Clean Air bill. He noted an improvement in the air quality in Chiang Mai compared to the previous year.

However, the Chiang Mai Administrative Court ruled against the Prime Minister and the National Environment Board. The court's decision centred on their failure to adequately address the PM 2.5 haze issue in the North the previous year. Srettha would convene a meeting of government officials to comply with the court order.

==== Education ====
Before becoming prime minister, Srettha was an advocate for reducing educational inequality. He aimed to nurture knowledgeable and morally responsible young individuals who understand the importance of collaboration in building a better society and nation. His administration was also dedicated to creating Thailand's first comprehensive database on school dropouts. Srettha has expressed a commitment to eliminating barriers to education for Thai children, setting a goal to reduce the number of children without educational opportunities to zero. Additionally, he emphasized the need to develop the skills of young people and highlighted the significance of investing in education as a means to enhance quality of life and civic responsibilities.

=== Foreign affairs ===
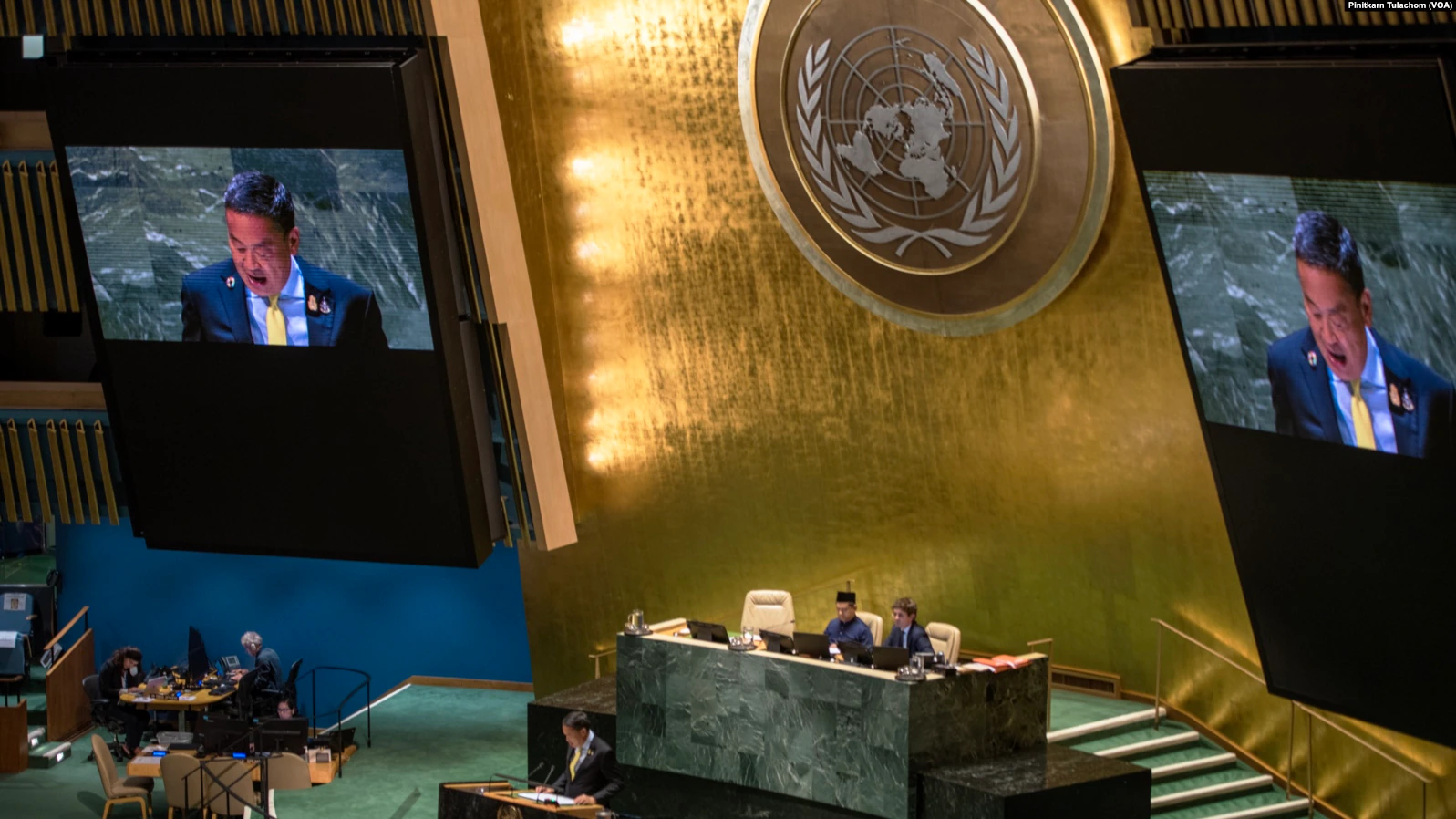
Srettha giving a speech at the 78th session of the United Nations General Assembly in 2023

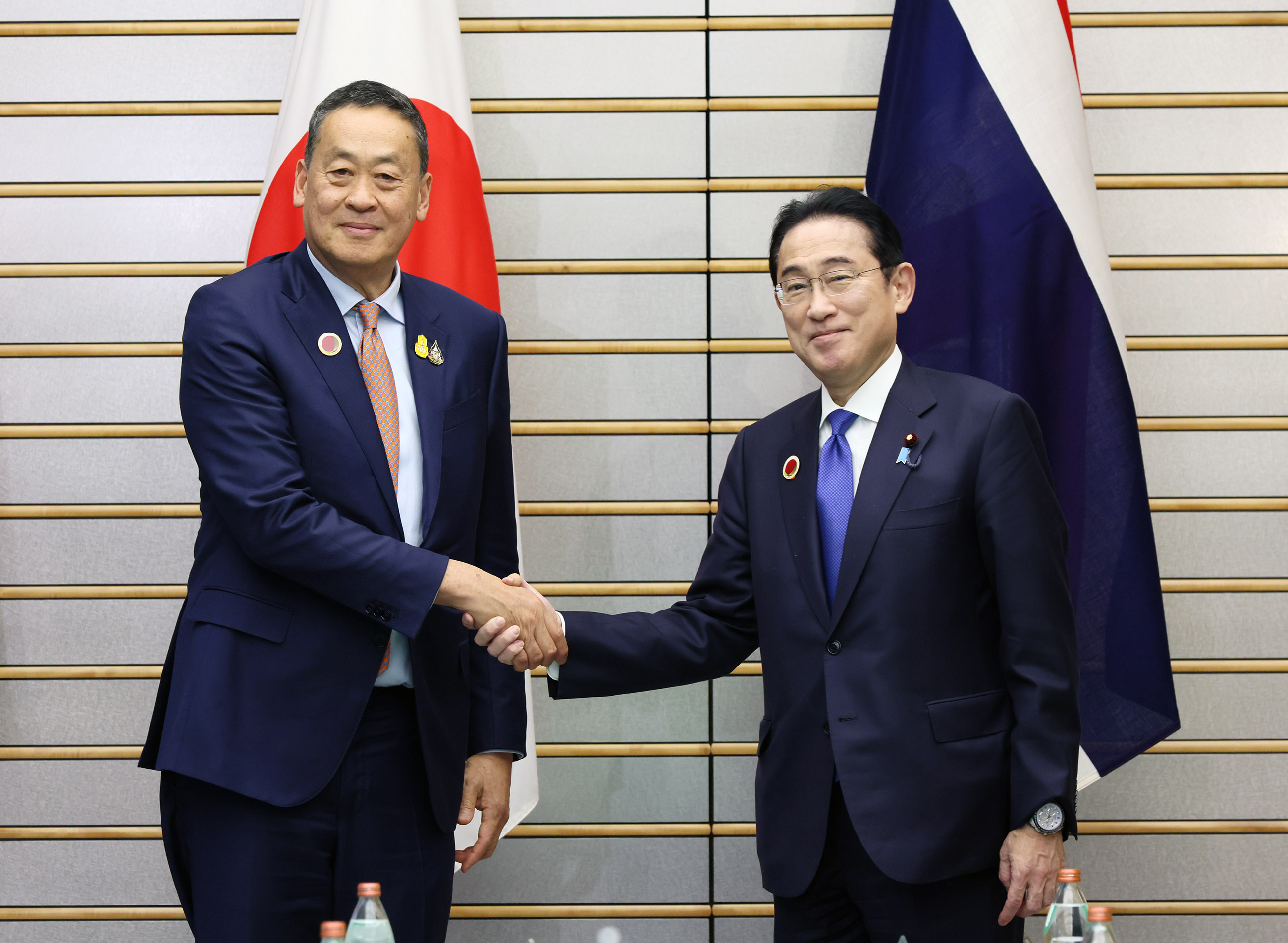
Srettha with Prime Minister of Japan, Fumio Kishida in 2023

On 21 September, Srettha conducted a virtual meeting with Elon Musk in New York City. The focus of this meeting was on the electric vehicle industry and potential Tesla investments in Thailand. Additionally, Srettha engaged with representatives from major corporations such as Estee Lauder, Google, and Microsoft. The aim of these discussions was to enhance foreign investment in Thailand. During these meetings, Srettha remarked on Thailand's position in comparison to Vietnam in terms of free trade agreements. On 24 September, Srettha announced expectations of receiving approximately $5 billion in investments from Google, Microsoft, and Tesla. This statement was made in the context of his efforts to boost foreign investment in Thailand.

Srettha also made his debut speech at the 78th session of the United Nations General Assembly in New York on 22 September. His speech emphasised Thailand's desire to collaborate with other nations and to strengthen its democracy. On the same day, he met with executives from the New York Stock Exchange, discussing the economic policies of his government. He concluded his visit by participating in the traditional bell-ringing ceremony to commence the trading session.

Furthermore, Srettha actively led Thailand's effort to become the Association of Southeast Asian Nations (ASEAN) candidate for the 2025 to 2027 term on the United Nations Human Rights Council.

On 9 October, he began his visit to Hong Kong, where he met with John Lee Ka-chiu, the Chief Executive of Hong Kong. His trip to Hong Kong is part of a tour to encourage investment in Thailand. Then on 10 October, Srettha visited Brunei and was received by Sultan Hassanal Bolkiah at the Istana Nurul Iman palace, and both spoke of closer Brunei-Thailand relations. They also spoke of the two countries' cooperation in food security, where Thailand plans to increase its food exports to Brunei. He then flew to Kuala Lumpur to hold bilateral talks with Malaysia, where he discussed bilaterial relations on investment, trade, food, tourism and security with Malaysia's Prime minister Anwar Ibrahim, as well as securing Thai hostages taken by Hamas. On 12 October, he then visited Singapore where he discussed renewable energy, investment and food security with Prime-minister Lee Hsien Loong. Srettha visited China from 16 to 19 October, where he attended the Belt and Road Forum for International Cooperation in Beijing. On the sidelines of the forum on 17 October, he met with the President of Russia, Vladimir Putin. Together they discussed boosting trade and cultural ties between Russia and Thailand. Srettha then invited Putin to visit Thailand in 2024, saying "President Putin likes Phuket, I understand he travels often." According to the Bangkok Post, the invitation was accepted by Putin. Thailand is not a ratified signatory of the Rome Statute of the International Criminal Court and is not obliged to arrest Putin following the arrest warrant issued by the ICC on 17 March 2023.

During his visit to Laos on 29 October, Srettha participated in discussions focused on enhancing bilateral trade between Laos and Thailand, with an objective to reach US$11 billion by 2025. In addition to trade, a significant aspect of this collaboration involves infrastructure development, particularly in transportation. A key project is the construction of a new railway across the Mekong River, anticipated to be completed by at least 2026. Complementing this endeavour, Srettha and Lao Prime Minister Sonexay Siphandone inaugurated the Khamsavath station, a crucial component of a new railway line extending to Nong Khai. This new line is expected to be operational by 2024, further facilitating cross-border connectivity. In line with Srettha's administration's strategy to enhance bilateral relations and cooperation with Laos, a memorandum of understanding was signed focusing on technical assistance for the development of Laos' railway system. Alongside this, Srettha indicated an interest in increasing the purchase of clean energy from Laos. Furthermore, the two countries agreed to construct a sixth friendship bridge, further solidifying their collaborative efforts.

During his official visit to Japan from 14 to 18 December, Srettha participated in the ASEAN-Japan Commemorative Summit. To boost business relations, he temporarily waived visa requirements for Japanese business travellers. Discussions with the Japanese Government included a focus on strengthening cooperation between Thailand and Japan. Srettha expressed support for initiatives like the Asia Zero Emission Community (AZEC) and the Strategic Programme for ASEAN Climate and Environment. He also conveyed Thailand's readiness to play a leading role in ensuring peace in Myanmar, considering its geographical proximity. In a separate meeting with Japanese Prime Minister Fumio Kishida, the dialogue centred around potential collaboration in the electric vehicle sector. This discussion was a continuation of both leaders' previous expressions of intent to deepen bilateral ties, as stated during their meeting a month earlier in San Francisco.

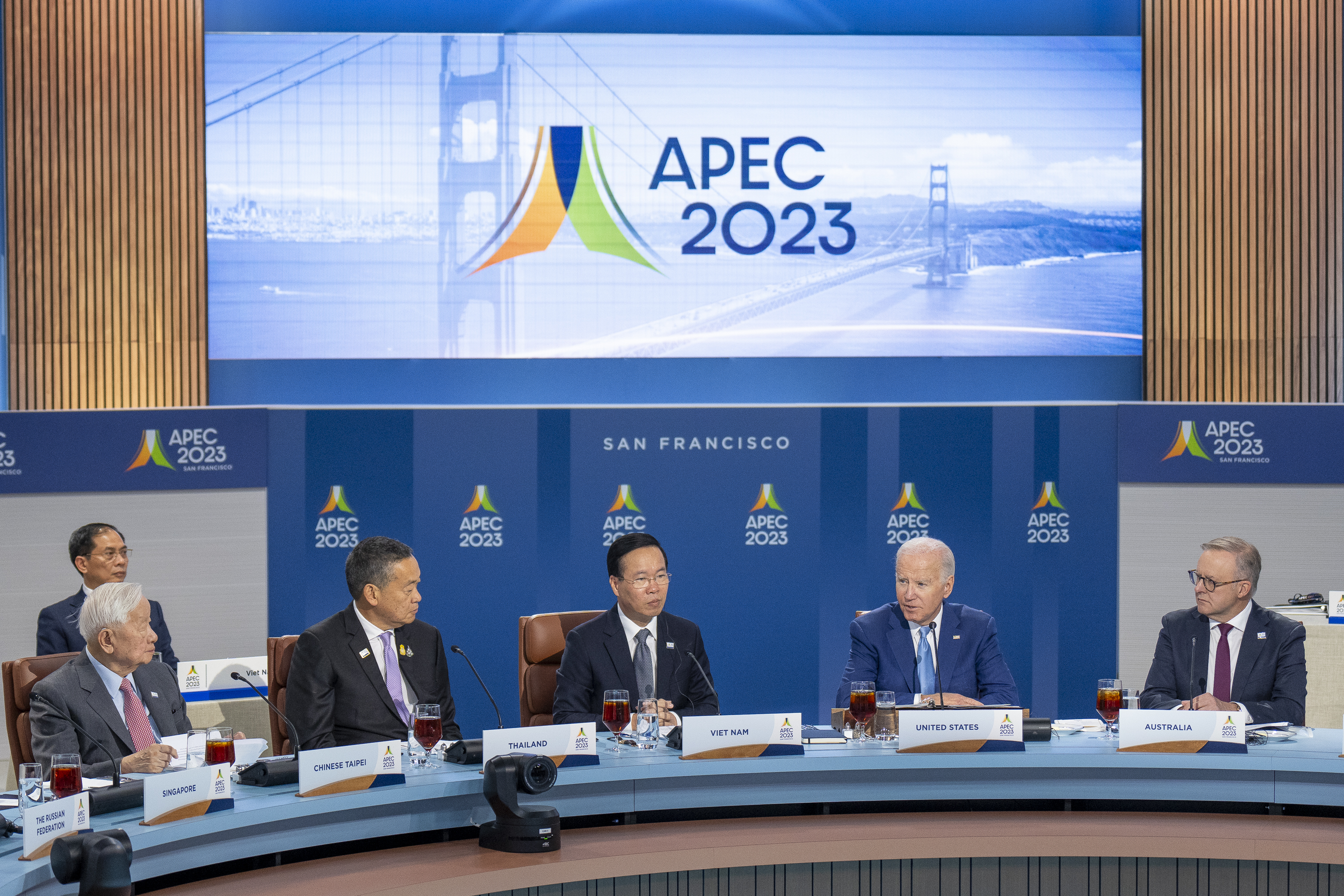
Srettha (second from left) at APEC Informal Dialogue and Working Lunch in 2023

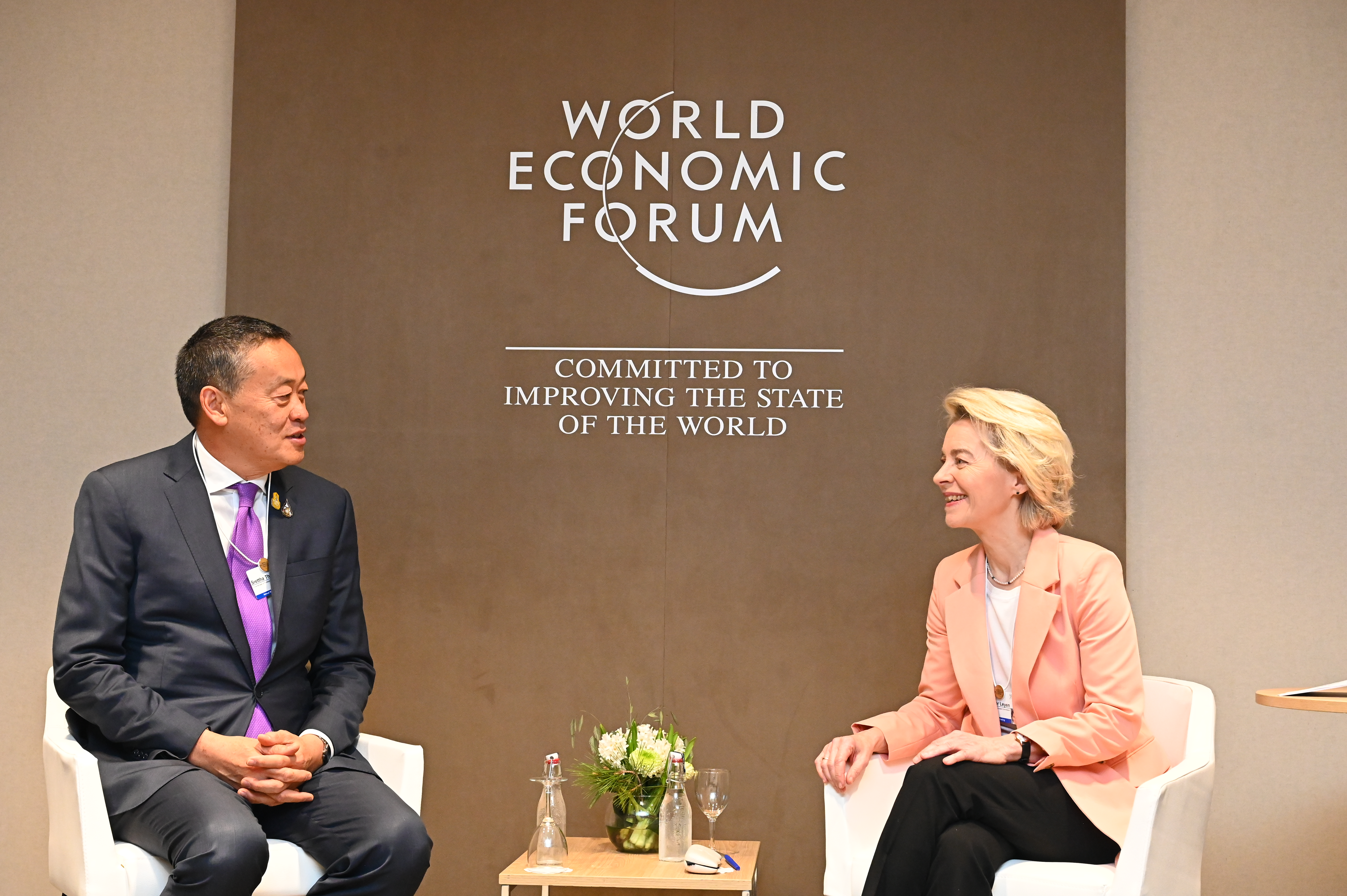
Srettha with Ursula von der Leyen, President of the European Commission at the World Economic Forum in Davos, Switzerland in 2024

During the 2024 World Economic Forum conference held from 15 to 19 January in Davos, Switzerland, Srettha represented his government to promote the land bridge mega project. He was joined by Transport Minister Suriya Jungrungruangkit and Foreign Minister Parnpree Bahiddha-Nukara. On 17 January, Srettha introduced the concept of 'Seamless ASEAN', envisioning it as a unified tourist destination achievable within the next 5 to 10 years. Srettha's engagements in Davos included a discussion with the Adani Group, during which he shared on social media that the group showed significant interest in the project. Additionally, he held a separate meeting with Microsoft co-founder Bill Gates, where they explored the possibility of establishing a Microsoft data center in Thailand. Another notable meeting was with Sultan Ahmed bin Sulayem, the chairman and CEO of Dubai Ports World (DP World). Srettha reported that the CEO of DP World expressed a keen interest in the land bridge project and committed to sending representatives to Thailand for further discussions and location scouting. Upon returning to Thailand, Srettha described the meetings and interactions at the conference as successful, indicating positive international response to his government's initiatives.

On 25 January 2024, Srettha welcomed Frank-Walter Steinmeier, the President of Germany, marking a significant occasion in his administration. This visit was notable as it was the first time in 22 years that the German President visited Thailand. The visit, spanning from 24 to 26 January, focused on key issues such as trade, investment, climate change, and vocational education. During this visit, President Steinmeier commended the Thai civilian government for its efforts in bolstering the democratic process in Thailand. He acknowledged that while substantial changes could not be expected so soon into the administration, the initial developments were promising. Furthermore, President Steinmeier expressed a commitment to enhancing investments in Thailand's electric vehicle industry, suggesting that Thailand could become a regional hub for this sector.

Srettha participated in the Independence Day celebrations at Galle Face Green in Colombo, Sri Lanka, on 4 February 2024. The visit was a response to Sri Lanka seeking Thailand's assistance in revitalizing its economy amid a challenging period. The state visit culminated when the two nations signed a Free Trade Agreement (FTA). As a guest of honor alongside Sri Lankan President Ranil Wickremesinghe, they finalized a Free Trade Agreement (FTA) aimed at fostering economic cooperation. The FTA, replacing a prior agreement from 1950, focuses on reducing trade barriers and fostering collaboration in air services. Anticipated benefits for Thailand include enhanced exports of automotive parts, textiles, electrical appliances, machinery, steel products, paper, processed food, and animal feed. Additionally, a Memorandum of Understanding (MoU) was signed to facilitate collaboration between the National Gem and Jewellery Authority of Thailand and The Gem and Jewellery Research and Training Institute of Sri Lanka. Upon returning to Thailand, Srettha held discussions with the CEO and board chairman of PTT, encouraging their support for Thai startups and investment in Sri Lanka's floating solar farm.

On 7 February 2024, Cambodian Prime Minister Hun Manet visited Thailand for official discussions encompassing transport, trade, investment, and the long-stalled joint development of natural resources within their disputed maritime boundary. This marked Hun Manet's inaugural visit as the country's leader, aiming to strengthen the longstanding ties between the two nations. Srettha actively engaged in the bilateral talks, emphasising Thailand's commitment to ensuring fair treatment and an adequate economic safety net for Cambodian workers in the country. Notably, recent events revealed the detention of Cambodian opposition figures and government critics in Bangkok, who had sought refuge in Thailand to evade arrest under Hun Sen's government, potentially indicating efforts to prevent protests against Hun Manet. Manet expressed gratitude to Srettha for preventing Thailand from being used as a base for external interference in his country's affairs. In a joint press conference, both Srettha and Manet announced their shared objective to increase bilateral trade value from 8 billion baht in 2023 to 15 billion baht by the following year. Given Thailand's reliance on imported energy, there was a keen interest in negotiating a deal with Cambodia to develop a disputed zone in the Gulf of Thailand, believed to harbor significant natural gas and oil deposits totalling around 11 trillion cubic feet. In addition, Hun Manet planned to meet with King Maha Vajiralongkorn and participate in a Thailand-Cambodia business forum. Thailand and Cambodia signed five Memoranda of Understanding.

==== Foreign policy ====
In response to the Gaza war, Srettha denounced the actions of Hamas, including their kidnapping of Thai citizens. He then ordered the Royal Thai Air Force to begin evacuations of Thai citizens in cooperation the Ministry of Foreign Affairs.

===== Myanmar civil war =====
Following developments in January 2024 during Operation 1027, Srettha's government is considering sending humanitarian aid to Myanmar through the Asean Five-Point Consensus.

=== Dismissal ===
In May 2024, 40 military-appointed senators submitted a case accepted by the Constitutional Court requesting the removal of Srettha and Pichit Chuenban under Section 170 (4) and (5) of the Constitution, which concerns the ethics of cabinet ministers. The case was in response to Srettha's appointment of Pichit, who had previously served time in jail for attempting to bribe Supreme Court officials, as a minister of the Prime Minister's Office.

Pichit resigned on 21 May. On 14 August, the constitutional court dismissed Srettha for gross ethics violations. Srettha is the fourth Thai premier in 16 years to be removed by the courts. Srettha expressed surprise over the decision, but said that he would "respect" it.

== Political positions ==
=== Social issues ===
Srettha has been known for his support of former Prime Minister Thaksin Shinawatra, who was removed from office in 2006. This support was notably demonstrated in 2010 when Srettha wore a red shirt featuring Thaksin's face, coinciding with his appointment as the head of the Royal Bangkok Polo club's football team. Srettha's political stance has also been evident in his criticism of then-Prime Minister Prayut Chan-o-cha's management of the COVID-19 pandemic in Thailand. Additionally, he has shown support for the pro-democracy protests that occurred from 2020 to 2021, calling on UNICEF to urge the government to avoid violence against protesters. During his 2023 election campaign, Srettha publicly stated his reluctance to form a coalition government with United Thai Nation and Palang Pracharat. However, upon his swearing-in as prime minister, the coalition cabinet included members from these parties.

In terms of social issues, Srettha is identified as a liberal. He has expressed opposition to conscription and has been an advocate for environmental sustainability and LGBTQ rights. Despite these progressive stances, Srettha showed reluctance to propose changes to the lèse-majesté laws (which criminalize defamation, insults, and threats to the monarch of Thailand), a decision attributed to maintaining support within the coalition government formed by Pheu Thai with other parties. He also moved to recriminalise cannabis in 2024.

=== Economics ===
In a 2023 interview with FAROSE, Srettha clarified his positions on economic issues. He stated that he believes in "capitalism with empathy." As an ex-CEO and businessman who recently entered politics, he believes that capitalism and empathy for the poor can go hand in hand. He stated that "The various problems that come with economic disparity and social inequality should be discussed with empathy and understanding." With Pheu Thai, he has pledged to stimulate the economy and combat poverty through raising the minimum wage and implementing a ฿10,000 'digital wallet' scheme.

== Personal life ==
Srettha's nickname is Nid (Thai: นิด, RTGS: Nit, pronounced [nít]). He is 1.92 metres (6 ft 4 in) tall, which made him the tallest leader within ASEAN and the third tallest in the world behind Edi Rama of Albania and Aleksandar Vučić of Serbia when he was in office.

Srettha is married to Pakpilai Thavisin, a businesswoman. They have two sons, Napat Thavisin and Warat Thavisin, and one daughter, Chananda Thavisin. His mother, Chodchoy, died on 21 July 2024. Her funeral was granted royal-sponsored bathing rites by King Vajiralongkorn on 30 July and was held on 6 August.

He is a collector of classic travel trunks, such as those made by Louis Vuitton. Srettha also is a supporter of Liverpool F.C., and also contributes to Sansiri Academy which trains football players in Thailand. Srettha frequently uses social media, especially on X where he actively uses his account to post updates.

On 28 December 2023, the NACC revealed that he had a wealth valued around ฿659 million, and that he owns a 1963 Aston Martin DB5 worth ฿50 million. His yearly earnings were around ฿153 million.

== Honours ==
- Knight Grand Cordon of the Most Exalted Order of the White Elephant (2024)
- Knight Grand Cordon of the Most Noble Order of the Crown of Thailand (2024)

== Notes ==
Political offices
Preceded by Prayut Chan-o-cha	Prime Minister of Thailand; 2023–2024	Succeeded by Phumtham Wechayachai as Acting prime minister
Preceded by Arkhom Termpittayapaisith	Minister of Finance; 2023–2024	Succeeded by Pichai Chunhavajira
