= Party of Thai Counties =

Thai political party

Party of Thai Counties พรรคท้องที่ไทย
- Abbreviation: PTC
- Leader: Bancha Dejcharoensirikul
- Secretary-General: Atthasit Chuensanguan
- Founder: Veera Meethong
- Founded: 17 March 2021
- Registered: 28 February 2022
- Ideology: Conservatism; Devolution; Localism
- Political position: Centre-right
- Parliament: 0 / 500

Website
- ptc.or.th

The Party of Thai Counties, (abbreviated PTC; Thai: พรรคท้องที่ไทย) is a political party from Thailand founded in 2022.

== History ==
The party was formed at a meeting on 17 March 2021. It was officially registered with the Thai Election Commission Office on 28 February 2022 with Veera Meethong as its first leader. In February 2023, the party changed its executive committee by appointing Bancha Dejcharoensirikul.

The party won a single seat in the 2023 general election, that of party leader. The party's platform gained significant traction on social media due to its highly discussed proposal regarding traditional funeral wakes. Commonly referred to in online public discourse as the "Ngan Sop Mai Srao, Khaoya Dai" (Cheerful Funerals with Dice Shaking) initiative, the policy proposes the legal and regulated allowance of traditional gambling—such as card games and Hi-Lo (dice games)—during local funeral services. According to the party leadership, this measure aims to align legal frameworks with existing cultural practices, while generating community-driven financial contributions to help grieving families offset high funeral expenses.

On September 3, 2026, Pol. Lt. Gen. Rewat Klinngesorn, the former commander of the Narcotics Suppression Bureau, announced his intention to assume the leadership of the Party of Thai Counties.

While Pol. Lt. Gen. Rewat had initially planned to serve only as the party's chief strategist, he subsequently decided to take over the leadership position. Consequently, the incumbent party leader, Bancha, will transition to the role of deputy leader. The primary political platform of the Party of Thai Counties focuses on anti-corruption initiatives and combating drug trafficking.

In addition to leadership changes, Pol. Lt. Gen. Rewat announced plans to alter the strategic direction and branding of the political party. He contacted the Office of the Election Commission of Thailand (ECT) to reserve a new name, intending to rename the Party of Thai Counties to the Rak Mueang Thai Party.

As of September 2026, the party is in the process of preparing official documentation for the name change. Concurrently, preparations are underway to convene a general assembly to formally vote on the new party leader and the executive committee.

The general assembly of the party is scheduled for October 15, 2026. The primary agenda includes the amendment of party regulations to officially change the party's name to the Rak Mueang Thai Party and the election of a new executive committee to restructure the organization.

== Electoral Results ==
Year	Results		%		Seats	Status	Government
Year	Fpv	Ppr	Fpv	Ppr	Seats	Status	Government
2023	1202	201411	0,00	0,54	1/500	Minority (coalition)	Srettha
