= Pichit Chuenban =

Thai politician and lawyer (born 1959)

- พิชิต ชื่นบาน
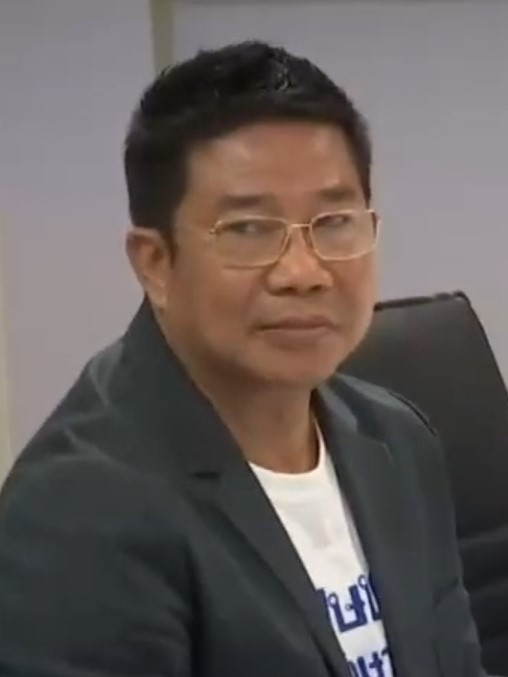
- Pichit in 2018

Minister to the Office of the Prime Minister
- In office 27 April 2024 – 21 May 2024
- Prime Minister: Srettha Thavisin
- Preceded by: Puangpet Chunlaiad
- Succeeded by: Chousak Sirinil

Personal details
- Born: 22 January 1959 (age 67)
- Party: Pheu Thai Party

Pichit Chuenban (Thai: พิชิต ชื่นบาน, RTGS: Phichit Chuenban; born 22 January 1959) is a Thai lawyer and politician who served as an MP and as a Prime Minister's Office Minister between 27 April 2024 and 21 May 2024. He had previously served as a lawyer to Thaksin Shinawatra, where he was involved in a bribery scandal and sentenced to six months in jail in 2008. Pichit was subsequently part of the legal team of the Pheu Thai Party, where he served under Prime Minister Yingluck Shinawatra.

== Law and political career ==
=== Bribery scandal ===
In 2008, Pichit began representing Thaksin Shinawatra and his wife Potjaman Na Pombejra in the Ratchadaphisek land case. On 25 June 2008, the Supreme Court sentenced Pichit, Thana Tansiri, and Supasri Srisawat to six months in prison for contempt of court after attempting to bribe Supreme Court officials by handing them a lunchbox containing ฿2 million inside a paper bag. The bag had been left at the Supreme Court earlier on 10 June and was discovered on the same day Thaksin and Potjaman were due to appear before the court. All three denied any wrongdoing. Thana admitted to the money belonging to him. He however said that the money was not intended to be a bribe and the fault laid in his driver who was supposed to pick up an identical bag containing chocolate for the Supreme Court officials. After serving their six months jail time, prosecutors didn't press bribery charges against them.

The Lawyers Council of Thailand subsequently suspended their licenses for five years after their sentences. On 30 May 2014, the Central Administrative Court dismissed an attempt by Pichit and Supasri to overturn their license bans.

=== Lawyer and MP for Pheu Thai ===
After Pichit's prison sentence, he became a lawyer for the Pheu Thai party, a successor to Thaksin's Thai Rak Thai party. After Thaksin was re-issued a Thai passport while in self-imposed exile in December 2011, Pichit - who had become part of Pheu Thai's legal team - defended the Ministry of Foreign Affairs' decision. Also during 2011, Pichit was elected a party-list MP for Pheu Thai in the House of Representatives after the 2011 general election.

In April 2013, Pheu Thai and coalition parties enacted a bill to amend Article 68 and 237 of the 2007 constitution of Thailand, seeking to restrict the people's right to submit petitions to the Constitutional Court via the Office of the Attorney-General only. This was criticised by 40 senators, and a complaint was filed to the Constitutional Court against 312 Parliamentarians by Senator Somchai Sawaengkarn on 2 April. Pichit responded by saying that the court's judges would face a probe for accepting Somchai's complaint by violating Article 40 of the charter by violating the defender's right to a fair trial by indicating their opinions on the case. Pichit also defended the amendment by stating that Article 291 of the constitution allowed for Parliament to amend some articles and that their amendment would not deprive people of rights. On 20 April, he issued a statement on behalf of affected MPs and Senators.

During a cabinet reshuffle on 30 June 2013, Pichit was expected to have been appointed as a Prime Minister's Office Minister under Prime Minister Yingluck Shinawatra.

In January 2014, the National Anti-Corruption Commission (NACC) began to investigate Prime Minister Yingluck Shinawatra over her role in the rice pledging scheme. In February, the NACC came to the decision to charge Yingluck for dereliction of duty and called her to report to the NACC office on 27 February. She was however absent and sent her lawyer Pichit to acknowledge the charge on her behalf. Later in March during the Pheu Thai campaign for the 2014 general election, Pichit and 15 other candidates came under controversy for allegedly violating Section 60 of the law governing elections by appearing on the state-owned Channel 11 between 10 December 2013 and 7 January 2014. Section 60 deals with the use of state media for election campaigns.

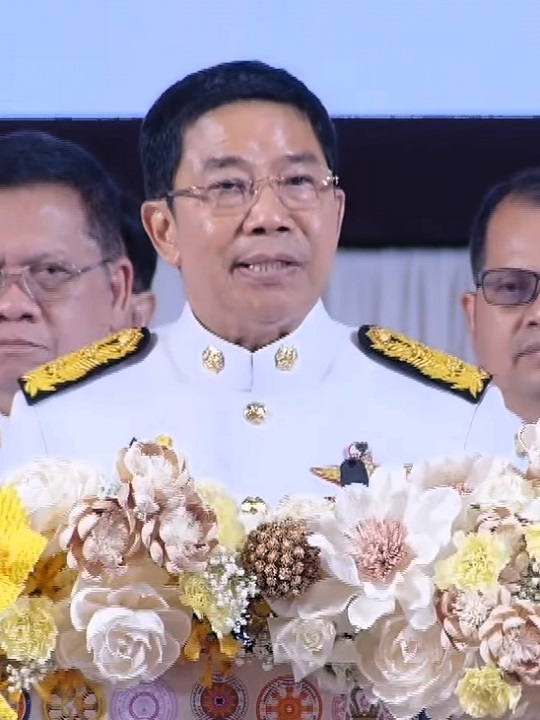
Pichit on 19 May 2024 at Maha Chulalongkorn Rajavidyalaya University in Bangkok

=== As Prime Minister's Office Minister ===
During a cabinet reshuffle in April 2024, Pichit was appointed as a Prime Minister's Office Minister. Pichit had previously been an advisor to Srettha Thavisin. His qualifications and eligibility were also checked by the Legal Execution Department, NACC, Secretariat to the Prime Minister, and Royal Thai Police.

On April 30, Pichit Chaimongkol of the Network of Students and People Reforming Thailand and Anond Klingkaew of the People's Centre to Protect the Monarchy petitioned the Election Commission to investigate the qualifications of Pichit as Prime Minister's Office Minister. On May 17, a group of 40 military-appointed outgoing senators acting in a caretaker role filed a petition to the Constitutional Court requesting the removal of Pichit and Srettha from office. The senators argued that Pichit was unfit to serve in a cabinet post due to him having served jail time, and that his appointment violated Section 160 (4) and (5) of the court charter. Pichit responded by saying that the dismissal case against him and Srettha was a ploy aimed primarily at deposing Srettha as Prime Minister, and that ministerial ethics apply only to his actions after appointment and did not apply to when he was imprisoned. Other critics of his appointment point to Pichit's close relations to former Prime Minister Thaksin Shinawatra who returned to Thailand from exile in 2023 but still holds considerable influence in the Pheu Thai Party.

On 21 May 2024, Pichit resigned from his position of Prime Minister's Office Minister even though he had declared in the morning that he wouldn't quit. In his resignation letter, he stated that "Even though I have been vetted and honestly believe that I am qualified by law, this matter is linked to the prime minister." The Constitutional Court subsequently dropped the case against Pichit, but kept the case against Srettha open which will be ruled on 14 August. On 10 June, Srettha submitted his written defence to the court where he argued that Article 160 (4) and (5) can only applied to when Pichit was appointed as a Prime Minister's Office Minister and not retroactively. On 14 August, the Constitutional Court dismissed Srettha for appointing Pichit to his cabinet, ruling that his inclusion fell short of official moral and ethical standards.

The Bangkok Post described his resignation as an attempt to spare Srettha from "possible legal hurdles associated with appointing him". According to The Nation, his appointment and the filing of a court case against Pichit and Srettha has caused the popularity of the Pheu Thai Party to worsen.
