= Pichai Naripthaphan =

Thai politician

- พิชัย นริพทะพันธุ์
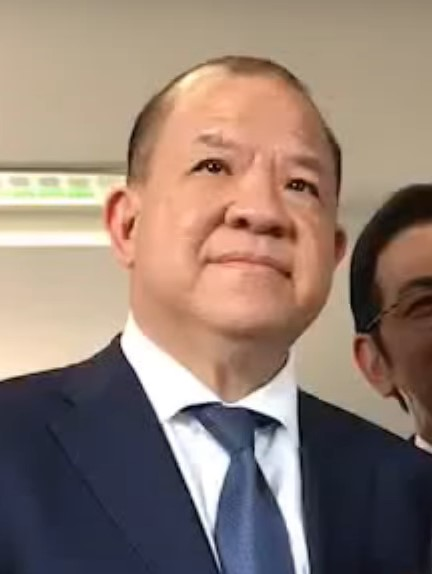

Minister of Commerce
- In office 3 September 2024 – 30 June 2025
- Prime Minister: Paetongtarn Shinawatra
- Preceded by: Phumtham Wechayachai
- Succeeded by: Jatuporn Buruspat

Minister of Energy
- In office 9 August 2011 – 18 January 2012
- Prime Minister: Yingluck Shinawatra
- Preceded by: Wannarat Channukul
- Succeeded by: Arak Chontharanon

Personal details
- Born: October 29, 1961 (age 64)
- Party: Pheu Thai (2011–present)
- Spouse: Thanyathorn Naripthaphan
- Education: Chulalongkorn University (Bachelor of Arts, Master of Arts)

Pichai Naripthaphan (Thai: พิชัย นริพทะพันธุ์, RTGS: Phichai Naripthaphan; born 29 October 1961) is a Thai businessman and politician, serving as Minister of Commerce since 2024. Under his leadership, the Ministry has announced plans to address the influx of goods from imported from China in the Thai market.

Pichai was summoned by the NCPO for 10 times and was taken into the ‘attitude adjustment’ process for 8 times. He has faced a variant of intimidations, ranging from the incidents that he was taken into military camps, was blindfolded, was taken to the abandoned building as well as the incident that he was visited by the military officers at his place as an expected consequence from his comments on country's economic situation under the rule of military government given through the press and his Facebook page which receives hundred thousand of followers.

== Royal decorations ==
Pichai has received the following royal decorations in the Honours System of Thailand:

- 2011 - Knight Grand Cross of the Most Exalted Order of the White Elephant
- 2009 - Knight Grand Cross of the Most Noble Order of the Crown of Thailand
