= Parnpree Bahiddha-nukara =

Thai Deputy Prime Minister and Minister of Foreign Affairs since 2023 (born 1957)

- ปานปรีย์ พหิทธานุกร
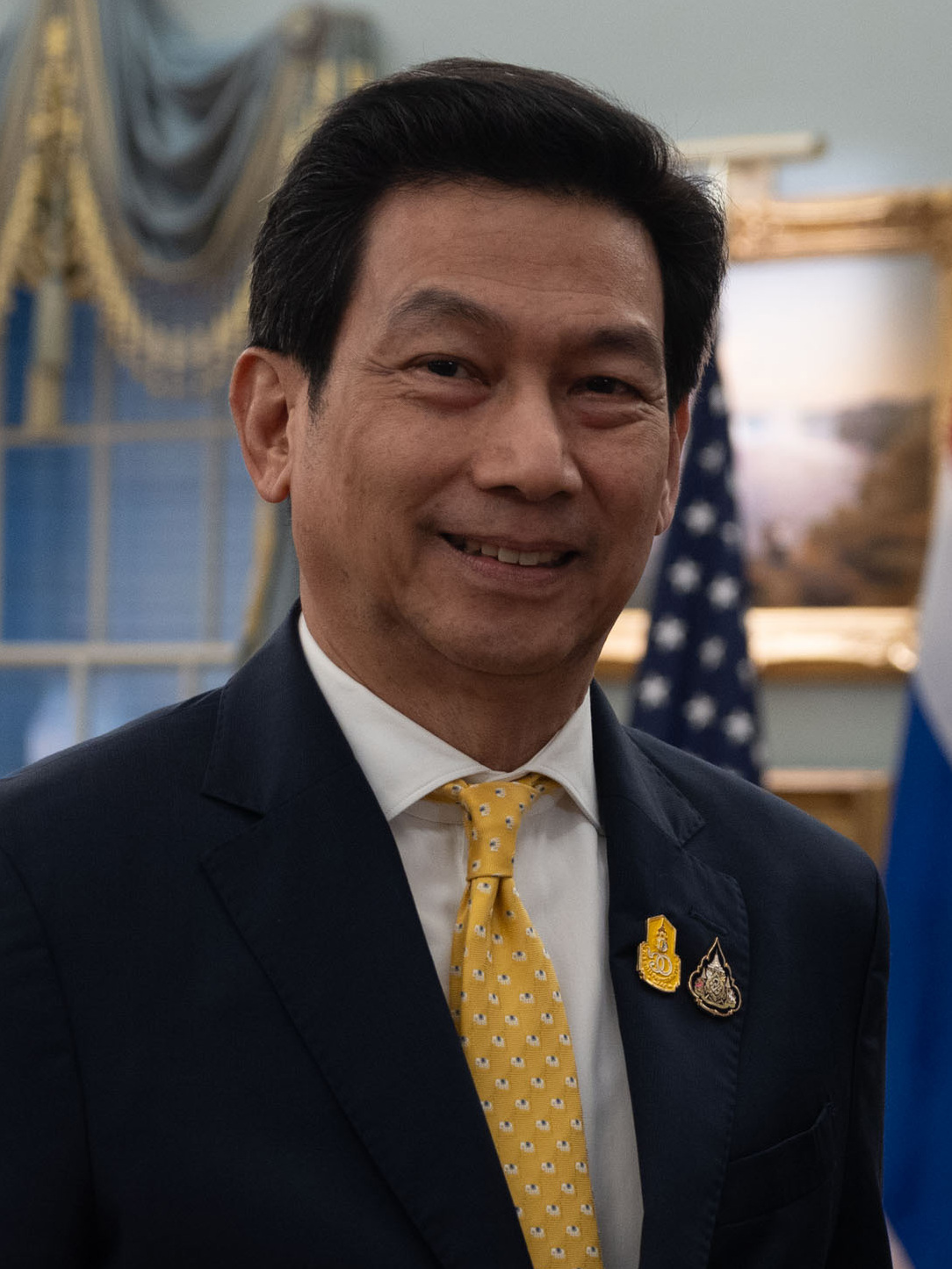
- Parnpree in 2024

Deputy Prime Minister of Thailand
- In office 1 September 2023 – 27 April 2024
- Prime Minister: Srettha Thavisin

Minister of Foreign Affairs
- In office 1 September 2023 – 28 April 2024
- Prime Minister: Srettha Thavisin
- Preceded by: Don Pramudwinai
- Succeeded by: Maris Sangiampongsa

Personal details
- Born: 20 August 1957 (age 68) Bangkok, Thailand
- Party: Pheu Thai
- Spouse: Paveena Bahiddha-nukara
- Education: Triam Udom Suksa School
- Alma mater: Chulalongkorn University (LLB); University of Southern California (MA); Claremont Graduate University (Ph.D)

Parnpree Bahiddha-nukara (Thai: ปานปรีย์ พหิทธานุกร, RTGS: Panpri Phahitthanukon) is a Thai politician from the Pheu Thai Party who has served as Minister of Foreign Affairs from September 2023 until his resignation in April 2024

== Early life and education ==
Parnpree completed his high school education at Assumption College and went on to earn a bachelor's degree in law from Chulalongkorn University. He furthered his education by obtaining a Master of Public Administration from the University of Southern California and ultimately earned a doctorate in public administration from Claremont Graduate University in the United States.

== Career ==
Panpree began working as a civil servant at the Secretariat of the Cabinet, performing policy analysis and as a liaison officer in the Cabinet meeting room in the governments of General Prem Tinsulanonda and General Chatichai Choonhavan.

== Political career ==
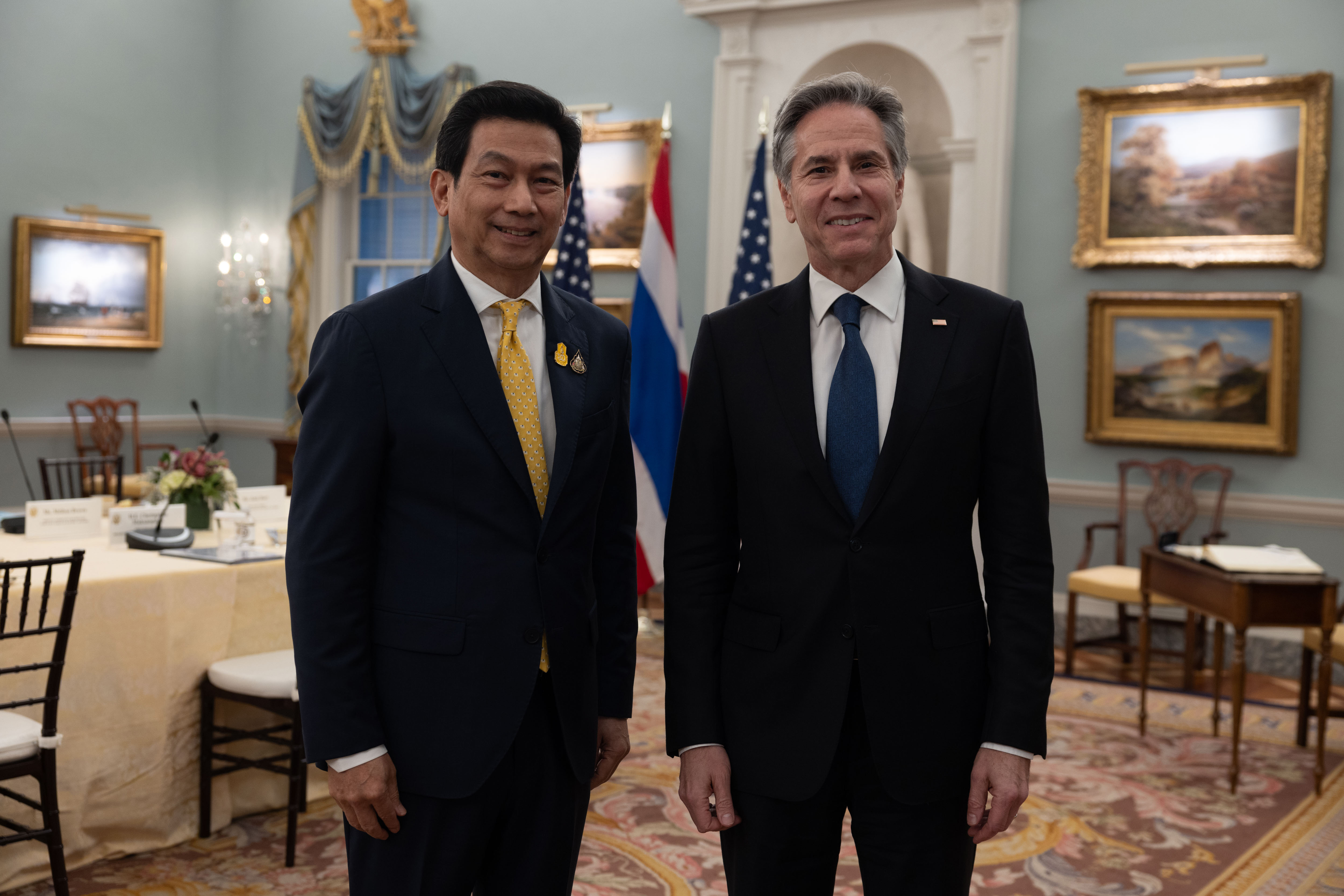
Secretary Antony Blinken meets with Thai Deputy Prime Minister and Foreign Minister Parnpree in 2024

In 1996, Parnpree was appointed as an advisor to the Prime Minister on economic and foreign affairs in the government of General Chavalit Yongchaiyudh and in 2002 became a member of the House of Representatives and Deputy Leader of the Chart Pattana Kla Party.

In 2003, he was Assistant Minister of the Ministry of Commerce. Between 2003 and 2005, he was assigned the responsibility of being the head of the negotiation team for the creation of a free trade zone with India and BIMSTEC countries. In 2004 he was Assistant Minister of the Ministry of Industry and he plays an important role in planning and solving the problem of water shortage for the industry in the Eastern Seaboard until it was successful.

In 2005, he was appointed as a Thai trade representative of the Thaksin Shinawatra government and was assigned as Chairman of the Thailand Board of Investment and Chairman of the Public Warehouse Organization.

He was subsequently named Deputy Prime Minister and assumed the position of Minister of Foreign Affairs in the 2023 Srettha Thavisin government.

On April 28, 2024, Parnpree stepped down as Minister of Foreign Affairs following his removal from the role of Deputy Prime Minister. While assuming the sole role of Minister of Foreign Affairs, he expressed dissatisfaction with Prime Minister Srettha's decision.

== Honours, decorations and awards ==
- 2005 - Knight Grand Cross of the Most Exalted Order of the White Elephant
- 2003 - Knight Grand Cross of the Most Noble Order of the Crown of Thailand
