= Next Thai general election =

Parliamentary election held in Thailand

- On or before 25 March 2030

All 500 seats in the House of Representatives 251 seats needed for a majority

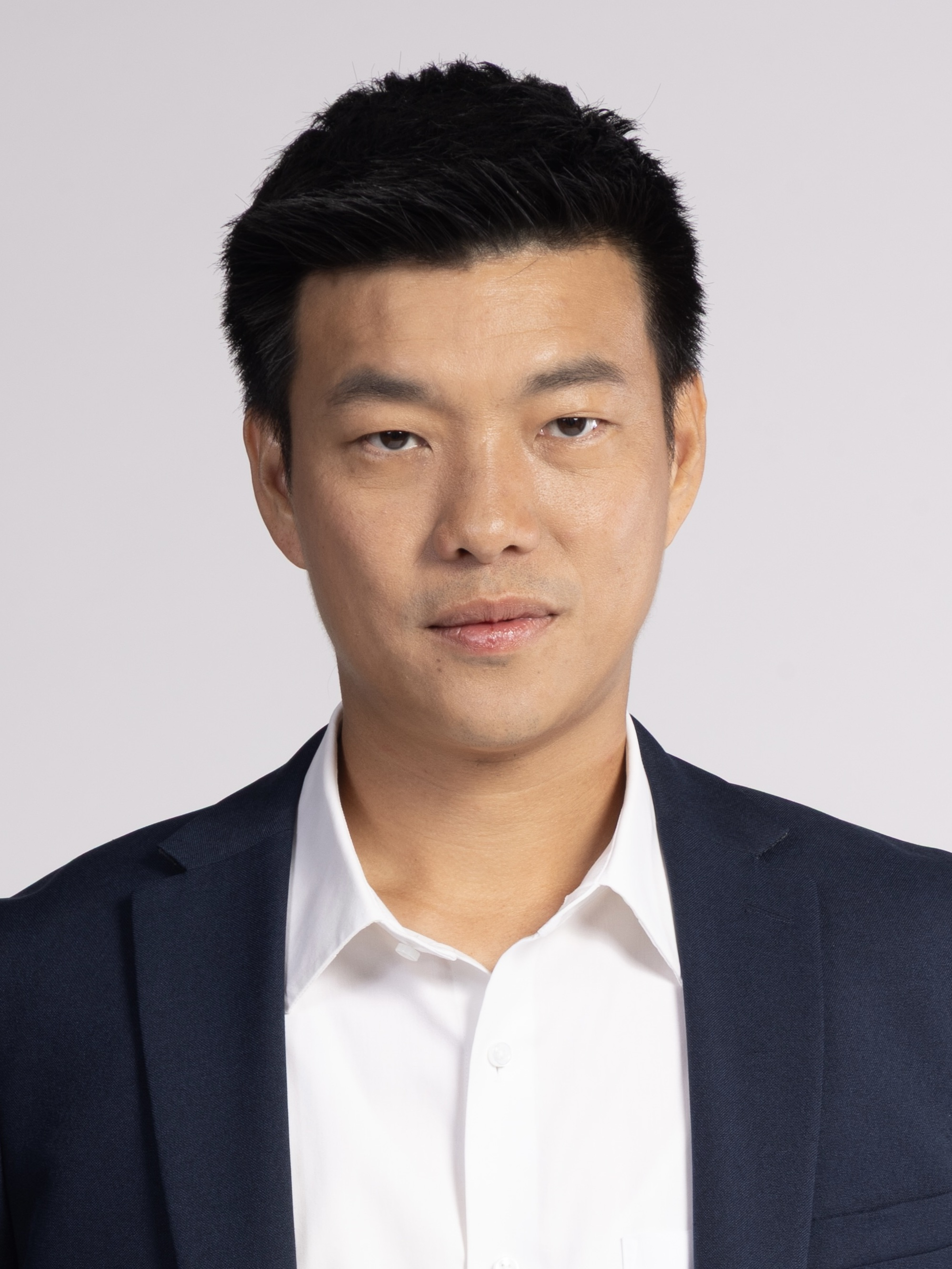

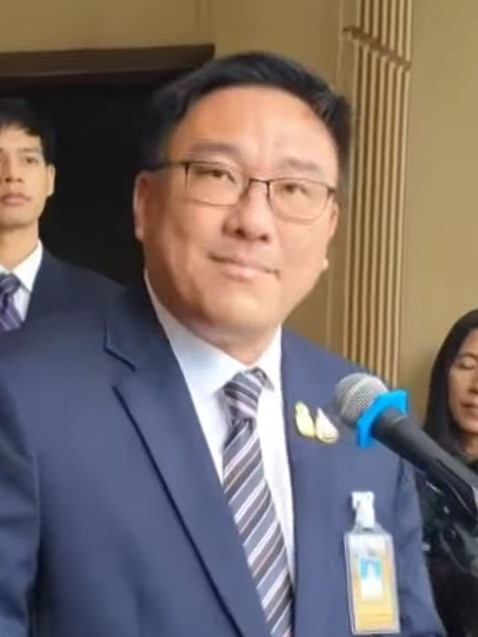

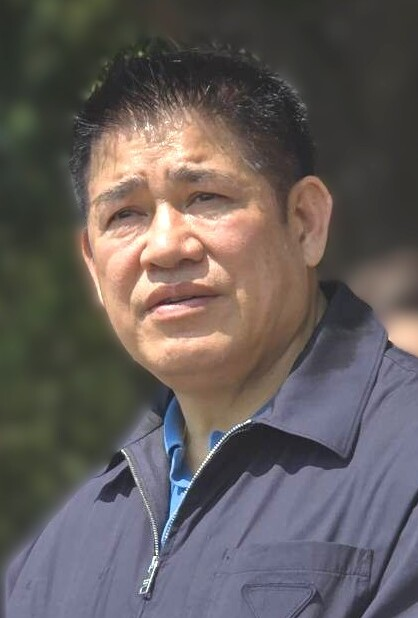

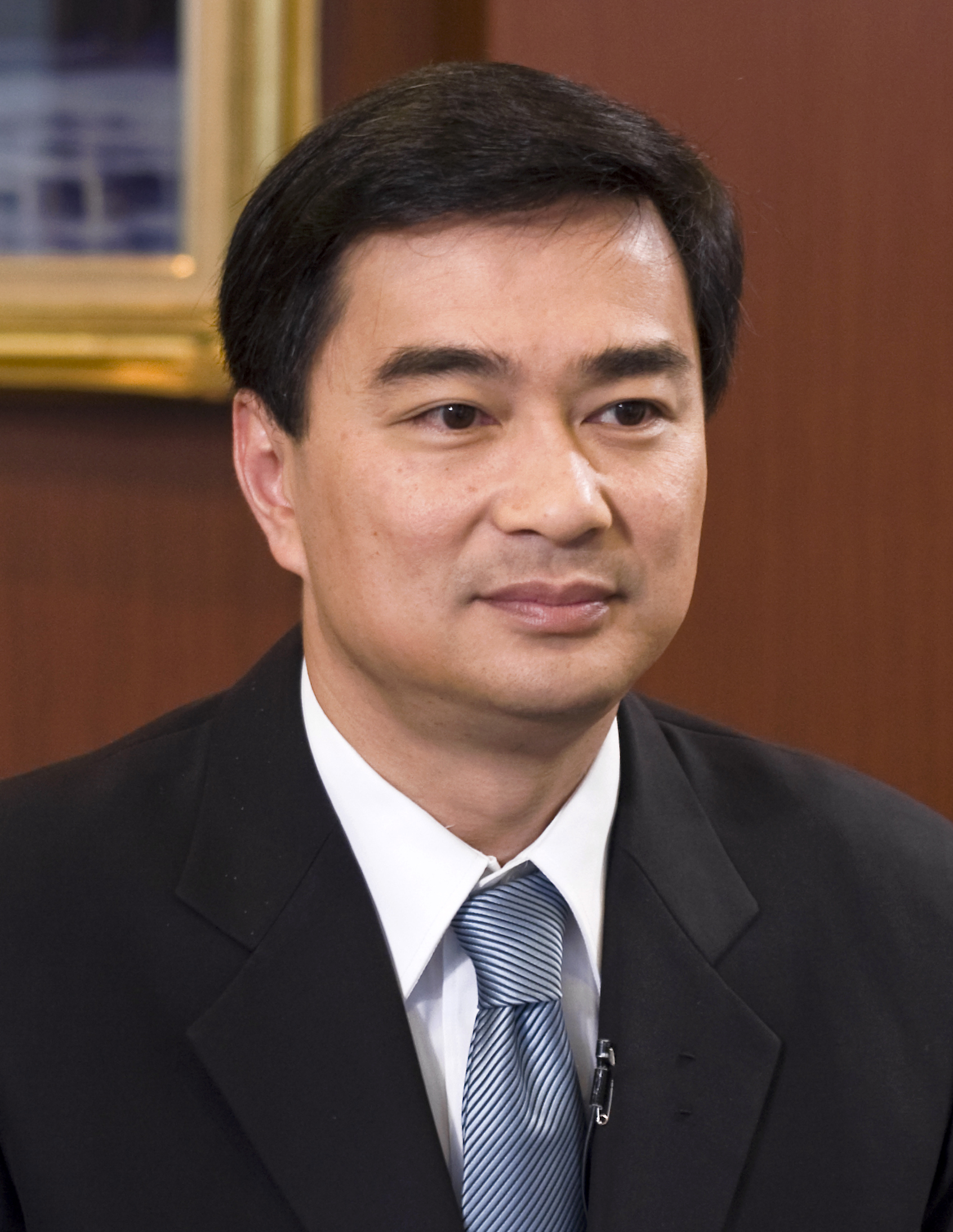

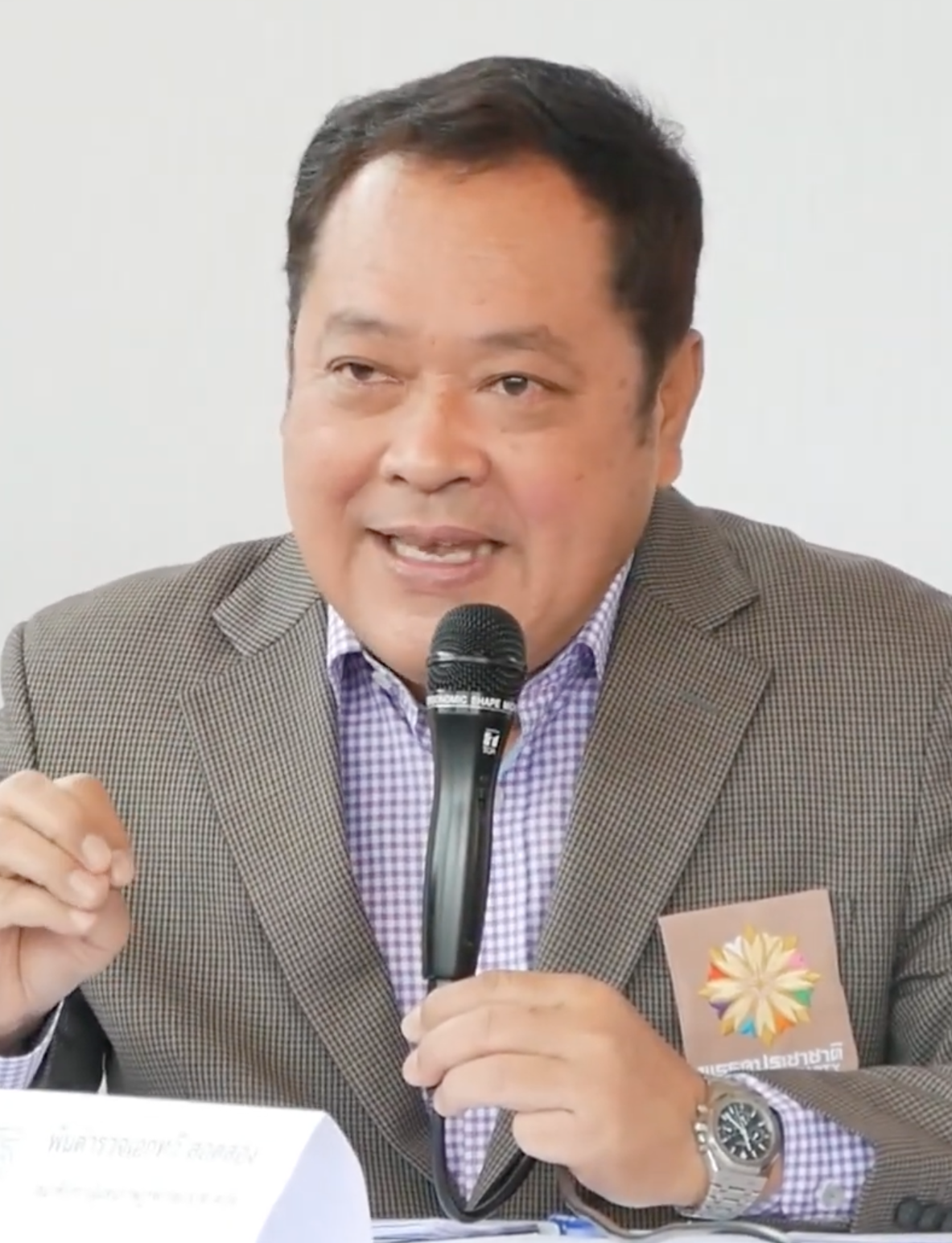

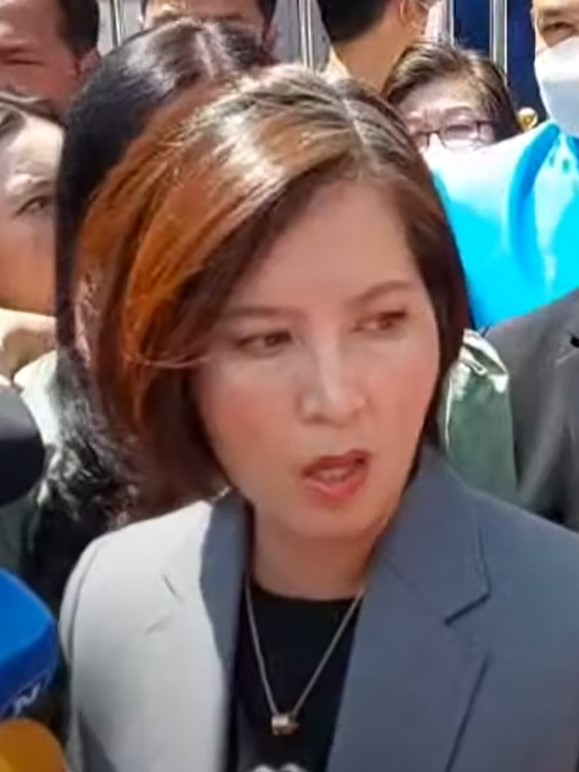

Leader	Anutin Charnvirakul	Natthaphong Ruengpanyawut	Julapun Amornvivat
Party	Bhumjaithai	People's	Pheu Thai
Last election	192 seats	120 seats	74 seats
Current seats	192	120	74
Leader	Thamanat Prompow	Abhisit Vejjajiva	Chitrawan Wangsuphakijkosol
Party	Kla Tham	Democrat	Thai Ruam Palang
Last election	58 seats	21 seats	6 seats
Current seats	57	21	6
Leader	Tawee Sodsong	Treenuch Thienthong	Rangsi Kitiyansap
Party	Prachachat	Palang Pracharath	Economic
Last election	5 seats	5 seats	3 seats
Current seats	5	5	3
Incumbent Prime Minister
Anutin Charnvirakul
Bhumjaithai

General election is scheduled to be held no later than 25 March 2030. It will determine the composition of the House of Representatives.

== Electoral system ==
As in the 2023 election, the electoral system followed that of the 2021 amendment of the 2017 constitution. The 500 members of the House of Representatives were elected by parallel voting. 400 seats were elected from single-member constituencies by first-past-the-post voting and 100 seats by proportional representation. Voters cast separate ballots for the two sets of seats.

The 100 party-list seats were distributed under the largest remainder method of proportional representation using the Hare quota, restored in 2022 after parliament failed to finalise a rival draft within its 180-day deadline. The national party-list vote is divided by 100 to give a quota; each party takes one seat for every whole quota it has won, and the seats still unfilled go to the parties with the largest fractional remainders. List seats are awarded on top of constituency seats rather than in compensation for them, so a party that sweeps the constituencies keeps its full proportional entitlement as well. Writing shortly before the system was first used, Napon Jatusripitak of the ISEAS–Yusof Ishak Institute observed that cutting the number of list seats from 150 to 100 raised the share of the vote needed to win one and allowed larger parties to take a higher proportion of seats than of votes.

== Opinion polling ==
=== Preferred party (%) ===
Abbr.	Full name
PPLE	People's Party
BJT	Bhumjaithai Party
PTP	Pheu Thai Party
Dem	Democrat Party
ECON	Economic Party
UTN	United Thai Nation Party
TPD	Thai Pakdee Party
TST	Thai Sang Thai Party
TLP	Thai Liberal Party

Fieldwork date	Polling firm	Sample size	PPLE	BJT	PTP	Dem	ECON	UTN	TPD	TST	TLP	Others	Und.	No ans.	Lead
18–23 Sep 2026	NIDA	2,500	35.40	12.08	18.44	9.80	1.52	2.16	4.68	1.80	1.72	2.76	7.64	0.20	16.96
29 Jun – 2 Jul 2026	NIDA	2,500	34.80	17.00	16.84	12.68	2.04	2.96	2.76	1.92	1.60	2.08	5.32	–	17.80
19–24 Mar 2026	NIDA	2,500	35.80	26.60	12.04	11.64	2.44	1.76	1.28	1.24	0.64	1.68	4.60	0.28	9.20
8 Feb 2026	2026 election	71.42%	30.56	17.90	15.43	10.91	3.14	2.12	0.68	0.56	0.51	15.12	3.07	–	12.66

=== Preferred prime minister (%) ===
Fieldwork date	Polling firm	Sample size	Natthaphong PPLE	Anutin BJT	Yodchanan PTP	Julapun PTP	Abhisit Dem	Warong TPD	Sudarat (Note: Resigned as leader on 12 February 2026) TST	Rewat Rak	Sereepisuth TLP	Rangsi ECON	Pirapan UTN	Prayut	Others	Undecided	Lead
18–23 Sep 2026	NIDA	2,500	24.72	13.76	11.28	1.08	9.60	5.68	2.64	2.36	2.24	1.48	1.40	1.52	2.44	19.80	4.92
29 Jun – 2 Jul 2026	NIDA	2,500	26.08	21.68	11.64	1.32	11.80	4.08	2.72		2.16	2.56	2.04	0.92	2.76	10.24	4.40
19–24 Mar 2026	NIDA	2,500	30.60	29.40	8.08	0.80	10.92	1.56	1.76		0.88	2.64	1.28	1.16	2.52	8.20	1.20
