= 2023 Thai general election =

- 14 May 2023

All 500 seats in the House of Representatives 251 seats needed for a majority
- Registered: 52,238,594
- Turnout: 75.64% (▲0.95 pp)
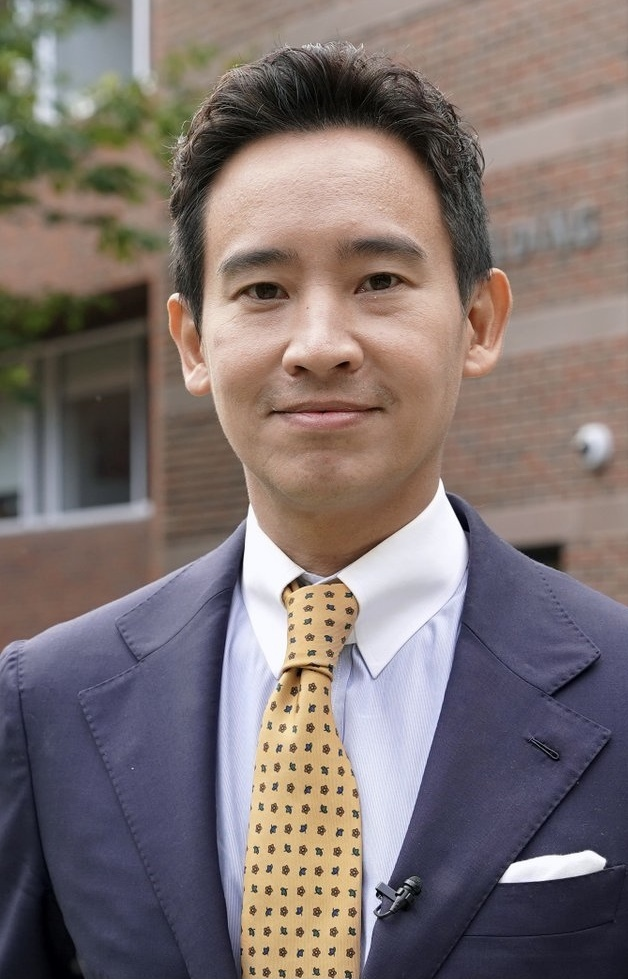

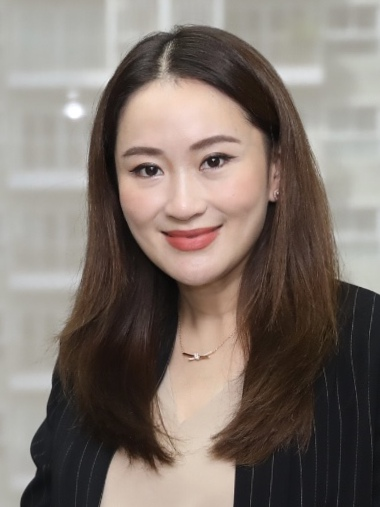

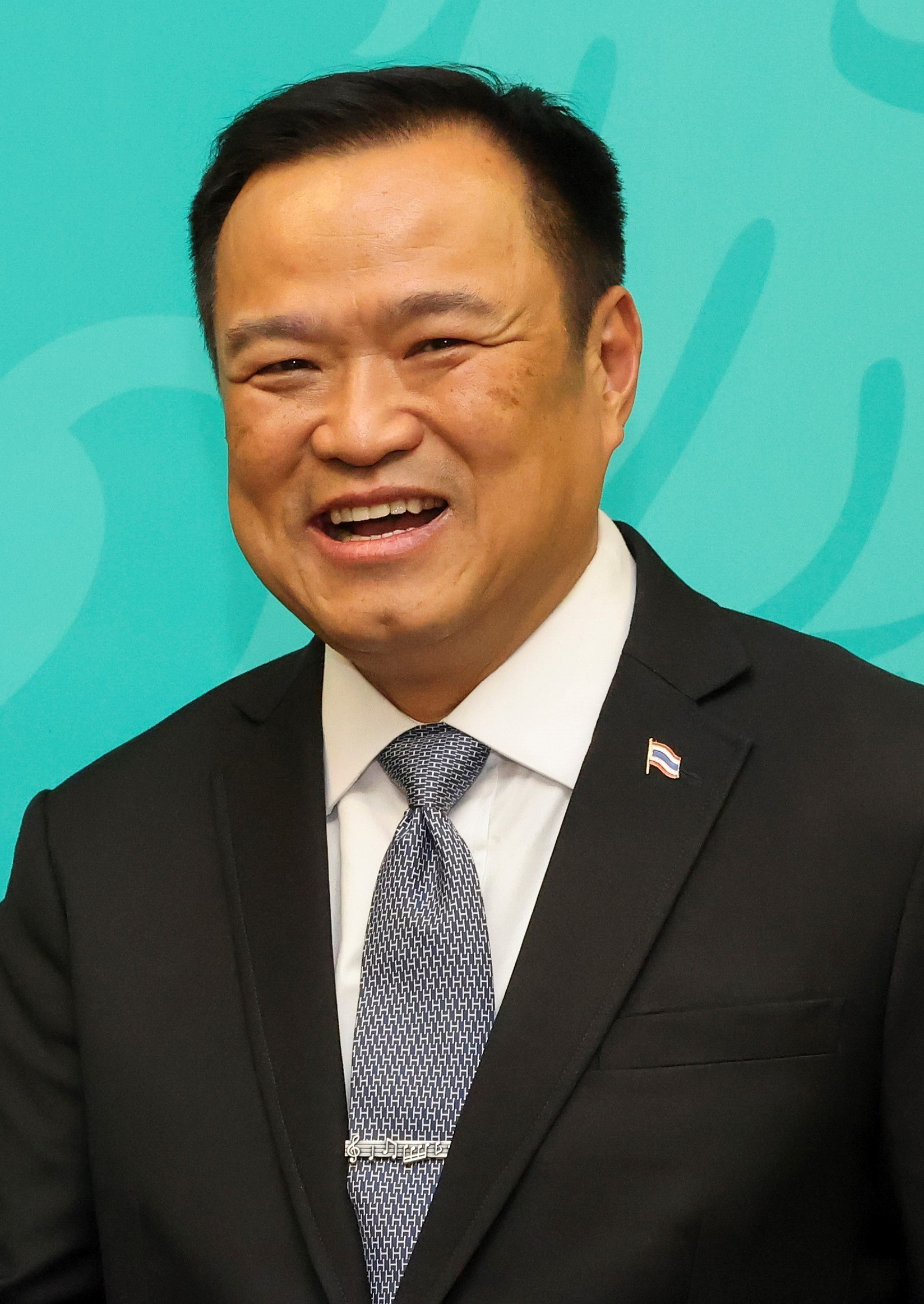

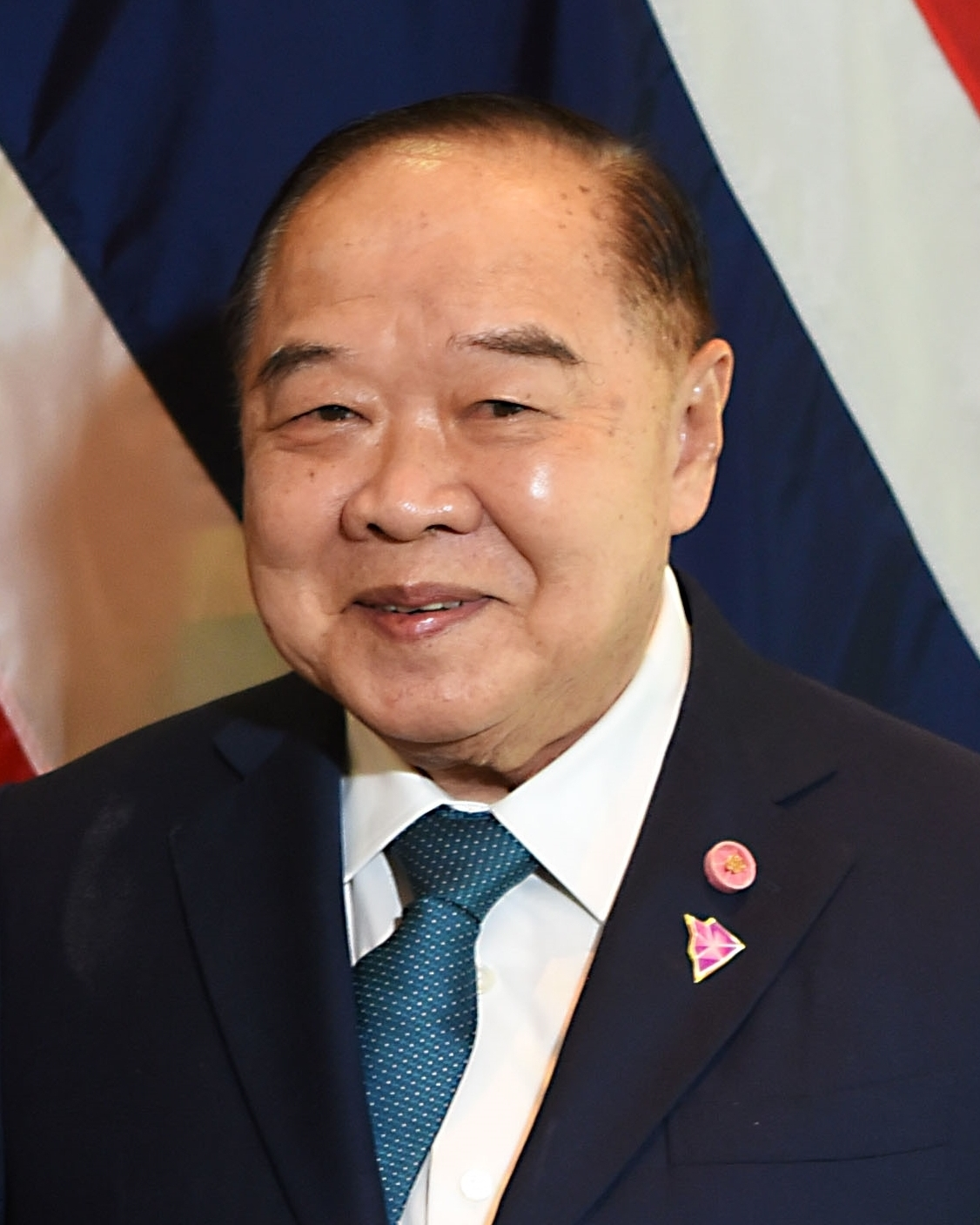

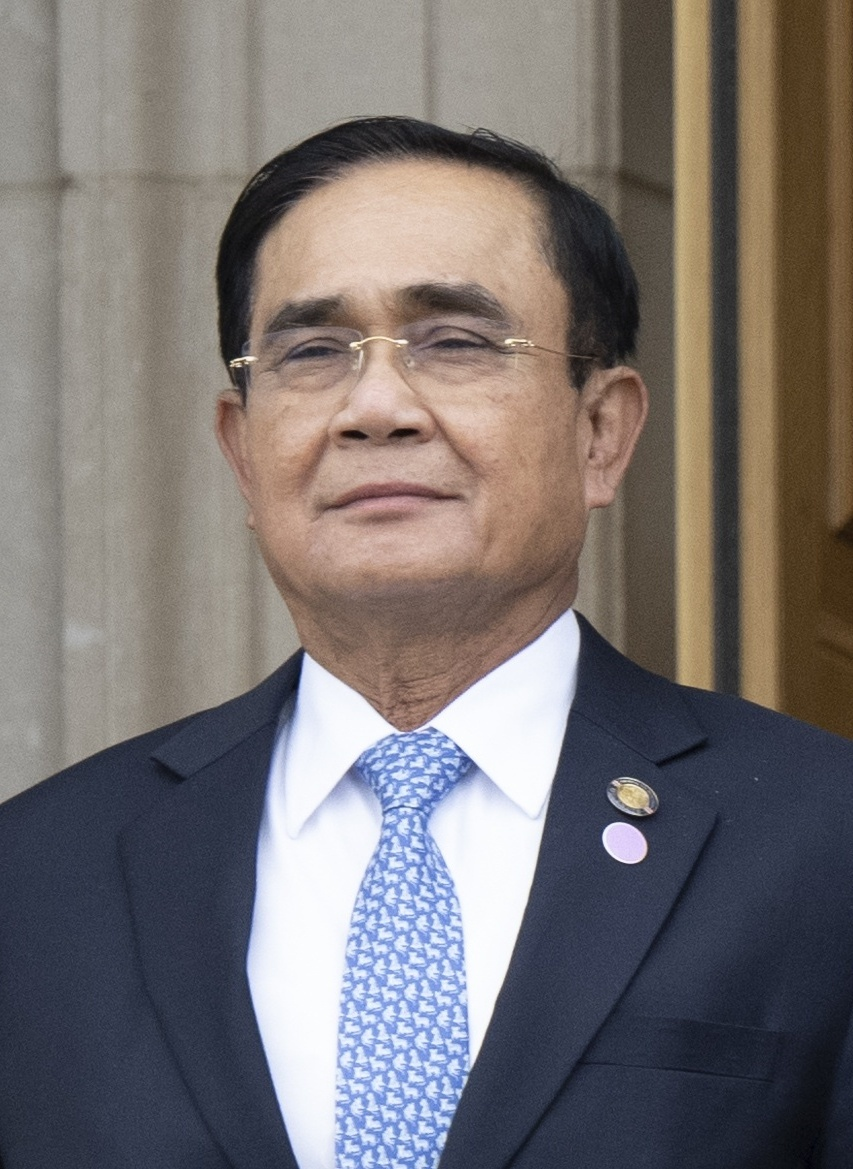

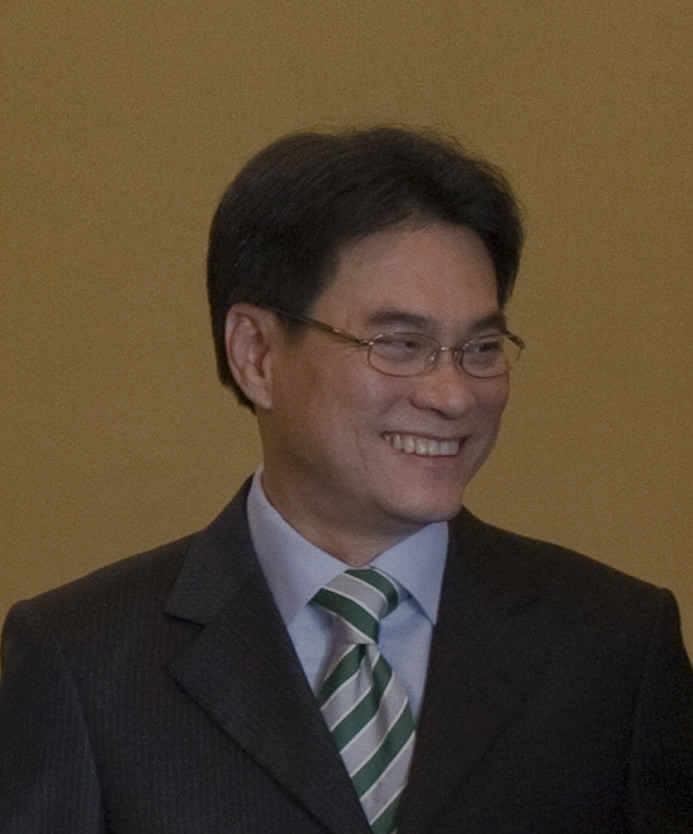
	First party	Second party	Third party
Candidate	Pita Limjaroenrat	Paetongtarn Shinawatra (Note: The Prime Ministerial candidates for the Pheu Thai Party are Paetongtarn Shinawatra, Srettha Thavisin and Chaikasem Nitisiri, however Paetongtarn Shinawatra is the lead candidate for Prime Minister.)	Anutin Charnvirakul
Party	Move Forward	Pheu Thai	Bhumjaithai
Last election	17.34%, 81 seats (Note: Contested the 2019 general election as the Future Forward Party de facto.)	21.92%, 136 seats	10.33%, 51 seats
Seats won	151	141	71
Seat change	▲70	▲5	▲20
Constituency vote	9,665,433	9,340,082	5,133,441
% and swing	25.40% (▲8.06pp)	24.54% (▲2.62pp)	13.49% (▲3.16pp)
Party-list vote	14,438,851	10,962,522	1,138,202
% and swing	37.99%	28.84%	2.99%
	Fourth party	Fifth party	Sixth party
Candidate	Prawit Wongsuwon	Prayut Chan-o-cha (Note: The Prime Ministerial candidates for the United Thai Nation Party are Prayut Chan-o-cha and Pirapan Salirathavibhaga, however Prayut Chan-o-cha is the lead candidate for Prime Minister.)	Jurin Laksanawisit
Party	Palang Pracharath	United Thai Nation	Democrat
Last election	23.34%, 116 seats	New	10.92%, 53 seats
Seats won	40	36	25
Seat change	▼76	New	▼28
Constituency vote	4,186,441	3,607,575	2,278,857
% and swing	11.00% (▼12.34pp)	9.48% (New)	5.99% (▼8.49pp)
Party-list vote	537,625	4,766,408	925,349
% and swing	1.41%	12.54%	2.43%
Prime Minister before election
Prayut Chan-o-cha
United Thai Nation
Prime Minister-designate
Srettha Thavisin
Pheu Thai

Election calendar
- 20 March: Dissolution of the House of Representatives
- 27 March – 13 April: Early voting registration date
- 3–7 April: Application date for electoral candidates
- 7 May: Early voting Day
- 14 May: Election Day

General elections were held in Thailand on 14 May 2023 to elect 500 members of the House of Representatives. The Move Forward Party, led by Pita Limjaroenrat, surprised analysts by winning the most seats, followed by fellow opposition party Pheu Thai who had won the most seats in the 2011 and 2019 elections. Turnout was a record 75.22%.

The elections were held using a parallel voting system as in the 1997 and 2007 constitutions, in contrast to the mixed-member apportionment system used in 2019. Like in 2019, the elected prime minister did not need to be a member of the House and would be chosen by the full National Assembly, including the 250 military-appointed members of the Senate, for a total 376-seat majority. Due to the structure of the National Assembly, experts had warned of a possible gridlock scenario in which the current opposition parties secure more than half of the House votes but are obstructed in the Senate. Additionally, the Election Commission had received criticism over untrustworthiness, unprofessionalism, and bias in its conducting of the voting process.

Sixty-seven parties vied for seats. The ruling conservative coalition government was composed of the major Palang Pracharath, Bhumjai Thai, and Democrat parties, and smaller parties including the new United Thai Nation Party, who nominated former junta leader and incumbent prime minister Prayut Chan-o-cha after his split with Palang Pracharath. The pro-democratic opposition was led by the Pheu Thai and Move Forward parties, the latter being the effective successor of the dissolved Future Forward Party, which had performed unexpectedly well in the 2019 election. Political campaigns focused on the Thai economy, especially its recovery from the COVID-19 pandemic. Some parties, most notably Move Forward, also highlighted progressive issues, and challenged long-held social norms in Thailand.

Pita's Move Forward initially formed a coalition with the other pro-democracy, anti-military parties, which had a majority in the lower house but was unable to form a government after being functionally blocked by allies of the monarchy and military in the Senate. Pheu Thai then assumed the lead, dissolving its alliance with Move Forward and allying instead with conservative, pro-military parties. It then nominated real estate tycoon Srettha Thavisin as prime minister. He was elected by Parliament on 22 August.

On August 7, 2024, Thailand's Constitutional Court banned the victors of the election, the Move Forward Party and all of its leaders from politics for its proposal to reform the lèse-majesté law, arguing it posed a threat to the constitutional order.

== Background ==
Following a political crisis in Thailand, the military staged a coup d'état in 2014, ousting the civilian caretaker government of Yingluck Shinawatra. The military junta, known as the National Council for Peace and Order (NCPO), rose to power under the leadership of former army chief Prayut Chan-o-cha as Prime Minister. In 2016, the NCPO completed the drafting of a new constitution and held a referendum to approve it. They banned criticism of the draft constitution and prohibited monitoring of the referendum. Activists against the document were arrested, detained, and prosecuted in military courts, whilst voters who expressed their intention to vote against the draft were also arrested and prosecuted by the military regime.

In 2019, after numerous delays, the junta finally held a general election on 24 March. The elections were seen as a skewed race in which Prayut had an unfair advantage, with the Senate wholly appointed by the junta and the constituencies redrawn last-minute. After the election, the pro-junta Palang Pracharath party formed a coalition government, with Prayut selected by the parliament for another term as prime minister even though his party did not win the most seats.

Prayut began his second term as prime minister on 9 June 2019. According to the current constitution, a prime minister can only serve for a maximum of eight years. However, the end of Prayut's term as the prime minister of Thailand is disputed since there are many interpretations about the beginning of his term. On 30 September 2022, the Constitutional Court finally ruled that Prayut's term began in 2017 along with the new constitution, meaning that he may serve as the prime minister until 2025, if he is selected by the parliament again.

The 2020–2021 nationwide protests started as demonstrations against the premiership of Prayuth but later expanded to include numerous long-overlooked issues in Thai society, and unprecedented demands to reform the monarchy. The Thai royal family is protected by a lèse-majesté law. Even though the protests largely died down due to crackdown, repression, and COVID-19 restrictions, it was anticipated that activism could resurge in this election and afterwards.

The end of 2022 saw the split in the ruling Palang Pracharath Party between Prayut and his close associate Prawit Wongsuwon, after the latter showed accommodation towards the main opposition Pheu Thai Party. Prayut was expected to join the new United Thai Nation Party along with his loyalists in the Palang Pracharath Party. Forty politicians, including 34 incumbent MPs from both coalition and opposition camps, also resigned from their parties to join Bhumjai Thai Party to increase their winning chances in this election. On 23 December 2022, Prayut announced his intention to apply for membership of the United Thai Nation Party, as well as becoming the party's sole prime ministerial candidate.

Rumor of a possible coup was circulated long before the election. In September 2022, a cabinet minister, Chaiwut Thanakamanusorn, warned that protesting may result in the cancellation of the election.

== Electoral system ==
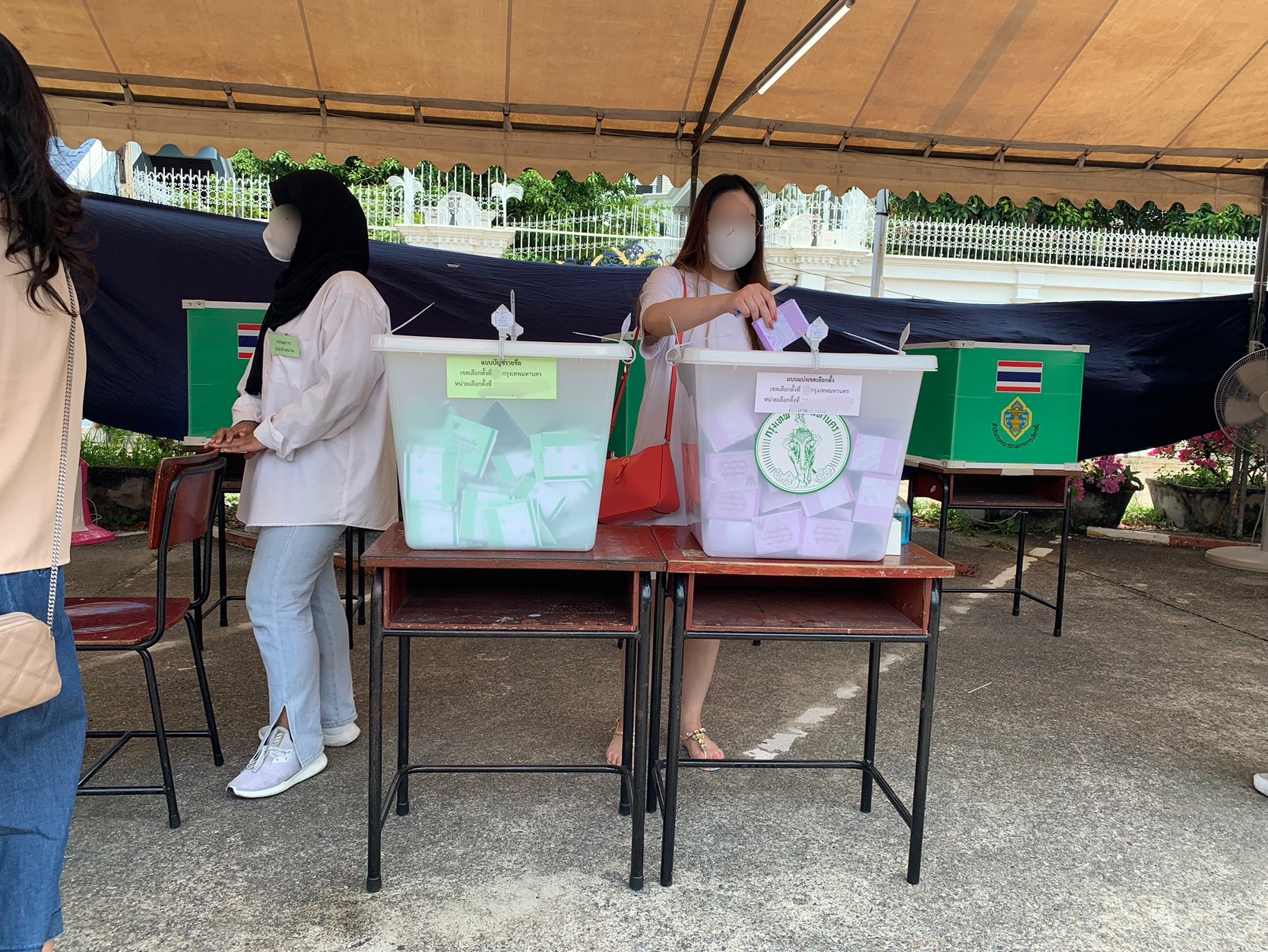
A polling station in Bangkok on 14 May 2023, note the two separate boxes for each of the ballots

Unlike the preceding 2019 election, which used a form of mixed-member proportional representation with 350 constituency seats and the remaining 150 being levelling seats, the electoral system was changed in a 2021 amendment of the constitution which restored the pre-2017 parallel voting system and removed the proportional representation mechanism.

Of the 500 members of the House of Representatives to be elected, 400 seats were elected from single-member constituencies by first-past-the-post voting (an increase of 50), and 100 party-list seats—filled separately and no longer serving as leveling seats—are voted on in a separate ballot (unlike in the 2019 election, where only one vote was cast by each voter to determine both constituency and levelling seats). The change was criticised by smaller parties as the system benefits larger parties—especially the ruling Palang Pracharath Party and the main opposition party Pheu Thai, who both supported the amendment—at the expense of smaller ones, including the progressive Move Forward Party, whose predecessor Future Forward performed successfully in 2019 thanks to the proportional representation system.

=== Prime ministerial candidates ===
The process of selecting a prime minister is still the same as the preceding 2019 election under the 2017 Thai constitution. Prime ministers may only be chosen from a pre-declared list of candidates. Each party may submit up to three names and must have at least 5% (25 members) in the House of Representatives to receive eligibility. Candidates do not have to be a member of parliament (MP).

Move Forward Party	Pheu Thai Party			Bhumjaithai Party
Pita Limjaroenrat	Paetongtarn Shinawatra	Srettha Thavisin	Chaikasem Nitisiri	Anutin Chanrnvirakul
Member of Parliament (2019–2024)	Director of the Thaicom Foundation (since 2007)	President of Sansiri Public Company Limited (2021–2023)	Minister of Justice (2013–2014)	Deputy Prime Minister (2019–2025)

Palang Pracharath Party	United Thai Nation Party		Democrat Party
Prawit Wongsuwon	Prayut Chan-o-cha	Pirapan Salirathavibhaga	Jurin Laksanawisit
Deputy Prime Minister (2014–2023)	Prime Minister (2014–2023)	Minister of Justice (2008–2011)	Deputy Prime Minister (2019–2023)

Parliament's vote for prime minister will take place in a joint session with the 250-seat Senate appointed by the junta, according to the constitution's provisional terms. In 2019, all the senators unanimously voted for then-junta leader Prayut. As the term of the NCPO-appointed Senate lasts until 2024, it is expected to exert influence into this election as well.

Due to this rule, the anti-junta camp had to secure at least 376 votes in order to select their candidates, while a simple majority in the House could still result in a candidate from the pro-junta coalition winning the selection. If no candidates secured at least 376 votes in the Parliament, it could lead to a deadlock and pave the way for a person not in the parties' list of candidates becoming prime minister as written in the Constitution. Such a scenario led some to call for strategic voting for larger anti-junta parties most likely to win in each constituency.

=== 2022 reapportionment and redistricting ===
Due to the increase of the number of members of the House of Representatives elected from single-member constituencies from 350 to 400, a reapportionment of seats and redrawing of electoral boundaries was required. On 1 February 2022, the Election Commission announced its calculations that, from the total registered population of 66,171,439 as of 31 December 2021, there must be 1 member per 165,429 people. This distribution is subject to the approval of the organic law bills currently being considered by the National Assembly.

The provisional number of members of the House of Representatives to be elected from single-member constituencies in each province are as follows:

Province	MPs per province
Bangkok	33
Nakhon Ratchasima	16
Khon Kaen, Ubon Ratchathani	11
Chiang Mai, Chon Buri, Buriram, Nakhon Si Thammarat, Udon Thani	10
Sisaket, Songkhla	9
Nonthaburi, Roi Et, Samut Prakan, Surin	8
Chaiyaphum, Chiang Rai, Pathum Thani, Sakon Nakhon, Surat Thani	7
Kalasin, Nakhon Pathom, Nakhon Sawan, Phetchabun, Maha Sarakham	6
Kanchanaburi, Lop Buri, Narathiwat, Pattani, Phra Nakhon Si Ayutthaya, Phitsanulok, Rayong, Ratchaburi, Suphan Buri	5
Kamphaeng Phet, Chachoengsao, Trang, Nakhon Phanom, Lampang, Loei, Sara Buri, Sukhothai	4
Krabi, Chanthaburi, Chumphon, Nan, Bueng Kan, Prachuap Khiri Khan, Prachin Buri, Phayao, Phatthalung, Phichit, Phetchaburi, Phrae, Phuket, Yasothon, Yala, Sa Kaeo, Tak, Nong Khai, Nong Bua Lamphu, Samut Sakhon, Uttaradit	3
Chai Nat, Nakhon Nayok, Phang Nga, Mukdahan, Mae Hong Son, Lamphun, Satun, Ang Thong, Amnat Charoen, Uthai Thani	2
Trat, Ranong, Samut Songkhram, Sing Buri	1
Total	400

Some voting districts drawn by the Election Commission, such as Bangkok's 28th district shown above, were atypically composed of various parts of different khet; the commission was accused of gerrymandering.

The Election Commission had just finished drawing electoral boundaries in February 2023—just three months before the election, while many candidates had already begun campaigning. The original drawing was challenged in the Constitutional Court as the Commission included non-citizens in the calculation. The Court struck down the drawing, prompting the commission to revise and present another boundary drawing. The second drawing was also challenged in the administrative courts amid the accusation of gerrymandering by the commission, but the court eventually ruled the drawing was legal in April 2023.

== Leading up to the election ==
Since late 2022, ex-politician Chuwit Kamolvisit began attacking Prayut whose relative was allegedly linked to Chinese nationals involving drug, gambling and money laundering. He later turned to Bhumjai Thai Party, accusing it of corruption regarding Orange Line rapid transit planning and promoting unrestricted use of marijuana.

In January 2023, two youth political activists began a hunger strike calling for the release of political prisoners detained before trial. Many of them were charged with lèse-majesté, which led to another debate on amending or cancellation of the law. Political parties were asked for their stance on the issue.

Beginning in January 2023, many civil society organizations called for volunteers to keep their eyes on the election process, citing the untrustworthiness of the Election Commission and its decision not to report the election result in real-time. As of March 2023, the movement had grown to 50 organizations, including media, who declared they would report the unofficial election result when the commission would not.

On 20 March 2023, the House of Representatives was dissolved—three days before the term ended. Due to a legal technicality, the election date was postponed for another week from 7 May 2023. The move also allowed politicians more time to switch parties, which many analysts interpreted as the real motive behind it. Some commentators also noticed that the election day was set during the period of university exams and after a long holiday which could make voting inconvenient for a lot of Thais who have to return to vote in their constituencies.

In March 2023, a group of hackers posted the personal data of 55 million Thais for sale online. The group called 9Near with a symbol resembling that of the Move Forward Party, also mentioned on their page: "Almost election, choose wisely."

In May, ex-prime minister Thaksin Shinawatra tweeted that he was ready to return to Thailand before July 2023 and "enter the legal process". He faced possible prison time from prior convictions.

The Thai economy was still recovering from the COVID-19 pandemic, but it was still struggling with multiple issues, including high energy and electricity costs, the number of employers still fewer than before the pandemic, rising household debts, and falling income growth. Other economic issues such as minimum wage, farm subsidies, and welfare were considered top voting issues. Most political parties campaigned on subsidies and tax exemptions.

== Contesting parties ==
A total of 67 political parties applied to participate in the elections by party list system, of which 49 party numbers are selected by lottery and then in order of the application period.

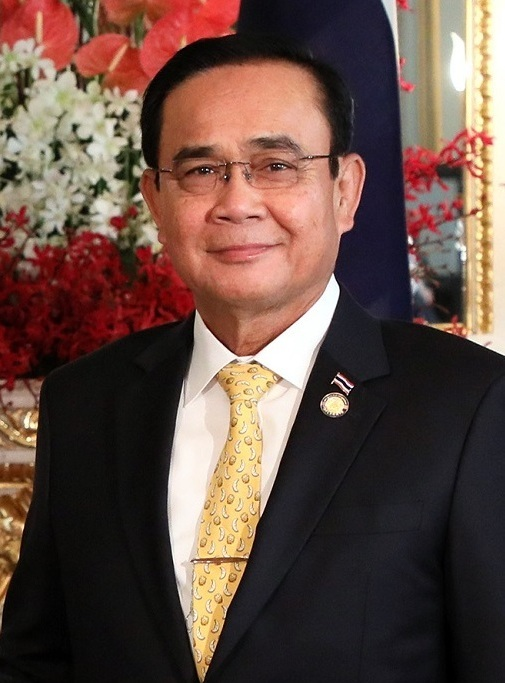
Incumbent prime minister and United Thai Nation lead candidate for PM Prayut Chan-o-cha

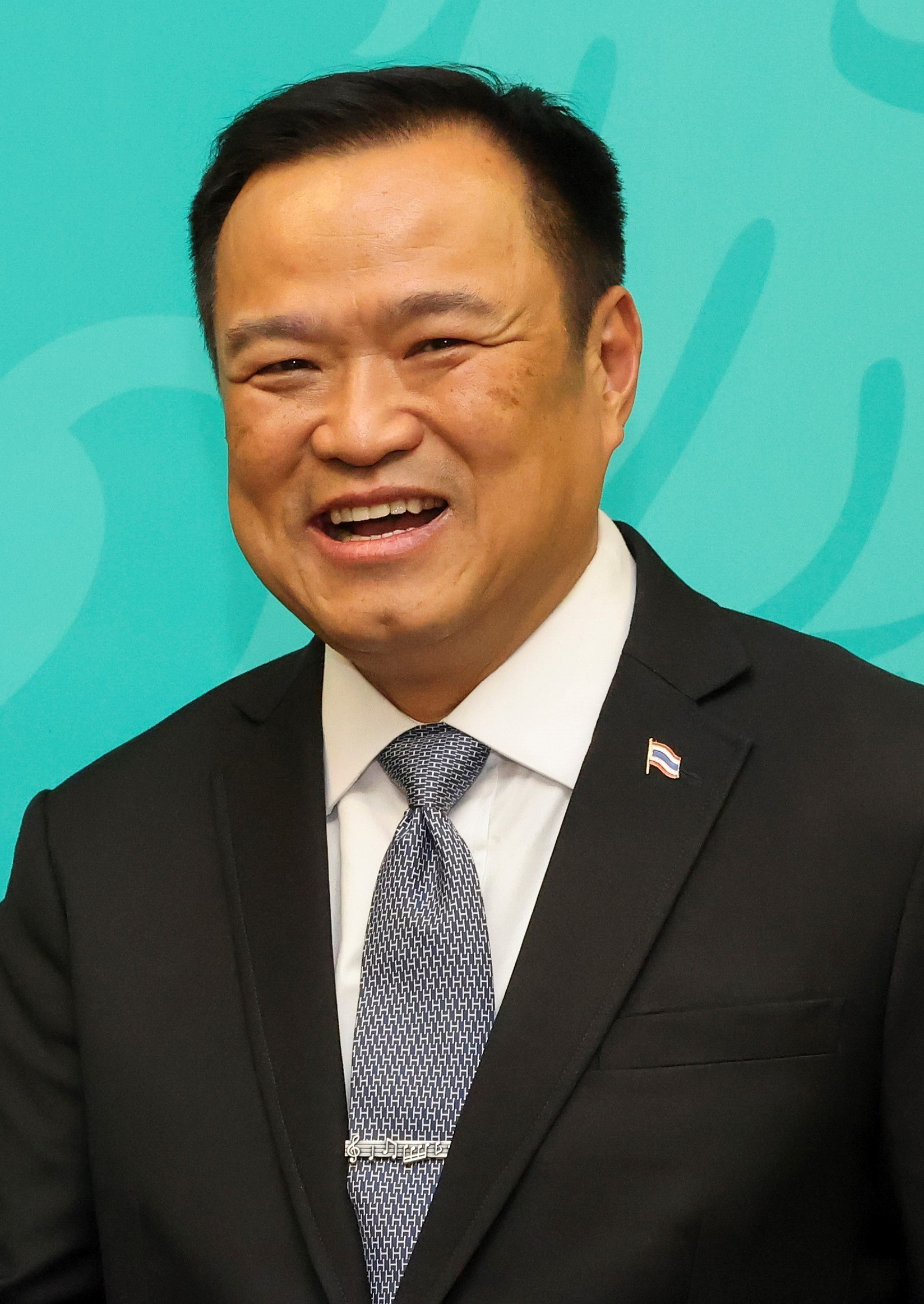
Bhumjaithai leader Anutin Charnvirakul

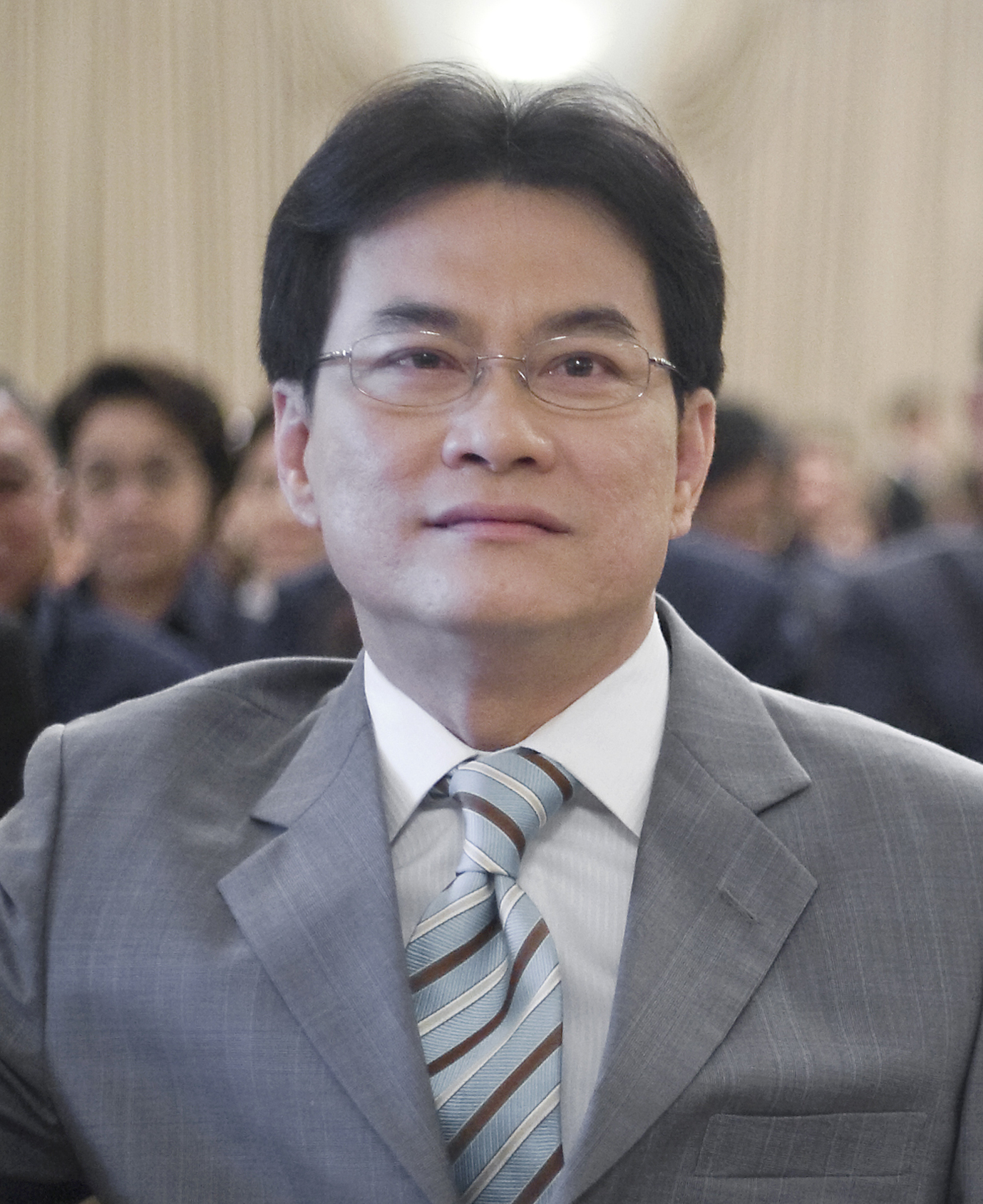
Democrat Party leader Jurin Laksanawisit

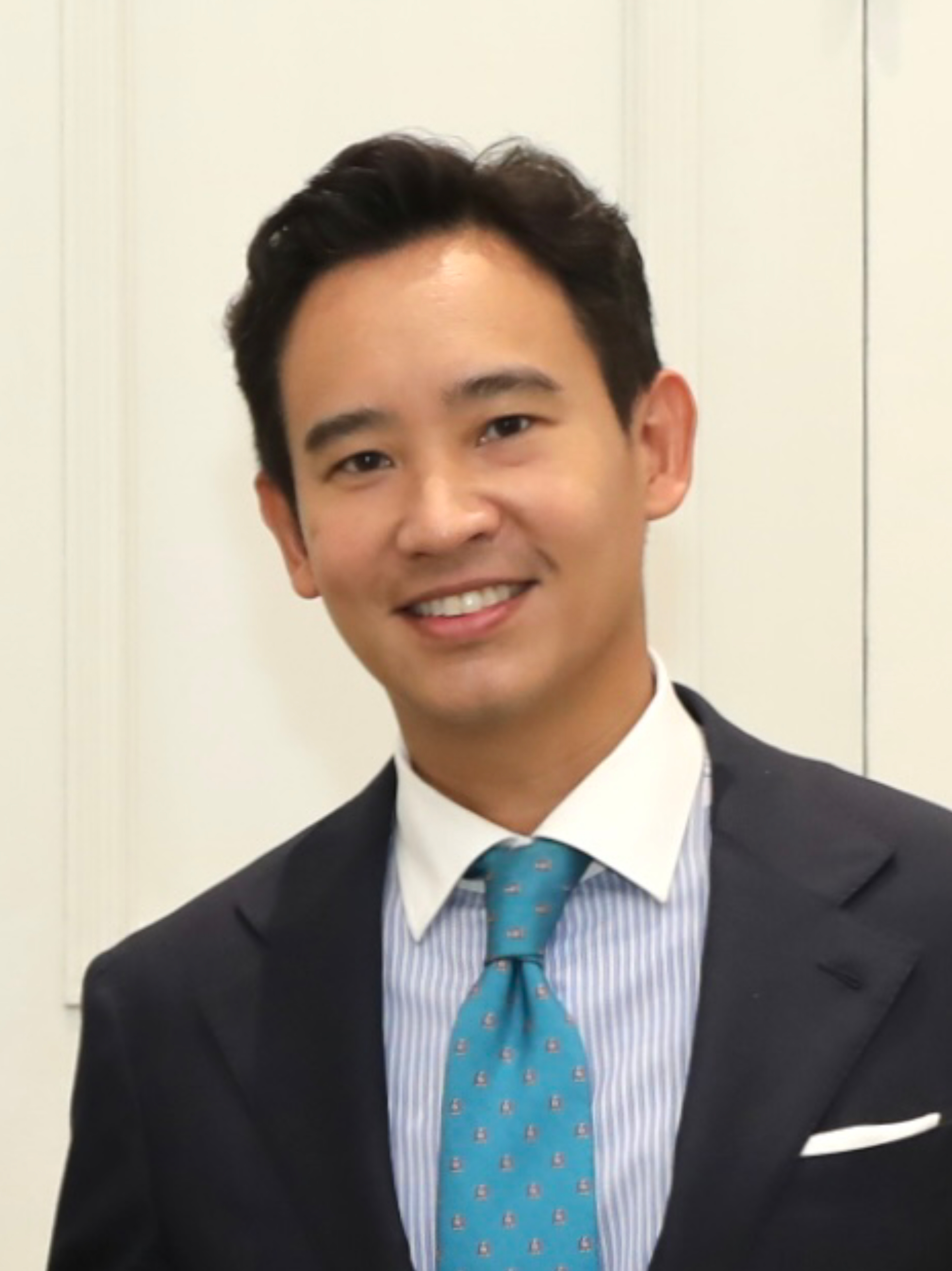
Move Forward leader Pita Limjaroenrat

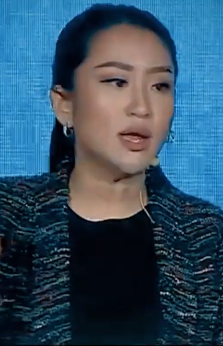
Pheu Thai lead candidate for PM Paetongtarn Shinawatra

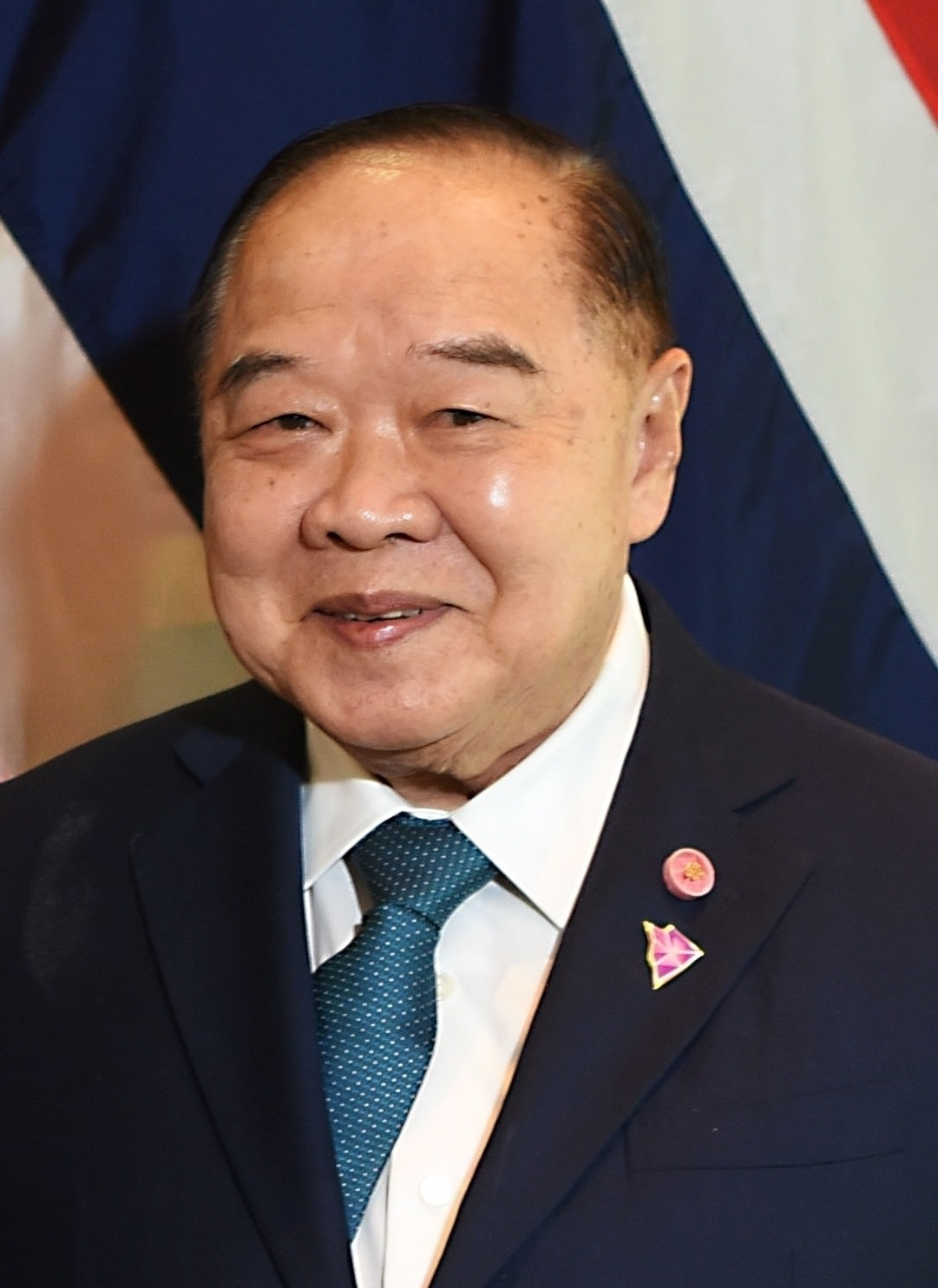
Palang Pracharath leader Prawit Wongsuwon

#	Name	Candidates
1	New Party	10
2	New Democracy Party	15
3	Fair Party	9
4	Party of Thai Counties	14
5	New Social Power Party	27
6	Thai Teachers for People Party	58
7	Bhumjaithai Party	98
8	Nation Building Labour Party	11
9	Power Party	13
10	Thailand's Future Party	1
11	Prachachart Party	68
12	Thai Ruam Thai Party	12
13	Thai Chana Party	39
14	Chart Pattana Kla Party	39
15	Green Party	14
16	Siamese Power Party	6
17	Equality Party	41
18	Chart Thai Pattana Party	87
19	Thai Network Party	3
20	Change Party	13
21	Thai Pakdee Party	28
22	United Thai Nation Party	100
23	Ruam Jai Thai Party	14
24	For the Nation Party	38
25	Thai Liberal Party	57
26	Democrat Party	98
27	New Palangdharma Party	11
28	Thai Prompt Party	27
29	Pheu Thai Party	100
30	New Alternative Party	11
31	Move Forward Party	92
32	Thai Sang Thai Party	95
33	Thai One Party	23
34	Land of Dharma Party	6
35	Action Coalition Party	23
36	Pheu Chart Thai Party	32
37	Palang Pracharath Party	85
38	Pheu Thai Ruam Palang Party	19
39	New Dimension Party	30
40	People Progressive Party	17
41	Thai Morality Party	14
42	Thai Civilized Party	21
43	Cooperative Power Party	6
44	Rat Withi Party	10
45	The New Way Party	13
46	Thinkakhao Chaovilai Party	13
47	Thailand Together Party	30
48	For the Thai Future Party	15
49	Thai Forest Conservation Party	5
50	Thai People Power Party	14
51	Commoners' Party	6
52	Chat Rung Rueang Party	11
53	Social Power Party	14
54	Paradonraphab Party	6
55	Thai Progress Party	13
56	Thai Population Party	14
57	Power Thai Party	12
58	Thai Social Democratic Party	5
59	Save the Nation Party	10
60	New Aspiration Party	24
61	Klong Thai Party	56
62	Palang Thai Rak Chart Party	4
63	Thai Citizen Party	24
64	Zen-Dai Party	11
65	Future Change Party	22
66	Democratic Force Party	4
67	Thai Smart Party	27

== Overseas and advanced voting ==
More than 2 million Thais registered for advance voting, while other 100,000 people registered to vote from overseas. Thailand's Ministry of Foreign Affairs reported that around 80% of the eligible overseas voters had done so. Even with high temperatures, some districts still expected a 90% turnout.

The Election Commission's conduct of advance voting drew sharp criticism from the public, especially from numerous cases of incorrect information on ballot envelops. Chuvit Kamolvisit also pointed out irregularities in some Northeastern provinces where unusually high number of voters voted in advance and there were reports of collection of ID cards. More than a million people also signed an online petition to oust the Election Commission.

== Opinion polls ==
=== Preferred party ===
Graph of opinion polls conducted. Trend lines represent local regressions.

Fieldwork date(s)	Polling firm	Sample	PPRP	PTP	MFP ↑ FFP	Dem	BJT	TLP	CTP	CPK	Kla	TST	UTN	Undecided	Others	Lead
9 – 12 May 2023	KPI	1,540	7.80%	29.13%	29.25%	4.27%	7.78%	–	–	–			14.13%	–	7.64%	0.12%
24 April – 3 May 2023	Nation	114,457	3.18%	39.83%	29.18%	3.97%	4.84%	0.82%	0.68%	0.34%		0.99%	7.45%	7.09%	1.63%	10.65%
24 – 28 April 2023	NIDA	2,500	1.28%	37.92%	35.36%	3.32%	2.36%	1.60%	–	1.00%		1.68%	12.84%	1.24%	1.40%	2.56%
22 – 28 April 2023	Daily News X Matichon	78,583	2.46%	33.65%	50.29%	1.05%	0.70%	1.01%	0.26%	1.60%		1.01%	6.05%	0.96%	0.96%	16.64%
10 – 20 April 2023	Suan Dusit	162,454	7.49%	41.37%	19.32%	7.30%	9.55%	1.74%	1.25%	–		2.41%	8.48%	–	1.09%	22.05%
6 – 20 April 2023	Thairath News	14,140	1.34%	40.38%	36.49%	2.35%	1.52%	0.58%	0.45%	–		0.81%	12.51%	3.58%	–	3.89%
8 – 14 April 2023	Daily News X Matichon	84,076	1.55%	38.89%	32.37%	1.83%	3.30%	1.63%	–	1.14%		1.73%	12.84%	2.21%	2.51%	6.52%
7 – 12 April 2023	Nation	39,687	1.58%	35.75%	16.02%	3.50%	3.80%	0.69%	0.18%	0.84%		0.71%	4.50%	32.27%	0.16%	3.48%
3 – 7 April 2023	NIDA	2,000	1.80%	47.00%	21.85%	4.50%	3.00%	2.65%	–	1.55%		2.10%	11.40%	2.35%	3.60%	25.15%
1 – 17 March 2023	Suan Dusit	10,614	7.11%	46.16%	15.43%	7.71%	11.12%	0.41%	–	0.53%		1.43%	8.73%	–	1.37%	30.73%
2 – 8 March 2023	NIDA	2,000	2.30%	49.85%	17.15%	4.95%	2.55%	2.85%	–	–		2.60%	12.15%	2.35%	3.25%	32.70%
17 – 22 December 2022	NIDA	2,000	4.00%	42.95%	16.60%	5.35%	5.25%	3.40%	–	1.35%		3.25%	6.95%	8.30%	2.60%	26.35%
15 – 21 September 2022	NIDA	2,500	5.56%	34.44%	13.56%	7.56%	2.32%	2.56%	–	1.00%		3.04%	Did not exist	24.00%	5.96%	20.88%
20 – 23 June 2022	NIDA	2,500	7.00%	36.36%	17.88%	6.32%	2.56%	3.04%	–	–	2.68%	2.96%	Did not exist	18.68%	2.52%	18.48%
10 – 15 March 2022	NIDA	2,020	7.03%	25.89%	16.24%	7.97%	1.88%	2.28%	–	–	1.83%	2.18%	Did not exist	28.86%	5.84%	2.97%
15 – 21 December 2021	NIDA	2,504	8.99%	23.52%	13.18%	7.15%	1.32%	2.43%	–	–	1.08%	1.60%	Did not exist	37.14%	3.59%	13.62%
20 – 23 September 2021	NIDA	2,018	9.51%	22.50%	15.11%	7.78%	1.14%	2.68%	–	–	1.39%	1.93%	Did not exist	30.82%	7.14%	8.32%
11 – 16 June 2021	NIDA	2,515	10.70%	19.48%	14.51%	9.54%	2.43%	2.90%	–	–	1.71%	2.47%	Did not exist	32.68%	3.58%	13.20%
23 – 26 March 2021	NIDA	2,522	16.65%	22.13%	13.48%	7.10%	3.25%	3.81%	1.03%	–	–	Did not exist	Did not exist	29.82%	2.73%	7.69%
20 – 23 December 2020	NIDA	2,533	17.80%	23.61%	14.92%	7.46%	1.82%	3.00%	0.55%	0.24%	0.95%	Did not exist	Did not exist	26.49%	3.16%	2.88%
18 – 23 September 2020	NIDA	2,527	12.39%	19.39%	12.70%	7.44%	1.58%	1.70%	0.36%	0.28%	0.79%	Did not exist	Did not exist	41.59%	2.14%	22.20%
22 – 24 June 2020	NIDA	2,517	15.73%	20.70%	13.47%	7.75%	1.43%	2.50%	0.36%	0.11%	1.11%	Did not exist	Did not exist	32.38%	4.46%	11.68%
18 – 20 December 2019	NIDA	2,511	16.69%	19.95%	30.27% (Note: As Future Forward Party, Move Forward Party's de facto predecessor)	10.83%	2.43%	2.03%	0.92%		–	Did not exist	Did not exist	13.46%	3.42%	10.32%
24 March 2019	2019 election	–	23.34%	21.92%	17.34%	10.92%	10.33%	2.29%	2.16%	0.70%	–	–	–	1.68%	9.32%	1.46%

=== Preferred prime minister ===
View source data.

Fieldwork date(s)	Polling firm	Sample	Prayut	Sudarat	Paethongtarn	Srettha	Pita	Jurin		Sereepisuth	Korn	Anutin	Undecided	Others	Lead
9 – 12 May 2023	KPI	1,540	18.30	–	25.20	6.0	31.0	3.50		–	–	6.40	–	9.60	5.80
24 April – 3 May 2023	Nation	114,457	8.85	1.23	27.55	13.28	29.37	2.49		1.11	0.38	4.05	5.35	6.34	1.82
24 – 28 April 2023	NIDA	2,500	14.84	2.48	29.20	6.76	35.44	1.80		1.68	1.32	1.36	3.00	2.12	6.24
22 – 28 April 2023	Daily News X Matichon	78,583	6.52	1.04	19.59	15.54	49.17	—		0.84	1.74	0.64	1.18	3.74	29.58
8 – 14 April 2023	Daily News X Matichon	84,076	13.72	1.90	23.23	16.69	29.42	1.08		2.25	2.94	1.40	2.97	3.15	6.19
7–12 April 2023	Nation	39,687	8.13	1.67	33.81	7.45	16.87	2.59		1.42	1.09	2.70	22.58	1.69	11.23
3 – 7 April 2023	NIDA	2,000	13.60	4.15	35.70	6.05	20.25	2.20		3.45	1.95	2.55	6.10	4.00	15.45
Fieldwork date(s)	Polling firm	Sample	Prayut	Sudarat	Paethongtarn	Chonlanan	Pita	Jurin		Sereepisuth	Korn	Anutin	Undecided	Others	Lead
2 – 8 March 2023	NIDA	2,000	15.65	5.10	38.20	1.60	15.75	2.35		4.45	1.40	1.55	9.45	4.50	22.45
17 – 22 December 2022	NIDA	2,000	14.05	6.45	34.00	2.60	13.25	2.30		6.00	2.65	5.00	8.25	5.45	19.95
15 – 21 September 2022	NIDA	2,500	10.12	9.12	21.60	2.20	10.56	1.68		6.28	2.12	2.40	24.16	9.76	2.56
20 – 23 June 2022	NIDA	2,500	11.68	6.80	25.28	2.92	13.24	1.56		6.60	3.76	1.52	18.68	7.96	12.04
10 – 15 March 2022	NIDA	2,020	12.67	8.22	12.53	3.96	13.42	2.58		7.03	2.77	1.63	27.62	7.57	14.20
15 – 21 December 2021	NIDA	2,504	16.93	5.51	10.55	2.24	10.74	1.84		4.83	2.63	—	36.54	8.19	19.61
25 – 28 October 2021	Suan Dusit	1,186	21.27	19.35	—	—	28.67	—		—	—	—	—	30.71	7.40
Fieldwork date(s)	Polling firm	Sample	Prayut	Sudarat	Sompong		Pita	Jurin		Sereepisuth	Korn	Anutin	Undecided	Others	Lead
20 – 23 September 2021	NIDA	2,018	17.54	11.15	2.33		11.05	1.54		9.07	2.58	1.24	32.61	10.89	15.07
11 – 16 June 2021	NIDA	2,515	19.32	13.64	0.87		5.45	1.47		8.71	3.62	2.35	37.65	6.92	18.33
23 – 26 March 2021	NIDA	2,522	28.79	12.09	1.90		6.26	0.99		8.72	2.70	2.02	30.10	6.43	1.31
20 – 23 December 2020	NIDA	2,533	30.32	13.46	1.03		7.74	0.63		7.50	1.65	1.34	32.10	4.23	1.78
Fieldwork date(s)	Polling firm	Sample	Prayut	Sudarat	Sompong		Pita	Abhisit	Jurin	Sereepisuth	Korn	Anutin	Undecided	Others	Lead
18 – 23 September 2020	NIDA	2,527	18.64	10.57	1.07		5.70	—	—	3.92	1.54	0.67	54.13	3.76	35.49
22 – 24 June 2020	NIDA	2,517	25.47	8.07	0.99		3.93	0.95	0.83	4.57	1.67	0.44	44.06	9.02	18.59
Fieldwork date(s)	Polling firm	Sample	Prayut	Sudarat	Sompong		Thanathorn	Abhisit	Jurin	Sereepisuth	Korn	Anutin	Undecided	Others	Lead
18 – 20 December 2019	NIDA	2,511	23.74	11.95	0.40		31.42	0.67	2.47	3.90	0.04	1.08	17.32	7.01	7.68

=== Seat projection ===
Polling organisation/client	PTP	PPRP	MFP	DP	BJT	TLP	CTP	CPK	UTN	TST
Suan Dusit	246	22	106	28	45	2	9	2	25	4
SPU	180–200	20–40	110–130	20–40	40–60	2–4		3–5	45–65	4–6
NIDA	164–172	53–61	80–88	33–41	72–80	0–1	7–11	2–6	45–53	5–9
2019 election	136	116	81	53	51	10	10	3	0	0

== Results ==
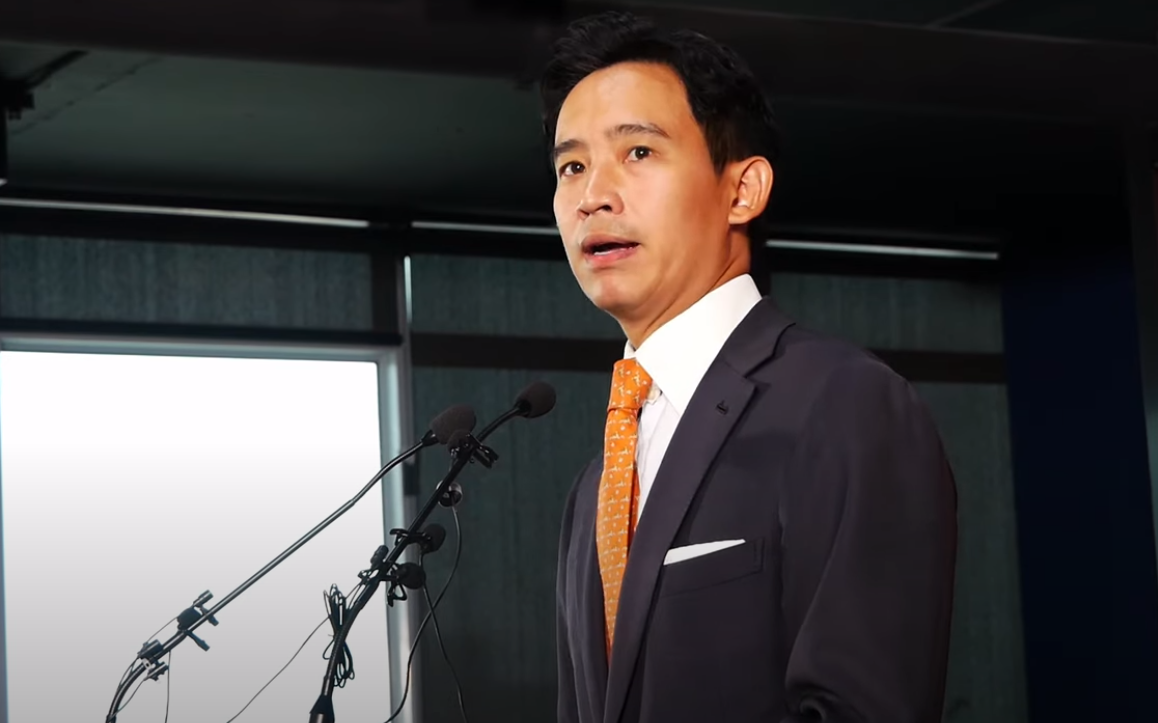
Pita Limjaroenrat of the Move Forward Party at a press conference declaring victory the day after the election.

Final results were announced on 25 May. The Election Commission endorsed all 500 MPs on 20 June; 67 parties won seats. While there were media reports that 71 MPs-elect in 37 constituencies received election fraud complaints, the commission decided to endorse all the MPs-elect to avoid rushing investigations. They have up to one year to investigate complaints after receiving them.

Party	Party-list			Constituency			Total seats	+/–
Party	Votes	%	Seats	Votes	%	Seats	Total seats	+/–
Move Forward Party	14,438,851	37.99	39	9,665,433	25.40	112	151	+70 (Note: Contested the 2019 general election as the Future Forward Party de facto.)
Pheu Thai Party	10,962,522	28.84	29	9,340,082	24.54	112	141	+5
United Thai Nation Party	4,766,408	12.54	13	3,607,575	9.48	23	36	New
Bhumjaithai Party	1,138,202	2.99	3	5,133,441	13.49	68	71	+20
Democrat Party	925,349	2.43	3	2,278,857	5.99	22	25	–28
Prachachat Party	602,645	1.59	2	334,051	0.88	7	9	+2
Palang Pracharath Party	537,625	1.41	1	4,186,441	11.00	39	40	–76
Thai Liberal Party	351,376	0.92	1	277,007	0.73	0	1	–9
Thai Sang Thai Party	340,178	0.90	1	872,893	2.29	5	6	New
New Democracy Party	273,428	0.72	1	13,583	0.04	0	1	0
New Party	249,731	0.66	1	1,365	0.00	0	1	New
Chart Pattana Kla Party	212,676	0.56	1	297,946	0.78	1	2	–1
Party of Thai Counties	201,411	0.53	1	1,202	0.00	0	1	New
Chartthaipattana Party	192,497	0.51	1	585,205	1.54	9	10	0
Fair Party	184,817	0.49	1	9,653	0.03	0	1	New
New Social Power Party	177,379	0.47	1	20,353	0.05	0	1	New
Thai Teachers for People Party	175,182	0.46	1	4,464	0.01	0	1	0
Power Party	156,493	0.41	0	2,807	0.01	0	0	New
Pheu Chart Thai Party	134,833	0.35	0	19,869	0.05	0	0	–1 (Note: Contested the 2019 general election as the Palang Thai Rak Thai Party.)
Nation Building Labour Party	130,147	0.34	0	1,200	0.00	0	0	New
Thai Pakdee Party	103,472	0.27	0	97,513	0.26	0	0	New
Thai Prompt Party	82,965	0.22	0	1,930	0.01	0	0	New
Thailand's Future Party	81,718	0.22	0	2,342	0.01	0	0	0 (Note: Contested the 2019 general election as the Thai Future Party.)
New Alternative Party	79,190	0.21	0	11,691	0.03	0	0	0
Thai Ruam Thai Party	72,988	0.19	0	996	0.00	0	0	New
Ruam Jai Thai Party	72,719	0.19	0	431	0.00	0	0	0
Pheu Thai Ruam Palang	67,692	0.18	0	94,345	0.25	2	2	New
For the Nation Party	59,571	0.16	0	43,946	0.12	0	0	–5
Thai Network Party	58,010	0.15	0	107	0.00	0	0	0
Thai Citizen Party	57,098	0.15	0	4,165	0.01	0	0	0
Change Party	53,706	0.14	0	5,089	0.01	0	0	New
Thai Chana Party	45,321	0.12	0	2,443	0.01	0	0	New
Power Thai Party	44,131	0.12	0	333	0.00	0	0	New
Thai Progress Party	35,094	0.09	0	1,556	0.00	0	0	New
Action Coalition Party	33,844	0.09	0	1,553	0.00	0	0	–5
New Palangdharma Party	33,770	0.09	0	1,593	0.00	0	0	–1
New Dimension Party	33,558	0.09	0	2,071	0.01	0	0	New
Thai Population Party	32,428	0.09	0	3,304	0.01	0	0	0
Thai Civilized Party	23,721	0.06	0	33,764	0.09	0	0	–1
Future Change Party	23,381	0.06	0	1,355	0.00	0	0	New
Green Party	22,047	0.06	0	1,597	0.00	0	0	0
Thai Morality Party	21,022	0.06	0	765	0.00	0	0	0
People Progressive Party	17,686	0.05	0	1,307	0.00	0	0	–1
Siamese Power Party	17,076	0.04	0	455	0.00	0	0	New
Thai One Party	13,605	0.04	0	2,528	0.01	0	0	New
Thai Forest Conservation Party	12,601	0.03	0	1,621	0.00	0	0	–2
Equality Party	11,816	0.03	0	1,577	0.00	0	0	New
Thailand Together Party	11,010	0.03	0	89,389	0.23	0	0	New
New Aspiration Party	10,891	0.03	0	1,195	0.00	0	0	0
Land of Dharma Party	10,875	0.03	0	707	0.00	0	0	0
The New Way Party	10,690	0.03	0	17,436	0.05	0	0	New
Thai Smart Party	10,463	0.03	0	12,295	0.03	0	0	New
Zen-Dai Party	10,410	0.03	0	8,440	0.02	0	0	–1 (Note: Contested the 2019 general election as the Thai Citizens Power Party.)
Cooperative Power Party	10,158	0.03	0	216	0.00	0	0	0
For the Thai Future Party	10,001	0.03	0	897	0.00	0	0	New
Palang Thai Rak Chart Party	9,174	0.02	0	132	0.00	0	0	0
Democratic Force Party	8,818	0.02	0	296	0.00	0	0	0
Klong Thai Party	7,959	0.02	0	50,948	0.13	0	0	0
Save the Nation Party	7,759	0.02	0	4,638	0.01	0	0	New
Commoners' Party	6,509	0.02	0	0	0.00	0	0	0
Rat Withi Party	6,172	0.02	0	4,317	0.01	0	0	New
Thai Social Democratic Party	5,860	0.02	0	934	0.00	0	0	0
Social Power Party	5,561	0.01	0	356	0.00	0	0	0
Thinkakhao Chaovilai Party	5,534	0.01	0	876	0.00	0	0	0
Thai People Power Party	5,022	0.01	0	20,940	0.06	0	0	–1
Chat Rung Rueang Party	4,433	0.01	0	436	0.00	0	0	New
Paradonraphab Party	3,455	0.01	0	637	0.00	0	0	0
Palang Burapha Party				889	0.00	0	0	0 (Note: Contested the 2019 general election as the Phalang Chon Party .)
Ruktam Party				232	0.00	0	0	New
Harmony People's Party				65	0.00	0	0	New
None of the above	482,303	1.27	–	866,885	2.28	–	–	–
Total	38,005,037	100.00	100	38,056,960	100.00	400	500	0
Valid votes	38,005,037	96.18		38,056,960	96.31			
Invalid/blank votes	1,509,836	3.82		1,457,899	3.69			
Total votes	39,514,873	100.00		39,514,859	100.00			
Registered voters/turnout	52,238,594	75.64		52,238,594	75.64			
Source: Election Commission

=== Results by province ===
Province	Total seats	Seats won											
Province	Total seats	MFP	PTP	BJP	PPRP	UTN	Dem	CTP	PCC	TST	CPK	PTRP	Others
Amnat Charoen	2			2									
Ang Thong	2			2									
Bangkok	33	32	1										
Bueng Kan	3		1	2									
Buriram	10			10									
Chachoengsao	4	1	2		1								
Chai Nat	2			1		1							
Chaiyaphum	7		3	2	2								
Chanthaburi	3	3											
Chiang Mai	10	7	2		1								
Chiang Rai	7	3	4										
Chonburi	10	7	1		1	1							
Chumphon	3					3							
Kalasin	6		4	1	1								
Kamphaeng Phet	4				4								
Kanchanaburi	5		4	1									
Khon Kaen	11	3	6	2									
Krabi	3			3									
Lampang	4	3	1										
Lamphun	2	1	1										
Loei	4		3	1									
Lopburi	5	1	2	2									
Mae Hong Son	2				1		1						
Maha Sarakham	6		5	1									
Mukdahan	2	1			1								
Nakhon Nayok	2		2										
Nakhon Pathom	6	2				1		3					
Nakhon Phanom	4		2	2									
Nakhon Ratchasima	16	3	12	1									
Nakhon Sawan	6	1	1	2		1					1		
Nakhon Si Thammarat	10			2	1	1	6						
Nan	3		3										
Narathiwat	5			1	2	1			1				
Nong Bua Lamphu	3		3										
Nong Khai	3		2		1								
Nonthaburi	8	8											
Pathum Thani	7	6	1										
Pattani	5				1		1		3				
Phang Nga	2			1	1								
Phatthalung	3					1	2						
Phayao	3				3								
Phetchabun	6				6								
Phetchaburi	3			1		2							
Phichit	3			3									
Phitsanulok	5	2	2			1							
Phra Nakhon Si Ayutthaya	5	2		3									
Phrae	3		3										
Phuket	3	3											
Prachinburi	3	1		2									
Prachuap Khiri Khan	3			1			2						
Ranong	1			1									
Ratchaburi	5				3	2							
Rayong	5	5											
Roi Et	8		5		1			1		1			
Sa Kaeo	3		1		2								
Sakon Nakhon	7		5		1		1						
Samut Prakan	8	8											
Samut Sakhon	3	3											
Samut Songkhram	1	1											
Saraburi	4	1	1	1	1								
Satun	2			2									
Sing Buri	1				1								
Sisaket	9		7	2									
Songkhla	9			1	1	1	6						
Sukhothai	4		4										
Suphan Buri	5							5					
Surat Thani	7			1		6							
Surin	8		3	5									
Tak	3	2			1								
Trang	4				1	1	2						
Trat	1	1											
Ubon Ratchathani	11		4	3			1			1		2	
Udon Thani	10	1	7							2			
Uthai Thani	2			2									
Uttaradit	3		3										
Yala	3								3				
Yasothon	3		1	1						1			
Partylist	100	39	29	3	2	13	2	1	2	1	1		7
Total	500	151	141	71	41	36	24	10	9	6	2	2	7
Source: Thai PBS

Party-list Votes
Province	Move Forward		Pheu Thai		United Thai Nation		Others		Total Votes
Province	Votes	%	Votes	%	Votes	%	Votes	%	Total Votes
Amnat Charoen	69,473	33.35	69,824	33.52	13,758	6.60	55,259	26.53	208,314
Ang Thong	66,558	38.79	58,947	34.35	16,423	9.57	29,662	17.29	171,590
Bangkok	1,600,689	49.85	600,267	18.70	630,997	19.65	378,816	11.80	3,210,769
Bueng Kan	74,541	33.52	106,129	47.72	4,568	2.05	37,168	16.71	222,406
Buriram	267,776	32.60	237,650	28.93	50,157	6.11	265,753	32.36	821,336
Chachoengsao	187,865	41.69	130,174	28.89	69,285	15.38	63,310	14.05	450,634
Chai Nat	69,691	36.25	53,664	27.92	24,078	12.53	44,803	23.31	192,236
Chaiyaphum	206,832	33.79	264,298	43.17	30,323	4.95	110,716	18.09	612,169
Chanthaburi	140,999	46.00	62,158	20.28	49,943	16.29	53,448	17.44	306,548
Chiang Mai	469,436	45.41	358,286	34.66	71,092	6.88	134,907	13.05	1,033,721
Chiang Rai	276,139	39.96	285,444	41.31	30,527	4.42	98,903	14.31	691,013
Chonburi	435,509	47.50	209,896	22.89	184,267	20.10	87,235	9.51	916,907
Chumphon	84,001	28.02	21,240	7.09	133,018	44.38	61,498	20.52	299,757
Kalasin	166,814	31.26	255,624	47.90	24,572	4.60	86,602	16.23	533,612
Kamphaeng Phet	144,037	38.63	102,643	27.53	44,551	11.95	81,662	21.90	372,893
Kanchanaburi	185,925	38.29	154,782	31.88	50,897	10.48	93,905	19.34	485,509
Khon Kaen	358,074	35.70	439,114	43.78	57,962	5.78	147,948	14.75	1,003,098
Krabi	84,577	30.39	23,358	8.39	68,335	24.56	101,996	36.65	278,266
Lampang	192,547	42.08	166,192	36.32	31,672	6.92	67,190	14.68	457,601
Lamphun	118,003	43.30	100,746	36.97	17,055	6.26	36,709	13.47	272,513
Loei	121,287	33.55	156,863	43.39	19,984	5.53	63,367	17.53	361,501
Lopburi	167,115	38.33	140,126	32.14	47,439	10.88	81,349	18.66	436,029
Mae Hong Son	56,351	40.52	31,879	22.93	8,992	6.47	41,832	30.08	139,054
Maha Sarakham	171,173	31.74	266,010	49.32	25,445	4.72	76,703	14.22	539,331
Mukdahan	73,868	37.08	83,864	42.10	6,942	3.48	34,536	17.34	199,210
Nakhon Nayok	60,875	37.33	48,283	29.61	20,907	12.82	32,997	20.24	163,062
Nakhon Pathom	273,736	46.51	144,471	24.55	80,386	13.66	89,951	15.28	588,544
Nakhon Phanom	105,605	27.74	181,282	47.62	9,178	2.41	84,597	22.22	380,662
Nakhon Ratchasima	556,001	36.32	569,935	37.23	129,878	8.48	274,949	17.96	1,530,763
Nakhon Sawan	210,202	35.79	189,868	32.33	70,172	11.95	117,084	19.94	587,326
Nakhon Si Thammarat	262,656	30.23	71,867	8.27	321,681	37.02	212,661	24.48	868,865
Nan	109,196	37.37	119,071	40.75	16,838	5.76	47,074	16.11	292,179
Narathiwat	85,742	20.79	14,741	3.57	33,882	8.22	278,031	67.42	412,396
Nong Bua Lamphu	88,577	33.93	117,405	44.97	8,611	3.30	46,468	17.80	261,061
Nong Khai	96,061	36.49	118,595	45.04	10,897	4.14	37,733	14.33	263,286
Nonthaburi	389,353	49.12	168,401	21.24	145,295	18.33	89,651	11.31	792,700
Pathum Thani	364,630	49.32	201,075	27.20	88,745	12.00	84,796	11.47	739,246
Pattani	85,273	23.05	10,781	2.91	30,503	8.24	243,437	65.79	369,994
Phang Nga	47,350	31.30	17,682	11.69	46,122	30.49	40,107	26.52	151,261
Phatthalung	96,183	28.82	26,930	8.07	98,407	29.48	112,263	33.63	333,783
Phayao	108,078	37.36	115,484	39.92	14,110	4.88	51,651	17.85	289,323
Phetchabun	193,197	36.43	172,154	32.47	51,147	9.65	113,776	21.46	530,274
Phetchaburi	119,899	38.74	50,675	16.37	69,568	22.48	69,343	22.41	309,485
Phichit	95,030	31.88	95,820	32.15	34,626	11.62	72,590	24.35	298,066
Phitsanulok	184,899	38.09	150,677	31.04	66,015	13.60	83,867	17.28	485,458
Phra Nakhon Si Ayutthaya	234,289	45.05	153,186	29.45	54,367	10.45	78,263	15.05	520,105
Phrae	95,251	34.57	120,604	43.77	28,747	10.43	30,913	11.22	275,515
Phuket	92,565	41.27	16,573	7.39	71,192	31.74	43,980	19.61	224,310
Prachinburi	137,539	46.32	73,757	24.84	32,863	11.07	52,761	17.77	296,920
Prachuap Khiri Khan	119,968	38.91	52,042	16.88	55,530	18.01	80,772	26.20	308,312
Ranong	30,550	30.59	7,199	7.21	39,075	39.13	23,043	23.07	99,867
Ratchaburi	233,608	44.12	102,757	19.41	90,598	17.11	102,575	19.37	529,538
Rayong	230,729	53.24	75,748	17.48	54,654	12.61	72,263	16.67	433,394
Roi Et	215,728	30.49	366,956	51.86	24,011	3.39	100,919	14.26	707,614
Sa Kaeo	118,421	39.13	93,523	30.90	25,791	8.52	64,897	21.44	302,632
Sakon Nakhon	202,237	33.97	277,632	46.63	22,804	3.83	92,697	15.57	595,370
Samut Prakan	447,751	54.30	166,481	20.19	104,983	12.73	105,422	12.78	824,637
Samut Sakhon	172,160	51.50	67,553	20.21	46,156	13.81	48,398	14.48	334,267
Samut Songkhram	54,294	47.69	18,979	16.67	22,455	19.72	18,115	15.91	113,843
Saraburi	178,371	45.00	107,228	27.05	48,293	12.18	62,445	15.76	396,337
Satun	62,690	34.45	28,683	15.76	38,565	21.19	52,056	28.60	181,994
Sing Buri	48,951	39.89	36,956	30.11	14,068	11.46	22,745	18.53	122,720
Sisaket	224,197	28.63	390,552	49.88	28,908	3.69	139,320	17.79	782,977
Songkhla	262,517	31.01	48,525	5.73	244,723	28.91	290,856	34.35	846,621
Sukhothai	115,750	34.71	125,832	37.74	35,696	10.71	56,169	16.84	333,447
Suphan Buri	182,211	36.41	119,703	23.92	28,075	5.61	170,472	34.06	500,461
Surat Thani	207,435	34.94	60,521	10.19	197,364	33.24	128,402	21.63	593,722
Surin	233,681	32.63	301,813	42.15	44,159	6.17	136,453	19.05	716,106
Tak	114,026	40.45	65,581	23.26	27,674	9.82	74,613	26.47	281,894
Trang	123,052	32.43	33,930	8.94	114,163	30.09	108,312	28.54	379,457
Trat	54,755	45.22	22,416	18.51	20,181	16.67	23,730	19.60	121,082
Ubon Ratchathani	320,831	31.53	411,239	40.41	64,628	6.35	220,958	21.71	1,017,656
Udon Thani	295,097	36.61	353,147	43.82	37,059	4.60	120,668	14.97	805,971
Uthai Thani	64,188	36.69	39,189	22.40	20,914	11.95	50,655	28.95	174,946
Uttaradit	89,819	34.87	103,237	40.08	29,324	11.38	35,208	13.67	257,588
Yala	66,386	23.98	10,828	3.91	28,962	10.46	170,653	61.65	276,829
Yasothon	87,981	29.07	145,677	48.14	11,176	3.69	57,778	19.09	302,612

=== Analysis ===
Party-list vote

Move Forward

Pheu Thai

United Thai Nation

1. Move Forward (38.0%)
2. Pheu Thai (28.9%)
3. United Thai Nation (12.6%)
4. Bhumjaithai (3.00%)
5. Democrat (2.44%)
6. Prachachart (1.59%)
7. Palang Pracharat (1.42%)
8. Other (12.1%)
1. Move Forward (30.2%)
2. Pheu Thai (28.2%)
3. Bhumjaithai (14.2%)
4. Palang Pracharat (8.00%)
5. United Thai Nation (7.20%)
6. Democrat (5.00%)
7. Chartthaipattana (2.00%)
8. Prachachart (2.00%)
9. Other (3.20%)

Total seats of pro/anti-junta parties

The Move Forward Party won the most seats with 151, including sweeping all but one of Bangkok's seats, outperforming another opposition party, Pheu Thai, which was considered the frontrunner. Analysts saw this as a significant political shift, and Move Forward supporters called the results a "wind of change" and the "dawn of a new era". This also broke Pheu Thai's run of being the party with the most MPs since 2001 (including its predecessors, the People's Power Party and Thai Rak Thai Party).

The two main parties connected to the former military junta, the Palang Pracharath Party and its split-off United Thai Nation Party lost half their seats compared to Palang Pracharath's result in 2019. The Democrat Party, a junior coalition partner, also lost over half its seats. Bhumjai Thai was the only coalition party which gained seats in this election.

Analysts were surprised at Move Forward's performance. It was attributed to a desire for change, dissatisfaction of the Prayuth premiership, and a reluctance to vote for the formerly dominant Pheu Thai. Move Forward's distinctive commitment to reforming the country's lèse-majesté law could also have been an issue that influenced voters. Napon Jatusripitak, a Thai political scientist at the ISEAS–Yusof Ishak Institute, opined that this election indexed a readiness in the country to transcend past political divides and to instead focus on structural reforms "concerning the role of traditional power centers in Thailand".

With a two-ballot system reinstated in 2021, vote-splitting led to 186 constituencies having different party-vote winners and constituency winners. The Move Forward Party, Pheu Thai, and United Thai Nation all had higher party votes than constituency votes, and were the only party vote winner in all the provinces (excluding Pattani, Yala and Narathiwat where Prachachart won the party vote). Various baan yai parties ("Big House", wealthy and influential political families in various provinces) and junta support parties managed to win local seats even while those same local seats gave their party vote to Move Forward. The Move Forward Party won the party vote in 34 Bhumjaithai, 23 Palang Pracharath, and 13 United Thai Nation seats, along with entrenched dynasties retaining local seats in Suphanburi, Buriram, Petchabun, Kamphaeeng Phet, and Uthai Thani. Considering that some dynasties such as the Pitutecha Clan (Democrat Party) in Rayong, along with dynasties in Samut Prakan and Chon Buri lost all their seats, Mathis Lohatepanont and Napon Jatusripitak believe this vote splitting is not a sign of strength for the baan yai, but a struggle for survival against the popularity of the Move Forward Party.

== Government formation ==
=== Move Forward–led coalition ===
The Move Forward party leader Pita Limjaroenrat announced a six-party alliance with four former opposition parties—Pheu Thai, Thai Sang Thai, Prachachat and the Thai Liberal Party—and one new party, the Fair Party. The coalition would include 310 MPs, more than enough for a majority government in the House of Representatives. It later grew to eight parties (with Pheu Thai Ruam Palang and the New Social Power Party joining), accounting to 313 MPs. On 22 May, the eight parties signed a historic memorandum of understanding listing 23 policies they agreed on, including restoration of democracy, enacting marriage equality law, and reformation of the security and justice system. However, the issue of lèse-majesté was left out.

Pita needed 376 votes from the complete National Assembly to be voted prime minister. Due to the foreseeable gridlock that no senators would vote for a Pita premiership, some started to see Bhumjai Thai, which finished third in the election, a "kingmaker" and allying itself with Move Forward–led coalition, but during campaigning its leader Anutin had ruled out an alliance with parties that seek to reform the lèse-majesté law. Some senators said that they would not automatically vote for Pita, while stating that they had the country's best interests at heart; however, 15 senators were reportedly gearing to back his bid to be prime minister. Civil society also began pressuring senators to vote for Pita, and, on 23 May, organized a rally near the parliament.

Apart from the full parliament prime minister vote, there was much anxiety of a possible dissolution of the Move Forward party or court rulings against it — the same fate as its predecessor, the Future Forward party. Pita was also accused of owning shares in ITV, a de-listed television broadcaster since 2008, which could disqualify him from being an MP. After the election, there was a conflict between Move Forward and Pheu Thai over the House speaker seat. Some self-proclaimed Pheu Thai supporters also urged their party to leave the Move Forward–led coalition. Rumors that Pheu Thai could join the old coalition parties from before the election persisted. The Royal Thai Armed Forces pledged to respect the results of the general election and not launch a coup.

On 3 July, the new parliament was opened by King Rama X, and the coalition agreed to Wan Muhamad Noor Matha of the Prachachat Party to be nominated as speaker, paving the way for government formation. Wan previously served as Speaker from 1996 to 2000.

On 13 July, the government formation was blocked, as Pita's coalition failed to gain the requisite 375 votes in parliament. While 324 members of parliament voted in favor, 182 voted against and 199 abstained. Most of the junta-appointed senators refused to endorse Pita for Prime Minister, leading to protest and criticism.

Prime Minister Vote for Pita Limjaroenrat 2023, Green for Yes and Red for No

1st prime ministership parliamentary vote
Candidate		Pita Limjaroenrat
Ballot	13 July 2023	
Choice	Votes	%
Yes	324	43.26
Move Forward	151	20.16
Pheu Thai	141	18.83
Senators	13	1.74
Prachachat	8	1.07
Thai Sang Thai	6	0.80
Pheu Thai Ruam Palang	2	0.27
Fair Party	1	0.13
Social Power	1	0.13
Thai Liberal	1	0.13
No	182	24.30
Bhumjaithai	70	9.35
Palang Pracharath	40	5.34
United Thai Nation	36	4.81
Senators	34	4.54
New Democracy	1	0.13
Thai Counties	1	0.13
Abstentions	198	26.57
Senators	159	21.23
Democrat	25	3.34
Chart Thai Pattana	10	1.34
Chart Pattana Kla	2	0.27
New Party	1	0.13
Teachers for People	1	0.13
Speaker	1	0.13
Absentees	44	5.87
Senators	43	5.74
Bhumjaithai	1	0.13
Total votes	749	100.00
Required majority	375	50.07
Result: As no one got a majority of the votes, a prime minister was not elected.

On 19 July, the National Assembly convened for a second time to elect a new prime minister. That day, the Constitutional Court unanimously voted to accept a case against Pita regarding his inherited shares of the defunct iTV. They also voted 7–2 to suspend him from MP duty until it reached a ruling, though this did not preclude him from being nominated for prime minister. In the subsequent debate, the National Assembly voted against considering him for another round of voting for prime minister. His renomination was argued to have been against a parliamentary rule prohibiting a repeat motion. In the voting for his renomination, 312 voters supported, 394 rejected—most of which were senators—eight abstained and one did not vote. The decision to prohibit renominations was controversial, with critics arguing that it was unconstitutional. Many complaints were filed to the Office of the Ombudsman, which on 24 July agreed to forward the case to the Constitutional Court. This led to further prime ministerial voting being postponed by Parliament; the next vote had originally been scheduled for 27 July.

=== Pheu Thai–led coalition ===
After Move Forward's attempts were blocked, the opportunity to lead the government formation was passed on to Pheu Thai, who were expected to nominate Srettha Thavisin to be prime minister. As part of Pheu Thai's attempts to form a government, talks were held with many of the conservative and/or pro-junta parties, who insisted that they would not support any coalition including Move Forward due to its policy on amending the lèse-majesté laws. This, coupled with an announcement that exiled former prime minister Thaksin Shinawatra would return to Thailand, fuelled speculations of a deal with outgoing coalition parties that would see Pheu Thai abandoning the coalition with Move Forward.

On 2 August, Pheu Thai announced that it was leaving the eight-party coalition and would attempt to form a new coalition that excludes Move Forward, with Srettha as the candidate for prime minister. On 3 August, the Constitutional Court announced that its decision on Pita's renomination would be made on 16 August. In response, the PM vote, scheduled for 4 August, was again postponed to 22 August.

On 7 August, Pheu Thai and Bhumjaithai announced an alliance that would try to form a new coalition government. They were joined by six parties—Prachachart, Pheu Thai Ruam Palang, Chart Pattana Kla, Thai Liberal, New Social Power, and the Party of Thai Counties—on 9 August, followed by Chart Thai Pattana on 10 August, bringing their total to 238 MPs, which is less than the initial opposition coalition but which was seen as more favorable to the conservative military establishment in the Senate.

On 16 August, the Constitutional Court dismissed the petitions on Pita's renomination, stating that the plaintiff was not the directly affected party, clearing the way for a new round of prime ministerial voting. An eleven-party coalition was announced on 21 August, including the aforementioned parties along with the military-associated parties United Thai Nation and Palang Pracharath for a total of 314 MPs. Pheu Thai's alliance with the military parties was controversial among many voters, including some of its own supporters, as its leaders had promised not to join with them before the election.

A poll published by NIDA the day prior showed that around 64% of those surveyed opposed Pheu Thai allying with military-backed parties. On 22 August at 9 am Bangkok time, Thaksin returned to Thailand and landed at Don Mueang International Airport, following 15 years of self-imposed exile, and was promptly sent to court and then prison to begin serving an eight-year sentence for his outstanding corruption convictions. Hours later, he was transferred to the Police General Hospital, which prompted accusations of special treatment. On 31 August, outgoing Justice Minister Wissanu Krea-ngam confirmed that Thaksin had requested a royal pardon, and on 1 September the Royal Gazette announced the King had commuted his sentence to one year.

On the evening of 22 August, the day of Thaksin's arrival, Srettha Thavisin was elected with 482 votes for, 165 votes against, with 81 abstentions. On 23 August, the King formally endorsed Srettha to become the 30th Prime Minister of Thailand. The endorsement document was posted on the Royal Gazette's website. At the event, Srettha also gave his first speech as prime minister. His cabinet was sworn in on 5 September.

The protracted government formation led to a further issue: Move Forward had now become the largest opposition party, but one of its MPs, Padipat Suntiphada, had already been elected deputy house speaker by the eight-party coalition. Constitutionally, the opposition leader could not be from the same party as a speaker or deputy speaker. As a result, Move Forward strategically expelled Padipat so that the leadership of the opposition could be taken by its new leader Chaithawat Tulathon. Government parties criticized the expulsion as an undignified political gambit that would in practice keep both positions in Move Forward's control, while Padipat insisted he would not act as Move Forward's nominee.

2nd prime ministership parliamentary vote
Candidate		Srettha Thavisin
Ballot	22 August 2023	
Choice	Votes	%
Yes	482	64.52
Senators	152	20.35
Pheu Thai	141	18.88
Bhumjaithai	71	9.50
Palang Pracharath	39	5.34
United Thai Nation	36	5.22
Democrat	16	2.14
Chart Thai Pattana	10	1.34
Prachachat	8	1.07
Chart Pattana Kla	2	0.27
Pheu Thai Ruam Palang	2	0.27
Thai Liberal	1	0.13
New Party	1	0.13
New Democracy	1	0.13
Thai Counties	1	0.13
Social Power	1	0.13
Teachers for People	1	0.13
No	165	22.09
Move Forward	149	19.95
Senators	13	1.74
Democrat	2	0.27
Fair Party	1	0.13
Abstentions	81	10.84
Senators	68	9.10
Thai Sang Thai	6	0.80
Democrat	6	0.80
Speaker	1	0.13
Absentees	19	2.54
Senators	16	2.14
Pheu Thai	1	0.13
Palang Pracharath	1	0.13
Democrat	1	0.13
Total votes	747	100.00
Required majority	374	50.07
Result: Srettha Thavisin is elected the 30th prime minister.
