= Rewat Sirinukul =

Thai politician (1936–2021)

- เรวัต สิรินุกุล
- Born: 25 February 1936
- Died: 26 September 2021 (aged 85)
- Occupation: politician
- Years active: 1983–2011
- Known for: member, House of Representatives of Thailand
- Political party: Thai Liberal Party

Rewat Sirinukul (Thai: เรวัต สิรินุกุล) (25 February 1936 – 26 September 2021) was a Thai politician.

From 1983 to 2011, he served as a member of the House of Representatives of Thailand representing the Thai Liberal Party.

Sirinukul died from COVID-19 in 2021, aged 85.
