= Kowit Wattana =

Thai politician and police commissioner (1947–2025)

Kowit Wattana TChW
- โกวิท วัฒนะ
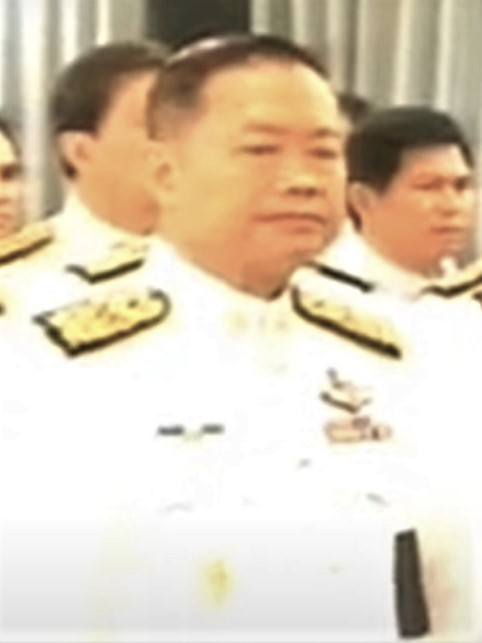

Deputy Prime Minister of Thailand
- In office 9 August 2011 – 18 January 2012
- Prime Minister: Yingluck Shinawatra
- In office 2 August 2008 – 9 September 2008
- Prime Minister: Samak Sundaravej

Minister of Interior
- In office 2 August 2008 – 2 December 2008
- Prime Minister: Samak Sundaravej; Somchai Wongsawat
- Preceded by: Chalerm Yubamrung
- Succeeded by: Chaovarat Chanweerakul

Commissioner-General of the Royal Thai Police
- In office 1 October 2004 – 2 December 2007
- Preceded by: San Sarutanon
- Succeeded by: Seripisut Temiyavet

Personal details
- Born: 11 March 1947 Phak Hai, Phra Nakhon Si Ayutthaya Province, Thailand
- Died: 15 December 2025 (aged 79) Bangkok, Thailand
- Party: Pheu Thai Party
- Education: Royal Thai Police Cadet Academy
- Profession: Police officer

Kowit Wattana (Thai: โกวิท วัฒนะ, RTGS: Kowit Watthana; 11 March 1947 – 15 December 2025) was a Thai police general and politician. From 2004 to 2007, he was the Commissioner-General of the Royal Thai Police. In 2008, he was Minister of the Interior, and from 2011 to 2012 Deputy Prime Minister under Yingluck Shinawatra. Kowit was a member of the ruling Pheu Thai Party.

== Early life and police service ==
Kowit Wattana's father was a teacher and prefect of Phak Hai District. Kowit graduated from the Armed Forces Academies Preparatory School (class 6) and the Royal Thai Police Cadet Academy (class 22). He started his career in public service as an officer of the Border Patrol Police. He served in this paramilitary unit for 27 years.

From 1970 to 1975, he was on the Border Patrol Police special company fighting the communist insurgency in Thailand. Later he commanded the troops responsible for a 120 kilometres (75 mi) section of the Thai-Burmese border. Later he was leader of the Border Patrol Police in the whole northern sector. In this position his main challenges were fighting drug-related crime, shutting down several heroin factories in Chiang Mai, Chiang Rai, Phayao and Mae Hong Son, and counter-insurgency. In 1994, he was promoted to national commander of the Border Patrol.

In 2004, he was named Commissioner-General of the Royal Thai Police.

== Political career ==
Following the 2006 coup d'état, Kowit was named third deputy chief of the Council for Democratic Reform under Constitutional Monarchy. On 22 September, the council gave Police General Wattana absolute power over all police matters. He was also made Chair of a new National Police Commission. The commission will be assigned to amend the 2004 National Police Bill over the next year; the bill had been originally been approved by the elected parliament. Under the pre-coup legal framework, the premier had been responsible for chairing the commission. So far, two members of the new police commission have been announced, Pol Gen Phatcharawat Wongsuwan and Pol Gen Issaraphan Sanitwong. He was replaced by Seripisut Temiyavet in 2007. There was speculation about the motivation behind the replacement, as Kowit had earlier arrested several military personnel for alleged involvement in the 2006 Bangkok New Year's Eve bombings.

On 2 August 2008, Kowit Wattana was appointed Deputy Prime Minister and Minister of Interior, replacing Chalerm Yubamrung for the latter position. On 24 September 2008, Kowit was appointed Minister of Interior in Somchai Wongsawat's cabinet, serving until the government broke apart on 2 December 2008.

He was an executive member of the Pheu Thai Party, successor of the dissolved and banned People's Power Party. In September 2010, he was expected to replace Yongyuth Wichaidit as the party's chairman, but he demurred and asked Yongyuth to carry on.

On 9 August 2011, Kowit was appointed Deputy Prime Minister in Yingluck Shinawatra's cabinet. He resigned from the office due to a major reshuffle of the Yingluck cabinet on 18 January 2012.

== Death ==
Wattana died at the Police General Hospital in Bangkok, on 15 December 2025, at the age of 78.

Political offices
Preceded by Sanan Kachornprasart; Trairong Suwankiri; Suthep Thaugsuban	Deputy Prime Minister of Thailand; 2011–2012 with Yongyuth Wichaidit (2011–2012); Chalerm Yubamrung (2011–2012); Kittiratt Na-Ranong (2011–2012); Chumpol Silpa-archa (2011–2012)	Succeeded by Yuthasak Sasiprapha
Preceded by Chalerm Yubamrung	Minister of Interior; 2008	Succeeded by Chavarat Charnvirakul
Police appointments
Preceded by Sunthorn Saikwan	Commissioner-General of the Royal Thai Police; 2004–2007	Succeeded by Sereepisuth Temeeyaves
