= Network of Social Democracy in Asia =

Political Organization

Socdem Asia
- Leader: Marie Chris Cabreros
- Founded: 2009; 17 years ago
- Headquarters: Diliman, Quezon City, Philippines
- Ideology: Social democracy
- Political position: Centre-left
- International affiliation: Progressive Alliance
- Colors: Red

The Network of Social Democracy in Asia, more commonly known as Socdem Asia, is a regional grouping of social democratic organizations in Asia. Socdem Asia is an associate network of the Progressive Alliance.

== Political parties ==
=== Full members ===
The network is composed of political parties from 13 countries.

Country	Name	Abbr	Government
Australia	Australian Labor Party	ALP	In government
New Zealand	New Zealand Labour Party		In opposition
Indonesia	NasDem Party		Confidence and supply
Indonesia	Indonesian Democratic Party of Struggle	PDI-P	Confidence and supply
South Korea	Justice Party	JP	Extra-parliamentary opposition
Malaysia	Democratic Action Party	DAP	In government
Mongolia	Mongolian People's Party	MPP	In government
Myanmar	Democratic Party for a New Society	DPNS	—N/a
Myanmar	Shan Nationalities League for Democracy	SNLD	—N/a
Nepal	Nepali Congress	NC	In opposition
Nepal	People's Socialist Party Nepal		In opposition
Philippines	Akbayan Citizens' Action Party		In opposition
Thailand	People's Party	PPLE	In opposition
Thailand	Commoners' Party		—N/a
Timor-Leste	Revolutionary Front for an Independent East Timor	Fretilin	In opposition

=== Observer parties ===
There are three observer parties:

Country	Name	Abbr	Government
India	Dravidian Progressive Federation	DMK	In opposition
India	National People's Party	RJD	In opposition
India	Indian National Congress	INC	In opposition

== See also ==
- Post-neoliberalism
- Socialist International
- Category: Social Democracy in Asia
