= Commoners' Party (Thailand) =

Commoners' Party พรรคสามัญชน
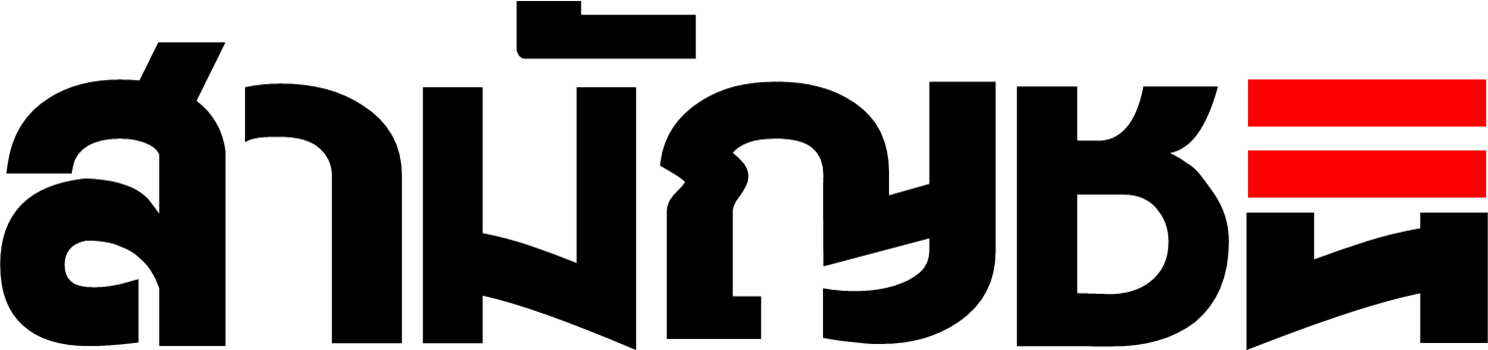
- Leader: Kittichai Ngamchaipisit
- Founded: 2 March 2018; 8 years ago
- Dissolved: 2 October 2024
- Headquarters: Bangkok, Thailand
- Ideology: Progressivism; Social democracy Liberal democracy
- Political position: Centre-left
- Regional affiliation: Network of Social Democracy in Asia
- International affiliation: Progressive Alliance (guest since 2018)
- Colours: Black, red

The Commoners' Party (Thai: พรรคสามัญชน) was a political party in Thailand founded on 2 March 2018 by Kittichai Ngamchaipisit, a former university student and electrician, and Por Gun Tee, a former youth activist. According to Tee, the party’s main goal was to help low-income citizens gain parliamentary representation. Instead of trying to represent the poor people and their voices, the party aimed to let them speak for themselves, which is why it was called the Commoners' Party. The party's symbol was an equal sign (=).

The commoner movement was founded by activists in 2012 to protest the government's not caring enough about the poor people of Thailand.

The ideology of the Commoners' Party was liberal democracy. It opposed the government of Prime Minister Prayut Chan-o-cha. Apart from including poor people and the underprivileged in parliament, the party also agitated for LGBT rights, women's rights, educational reform in the deep south, rights to local natural resources, better universal healthcare, labor rights for both Thai and migrant workers, decentralization and local self-determination. The party supported the repeal of section 112 of the Thai Criminal Code, which codifies lèse-majesté in Thailand.

The party was dissolved on 2 October 2024, as its membership had decreased below the requirement for political parties.
