= Warong Dechgitvigrom =

Thai politician (born 1961)

- วรงค์ เดชกิจวิกรม
- Warong in 2020

Member of the House of Representatives
- Incumbent
- Assumed office 8 February 2026
- Constituency: Party-list

Member of the House of Representatives for Phitsanulok province
- In office 6 February 2005 – 9 December 2013
- Preceded by: Phitak Santiwongdecha
- Succeeded by: Padipat Santipada

Leader of the Thai Pakdee Party
- Incumbent
- Assumed office 16 November 2025
- Preceded by: Kanyada Na Nongkhai
- In office 24 August 2021 – 5 August 2023
- Preceded by: Founding of the party
- Succeeded by: Isaraporn Narinn

Personal details
- Born: 1 May 1961 (age 65) Mueang Sukhothai, Sukhothai, Thailand
- Party: Thai Rak Thai (2003–2004); Democrat (2004–2019); Action Coalition (2019–2020); Thai Pakdee (2021–present)
- Spouse: Suwaree Dechgitvigrom

Warong Dechgitvigrom (Thai: วรงค์ เดชกิจวิกรม; born 1 May 1961) is a Thai politician and former physician. He currently serves as the leader of the Thai Pakdee Party and as a member of the House of Representatives elected through the party-list system. He was formerly a member of the House of Representatives for Phitsanulok Province under the Democrat Party and the chief executive officer of the Action Coalition Party. He is also a leading figure in the Thai Pakdee Movement.

He graduated with a bachelor's degree from faculty of medicine, Chiangmai University, Thailand.

== Career ==
Warong is a prominent critic of the Thai government’s rice-pledging scheme, launched in 2011 under the premiership of Prime Minister Yingluck Shinawatra.

In November 2018, he ran for the position of leader of the Democrat Party against Abhisit Vejjajiva and Alongkorn Ponlaboot. He came in second place, losing to Abhisit, and resigned from the party shortly afterward.

In January 2025, he aligned with former Red Shirt leader Jatuporn Prompan in protesting the influence of former prime minister Thaksin Shinawatra over the administration of his daughter, then–prime minister Paetongtarn Shinawatra.

In March 2025, he called on the government to consider implementing price controls on rice to ensure that farmers received fair prices.

== Royal decorations ==
- 2011 – Knight Grand Cordon (Special Class) of The Most Noble Order of the Crown of Thailand
- 2008 – Knight Grand Cross (First Class) of The Most Exalted Order of the White Elephant
