= Sereepisuth Temeeyaves =

Thai politician and police officer (born 1948)

Sereepisuth Temeeyaves MPCh MVM RMK
- เสรีพิศุทธ์ เตมียเวส
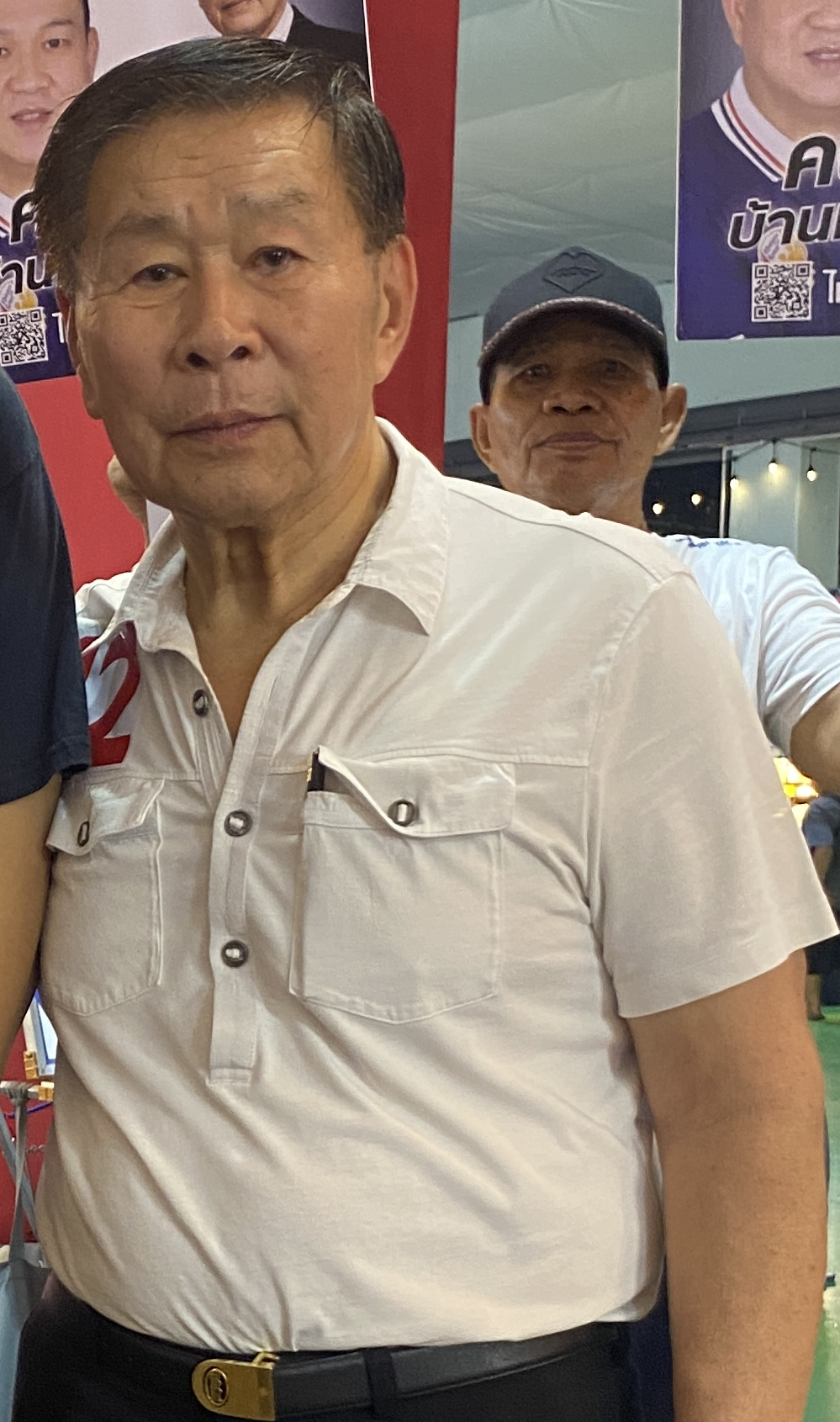
- Sereepisuth Temeeyaves in 2026

Member of the House of Representatives
- In office 24 March 2019 – 1 September 2023
- Constituency: Party-list

Leader of the Thai Liberal Party
- Incumbent
- Assumed office 24 October 2018
- Preceded by: Paiboon Phuengthonglor

Commissioner-General of the Royal Thai Police
- In office 1 October 2007 – 8 April 2008
- Preceded by: Kowit Wattana
- Succeeded by: Patcharawat Wongsuwan

Personal details
- Born: Seri Temeeyaves; 3 September 1948 (age 78) Thonburi, Thailand
- Party: Thai Liberal
- Spouse: Phatsaweesiri Thepchatri
- Children: 3
- Education: Royal Thai Police Cadet Academy
- Profession: Police officer; politician

Sereepisuth Temeeyaves (Thai: เสรีพิศุทธ์ เตมียเวส; RTGS: Seriphisut Temiyawet, originally: Seri Temeeyaves; Thai: เสรี เตมียเวส; born 3 September 1948) is the leader of Thai Liberal Party, a Party List member of the 25th and 26th House of Representatives of Thailand, and the chairman the 25th National Assembly's Committee on Corruption Prevention and Suppression.

Sereepisuth is a former Commissioner of the Royal Thai Police between February 2007 and April 2008 by a military junta, replacing Kowit Wattana as the fifth Commissioner. Sereepisuth was removed from office in April 2008 by then prime minister Samak Sundaravej under charges of corruption. The junta also appointed him Director of the Airports of Thailand, along with Chairman General Saprang Kalayanamitr.

Sereepisuth gained his reputation from targeting mafia leaders like "Kamnan Poh" (Somchai Khunpluem) and "Por Pratunam" (Phaijit Thammarojphinij). In his earlier days, he fought against the Communist Party of Thailand in the northeastern region of Thailand, becoming a recipient of the Order of Rama Medal for Gallantry in Action, which was commonly given to soldiers and rarely a police. and gained the moniker "Hero of Na Kae".

Personally, he is married to Phatsaweesiri Thepchatri Temeeyaves (Thai: พัสวีศิริ เทพชาตรี เตมียาเวส) and has three children.

== Early life ==
He was born and raised in historic Thonburi (in an area currently assigned to Nonthaburi) to a Teochew background family, his surname was given by King Vajiravudh on 18 March 1914, list 2081.

Seri graduated from the 8th class of the Armed Forces Academies Preparatory School and graduated in the 24th class of the Royal Thai Police Cadet Academy. He took part in anti-communist operations in the Northeast, where he became close friends with Manoonkrit Roopkachorn. Because of this association, he was purged from the police after the NPKC Coup of 23 February 1992. He was later rehabilitated and allowed back into the police force.

As assistant director of the 2nd Region Police, Seri was in charge of the 1994 arrest of "Kamnan Poh" in the Khao Mai Kaew land corruption case. In 2003, a court found the influential Kamnan Poh guilty and sentenced him to jail.

Seri rose through the ranks of to become Inspector-General. Under the government of Thaksin Shinawatra, he was assigned to several high-profile corruption cases, including the longan subsidy scandal, the Bobae mafia case, and the Government Public Warehouse rice screening case. Sereepisuth came into conflict with Army officer Maj General Khattiya Sawasdipol of the Internal Security Operations Command while investigating the "Por Pratunam" gambling den of Phaijit Thammarojphinij. Sereepisuth filed a libel lawsuit against Khattiya, although Khattiya was acquitted in November 2006. After Sereepisuth was promoted to Police Commissioner General, Khattiya filed a 600 million baht defamation suit against him.

== Police Commissioner General ==
On 5 February 2007, Sereepisuth was appointed Police Commissioner General by the military junta that had overthrown the government of Thaksin Shinawatra on 19 September 2006. He replaced Kowit Wattana, who had served as Police Commissioner General under the Thaksin government. There was great speculation about the motivation behind the replacement, as Kowit had earlier arrested several military personnel for alleged involvement in the 2006 Bangkok New Year's Eve bombings.

=== Purging of the police force ===
In his first staff reshuffle, Sereepisuth transferred Metropolitan Police Commissioner Viroj Chantarangsi to the provinces in the Lower North. Those close to former Commissioner Kowit Wattana and deposed Premier Thaksin Shinawatra were transferred to inactive posts. At the same time, he promoted police officers with close connections to him to powerful posts. Viroj, a classmate of Kowit, was replaced by Adisorn Nonsi, a former close aid of Sereepisuth. Pol Lt-Gen Thawornsak Thepchatree, an elder brother of Sereepisuthh's wife, was appointed adviser to the National Police Office. Pol Lt-Gen Jettanakorn Napeetaphat, who is married to the sister of Prime Minister Surayud's wife, replacing Pol Lt-Gen Adul Sangsingkeo in dealing with the South Thailand insurgency as Region 9 Commissioner.

=== Criticism of Prem Tinsulanonda ===
Sereepisuth came under fire for his role in a petition to remove General Prem Tinsulanonda from his leadership of King Bhumibol Adulyadej's Privy Council. Police Special Branch Commander Lt-General Theeradech Rodpho-thong refused to file charges of lèse majesté against activists who launched a petition, claiming that the law only applied to members of the royal family. Two days later, he was demoted by Sereepisuth.

=== Relationship with the junta ===
Sereepisuth often sided with the Council for National Security (CNS) rather than his own staff. After numerous bombs were exploded simultaneously on 27 May 2007 in Hat Yai, the police Special Branch claimed it was confident that the explosions were linked to the southern insurgency. The Special branch cited intelligence reports from two days before the blasts warning that two youngsters from the southern provinces were sneaking explosive devices into Songkhla. However, the CNS spokesperson claimed that there was reason to believe that the bombs were set off by people who were losing political power, a common euphemism for the deposed government of Thaksin Shinawatra. Sereepisuth agreed with the CNS.

Junta critic Maj Gen Khattiya Sawasdipol was convicted of defaming and sentenced to four months in jail after he criticised Sereepisuth's crackdown on gambling dens.

=== Friends of Seri Foundation controversy ===
Sereepisuth is the Chairman of the Friends of Seri Foundation and involved in controversial loans made to businessman and junta-associate Thanaboon Jiranuwat. Thanaboon's construction business was losing money, and he received an 18% interest-rate loan from Sereepisuth's foundation in September 1996. Thanaboon wrote 14 cheques worth 300,000 baht each to the foundation as repayment. Thanaboon's banks returned the cheques unpaid, and Sereepisuth sued Thanaboon. Thanaboon was acquitted by the Criminal Court but convicted on appeal. He later appealed to the Supreme Court, arguing the loan agreement violated the foundation's objectives and regulations, and that the interest rate was above Bank of Thailand limits. On 8 February 2007, the Supreme Court upheld Thanaboon's conviction in which Thanaboon was sentenced to 40 months in jail.

=== Kühne + Nagel tax evasion controversy ===
On 8 March 2007, Akbar Khan submitted a request to investigate alleged tax evasion by Kühne + Nagel to Sereepisuth in his office. Two weeks later, Sereepisuth's secretaries claimed that the request was lost. The request was later resubmitted to Sereepisuth's deputies. Khan claimed that the deputies noted that the case was not worthy of investigation. When questioned about the matter by Khan in public, Sereepisuth said he could not recall meeting with him, but promised to follow up on the matter.

=== Removal from office ===
Sereepisuth was removed from office in April 2008 by the elected government of Samak Sundaravej under charges of corruption. His supporters, however, claim that these charges are put-up jobs to punish him for prosecuting many cases against the militarily deposed former premier Thaksin Shinawatra.

== Political careers ==
=== 25th National Assembly of Thailand ===
Sereepisuth reemerged in the politics of Thailand, becoming a member to the House of Representative through his Party List as the first listed.

Despite the previous merits received from military junta, Sereepisuth actively shows opposition to Prayut Chan-o-cha, the Prime Minister from another junta. His expression of opposition, often through stoic sarcasm and real actions, circulates sproadicaly among Thai Netizens as political dark humor.

=== The Committee on Corruption Prevention and Suppression ===
Sereepisuth was nominated the chairman of the committee on corruption prevention and suppression.

In the post, Sereepisuth actively engages in anti-corruption, especially against the government party's affiliations. Among his list of investigations were Sira Jenjaka and Pareena Kraikupt, fellow committee members from the Palang Pracharath Party who had been known to 'actively pester' him. They had been deposed from the house of representative after being thoroughly debunked of their misqualifications by Sereepisuth.

=== 26th National Assembly of Thailand ===
Sereepisuth continued his political career after the Dissolution of Parliament. The result of 2023 Thai general election saw Thai Liberal Party not receiving enough vote for one full party list member, but nonetheless enough for partial round-up, granting Sereepisuth a seat in the House of Representative as the sole member of his party. On May 22 that year, before the results were certified by the Election Committee, Sereepisuth, as the leader of his party, signed a historical memorandum of understanding with seven other parties, led by Move Forward Party and Pheu Thai Party, forming a coalition that aspired to form the new government. On July 4, Sereepisuth approved Pita in his nomination to be the next prime minister, an approval that had been rendered futile.

Sereepisuth's apparent political stance took a vicious turn after the Parliament failed to provide enough approval vote for Pita to become the prime minister. On the day the Parliament voted whether Pita could be renominated, he skipped the meeting, and shortly after, stated harsh and controversial comments against the younger people, so-called "orange dom", who are mostly voters of the Move Forward Party. Since then, he openly declared displeasure against the youngsters, and openly declared that he would later take legal action against them after the government is formed.

The most devastating actions so far was when Sereepisuth targeted a certain MP from the Move Forward Party, Nakornchai Khunnarong, who had a criminal record and served prison time, more than a decade before the election, in attempt to charge for misqualifications. Nakornchai, in response, immediately announced to resign from his seat before any actions were taken, admitting to the record, but nevertheless claimed his innocence in the case.

== See also ==
- Sonthi Boonyaratkalin
- Council for National Security
- Surayud Chulanont
- Kowit Wattana

Police appointments
Preceded by Kowit Wattana	Commissioner-General of the Royal Thai Police; 2007–2008	Succeeded by Patcharawat Wongsuwan
Party political offices
Vacant Title last held by Phaibun Phungthonglo	Leader of Thai Liberal Party; 2018–present	Incumbent
