= Thai Liberal Party =

Political party in Thailand

Thai Liberal Party พรรคเสรีรวมไทย
- Abbreviation: TLP
- Leader: Sereepisuth Temeeyaves
- Secretary-General: Suwit Kittitaranon
- Founder: Paiboon Puangthonglor
- Founded: 29 August 2013
- Headquarters: Bangkok
- Ideology: Progressive conservatism Antimilitarism
- Political position: Centre to centre-right
- Colours: Yellow
- House of Representatives: 1 / 500

Website
- sereeruamthai.or.th

The Thai Liberal Party (Thai: พรรคเสรีรวมไทย, RTGS: Phak Seri Ruam Thai, lit. 'Thai United Liberal Party'; abbreviated TLP) is a political party in Thailand founded in 2013 by Paiboon Puangthonglor. On 26 December 2013, the first party executive board resigned from the party to prepare for a change in its executive committee by inviting former Commissioner of the Royal Thai Police Police General Seripisut Temiyavet. The party has a reformist agenda of curbing the power of the military and reducing corruption. As part of the party's political programme, Seripisut has suggested moving military bases out of Bangkok and renting the land to schools, hospitals and parks or to fund similar public amenities, and consolidating "unnecessary" military formations. Seripisut noted, however, that the "police need to be in Bangkok".

== Election results ==
=== General elections ===
Election	Total seats won	Popular vote	Share of votes	Outcome of election	Election leader
2019	10 / 500	824,284	2.32%	▲10 seats; Opposition	Seripisut Temiyavet
2023	1 / 500	273,669	0.70%	▼9 seats; Junior partner in governing coalition (2023-2024) Opposition (2024-Present)	Seripisut Temiyavet

=== Bangkok Metropolitan Council elections ===
Election	Total seats won	Popular vote	Share of votes	Outcome of election
2022	0 / 50	5,496	0.24%	No members in Bangkok Metropolitan Council
