= Thai Pakdee Party =

Thai Pakdee Party พรรคไทยภักดี
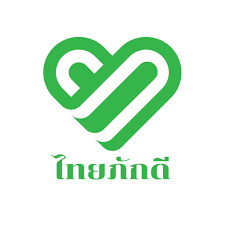
- Leader: Warong Detkitvikrom
- Secretary-General: Patiyut Thongprachong
- Founded: 24 August 2021; 5 years ago
- Split from: Democrat Party
- Membership (2022): 13,301
- Ideology: Monarchism; Reactionary conservatism; Right-wing populism; Anti-immigration
- Political position: Far-right
- Colours: Green (since 2023)
- House of Representatives: 1 / 500

Website
- thaipakdee.org

The Thai Pakdee Party (Thai: พรรคไทยภักดี, lit. 'Thai Loyalty Party') is a right-wing populist and monarchist political party in Thailand. It was established in 2021 by Warong Detkitvikrom.

== Activities ==
The party was established in 2021 by Warong Dechkitvikrom, a former doctor and former Member of Parliament of Phitsanulok Province under the Democrat Party.

Later on Sunday, 26 June 2022, the Thai Phakdi Party held its 2/2022 Annual General Meeting to elect additional party executive committees. The meeting resolved to elect Thepparat Rangsit, grandson of Her Royal Highness Vibhavadi Rangsit and great-grandson of Prince Rangsit Prayurasakdi and Worachat Jintaprateepkowit as the party's executive committee.
