= LGBTQ rights in Thailand =

- Thailand
- Legal status: Legal before 1903; Legal since 1956; age of consent equalized in 1997
- Gender identity: Change of legal gender not recognised even if the applicant has undergone sex reassignment surgery (bill proposed to allow gender changes)
- Military: Since 2005
- Discrimination protections: Sexual orientation and gender identity protections since 2015

Family rights
- Recognition of relationships: Same-sex marriage since 2025
- Adoption: Full adoption rights since 2025

The rights of lesbian, gay, bisexual, transgender, and queer (LGBTQ) people in Thailand are regarded as some of the most comprehensive of those in Asia. Both male and female same-sex sexual activity are legal. Legalization of same-sex marriage and adoption of children by married same-sex couples was signed into law in 2024, and came into force on 23 January 2025. Thailand was the first Asian UN member state to pass a comprehensive same-sex marriage law, making it the 38th country in the world to do so. About 8% of the Thai population, five million people, are thought to be in the LGBTQ demographic.

In 2013, the Bangkok Post said that "while Thailand is viewed as a tourist haven for same-sex couples, the reality for locals is that the law, and often public sentiment, is not so liberal." A 2014 report by the United States Agency for International Development and the United Nations Development Programme said that LGBTQ people "still face discrimination affecting their social rights and job opportunities", and "face difficulty gaining acceptance for non-traditional sexuality, even though the tourism authority has been promoting Thailand as a gay-friendly country".

Changes in attitudes and public policy towards LGBTQ issues began to occur in Thailand during the 1990s and, in particular, the early part of the 21st century. In 2015, Thailand enacted a comprehensive anti-discrimination law, which covered sexual orientation and gender identity. In 2022, a group of bills were introduced in the Thai parliament that would have granted either civil partnerships or full marriage for same-sex couples, but did not reach their final readings before parliament was dissolved for the 2023 elections and consequently lapsed. In November 2023, the Srettha Thavisin-led Cabinet approved a draft same-sex marriage bill, which was considered by Parliament on 21 December 2023 along with three similar drafts proposed by opposition parties and the civil sector. All four passed overwhelmingly and was combined into one bill, which passed the House of Representatives on 27 March 2024 and the Senate on 18 June 2024.

== Legality of same-sex sexual activity ==
Private, adult, consensual, and non-commercial sodomy was decriminalized in Thailand in 1956. However, same-sex attraction and transgender identities were still seen as socially unacceptable in many cases: those whose gender expression or behavior falls out of social norms are less likely to be tolerated or accepted. Through the Penal Code Amendment Act of 1997 (Thai: พระราชบัญญัติแก้ไขเพิ่มเติมประมวลกฎหมายอาญา-(ฉบับที่-14)-พ.ศ.-2540), the age of consent was set at fifteen years regardless of gender or sexual orientation. In 2002, the Ministry of Health announced that homosexuality would no longer be regarded as a mental illness or disorder. In 2007, the Thai Government expanded the definition of a sexual assault and rape victim to include both women and men. The government also prohibited marital rape, with the law stipulating that women or men can be victims.

Thailand has officially legalized same-sex marriage, becoming the first Southeast Asian nation to do so after King Maha Vajiralongkorn approved the bill on 24 September 2024. The law, effective in 120 days of it's passing, grants same-sex couples full legal rights, marking a significant milestone for LGBTQ+ rights in the region.

== Recognition of same-sex relationships and marriage ==
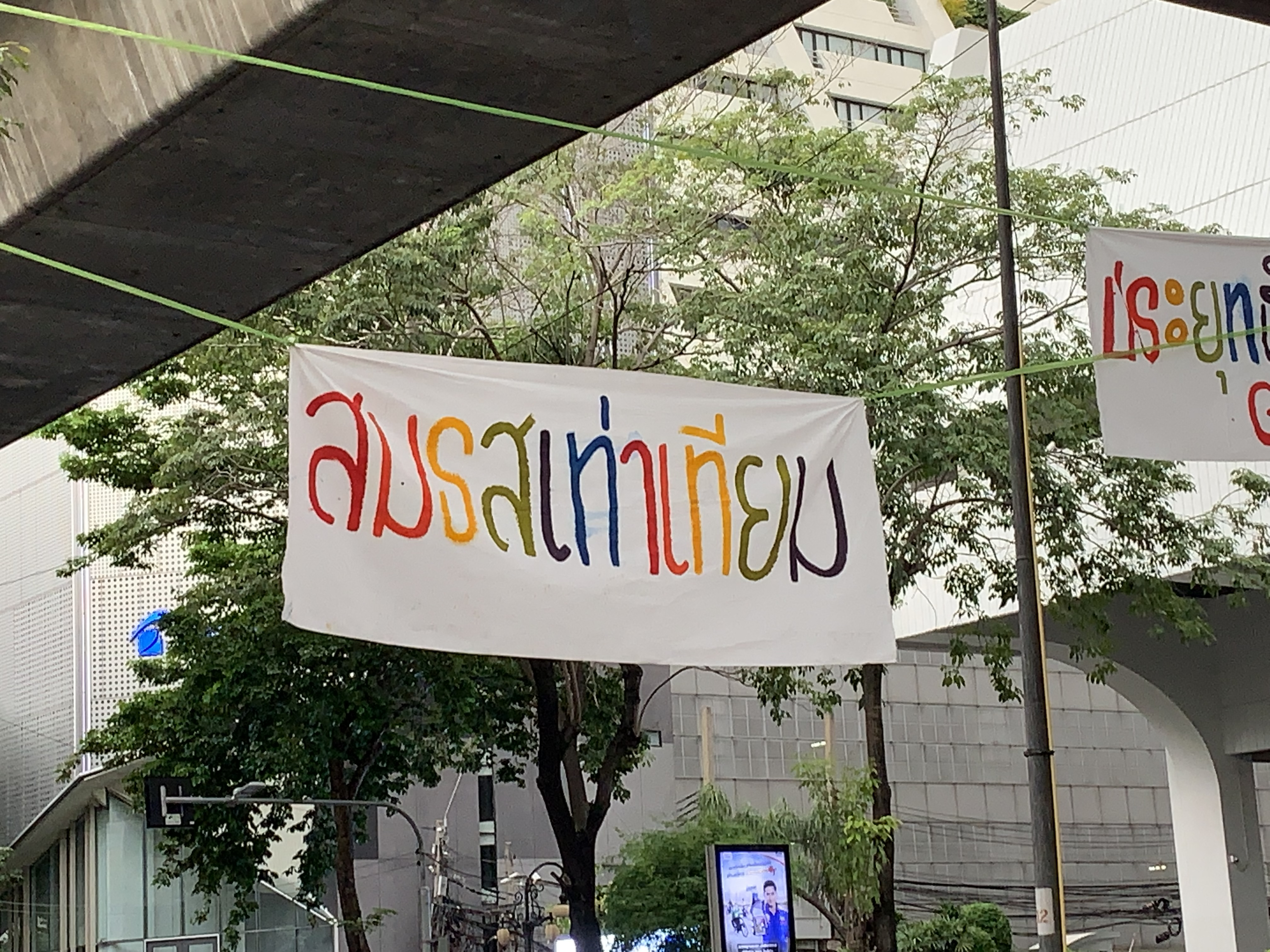
A sign reading "สมรสเท่าเทียม" (Thai for "equal marriage"; a recurring slogan calling for same-sex marriage legalisation in Thailand) at Bangkok Pride 2022

Thailand began performing and recognizing same-sex marriages on 23 January 2025. Thai opinion polls have consistently favoured legal recognition of same-sex marriages.

In June 2020, Move Forward Party deputy Tunyawaj Kamolwongwat introduced a bill to legalize same-sex marriage. The public consultation on the bill was launched on 2 July.

"Marriage is when a man and a woman are willing to live together, to build a husband and wife relationship to reproduce their offspring, under the morals, traditions, religion and the laws of each society. Marriage is, therefore, reserved for only a man and a woman."

— A Constitutional Court judge, 2021

In 2021, the Constitutional Court ruled that Section 1448 of the Civil and Commercial Code interpreting marriages as only between women and men is constitutional, but after the release of full ruling, one phrase mentioned that members of the LGBTQ community cannot reproduce, as it is against nature, and they are unlike other animals with unusual behaviours or physical characteristics. The verdict cites LGBTQ as a different "species" that needs to be separated and studied as it is incapable of creating the "delicate bond" of human relationships. The text was criticised by the LGBTQ community as homophobic and pseudo-scientific.

In 2022, a group of bills concerning same-sex unions passed their first readings in the Thai National Assembly. These include the Marriage Equality Bill proposed by the opposition Move Forward Party, which would amend the current marriage law to include couples of any gender, and the government-proposed Civil Partnership Bill, which would instead introduce civil partnerships as a separate category, granting some but not all rights given to married couples. Despite several amendments, neither bill passed the Parliament before the end of the session.

On 14 February 2023, Bangkok's Dusit district became the first jurisdiction in Thailand to issue partnership certificates, which are legally non-binding, to same-sex couples.

In November 2023 Prime Minister Srettha Thavisin of the Pheu Thai Party announced that his Cabinet had approved a draft same-sex marriage law. Besides the government's version, three similar draft bills were also submitted by the Move Forward Party, the Democrat Party, and the civil sector, with all four entering parliamentary debate on 21 December.

In March 2024, Thailand's lower house passed the bill with 400 voting in favor to 10 opposing it. All major parties in the country had pledged to support the bill. On April 1, the senate approved the first reading of the bill with 147 votes for, 4 against, and 7 abstaining. On 18 June 2024, Thailand passed the same-sex marriage bill with the approval of 130 of the 152 members of the Senate in attendance, with 4 voting against it and 18 abstaining. It received the king's formal endorsement and was published in the Royal Gazette on 24 September 2024, and became effective 120 days later on 23 January 2025. The amendment to the Civil and Commercial Code replaces the terms "men and women" and "husband and wife" with the words "individuals" and "spouses". The law also allows same-sex couples to jointly adopt children. Thailand was the first Asian UN member state to pass a comprehensive same-sex marriage law, making it the 38th country in the world.

== Adoption and parenting ==
On 23 January 2025, adoption of children by married same-sex couples became legal in Thailand as a result of the Marriage Equality Act. However, single people and unmarried couples regardless of their sexual orientation or sex are not allowed to adopt children. The only exception is for single women petitioning for the adoption of a special-needs child.

Married same-sex couples are also expected to have access to in vitro fertilisation (IVF) at some point, but that requires a change in the law. Since the Marriage Equality Act came into force, the Ministry of Public Health has been working to amend the surrogacy law, but it is unclear how long that will take.

The bill to legalize adoption by same-sex couples was approved by the Thai parliament in June 2024. It was later signed into law by the King. The new law, however, does not change the existing adoption legislation to replace the terms "mother" and "father" with the gender neutral term "parent". LGBTQ activists have expressed concern that without this change there is risk to the parental rights of same-sex couples.

Thailand had long been a popular destination for surrogacy arrangements. In 2015, however, the Thai Parliament passed a law banning foreigners from travelling to Thailand to have commercial surrogacy arrangements. Only married couples as Thai residents are allowed to make commercial surrogacy contracts.

A 2024 poll found that 82% of surveyed Thais agreed that same-sex couples should have the same rights to adoption as opposite-sex couples. Of the 26 surveyed countries from around the world, Thailand ranked as number 1 in public support for adoption rights of same-sex couples.

== Discrimination protections ==
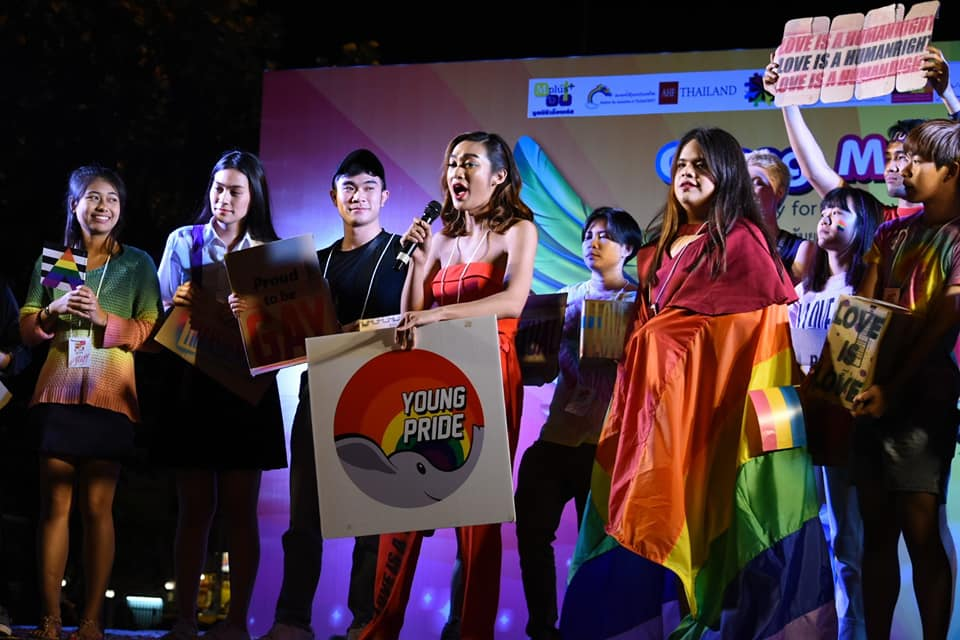
Chiang Mai Pride Parade of 2019, commemorating the Sao Saw Et riot in 2009

None of the various Thai constitutions has mentioned sexual orientation or gender identity. Natee Theerarojnapong, of the Human Rights Commission, and Anjana Suvarnananda, a lesbian rights advocate, campaigned unsuccessfully for the inclusion of "sexual identity" in the Interim Constitution of 2006 and the Constitution of 2007. The 2007 Constitution did contain a broad prohibition of "unfair discrimination" based on "personal status" and promises to respect various civil liberties in accordance with "state security" and "public morality".

The Gender Equality Act B.E. 2558 (Thai: พระราชบัญญัติความเท่าเทียมระหว่างเพศ พ.ศ.๒๕๕๘) was passed on 13 March 2015 and came into force on 9 September 2015. This act bans discrimination based on gender identity and sexual orientation, and was the first law in Thailand to contain language mentioning LGBTQ people. Under the law, discrimination against a male, female or "a person who has a sexual expression different from that person's original sex" is punishable by up to six months in prison and a fine of up to 20,000 baht. However, the law specified an exception for "education, religion and the public interest", which was strongly criticised by women's rights groups. According to a 2021 Human Rights Watch report, implementation of the law has been spotty and inadequate. A 2019 UNDP report found that only 44% of LGBTQ respondents knew about this law, compared to 50% of non-LGBTQ respondents.

== Gender identity and expression ==
Gender-affirming surgeries have been performed in Thailand since 1975, and Thailand is among the most popular destinations globally for patients seeking such operations. Puberty blockers and cross sex hormones are also available to minors in Thailand. Transgender people are quite common in Thai popular entertainment, television shows and nightclub performances; however, transgender people lack various legal rights compared to the rest of the population, and may face discrimination from society.

Transgender people face substantial barriers to employment, including full-time work, executive positions or promotions, according to 2015 research for the International Labour Organization. Discrimination in job applications also often discourages transgender people from seeking further employment opportunities or entering the job market. The research also found that they are faced with "daily discrimination and humiliation" which often cuts short their careers. An editorial in the Bangkok Post in 2013 noted that "we don't find transgenders as high-ranking officials, doctors, lawyers, scientists, or teachers in state-run schools and colleges. Nor as executives in the corporate world. In short, the doors of government agencies and large corporations are still closed to transgender women."

In 2007, the Thai National Assembly debated allowing transgender people to legally change their names after having a sex change operation. The legislature passed a law named Persons' Name Act which created an avenue for transgender people to change their names but not their legal gender. Approval of the request for name change is not guaranteed, as it is up to the discretion of individual administrators.

Post-operation male-to-female transgender government employees are not granted the right to wear female uniforms at work, and are still expected to perform military service. Specific cases of inequality include a hospital which refused to allow a transgender woman to stay in a woman's ward, even though she had undergone sex reassignment surgery.

In 2014, a Matthayom 1 textbook was criticized for discrimination and lack of gender sensitivity, due to a description of transgender people as suffering from gender confusion, khon long phet (คนหลงเพศ), and illustrations in the textbook featuring performances by transgender dancers. Critics argued that the word long (หลง: 'confused') had negative connotations, and that "transgender" or kham phet (ข้ามเพศ) was more suitable. It was reported that officials at the Ministry of Education would investigate the matter.

In July 2019, a proposal to regulate sex changes for transgender individuals was presented to the National Assembly. Among others, the proposed bill would allow those who have undergone sex reassignment surgery to change their legal gender on official documents. It also covers name changes, marriage rights and military conscription.

== Military service ==
In Thailand, both men and women are allowed to serve in the army. In 2005, the Thai Armed Forces lifted their ban on LGBT people serving in the military. Prior to this reform, LGBTQ people were exempted as suffering from a "mental disorder".

All Thai citizens aged 21 and over who were assigned male at birth are required to participate in military conscription. Unless exempt, they must either volunteer to serve between six months and a year, or participate in a lottery drawing that determines who will serve from one to two years. Conscripts have been reported to sometimes face harassment, violence, and even human rights violations, and conscription is viewed with anxiety by many. Transgender women are exempt from conscription on the basis of having "gender identity disorder", but only if they can "prove" their gender. If a trans woman has undergone at least some gender-affirming medical procedures, such as hormone replacement therapy or breast augmentation, she has a high chance of being exempt after going through a medical examination which can be stressful and humiliating to some. Those who have not are required to submit to extensive psychological evaluation.

== Blood donation ==
In Thailand, transgender women who have not had sex with a male partner, (Note: The source does not elaborate on whether "male partner" means a cisgender male or someone who was assigned male at birth regardless of their gender identity.) as well as women who have sex with women (WSW) are allowed to donate blood, but men who have sex with men (MSM) are not. In May 2009 and October 2021, the Thai Red Cross Society reaffirmed its ban on MSM becoming blood donors, despite campaigns to change this policy. In 2021, the organization stated that "it is not yet ready to relax the strict criteria for blood donors" for MSM because of the higher risk of HIV. The rate of HIV in first-time blood donors is 10 times higher than the same rate in other Asian countries. The Thai Red Cross defended this ban as practical as opposed to discriminatory. It also stated that the rate of HIV among donors must fall below 1 in 100,000 before the criteria for donations by MSM are relaxed.

== Living conditions ==
=== Homophobia, biphobia, transphobia and violence ===
In 2009, a scheduled pride parade in Chiang Mai was violently protested by some members of the local community leading to its eventual cancellation. The incident would later be known as "Saturday the 21st" and is considered an important event in the history of violence against the LGBTQ community in Thailand. It is considered an important event in Thai LGBTQ history and was compared to the Stonewall Riots in the US. The date, 21 February, has been annually observed as the day against violence against LGBTQ in Thailand.

In 2016, Paisarn Likhitpreechakul, a board member of the Sogi Foundation, wrote an op-ed in the Bangkok Post warning of so-called corrective rape being widely used to "cure" lesbians of their sexual orientation, highlighting the case of a father in Loei who confessed to raping his 14-year-old daughter for four years to stop her from socialising with tomboys. Paisarn expressed further concern that such practices were being normalised in Thai society, and that the true number of such cases was far higher, as many murders of Thai LGBT people are categorised as crimes of passion, because the Thai legal system does not include the concept of hate crimes. The United Nations Office of the High Commissioner for Human Rights identified murder, beatings, kidnappings, rape and sexual assault against LGBTQ people as examples of homophobic and transphobic violence, and noted that violence against LGBTQ people "tends to be especially vicious compared to other bias-motivated crimes".

A 2019 UNDP survey showed that 53% of LGBTQ respondents had faced verbal harassment, 16% have been sexually assaulted, and 42% have pretended to be straight in order to be accepted in various settings. 47.5% of the respondents had experienced at least one form of discrimination from within their family. As a result of stigma and discrimination, 49% of the LGBTQ respondents said that they have contemplated suicide, and 17% that they had attempted to take their lives. Despite their high need for mental health services, LGBTQ respondents reported difficulty in finding access to such services, as well as discrimination in health care. Two LGBTQ community subgroups reported the highest levels of discrimination: trans women and bisexual men. 61% of trans women reported verbal abuse, 22% shared they had been sexually assaulted, 11% faced physical abuse, and 8% reported police harassment. Among bisexual men, 14% reported having lost friends because of their sexuality, and 9% have lost their homes because of it.

The same report found that 32% of trans women surveyed faced discrimination in the workplace. The number was 10% for the LGBTQ community overall.

=== Education ===
On 26 December 1996, in a report in the Bangkok Post, the Rajabat Institute Council, the collective governing body of all of Thailand's colleges, declared that it would ban homosexuals from enrolling in any of its teacher training schools, the idea of Deputy Education Minister Suraporn Danaitangtrakul. The announcement was strongly criticised by human rights groups and many others, who urged the repeal of the policy. On 25 January 1997, Danaitangtrakul proposed that the Institute set new criteria to ban people with "improper personalities", but not specific groups such as homosexuals.

According to a 2014 UNDP report, LGBTQ youth can face significant barriers to education because of their identities. A third of surveyed LGBTQ students had been physically harassed, a quarter sexually. Bullying of LGBTQ students ranged from verbal to severe physical or sexual abuse. The 2015 Gender Equality Act B.E. 2558 makes exceptions for discrimination in educational settings. Toms (masculine women) appeared to be one of the most harassed groups.

The report found that there was no mandatory education on sexual orientation or gender identity. Sexual health education was also found to be inadequate, which can contribute to unsafe sex prevalence and the spread of HIV among the LGBTQ community. Some SexEd textbooks contained references to homosexuality as "abnormal". Furthermore, most Thai schools require uniforms, and students are expected to wear a gendered uniform according to the sex they were assigned at birth. This discriminatory policy leads to discomfort and mental trauma for transgender students and many drop out of school. A lack of educational qualifications leads many LGBTQ Thais to "sex work or other forms of high-risk behaviour and risky employment in order to make ends meet."

=== Prisons ===
For several years, the official policy of Thai prisons has been to respect and recognize sexual diversity, placing inmates in cells based on their stated gender and sexual orientation. Homosexual male prisoners, like all male prisoners, have their heads shaved. Female inmates are not allowed to wear make-up, but gay male inmates are. A prisoner's gender is "verified" by a prison doctor, meaning that only trans women or kathoeys (transgender women or effeminate gay men) who have transitioned medically are placed with other women. However, kathoeys who have not transitioned medically can request to be placed with other kathoeys like them which, according to a 2016 interview, can be safer. According to the Department of Corrections, there were 4,448 LGBTQ prisoners in the country in 2016. Of these, 1,804 were katoey, 352 were gay (เกย์), 1,247 were tom (ทอม; female with masculine characteristics), 1,011 were dee (ดี้; female homosexual with feminine characteristics), and 34 were male-to-female transgender people.

In 2016, the Department of Corrections had plans to build a central prison for only LGBTQ inmates. However, plans were delayed because of concerns about placing LGBTQ inmates away from their hometowns and relatives.

=== Politics ===
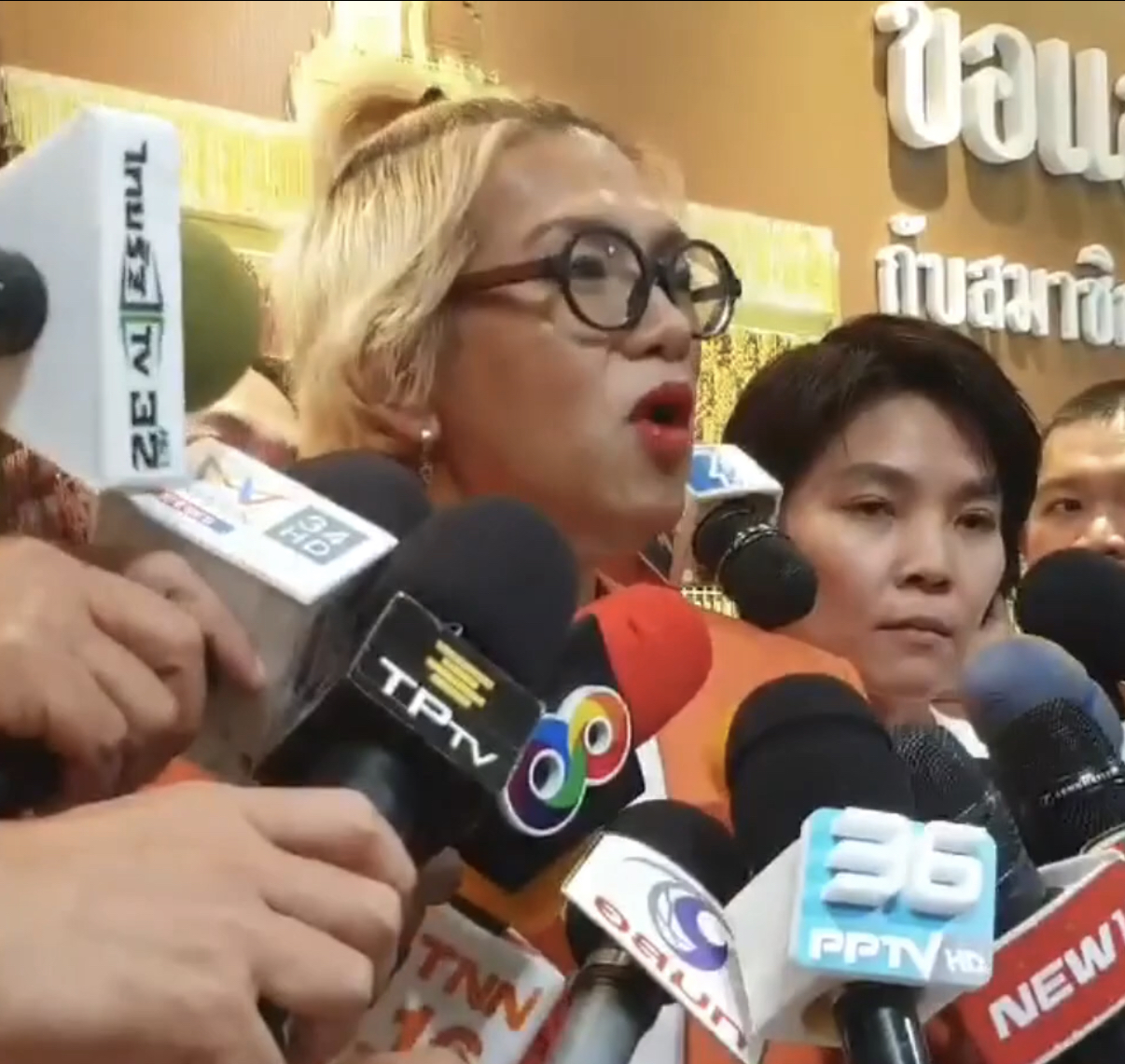
Tanwarin Sukkhapisit, the first transgender MP in Thailand

Ahead of the 2019 general election, several political parties expressed support for same-sex marriage and LGBTQ rights. The Future Forward Party called for the legalisation of same-sex marriage and amendments to the official school curriculum "so that it no longer propagates stereotypes and prejudice against the LGBTQ community". The Mahachon Party, the Thai Local Power Party, the Polamuang Thai Party, the Thai Liberal Party, the Puea Chat Party, the Commoners' Party and the Democrat Party all expressed support for same-sex marriage. The Pheu Thai Party, the largest party in Parliament in 2019, also supports same-sex marriage. The Thai Raksa Chart Party, banned in March 2019 due to the involvement of Princess Ubol Ratana, stated that it supported civil partnerships for same-sex couples.

In March 2019, transgender filmmaker Tanwarin Sukkhapisit of the Future Forward Party was elected to the Thai Parliament, becoming its first ever transgender MP. Three other transgender candidates from the same party, Tunyawaj Kamonwongwat, Nateepat Kulsetthasith, and Kawinnath Takey, were also elected.

Support for same-sex marriage was promoted by both the Pheu Thai Party and the Move Forward Party, the de facto successor to the Future Forward Party, during the 2023 election. While the Move Forward Party won the plurality of seats in the House of Representatives, the resulting government was formed by Pheu Thai with the support of more conservative parties in the Senate.

== Summary table ==
Same-sex sexual activity legal	Yes (Before 1903, Since 1956)
Equal age of consent (15)	Yes (Since 1997)
Anti-discrimination laws in employment	Yes (Since 2015)
Anti-discrimination laws in the provision of goods and services	Yes (Since 2015)
Anti-discrimination laws in all other areas (incl. indirect discrimination, hate speech)	No (Never specified)
Anti-discrimination laws in education	No (Never specified)
Same-sex marriage	Yes (Since 2025)
Recognition of same-sex couples	Yes (Since 2025)
Stepchild adoption by same-sex couples	Yes (Since 2025)
Joint adoption by same-sex couples	Yes (Since 2025)
LGBTQ people allowed to serve openly in the military	Yes (Since 2005)
Right to change legal gender	No (Pending)
Right to change sex surgically	Yes (Never specified)
Third gender option	No (Pending)
Adoption by single people regardless of sexual orientation	Yes (Except by single females for children with 'special needs')
Conversion therapy banned on minors	Yes
Intersex minors protected from invasive surgical procedures	No
Homosexuality declassified as an illness	Yes (Since 2002)
Access to IVF for lesbians	Yes (As part of a married couple, Since 2025)
Commercial surrogacy for gay male couples	Yes (Only married couples can access surrogacy)
MSMs allowed to donate blood	No (Indefinite deferral period)

== See also ==
- Anjaree
- Human rights in Thailand
- Kathoey
- LGBTQ history in Thailand
- LGBTQ rights in Asia
