= Gender Recognition Bill (Thailand) =

Gender Recognition Bill (draft)

Parliament of Thailand
- Territorial extent: Thailand
- Considered by: House of Representatives

Legislative history
- First reading: 21 February 2024
- Voting summary: 154 voted for; 257 voted against; 1 abstained; 1 present not voting
- Status: Pending

The Gender Recognition Bill is a proposed Thai law to allow people to choose their gender title and provide a gender neutral option for those choosing not to identify as male or female.

== Background ==
Following the passage of the landmark Marriage Equality Act, which went into effect in January 2025, civil society groups have urged the government to pass the Gender Recognition Bill. Marriages between transgender and intersex individuals performed under the Marriage Equality Act can feature gender titles to do not match their gender identities.

== Legislative history ==
In early 2024, then-Move Forward Party MP Tunyawaj Kamolwongwat proposed the draft Gender Recognition Bill. The law was based on similar legislation passed in Malta and Argentina. On 21 February 2024, the first draft was rejected by the House of Representatives 257 to 154, with one abstention and one vote not cast.

As of January 2025, there are four versions of the bill, including a version drafted by the Ministry of Social Development and Human Security, and three proposed by the People's Party, Intersex Thailand, and a civil society organization.

== Public reaction ==
Bangkok Pride 2025, which lasted from 30 May 2025 to 1 June 2025, had the theme "Born This Way", and organizer Waaddao Chumaporn expressed support for the bill as a crucial step in Thailand's bid to host World Pride 2030.

In June 2025, Siriluck Chiengwong, Head of Office of United Nations Population Fund (UNFPA) Thailand, noted the bill "presents a crucial opportunity to bridge legal gaps for individuals with diverse gender identities."

In a June 2025 interview with the Bangkok Post, former Prime Minister Srettha Thavisin expressed support for the bill.
