= Pauline Ngarmpring =

Thai politician

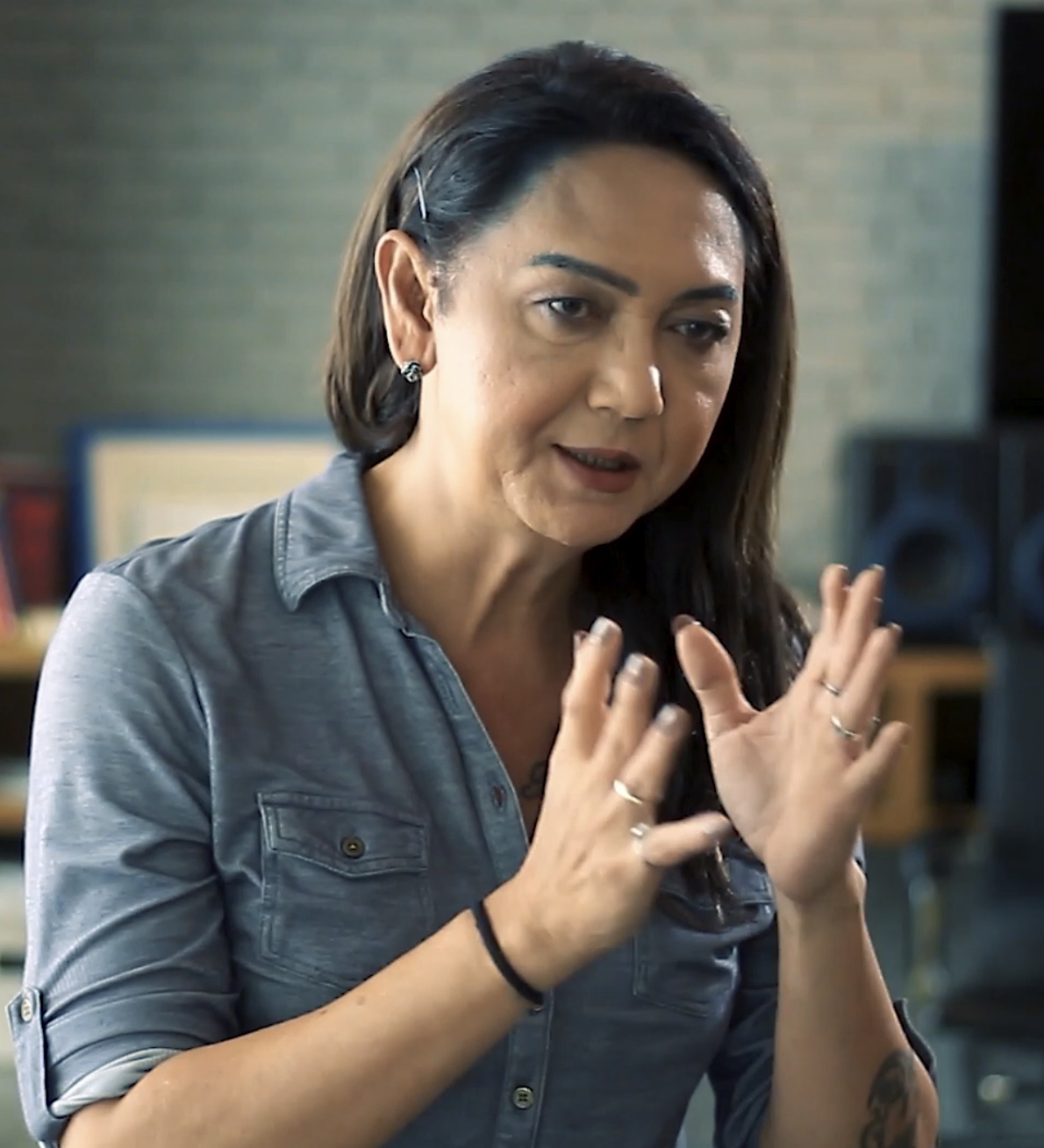
- Born: 1964 (age 61–62)
- Occupation: Politician
- Known for: first transgender person to run for Prime Minister of Thailand
- Political party: Mahachon Party
- Children: 2

Pauline Ngarmpring (Thai: พอลลีน งามพริ้ง, also Palinee Ngarm-Pring) is a Thai politician. In March 2019, she ran for Prime Minister of Thailand, becoming the country's first transgender person to do so. She is affiliated with the Mahachon Party.

== Biography ==
In 1964, Pauline Ngarmpring was born male in Thailand. She later admitted she identified as a woman from an early age, but did not tell anyone due to the expectations of her parents.

Before her transition, Ngarmpring worked as a journalist before becoming a sports promoter in the Thai football community. She founded the football fan group Cheerthai Power, as well as ran for president of the Football Association of Thailand. She was also married with two children.

In 2013, she came out as a transgender woman, travelling to America to have sex reassignment surgery. In 2017, she returned to Thailand, where local media outlets dubbed her "Thailand's Caitlyn Jenner".

== Political career ==
Ngarmpring joined the Mahachon Party in late 2018; she was initially hired to assist the party with their strategy and policy. In 2019, she was named, along with two others, as the Mahachon Party's prime minister candidates in the 2019 Thai general election. This made her the first transgender individual to run for Prime Minister of Thailand. She stated that she had no expectations of winning the election, since her party was only aiming for "six or seven seats" in the lower house of government. However, she hoped that her candidacy would help to educate people in Thailand about the country's LGBT community.

== See also ==
- LGBTQ rights in Thailand
- LGBTQ history in Thailand
