= Guanyin Lanlanphak =

- กวนอิม ล้านล้านภาค
- Born: January 15, 1964 (age 62); Chonburi province, Thailand
- Other name: Maechi Lee Kiau Huat (แม่ชีหลีเกี่ยวฮวด)
- Years active: 2012-present
- Known for: Guanyin costume and exaggerated makeup
- Criminal charges: Theft

Guanyin Lanlanphak (Thai: กวนอิม ล้านล้านภาค, romanized: Kuanaim Lanlanphak; born 15 January 1964) is a female thief in Thailand. She became an Internet celebrity because of her pale and exaggerated makeup, dressed as Guanyin.

== Biography ==
On March 24, 2012, the Bang Lamung district Police Department in Chonburi received a report from a 17-year-old female tourist that her iPhone was stolen by a woman who claimed to be possessed by Guanyin at the fifth-floor base of the Guanyin statue in the "Ban Sukhawadee" (บ้านสุขาวดี). The police then arrested a woman dressed as Guanyin, named "Guanyin Lanlanphak", 48-years-old. After interrogation, she admitted the crime and returned the stolen goods.

On May 21, 2013, residents in Chonburi Province found a car covered with gold foil, printed with Thai and Chinese characters, and painted with images of deities, resembling a moving "shrine". According to a reporter from Channel 3, this golden car will be traveling around Chonburi Province, and its owner is Guanyin Lanlanphak. Guanyin claimed that the car belonged to her, claiming that she wanted to "save all living beings" and had just returned from Chiang Rai Province to give alms; because many disciples came to visit her, she parked the car outside the temple, which attracted great attention from residents.

On December 8, 2014, some netizens spotted Guanyin Lanlanphak driving a golden Toyota sedan with flags with Chinese characters on it, stopping at a 7-Eleven convenience store to shop. The Traffic Command and Control Center forwarded the photo on the social platform, with the caption "The deities support 7-11" (เทพมาอุดหนุน7-11).

On the evening of April 25, 2016, Twitter user @AquariusNick tweeted and attached a group of photos, saying that he encountered Guanyin Lanlanphak standing on the roadside in downtown Bangkok and hailing a taxi. At that time, many taxi drivers avoided her, thinking they had encountered a "ghost", until a bold driver was willing to take her in the car.

== Name change controversy ==
On May 23, 2013, the Department of Provincial Administration stated that it was not actually possible to issue an ID card in the name of "Guanyin Lanlanphak", pointing out that the person had changed her name several times and that the ID photo was covered in heavy makeup.

According to Si Bun Rueang district, Nakhon Phanom Province Governor Nathawat Wiriyanphaphorn (ณัฐวัฒน์ วิริยานภาพร), the woman had applied to change her name. Her original name was "Duangathitsawang Lanlanphak" (ดวงอาทิตย์สว่าง ล้านล้านภาค), which was changed to Guanyin Lanlanphak (กวนอิม ล้านล้านภาค); after the system check, no problems were found, so she was allowed to register under this name. As for Guanyin's ID photo, the county magistrate believed that it was a personal right and that the basic principle for ID photo processing was that one should not wear glasses, hats or other items that cover the face. Compared with her old ID photo, "there was not much difference". At the same time, they also checked whether she had used an identity fraudulently or forged documents, but found nothing, so they approved her ID application.

The Director of the ID Card Department of the Administrative Office clearly stated that heavy makeup and hats should not be approved for ID card issuance, and the woman had changed her name several times earlier. Initially named "Jansongsaengsawang" (จันทร์ส่องแสงสว่าง), later changed to "Duangathitsawang" (ดวงอาทิตย์สว่าง), until she changed her name to "Guanyin" (กวนอิม), her surname has always been Lanlanphak (ล้านล้านภาค).

== In popular culture ==
In the Thai Internet group "Page-Nong" (เพจน้อง), "Universe of Page-Nong" uses the images of Guanyin Lanlanphak, Dhammajayo, most Thai Internet celebrities and LGBT peoples.
