= Demographics of Thailand =

- Population: 65,951,210 (8 Jan 2025)
- Growth rate: ▼ −0.14 (2022 est.)
- Birth rate: 7.0 births/1,000 population (2024 est.)
- Death rate: 8.7 deaths/1,000 population (2024 est.)
- Life expectancy: 77.66 years
  - male: 74.65 years
  - female: 80.83 years
- Fertility rate: 0.87 children per woman (2025 est.)
- Infant mortality: 6.47 deaths/1,000 live births
- Net migration rate: −0.13 migrant(s)/1,000 population
- Immigrant share: 4.4% (2024)

Age structure
- 0–14 years: ▼14.4% (2025 est.)
- 15–64 years: ▼69.6% (2025 est.)
- 65 and over: ▲16.0% (2025 est.)

Sex ratio
- Total: 0.95 male(s)/female (2022 est.)
- At birth: 1.05 male(s)/female

Nationality
- Nationality: Thai

The demographics of Thailand paint a statistical portrait of the national population. Demography includes such measures as population density and distribution, ethnicity, educational levels, public health metrics, fertility, economic status, religious affiliation, and other characteristics of the populace.

== Population size and structure ==
=== Population ===
The population of Thailand was 65.95 million on 8 January 2025 as per the Department of Provincial Administration. There were 64,953,661 Thai nationals and 997,549 non-Thai residents. Thailand's population is mainly rural: concentrated in the rice growing areas of the central, Isan, and northern regions. In 2010, the urban population—principally in the Bangkok Metropolitan Region —was 45.7 percent of the total population according to the National Economic and Social Development Board (NESDB). Accurate statistics are difficult to arrive at, as millions of Thai migrate from rural areas to cities, then return to their place of origin to help with seasonal field work. Officially they have rural residency, but spend most of the year in urban areas.

Thailand's successful government-sponsored family planning program has resulted in a decline in population growth from 3.1 percent in 1960 to around 0.4 percent in 2015. The World Bank forecasts a contraction of the working-age population of about 10 percent between 2010 and 2040. In 1970, an average of 5.7 people lived in a Thai household. At the time of the 2010 census, the figure was down to 3.2. Even though Thailand has one of the better social security systems in Asia, the increasing population of elderly people is a challenge for the country.

Life expectancy has risen, a reflection of Thailand's efforts to implement effective public health policies. The Thai AIDS epidemic had a major impact on the Thai population. In 2022, over 500,000 Thai were HIV or AIDS positive, approximately 1.1% of adult men and 0.9% of adult women. Every year, 30,000–50,000 Thai die from HIV or AIDS-related illnesses. Ninety percent of them are ages 20–24, the youngest range of the workforce. An aggressive public education campaign begun in the early-1990s reduced the number of new HIV infections from 150,000 to under 10,000 annually. The leading cause of death among the age cohort under 15 years of age: drowning. A study by the Child Safety Promotion and Injury Prevention Centre of Ramathibodi Hospital revealed that more than 1,400 youths under 15 years old died from drowning each year, or an average four deaths a day, becoming the top cause of deaths of children, even exceeding that of motorbike deaths. Thailand's Disease Control Department estimates that only 23 percent of Thai children under 15 can swim. The Public Health Ministry said that from 2006 to 2015, 10,923 children drowned. Of the 8.3 million children aged 5–14 nationwide, only two million can swim, according to the Public Health Ministry.

The United Nations classifies Thailand as an "aging society" (one-tenth of the population above 60), on track to become an "aged society" (one-fifth of the population above 60) by 2025. The Fiscal Policy Office projects that the number of Thais aged 60-plus will increase from 14 percent in 2016 to 17.5 percent in 2020, 21.2 percent in 2025, and 25.2 percent in 2030. As of 2016 it is estimated that there are 94,000 employees aged 60 years or more in the workforce.

View source data.
View source data.
View source data.

=== Age structure ===
Population Estimates by Sex and Age Group (01.VII.2012) (Unrevised data.)

Age group	Male	Female	Total	%
Total	33 328 645	34 583 075	67 911 720	100
0–4	2 041 071	1 938 793	3 979 864	5.86
5–9	2 353 198	2 270 890	4 624 088	6.81
10–14	2 438 774	2 327 414	4 766 188	7.02
15–19	2 593 629	2 473 402	5 067 031	7.46
20–24	2 673 846	2 563 359	5 237 205	7.71
25–29	2 673 201	2 588 947	5 262 148	7.75
30–34	2 683 015	2 637 945	5 320 960	7.84
35–39	2 673 404	2 759 416	5 432 820	8.00
40–44	2 672 891	2 870 531	5 543 422	8.16
45–49	2 574 423	2 769 676	5 344 099	7.87
50–54	2 315 177	2 503 566	4 818 743	7.10
55–59	1 854 719	2 052 030	3 906 749	5.75
60–64	1 347 251	1 534 691	2 881 942	4.24
65–69	963 728	1 154 984	2 118 712	3.12
70–74	695 434	908 033	1 603 467	2.36
75–79	451 737	659 684	1 111 421	1.64
80+	323 147	569 714	892 861	1.31
Age group	Male	Female	Total	Percent
0–14	6 833 043	6 537 097	13 370 140	19.69
15–64	24 061 556	24 753 563	48 815 119	71.88
65+	2 434 046	3 292 415	5 726 461	8.43

Population Estimates by Sex and Age Group (01.VII.2020) (Data refer to national projections.):

Age group	Male	Female	Total	%
Total	32 128 245	34 406 439	66 534 684	100
0–4	1 820 722	1 738 061	3 558 783	5.35
5–9	1 928 856	1 842 729	3 771 584	5.67
10–14	1 994 908	1 899 797	3 894 705	5.85
15–19	2 173 180	2 087 943	4 261 123	6.40
20–24	2 318 425	2 248 622	4 567 047	6.86
25–29	2 328 514	2 291 449	4 619 964	6.94
30–34	2 195 078	2 192 481	4 387 559	6.59
35–39	2 285 522	2 332 154	4 617 676	6.94
40–44	2 519 395	2 633 740	5 153 134	7.75
45–49	2 556 501	2 723 677	5 280 178	7.94
50–54	2 605 281	2 844 482	5 449 763	8.19
55–59	2 320 628	2 612 319	4 932 947	7.41
60–64	1 879 079	2 222 128	4 101 207	6.16
65–69	1 397 242	1 777 088	3 174 330	4.77
70–74	855 143	1 207 640	2 062 783	3.10
75–79	508 729	825 715	1 334 444	2.01
80–84	269 850	508 932	778 781	1.17
85–89	126 009	284 038	410 047	0.62
90–94	37 824	103 801	141 625	0.21
95–99	6 640	25 425	32 066	0.05
100+	719	4 219	4 938	0.01
Age group	Male	Female	Total	Percent
0–14	5 744 486	5 480 587	11 225 073	16.87
15–64	23 181 603	24 188 994	47 370 597	71.20
65+	3 202 156	4 736 858	7 939 014	11.93

== Vital statistics ==
=== Registered births and deaths ===
Although the UN classifies the birth and death registration of the National Statistics Office as incomplete the figures below clearly show the decreasing fertility in Thailand since the end of the 1950s. As of 2024 natural growth in Thailand is negative, which means that the number of deaths exceeds the number of births.

Year	Population	Live births	Deaths	Natural change	Crude birth rate (per 1000)	Crude death rate (per 1000)	Natural change (per 1000)	Crude migration change (per 1000)	Total Fertility Rate
1957	24,148,000	777,436	218,124	559,294	32.2	9.0	23.2		
1958	24,873,000	970,155	208,866	761,289	39.0	8.4	30.6	–1.50	
1959	25,619,000	801,380	206,129	595,254	31.3	8.0	23.3	6.06	
1960	26,388,000	915,538	221,853	693,685	34.7	8.4	26.3	2.94	
1961		813,805	210,709	603,096					
1962		973,634	221,157	752,477					
1963		1,020,051	233,192	786,859					
1964		1,119,715	231,095	888,620					
1965		1,117,698	216,830	900,868					
1966		1,085,594	236,243	849,351					
1967		1,116,424	230,622	855,802					
1968		1,200,131	232,116	968,015					
1969		1,133,526	243,444	890,082					
1970	39,100,000	1,145,293	223,899	921,394	29.3	5.7	23.6		
1971	39,760,000	1,221,228	227,990	993,238	30.7	5.7	25.0	−8.52	
1972	40,420,000	1,189,950	248,676	941,274	29.4	6.2	23.3	−7.07	
1973	41,080,000	1,167,272	293,151	874,121	28.4	7.1	21.3	−5.30	
1974	41,740,000	1,185,869	246,459	939,410	28.4	5.9	22.5	−6.80	
1975	42,400,000	1,132,416	234,550	897,866	26.7	5.5	21.2	−5.70	
1976	43,213,706	1,166,292	237,062	929,230	27.0	5.5	21.5	−2.74	4.15
1977	44,272,693	1,079,331	236,854	842,477	24.3	5.3	19.0	5.01	3.90
1978	45,221,625	1,040,218	241,146	799,072	23.0	5.3	17.7	3.38	3.66
1979	46,113,756	1,073,436	214,111	859,325	23.2	4.6	18.6	0.73	3.51
1980	46,961,338	1,077,300	247,970	729,320	22.9	5.3	17.6	−2.57	3.36
1981	47,875,002	1,062,238	239,423	822,815	22.2	5.0	17.2	1.94	3.18
1982	48,846,927	1,075,632	247,402	828,230	22.0	5.0	17.0	3.00	3.00
1983	49,515,074	1,055,802	252,592	803,210	21.3	5.1	16.2	−2.76	3.02
1984	50,583,105	956,680	225,282	731,398	19.0	4.5	14.5	6.80	2.70
1985	51,795,651	973,624	225,088	748,536	18.8	4.4	14.4	9.17	2.57
1986	52,969,204	945,827	218,025	727,802	18.0	4.1	13.9	8.61	2.45
1987	53,873,172	884,043	232,968	651,075	16.5	4.3	12.2	4.77	2.35
1988	54,960,917	873,842	231,227	642,615	16.0	4.2	11.8	8.26	2.26
1989	55,888,393	905,837	246,570	659,267	16.3	4.4	11.9	4.88	2.18
1990	56,303,273	956,237	252,512	703,725	17.0	4.5	12.5	−5.17	2.11
1991	56,961,030	960,556	264,350	696,206	17.0	4.7	12.3	−0.68	2.06
1992	57,788,965	964,557	275,313	689,244	16.8	4.8	12.0	2.43	1.98
1993	58,336,072	957,832	285,731	672,101	16.5	4.9	11.6	−2.16	1.89
1994	59,095,419	960,248	305,526	654,722	16.3	5.2	11.1	1.79	1.84
1995	59,460,382	963,678	324,842	638,836	16.2	5.5	10.7	−4.63	1.81
1996	60,116,182	983,395	315,467	667,928	16.3	5.2	11.1	−0.20	1.85
1997	60,816,227	880,028	279,090	600,938	14.5	4.6	9.9	1.65	1.69
1998	61,466,178	862,260	344,210	518,050	14.0	5.6	8.4	2.17	1.69
1999	61,661,701	774,349	315,550	458,799	12.5	5.1	7.4	−3.04	1.51
2000	61,878,746	773,009	365,741	407,268	12.5	5.9	6.6	−3.08	1.53
2001	62,308,887	790,425	369,493	420,932	12.7	6.0	6.7	0.15	1.54
2002	62,799,872	782,911	380,364	402,547	12.5	6.1	6.4	1.42	1.53
2003	63,079,765	742,183	384,131	358,052	11.8	6.1	5.7	−1.24	1.47
2004	61,973,621*	813,069	393,592	419,477	13.0	6.3	6.7		1.55
2005	62,418,054	809,485	395,374	414,111	13.0	6.4	6.6	0.49	1.55
2006	62,828,706	793,623	391,126	402,497	12.7	6.2	6.5	0.13	1.53
2007	63,038,247	797,588	393,255	404,333	12.7	6.3	6.4	−3.10	1.54
2008	63,389,730	784,256	397,326	386,930	12.4	6.3	6.1	−0.56	1.51
2009	63,525,062	765,047	393,916	371,131	12.1	6.2	5.9	−3.72	1.47
2010	63,878,267	761,689	411,331	350,358	12.0	6.5	5.5	0.04	1.49
2011	64,076,033	782,198	414,670	367,528	12.2	6.5	5.7	−2.66	1.55
2012	64,456,695	780,975	415,141	365,834	12.2	6.5	5.7	0.23	1.56
2013	64,785,909	748,081	426,065	322,016	11.6	6.6	5.0	0.11	1.46
2014	65,124,716	711,081	435,624	275,457	11.0	6.7	4.3	0.98	1.41
2015	65,729,098	679,502	445,964	233,538	10.4	6.9	3.5	5.69	1.45
2016	65,931,550	666,207	469,085	197,122	10.2	7.2	3.0	0.08	1.39
2017	66,188,503	656,570	458,010	198,560	10.1	7.0	3.1	0.89	1.38
2018	66,413,979	628,450	461,818	166,632	9.6	7.1	2.5	0.89	1.36
2019	66,558,935	596,736	494,339	102,397	9.1	7.5	1.6	0.64	1.25
2020	66,186,727	569,338	489,717	79,621	8.7	7.5	1.2	−6.79	1.18
2021	66,171,439	544,570	563,650	−19,080	8.1	8.4	−0.3	0.06	1.16
2022	66,090,475	502,107	595,965	−93,858	7.6	9.0	−1.4	0.19	1.07
2023	66,052,615	517,934	565,992	−48,058	7.8	8.5	−0.7	0.15	1.11
2024	65,951,210	462,240	571,646	−109,406	7.0	8.7	−1.7	0.12	0.98(e)
2025	65,809,011	416,574	559,684	−143,110	6.3	8.5	−2.2	−0.02	0.87
2026		365,294(e)							0.76 (e)

=== Current vital statistics ===
Period	Live births	Deaths	Natural increase
January—October 2025	348,686	462,448	−113,762
January—October 2026	304,798	466,622	−161,824
Difference	▼ −43,888 (−12.59%)	▲ +4,174 (+0.90%)	▼ −48,062

=== UN estimates ===
Statistics for births and deaths: all figures are per year
Period	Live births	Deaths	Natural change	CBR^{1}	CDR^{1}	NC^{1}	TFR^{1}	IMR^{1}
1950–1955	940 000	344 000	596 000	42.5	15.6	27.0	6.14	130.3
1955–1960	1 093 000	348 000	745 000	43.0	13.7	29.3	6.14	108.7
1960–1965	1 249 000	353 000	896 000	42.3	12.0	30.3	6.13	90.5
1965–1970	1 386 000	362 000	1 025 000	40.4	10.5	29.8	5.99	75.5
1970–1975	1 371 000	355 000	1 016 000	34.6	8.9	25.6	5.05	63.2
1975–1980	1 297 000	338 000	959 000	28.9	7.5	21.3	3.92	50.4
1980–1985	1 201 000	300 000	901 000	24.1	6.0	18.1	2.95	38.9
1985–1990	1 113 000	266 000	848 000	20.4	4.9	15.5	2.30	29.1
1990–1995	1 050 000	313 000	737 000	18.0	5.4	12.6	1.99	22.6
1995–2000	955 000	373 000	582 000	15.6	6.1	9.5	1.77	18.6
2000–2005				13.6	7.0	6.6	1.60	
2005–2010				12.3	7.2	5.1	1.56	
2010–2015				11.2	7.3	3.9	1.53	
2015–2020				10.5	7.6	2.9	1.53	
2020–2025				9.5	8.3	1.2	1.46	
2025–2030				8.9	9.1	−0.2	1.42	

^{1} CBR = crude birth rate (per 1000); CDR = crude death rate (per 1000); NC = natural change (per 1000); TFR = total fertility rate (number of children per woman); IMR = infant mortality rate per 1000 births. Sources:
Figures highlighted in yellow are projections.

=== Fertility rate ===
==== Ultra-low fertility ====
Thailand's population declined by 100,000 to 65.95 million in 2024. The historic demographic shift of 2024 occurred when the annual births fell below 500,000 for the first time since 1949. In 2024, 462,240 births versus 571,646 deaths were recorded. Thailand's total fertility rate (TFR) declined to 1.0, which is lower than Japan's 1.2. This makes Thailand an ultra-low fertility country like South Korea and Singapore. The Department of Provincial Administration reported that in 2025 Thailand had only 416,514 births (lowest in 75 years), while deaths reached 559,684. 2.1 children per woman is required to maintain a stable population.

==== Causes ====
The root cause of the declining birthrate and the rapid population aging is blamed on feelings of inadequate living standards, rising cost of living (housing, education, childrearing), not feeling successful enough compared to peers, societal pressures and unrealistic portrayals of success in social media. The public perception of starting a family is often burdensome, stressful, or overly expensive. Ineffective policies will result in a demographic crisis. Within circa 50 years, the population is projected to decline from over 60 million to just over 30 million. This will negatively affect Thailand's national competitiveness, international bargaining power, and national security.

==== Projections ====
Demographic projections predict that the population could shrink to 40 million people in 50 years. This would be a decrease of 25 million or 1 million people per 2 years. A survey with over 1,000 Thais showed that 71% regard the low birthrate as a national crisis, while only 35.8% of fertile people plan to have children. The government's "Having Children for the Nation" campaign proves to be ineffective. 2025 predictions are a shrink to 30 million from around 67 million in 50 to 60 years.

==== Policies ====
The director-general of the Department of Health, Dr Amporn Benjapolpitak, outlined the "Every Birth Matters" policy of the Ministry of Public Health in April 2026. Five key achievements are:

- Expanding fertility and preconception services
- Strengthening maternal and child healthcare through a continuous care model
- Investing in early childhood development under the "Amazing 2,500 Days" framework
- Preventing unintended pregnancies
- Promoting mental health support for mothers and families.

There are 3 forward-looking strategies:

- Reducing healthcare burdens on parents
- Expanding digital access to maternal and child health services
- Harnessing big data analytics to provide more tailored, family-level policy support.

==== Total fertility rate by province ====
Total fertility rate (TFR) in Thailand by province as of 2020-2022:

Province	TFR
Bangkok	0.67
Nonthaburi	0.80
Pathum Thani	0.83
Samut Prakan	0.85
Chonburi	0.89
Phuket	0.92
Samut Sakhon	0.92
Samut Songkhram	0.93
Chachoengsao	0.94
Nakhon Pathom	0.97
Chiang Mai	1.00
Nakhon Nayok	1.01
Phra Nakhon Si Ayutthaya	1.02
Phang Nga	1.05
Sing Buri	1.06
Ang Thong	1.08
Saraburi	1.09
Chanthaburi	1.09
Lamphun	1.09
Prachuap Khiri Khan	1.09
Phetchaburi	1.10
Krabi	1.10
Songkhla	1.10
Trat	1.11
Ranong	1.11
Lopburi	1.12
Prachinburi	1.12
Lampang	1.12
Surat Thani	1.12
Trang	1.13
Chai Nat	1.14
Ratchaburi	1.14
Chumphon	1.14
Chiang Rai	1.15
Suphan Buri	1.16
Phatthalung	1.17
Sa Kaeo	1.17
Phitsanulok	1.18
Phrae	1.18
Kanchanaburi	1.18
Nakhon Ratchasima	1.18
Uttaradit	1.19
Phichit	1.20
Uthai Thani	1.20
Nakhon Si Thammarat	1.20
Phayao	1.21
Phetchabun	1.21
Khon Kaen	1.22
Nan	1.22
Kamphaeng Phet	1.22
Sukhothai	1.23
Nong Khai	1.24
Satun	1.24
Tak	1.25
Udon Thani	1.26
Nakhon Sawan	1.27
Mukdahan	1.28
Loei	1.29
Ubon Ratchathani	1.29
Nakhon Phanom	1.31
Chaiyaphum	1.31
Sakon Nakhon	1.33
Buriram	1.33
Amnat Charoen	1.34
Maha Sarakham	1.36
Sisaket	1.36
Surin	1.38
Nong Bua Lamphu	1.38
Kalasin	1.39
Roi Et	1.41
Yasothon	1.45
Mae Hong Son	1.50
Narathiwat	1.85
Yala	1.98
Pattani	2.00

==== Total fertility rate before 1950 ====
Years	1925	1926	1927	1928	1929	1930	1931	1932	1933	1934
Total Fertility Rate in Thailand	6.35	6.34	6.33	6.32	6.32	6.31	6.30	6.29	6.28	6.27

Years	1935	1936	1937	1938	1939	1940	1941	1942	1943	1944
Total Fertility Rate in Thailand	6.26	6.25	6.25	6.24	6.23	6.22	6.21	6.20	6.19	6.18

Years	1945	1946	1947	1948	1949
Total Fertility Rate in Thailand	6.18	6.17	6.16	6.15	6.14

=== Life expectancy at birth ===
Life expectancy in Thailand since 1937

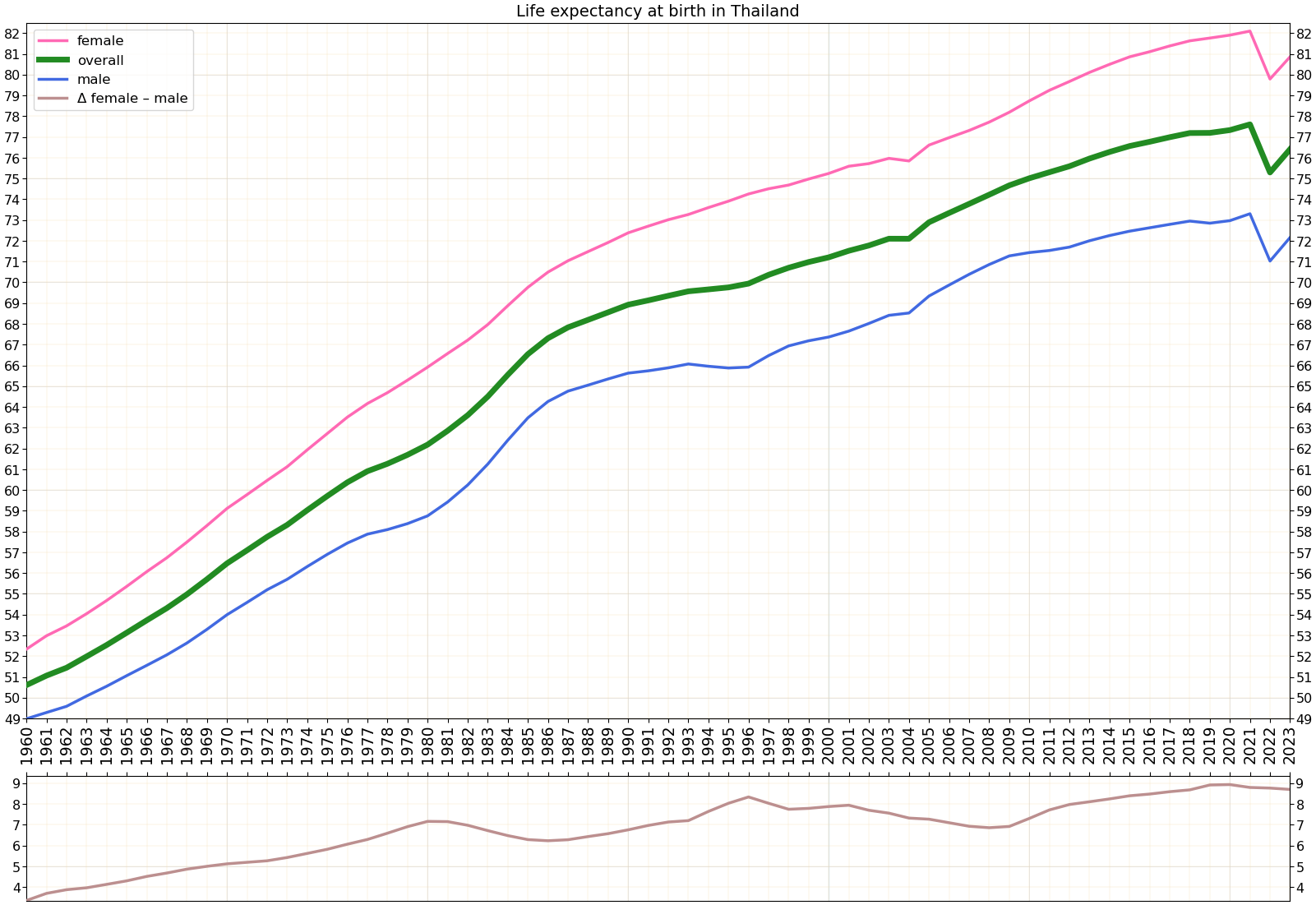
Life expectancy in Thailand since 1960 by gender

Average life expectancy at birth of the total population.

Period	Life expectancy (years)	Period	Life expectancy (years)
1950–1955	50.8	1985–1990	69.8
1955–1960	53.3	1990–1995	70.2
1960–1965	56.1	1995–2000	70.3
1965–1970	58.2	2000–2005	71.2
1970–1975	60.7	2005–2010	73.2
1975–1980	63.3	2010–2015	75.2
1980–1985	65.8	2015–2020	76.8

=== Marriages and divorce ===
In 2024, the marriage registry had 263,087 new couples, while 147,621 couples divorced.

=== Demographic and Health Surveys ===
Total fertility rate (TFR) in Thailand by region and year:

Region	2005–06	1995–96	1985–86
Thailand (total)	1.471	2.022	2.730
Urban	1.033	1.332	1.766
Rural	1.727	2.285	2.962
Bangkok Metropolis	0.878	1.261	1.735
Central Region	1.190	1.664	2.494
Northern Region	1.575	1.894	2.248
Northeastern Region	2.038	2.435	3.096
Southern Region	1.524	2.851	4.049

== Ethnic groups ==
Ethnological map of Thailand, 1974

Thailand's ethnic origins are diverse and continue to evolve. The nation's ethnic makeup is obscured by the pressures of Thaification, Thai nationalism, and social pressure, which is intertwined with a caste-like mentality assigning some groups higher social status than others. In its report to the United Nations for the International Convention on the Elimination of All Forms of Racial Discrimination, the Thai government officially recognized 62 ethnic communities. Twenty million Central Thai (together with approximately 650,000 Khorat Thai) make up approximately 20,650,000 million (34.1 percent) of the nation's population of 60,544,937 at the time of completion of the Mahidol University Ethnolinguistic Maps of Thailand data (1997).

Thailand's report to the UN provided population numbers for mountain peoples and ethnic communities in the northeast. Thus, though over 3.288 million people in the northeast alone could not be categorised, the population and percentages of other ethnic communities c. 1997 are known and constitute minimum populations. In descending order, the largest (equal to or greater than 400,000) are:

1. Lao (15,080,000, 24.9%) consisting of the Thai Lao (14 million) and other smaller Lao groups, namely the Thai Loei (400–500,000), Lao Lom (350,000), Lao Wiang/Klang (200,000), Lao Khrang (90,000), Lao Ngaew (30,000), and Lao Ti (10,000)
2. 6 million Khon Muang (9.9%, also called Northern Thais)
3. 4.5 million Pak Tai (7.5%, also called Southern Thais)
4. 1.4 million Khmer Leu (2.3%, also called Northern Khmer)
5. 900,000 Malay (1.5%)
6. 500,000 Nyaw (0.8%)
7. 470,000 Phu Thai (0.8%)
8. 400,000 Kuy/Kuay (also known as Suay) (0.7%)
9. 350,000 Karen (0.6%).

Thailand's Ministry of Social Development and Human Security's 2015 Master Plan for the Development of Ethnic Groups in Thailand 2015–2017 omitted the larger, ethnoregional ethnic communities, including the Central Thai majority; it therefore covers only 9.7% of the population.

There is a significant number of Thai-Chinese in Thailand. However, Chinese origins as evidenced by surname were erased in the 1920s by royal decree, about one-sixth of Thais may have Chinese origins. One scholar estimated that the Sino-Thai population, itself around 14 per cent of the total, was composed of around 56 percent Teochew, 16 percent Hakka, 12 percent Hainanese, 7 percent Hokkien, 7 percent Cantonese and 2 percent other. Significant intermixing has taken place such that there are few pure ethnic Chinese, and those of partially mixed Chinese ancestry account for as much as a third to a half of the Thai population. Those assigned Thai ethnicity in the census process made up the vast majority of the population in 2010 (95.9 percent); two percent were Burmese, 1.3 percent other, and 0.9 percent unspecified. Thus, the ethnosocial and genetic makeup situation is very different from that which is reported or self-claimed.

The vast majority of the Isan people, one-third of Thailand's population, are of ethnic Lao with some belonging to the Khmer minority. They speak the Isan language. Additionally there have been more recent waves of immigration from Vietnam and Cambodia across porous borders due to wars and subsequent poverty over the last few decades, whose immigrants have tried to keep a low profile and blend in.

In more recent years the Isan people began mixing with the rest of the nation as urbanization and mobility increase. Myanmar's numerous ethnic wars between the army and tribes who speak more than 40 languages and control large fiefdoms or states, has led to waves of immigrants seeking refuge or work in Thailand. The makeup of Myanmar nationals is complex and includes, for example, people of Nepali ethnicity who escaped Nepal, entered Myanmar, and then emigrated to Thailand.

Following the 2014 Thai coup d'état, Thailand's Department of Employment released figures showing that 408,507 legal workers from Myanmar, Laos, and Cambodia worked in Thailand. An additional 1,630,279 Myanmar nationals of all ethnicities, 40,546 Laotians, and 153,683 Cambodians were without legal work authorization, but also worked and resided in Thailand. Some 180,000 Cambodians were said to have left Thailand post-coup due to crackdown rumors, indicating government figures were an under count. These statistics are merely a single snapshot and hardly authoritative as there is constant movement and much eluding of authority.

The language of the central Thai population is the educational and administrative language. Other dialects of Thai exist, most notably the Southern Thai language. Several other small Tai (not Thai) groups include the Shan, Lue, and Phu Thai.

Malay- and Yawi-speaking Muslims of the south are another significant minority group (2.3 percent), yet there are a substantial number of ethnic Malays who speak only Thai. Other groups include the Khmer; the Mon, who are substantially assimilated with the Thai, and the Vietnamese.

Smaller mountain-dwelling tribes, such as the Hmong and Mien, as well as the Karen, number about 788,024. Some 300,000 Hmong were to have received citizenship in 2010.

Thailand is also home to more than 200,000 foreigners—retirees, extended tourists, and workers from, for example, Europe, North America, and elsewhere.

== Languages ==
Thailand is dominated by languages of the Southwestern Tai family. Karen languages are spoken along the border with Burma, Khmer is spoken near Cambodia (and previously throughout central Thailand), and Malay in the south near Malaysia.

The Thai hill tribes speak numerous small languages, many Chinese retain varieties of Chinese, and there are half a dozen sign languages. Thailand has 73 living languages.

The following table shows first languages in Thailand with 400,000 or more speakers according to the Royal Thai Government's 2011 Country Report to the Committee Responsible for the International Convention on the Elimination of All Forms of Racial Discrimination.

Official first languages of Thailand with 400,000 or more speakers
Language	Speakers	Language Family
Central Thai	20.0 million	Tai-Kadai
Lao	15.2 million	Tai-Kadai
Kam Mueang	6.0 million	Tai-Kadai
Pak Tai	4.5 million	Tai-Kadai
Northern Khmer	1.4 million	Austroasiatic
Yawi	1.4 million	Austronesian
Ngaw (Nyaw)	0.5 million	Tai-Kadai
Phu Thai	0.5 million	Tai-Kadai
Karen	0.4 million	Sino-Tibetan
Kuy	0.4 million	Austroasiatic

The following table employs 2010 census data. Caution should be exercised with Thai census data on first language. In Thai censuses, the four largest Tai-Kadai languages of Thailand (in order, Central Thai, Isan (majority Lao), Kam Mueang, Pak Tai) are not provided as options for language or ethnic group. People declaring one of these as a first language, including Lao, are assigned to "Thai". This explains the disparity between the two tables. For instance, self-reporting as Lao has been prohibited, due to the prohibition of the Lao ethnonym in the context of describing Thai citizens for approximately one hundred years. This was due to the promotion of "Thai" national identity to cement Siamese claims over the Lao city-states of what is now northern and northeast Thailand following the 1893 Franco-Siamese crisis and subsequent threats posed by French Indochina to the Lao tributary states of Siam. The birth of a homogenizing Thai ethnocentric national identity sufficient to begin transforming Siam from an absolute monarchy into a modern nation-state was achieved by assimilating the Lao with this Thai "identity", equivalent to what is now known as the Tai–Kadai languages, under a "Greater Thai Empire", and can be traced back to at least 1902. This homogenization began affecting the Thai census from 1904 onwards. The 2011 UN report data is therefore more comprehensive and better differentiates between the large Tai-Kadai languages of Thailand. As a country submission to a UN convention ratified by Thailand, it is also arguably more authoritative.

Population of Thailand above the age of 5 by language (UN statistics 2010)
Language	Language family	No. of speakers
Thai	Tai-Kadai	59,866,190
Burmese	Sino-Tibetan	827,713
Tai	Tai-Kadai	787,696
Karen	Sino-Tibetan	441,114
English	Indo-European	323,779
Chinese	Sino-Tibetan	111,866
Japanese	Japonic	70,677
Hindi	Indo-European	22,938
Vietnamese	Austroasiatic	8,281
Malay	Austronesian	2,913
Others		3,518,502
Total		65,981,659

== Religion ==
Theravada Buddhism is the official religion of Thailand. 93.5 percent are estimated to be Buddhist; 5.4 percent Muslim; 1.1 percent Christian; and 0.1 percent other or have no religion.

In addition to Malay and Yawi speaking Thai and other southerners who are Muslim, the Muslim Cham of Cambodia in recent years began a large scale influx into Thailand. The government permits religious diversity, and other major religions are represented, though there is much social tension, especially in the Muslim south. Spirit worship and animism are widely practiced.

== Migration ==
=== Immigration ===
The largest foreign community are the Burmese, followed by the Cambodians and Laotians.

As of March 2018, Thai government data showed that over 770,900 Cambodian migrants, meaning five percent of the total population of Cambodia, currently live in Thailand. Some NGOs estimate that the actual number may be up to one million.

Laotians are particularly numerous considering the small size of Laos' population, about seven million, due to the lack of a language barrier. The Chinese expatriate employee population in Thailand, mostly Bangkok, has doubled from 2011 to 2016, making it the largest foreign community in Thailand not originating in a neighbouring country. Chinese hold 13.3 percent of all work permits issued in Thailand, an increase of almost one-fifth since 2015. Japanese expats are on the decline, and now rank sixth, behind Chinese and British. One in every four foreigners working in Thailand formerly were Japanese, and the figure has now dropped slightly to 22.8 percent of the foreign workforce as of late 2016.

Foreign residents in Thailand, according to the 2010 Census. It was found that there were 2,581,141 of foreign origins, composing around 3.87 percent of Thailand's population. Migrants from Cambodia, Laos and Myanmar, the most prevalent, accounted for 1.8 million foreigners.

Research by Kasikorn Bank estimated that in 2016, there were 68,300 foreigners over 50 years old—the minimum age for a retirement visa—holding long-stay visas living in Thailand, a 9% increase over the preceding two years. In 2018, Thailand issued almost 80,000 retirement visas, an increase of 30% from 2014, with Britons accounting for the majority of the new visas.

In 2010 there were 27,357 Westerners living in the northeastern region, 90 percent living with Thai spouses, according to research by the College of Population Studies at Chulalongkorn University in 2017.

As of 2016, up to 145,000 Taiwanese expatriates live in Thailand.

Updated in 2025, there some expats that decrease from 2010 as well as some of them have been increase. For instance, Myanmar, Cambodia and Laos have been increase so much from 2010. The decline of Brits and Japanese from 2010. Rise of German and French slightly from 2010.

Also reported from news said that there are estimated 30,000 Israeli arrived and settle in Thailand

Foreign residents by country of origin 2025
Myanmar	4,000,000	50.08%
Cambodia	1,100,000	10.90%
Laos	700,000	8.62%
China	400,000-600,000	5.48%
Vietnam	500,000	3.33%
India	150,000	0.5%
Taiwan	145,000	1.80%
Nepal	20,000	1.56%
Russia	60,000-100,000	1.34%
Japan	78,000	0.94%
United States	60,000	0.87%
United Kingdom	41,000	0.68%
France	40,000	0.68%
Bangladesh	36,000	0.32%
Germany	35,000	0.11%
Pakistan	32,000	0.11%
Israel	30,000	0.9%
Philippines	30,000	0.9%
South Korea	30,000	0.9%
Australia	20,000	0.8%
Malaysia	16,000	0.8%
Sweden	15,000	0.8%
Switzerland	10,400	0.7%
Italy	10,000	0.7%
Netherlands	10,000	0.7%
Norway	9,000	0.6%
Others	174,236	6.75%
Stateless	117,315	4.54%
Unknown	2,147	0.08%
Total population	2,581,141	100.00%

Foreign Expats by regions 2010
Region	Population	Percentage
Southeast Asia	1,845,788	71.51%
East Asia	249,204	9.65%
Europe	200,564	7.77%
South Asia	78,454	3.04%
Northern America	46,279	1.79%
Australia and Oceania	13,233	0.51%
Central and South America	10,608	0.41%
Africa	8,166	0.32%
West Asia	6,634	0.26%
Central Asia	2,749	0.11%
Stateless	117,315	4.54%
Unknown	2,147	0.08%
Total population	2,581,141	100.00%
