= Sao Saw Et =

2009 anti-LGBTQ incident in Thailand

- Part of LGBT history in Thailand
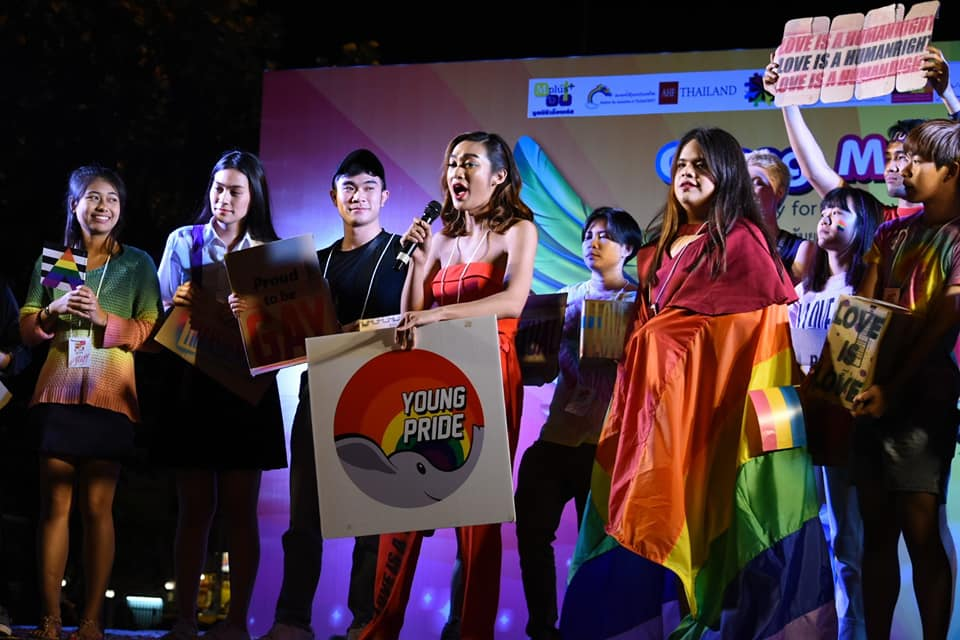
- 10-year commemorative event in 2019
- Date: 21 February 2009
- Location: Phutthasathan Chiang Mai and Wat Uppakhut, Mueang District, Chiang Mai Province, Thailand; 18.7876689°N 99.0019783°E
- Goals: Cancellation of Chiang Mai Pride Parade
- Methods: Blockade, hate speech, curses, throwing things

Parties
| Rak Chiang Mai 51 Group and anti-parade groups | 22 organisations organising the parade |

Number
| 1,000 | Unknown |

Sao Saw Et (Thai: เสาร์ซาวเอ็ด, lit: Saturday the 21st, in Northern Thai) was an incident of discrimination against LGBT people in Chiang Mai, Thailand, consisting of hate speech and violent attempts to stop the 2009 Pride Parade which was scheduled to take place there on 21 February 2009, ultimately leading to its cancellation. It is considered an important event in Thai LGBT history and was compared to the Stonewall Riots in the US. The date, 21 February, has been annually observed as the day against violence against LGBT in Thailand amongst activists.

== Incidents ==
The Chiang Mai Gay Parade was initially organised by 22 LGBT organisations with the scheduled date of 21 February 2009. The parade would start from The Buddhist monastery Phutthasathan Chiang Mai and the nearby Wat Uppakhut and march along the Chang Khlan Road through the Chiang Mai Night Bazaar, starting from 18.00.

However, after the event was announced, various groups of people including several LGBT activists leading by Nathee Theerarotchanaphong; a Thai conservative LGBT and political activist, began to call for the local government agencies to step in for cancellation of the event. Among the reasons given for the parade to be cancelled were that would "destroy the beautiful Lanna culture" or “cause the youth to imitate the [LGBT] behaviour". Local government officials, including the province governor and the head of cultural division, were inclined towards cancellation. Moreover, local news agencies and radio stations at the time were reported to spread hate speech towards the LGBT participants and even incited the crowd to throw things and block the parade route.

On the scheduled date, 21 February 2009, the parade organisers and participants gathered inside of the Phutthasathan Chiang Mai Monastery to prepare the parade. Around 16.00, a politically-inclined Red Shirt group called the Rak Chiang Mai 51 Group, armed, gathered around the gate of the monastery, constraining the parade participants inside. The armed group, which reportedly consisted of a thousand people, put up banners and used speakers to curse at participants trapped inside the blockade. Some parade organisers were reportedly injured from stone-throwers. A troop of 100 police officers later arrived at the scene, doing nothing to stop the ongoing violence. The officers, indeed, called for the parade organisers to cancel the parade and apologise to the infuriated crowd. The parade organisers finally apologised to the armed crowd and canceled the parade after four hours of aggression, for the sake of the intimidated parade participants.

The calls for the parade cancellation varied from the milder stance of allowing the parade to be held but with the term "gay" removed from the event’s name, to more aggressive ones like prohibiting such events from being held in Chiang Mai for another 1,500 years.

== Aftermath ==
A group called Sao Saw Et was formed in order to educate people on peaceful living with LGBT people and eliminating violence against LGBT people. Chiang Mai did not have another pride parade until 2019, which had the same route and a vigil to remember the 2009 incident.
