= Tunyawaj Kamolwongwat =

Thai politician and activist

- ธัญวัจน์ กมลวงศ์วัฒน์

Member of the House of Representatives
- Incumbent
- Assumed office 24 March 2019

Personal details
- Political party: People's Party

Tunyawaj Kamolwongwat (Thai: ธัญวัจน์ กมลวงศ์วัฒน์; RTGS: Thanyawat Kamonwongwat) is a Thai politician and LGBT activist, serving as a Member of Parliament since 2019. He is a member of the People's Party.

== Career ==
On 18 June 2020, Tunyawaj introduced the first draft of the Marriage Equality Act to legalize same-sex marriage, which was passed in 2024. The bill proposed to amend the civil code with gender-neutral terms.

In early 2024, Tunyawaj introduced the first draft of the Gender Recognition Bill. The draft was rejected 257 to 154 on 21 February 2024.

Following the enactment of the Marriage Equality Act in January 2025, Tunyawaj proposed four areas of reforms to increase social equality, including awareness of gender diversity, sexual offenses, reproductive technology, and gender recognition.
