= Ann Chumaporn =

Thai LGBTQ activist

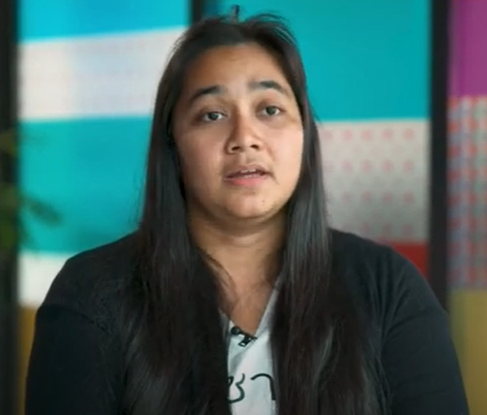
- Chumaporn in 2020
- Born: Chumaporn Taengkliang
- Other name: Waaddao
- Citizenship: Thailand
- Known for: LGBT rights activism founding Naruemit Pride

Chumaporn Taengkliang (Thai: ชุมาพร แต่งเกลี้ยง, RTGS: Chumaphon Taengkliang), also known as Ann "Waaddao" Chumaporn (อรรณว์ (วาดดาว)) is a Thai LGBTQ rights activist and founder of Naruemit Pride, the organizer of Bangkok Pride.

From Nakhon Sri Thammarat Province, Chumaporn co-founded Togetherness for Equality Action (TEA), a women-led NGO, and co-founded Women for Freedom and Democracy.

Chumaporn founded Nauremit Pride in 2022, and has organized subsequent pride events in Bangkok. She served as spokesperson of the parliamentary committee for the Marriage Equality Act. Following the legalization of same-sex marriage in Thailand, Chumaporn plans to hold a mass wedding for over 1,000 LGBT couples on 23 January 2025.

== Awards ==
In December 2024, Ann Chumaporn was included on the BBC's 100 Women list.

== See also ==
- Bangkok Pride
- LGBT rights in Thailand
- Same-sex marriage in Thailand
