= Wantanee Wattana =

Thai physician and civil servant

- วันทนีย์ วัฒนะ

Permanent Secretary of the Bangkok Metropolitan Administration
- Incumbent
- Assumed office 1 October 2023
- Governor: Chadchart Sittipunt

Deputy Permanent Secretary of the Bangkok Metropolitan Administration
- In office 5 November 2015 – 1 October 2023
- Governor: Sukhumbhand Paribatra; Aswin Kwanmuang; Chadchart Sittipunt

Personal details
- Education: Chiang Mai University (MBBS); Chulalongkorn University (MS)

Wantanee Wattana (Thai: วันทนีย์ วัฒนะ, RTGS: Wanthani Watthana) is a Thai physician and civil servant, serving as Permanent Secretary of the Bangkok Metropolitan Administration (BMA) since 2023. She previously served as the deputy permanent secretary of the BMA from 2015 to 2023.

== Education ==
Wantanee graduated from Chiang Mai University with a bachelor of medicine in 1989. She later received a master of science in community medicine from Chulalongkorn University in 1992.

== Career ==
Wantanee was appointed permanent secretary by royal command on 19 December 2023, retroactive to 1 October 2023.

Wantanee oversaw management of the COVID-19 pandemic in Bangkok.

Wantanee oversaw preparations in Bangkok's 50 district offices for the 23 January 2025 legalization of same-sex marriage in Thailand.
