= Same-sex marriage in Thailand =

Same-sex marriage has been legal in Thailand since 23 January 2025. The Marriage Equality Act, supported by the government of Prime Minister Srettha Thavisin and major opposition parties, was introduced to the National Assembly in November 2023. It was passed by the House of Representatives by 400 votes to 10 on 27 March 2024, and by the Senate in a vote of 130 to 4 on 18 June. The law received royal assent from King Vajiralongkorn on 12 August, and was published in the Royal Gazette on 24 September 2024. It took effect on 23 January 2025, 120 days after promulgation.

Thailand previously did not recognise any form of same-sex unions. The law replaced the terms "men and women" and "husband and wife" in the Civil and Commercial Code with the words "individuals" and "spouses", and allows same-sex couples to jointly adopt children. Previously, bills for civil partnerships and same-sex marriage had been introduced to Parliament several times, but had failed to pass. Thailand was the first country in Southeast Asia, the second in Asia after Taiwan and the 38th in the world to legalise same-sex marriage. Polling suggests that a significant majority of Thai people support the legal recognition of same-sex marriage.

== Civil partnerships ==
In December 2012, the government of Prime Minister Yingluck Shinawatra formed a committee to draft legislation providing legal recognition to same-sex couples in the form of civil partnerships. On 8 February 2013, the Rights and Liberties Protection Department and the Parliament's Committee on Legal Affairs, Justice, and Human Rights held a public hearing on the civil partnership bill, drafted by the committee's chairman, Viroon Phuensaen. By 2014, the bill had bipartisan support, but was stalled due to political unrest in the country. In the second half of 2014, media reported that a draft bill called the Civil Partnership Act (Thai: พระราชบัญญัติคู่ชีวิต, Phraratchabanyat Khuchiwit) would be submitted to the junta-appointed Thai Parliament. It would have granted same-sex couples some of the rights of opposite-sex marriage, but was criticized for increasing the minimum age from 17 to 20, and omitting adoption rights.

In 2017, government officials responded favourably to a petition signed by 60,000 people calling for the legalisation of same-sex civil partnerships. Pitikan Sithidej, the director-general of the Rights and Liberties Protection Department, confirmed that she had received the petition and "would do all she could" to get it passed as soon as possible. The Ministry of Justice convened on 4 May 2018 to begin discussions on a draft civil partnership bill, titled the Same Sex Life Partnership Registration Bill. Under the proposal, same-sex couples would have been able to register as "life partners" and would have been granted some of the rights of marriage. The bill was discussed in public hearings between 12 and 16 November, where a reported 98 percent of respondents expressed support for the measure. The government approved the bill on 25 December 2018. On 8 July 2020, the new government formed following the 2019 election approved a new draft of the bill and introduced it to the National Assembly. However, it did not pass before the end of the year.

On 14 February 2023, Bangkok's Dusit district became the first jurisdiction in Thailand to issue partnership certificates (Thai: ใบรับการแจ้งชีวิตคู่, bairap kan chaeng chiwit khu) to same-sex couples. The certificates are not legally binding but can serve as evidence-based documentation of a relationship. The district also announced it would use the certificates to roughly estimate the number of same-sex couples wishing to marry.

== Same-sex marriage ==
Laws regarding homosexuality in Asia Same-sex sexual activity legal Marriage performed Marriage recognized Other type of partnership Unregistered cohabitation No recognition of same-sex couples Restricted or ambiguous Restriction on freedom of expression, not enforced Severe restriction of association with arrests or detention Same-sex sexual activity illegal Prison, not enforced Prison Death penalty on books, not enforced Enforced death penalty

=== Background and Constitutional Court ruling ===
In May 1928, Thai media reported the story of a marriage between two women in Bangkok. One of the spouses was shot dead a month later.

In September 2011, the National Human Rights Commission (NHRC) and the Sexual Diversity Network proposed draft legislation on same-sex marriage and called on the Thai Government to support its legalisation. In September 2013, the Bangkok Post reported that an attempt in 2011 by Natee Teerarojjanapong, the president of the Gay Political Group of Thailand, to register a marriage with his male partner had been rejected. Several other couples made similar attempts over the following years.

In 2021, the Constitutional Court ruled that section 1448 of the Civil and Commercial Code defining marriages as only being between "men and women" was constitutional. The court stated that same-sex couples "cannot reproduce, as it is against nature, and that people of those communities are no different to other animals with strange behaviours or physical features". The verdict cited LGBT people as a different "species" that needed to be "separated and studied as they are incapable of creating the delicate bond of human relationships". The text was criticised by LGBT activists as "sexist and demeaning". The court ruling stated:

Marriage is when a man and a woman are willing to live together, to build a husband and wife relationship to reproduce their offspring, under the morals, traditions, religion and the laws of each society. Marriage is, therefore, reserved for only a man and a woman.

=== Marriage Equality Act ===
In June 2020, Deputy Tunyawat Kamolwongwat from the Move Forward Party introduced a bill to legalise same-sex marriage to the National Assembly. A public consultation on the bill was launched on 2 July 2020. In June 2022, a couple of same-sex union bills passed their first readings in Parliament. These included the Marriage Equality Bill proposed by the opposition Move Forward Party, which would have amended the Civil and Commercial Code and opened marriage to couples of any gender, and a government-proposed civil partnership bill, which would have instead introduced civil partnerships as a separate category, granting some, but not all, of the rights given to married couples. Despite several amendments, neither bill passed Parliament before it was dissolved ahead of the 2023 election.

In November 2023, Prime Minister Srettha Thavisin of the Pheu Thai Party announced that his government had approved a draft same-sex marriage law, which Parliament began to debate on 21 December 2023. Three versions proposed by the Move Forward Party and the Democrat Party were also considered. All four bills passed overwhelmingly by 369 votes to 10 on 21 December 2023, and the House of Representatives approved the formation of an ad-hoc committee to combine the four draft bills into one over 15 days, before further debates in 2024. On 27 March 2024, the House of Representatives overwhelmingly approved a unified draft law by 400 votes to 10 in third reading, with two abstentions and three not voting. The bill passed its first reading in the Senate on 2 April by a 147 to 4 vote. On 29 May, the chair of the ad-hoc committee said that the Senate was expected to vote on the bill on 18 June. That day, the bill was approved by the Senate in its final reading without amendments. It received royal assent from King Vajiralongkorn on 12 August, and was published in the Royal Gazette on 24 September 2024. The law came into effect on 23 January 2025. Prime Minister Paetongtarn Shinawatra welcomed the promulgation on social media. The enactment of the Marriage Equality Act (Thai: พระราชบัญญัติสมรสเท่าเทียม, Phraratchabanyat Somrot Thaothiam, pronounced [pʰrárâːttɕʰábānjàt sǒmrót tʰâwtʰīa̯m]) made Thailand the first country in Southeast Asia and the second in Asia after Taiwan to legalise same-sex marriage. Article 1,448 of the Civil and Commercial Code now reads:

Marriage can be conducted only when both parties have completed their eighteenth year of age. But the Court may, in case of having appropriate reason, allow them to marry before attaining such age. (Note: Thai: การสมรสจะกระทำได้ต่อเมื่อบุคคลทั้งสองฝ่ายมีอายุสิบแปดปีบริบูรณ์แล้ว แต่ในกรณีมีเหตุอันสมควร ศาลอาจอนุญาตให้ทำการสมรสก่อนนั้นได้)

Ahead of the law's implementation, Bangkok Pride leader Ann Chumaporn stated that the organisation would work with the Bangkok Metropolitan Administration to organise a mass wedding ceremony on 23 January 2025, with the goal of having 1,448 same-sex couples participate, symbolising the Civil and Commercial Code section amended by the Marriage Equality Act. Activists also urged communities in other provinces to organize similar mass wedding ceremonies. Prime Minister Shinawatra invited several same-sex couples to the Government House to celebrate their marriages, writing on Instagram: "January 23, 2025 will be the day we all make history together, the love of everyone is legally recognised with honour and dignity." According to the Ministry of Interior, more than 1,754 same-sex couples married on the first day of legalization, with about 650 in Bangkok. On 19 May 2025, King Vajiralongkorn and Queen Suthida officiated at the first-ever royally-sponsored wedding ceremony of a same-sex couple. Previously, they had presented a bouquet and gifts to the couple in celebration of their marriage registration on 1 February 2025.

=== Statistics ===
By January 2026, 26,287 same-sex couples had married in Thailand, accounting for about 10% of all marriages. 24% of same-sex marriages were between male couples, while the remaining 76% were between lesbian couples.

== Public opinion ==
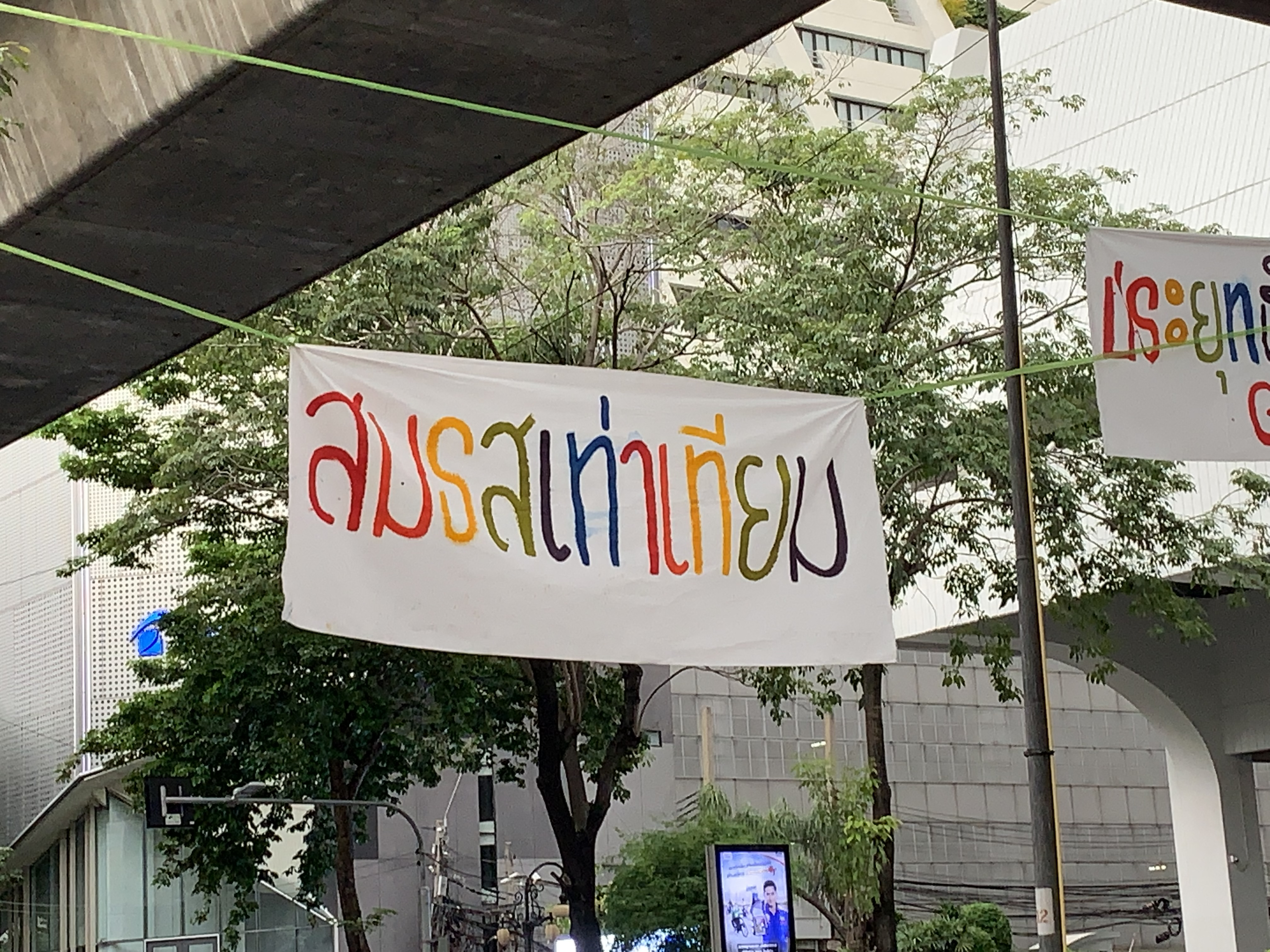
A sign reading "สมรสเท่าเทียม" (somrot thaothiam; Thai for "equal marriage"), a recurring slogan calling for the legalisation of same-sex marriage, Bangkok, 2022

Thai opinion polls have consistently favoured legal recognition of same-sex marriages. According to a 2019 YouGov poll of 1,025 respondents, 63% of Thai people supported the legalisation of same-sex partnerships, with 11% against and 27% preferring not to answer. Support varied with age: legalisation was supported by 69% of people aged 18 to 34 (10% opposed), 56% of those aged 35 to 54 (33% opposed), and 55% of those aged 55 and over (13% opposed). Among respondents with university degrees, 66% were in favour (10% opposed), compared to 57% of those without university degrees (12% opposed). Support was also higher among those with high incomes, at 68% (7% opposed), compared to 55% among those with low incomes (13% opposed). Finally, 68% of women expressed support (7% opposed), as did 57% of men (14% opposed).

According to a 2022 poll by the National Institute of Development Administration (NIDA), 80% of Thais supported same-sex marriage. A June–September 2022 Pew Research Center poll showed that 60% of Thai people supported same-sex marriage (24% "strongly" and 36% "somewhat"), while 32% opposed (18% "strongly" and 14% "somewhat"). Support was highest among Buddhists at 68%, but lowest among Muslims at 14%. This level of support was the second highest among the six Southeast Asian countries polled, behind Vietnam at 65%, but ahead of Cambodia at 57%, Singapore at 45%, Malaysia at 17%, and Indonesia at 5%. A government survey conducted between 31 October and 14 November 2023 showed that 96.6% of the Thai public supported the same-sex marriage bill. Opposition to same-sex marriage was mainly concentrated among Thailand's small Muslim minority.

== See also ==
- LGBTQ rights in Thailand
- Recognition of same-sex unions in Asia
