= Marriage Equality Act (Thailand) =

Act of the parliament of Thailand

House of Representatives
- Long title: Civil and Commercial Code Amendment Act (No 24), 2567 BE
- Territorial extent: Thailand
- Passed by: House of Representatives
- Passed: 27 March 2024
- Passed by: Senate
- Passed: 18 June 2024
- Assented to by: King Vajiralongkorn
- Royal assent: 12 August 2024
- Commenced: 23 January 2025
- Status: In force

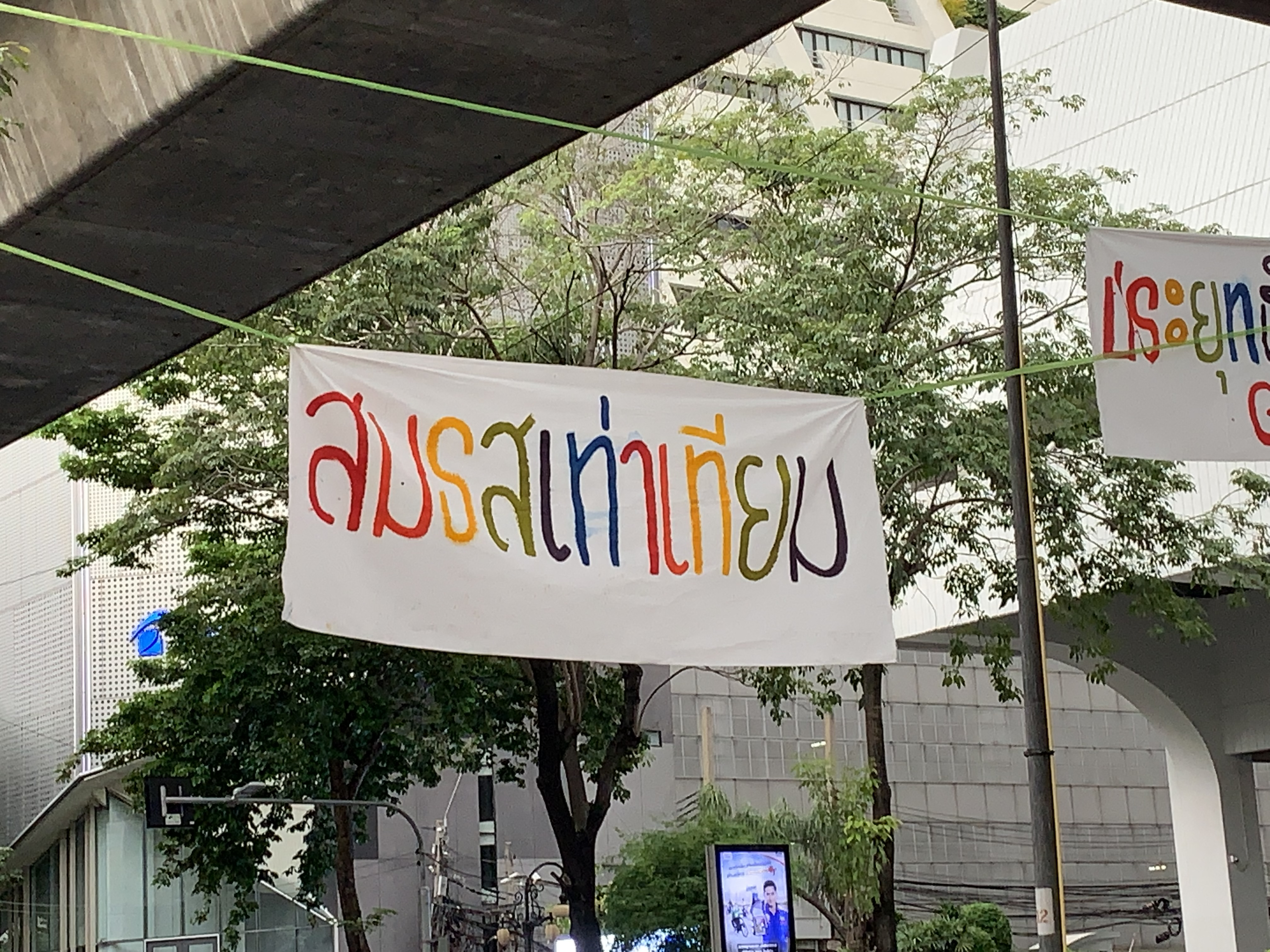
Sign reading "สมรสเท่าเทียม" (equal marriage) at Bangkok Pride 2022, two years before the law was passed

The Civil and Commercial Code Amendment Act (No 24), 2567 BE, commonly referred to as the Marriage Equality Act (Thai: พระราชบัญญัติสมรสเท่าเทียม, RTGS: phraratchabanyat somrot thaothiam), is a 2024 Thai law legalizing same-sex marriage in Thailand. The law made Thailand the first country in Southeast Asia and second country in Asia to legalize same-sex marriage after Taiwan.

== Legislative history ==
The act received royal assent from King Vajiralongkorn on 12 August 2024 and was published in the Royal Gazette on 24 September 2024. Following publication, the law would come into effect in 120 days on 22 or 23 January 2025, pending interpretation from the Council of State.

== Implementation and results ==
The Marriage Equality Act came into effect on 23 January 2025.

The implementation of the law was overseeing by the Ministry of Interior and Department of Provincial Administration (DOPA), which revised regulations in accordance with the new law and developed new rules to facilitate same-sex marriage registration. DOPA, which serves as the central registar for marriages, additionally updated its computer system and forms for marriage registration to ensure same-sex marriage registrations could proceed immediately upon the law's commencement, with a trial run conducted in December 2024.

On 26 December 2024, Governor of Bangkok Chadchart Sittipunt held a press conference "BMA Confident, Ready to Provide Equal Marriage Registration Services" alongside Permanent Secretary of the Bangkok Metropolitan Administration (BMA) Wantanee Wattana, Bangkok Pride organizer Ann Waaddao Chumaporn.

Same sex couples can register their marriage at any of Thailand's 878 provincial district offices, Bangkok's 50 district offices, and 94 embassies and consulates worldwide. Foreign couples can also register their marriages irrespective of gender, but must provide proof they are not already married.

=== Statistics ===
On 23 January 2025, 1,839 same-sex couples married in Thailand, including 661 in Bangkok and 185 at a mass registration event held at Siam Paragon, according to Bangkok Pride. The event at Siam Paragon, hosted by Naruemit Pride, brought couples in ten at a time to sign marriage documents. The Department of Provincial Administration and the Thai Interior Ministry reported 1,832 same-sex couples married on the same day.

=== Economy ===
A 2025 study commissioned by travel company Agoda projected that the Marriage Equality Act will create 152,000 full-time jobs and increase Thailand's GDP by 0.3%. The law is projected to attract an additional 4 million tourists annually and generate approximately $2 billion in revenue.

== See also ==
- Timeline of same-sex marriage
- Same-sex marriage in Thailand
