= Mahachon Party =

Thai political party

Mahachon Party พรรคมหาชน Great People's Party
- Leader: Apirat Sirinavin
- Secretary-General: Paisan Muanngern
- Founded: 10 February 1998
- Dissolved: 24 January 2020
- Preceded by: Thai Citizen Party (faction); Thai Nation Party (faction); Democrat Party (faction)
- Headquarters: Dusit, Bangkok, Thailand

Website
- http://www.mahachon.or.th/

The Mahachon Party (Thai: พรรคมหาชน, RTGS: Phak Mahachon, lit. 'Great People's Party') was a political party in Thailand.

== Background and formation ==
It was founded in 1998 under the name of Phak Ratsadon (lit. 'People's Party'). In its first years, it was dominated by a circle of former Thai Nation Party members around Air Marshal Somboon Rahong. It changed its name to the current version in 2004, and was joined by several defectors from the Democrat Party in January 2005, making it the country's second largest party, measured by the number of members. The new executives included the Democrats' former Secretary General Sanan Kachornprasart, and ex-Vice chairman Anek Laothamatas.

== 2005 election ==
In the legislative elections of 6 February 2005, the party won 8.3% of the popular vote and 2 out of 500 seats.

During the by-election in 2005 in Phichit Province district 3, the Mahachon Party won a third seat. Siriwat Kachornprasart, son of the party's leader Sanan Kachornprasart became the third MP.

Former Mahachon Party member Nitiphoom Naowarat later successfully contested the Bangkok Senator elections.

== 2006 election ==
The party colluded with two other main opposition parties to boycott the April 2006 election to make it impossible for another Thai Rak Thai-led administration to form. These elections were declared invalid. The new elections planned for October 2006 were canceled due to the September 2006 coup. After Sanan and his son Siriwat Kachornprasart left in 2007, stating that small parties had no chance under Thai electoral law, the party sank into insignificance.

== Since 2011 ==
The party was revived for the 2011 general election and won one party-list seat, agreeing to be part of Yingluck Shinawatra's coalition government.

In the 2019 general election, the party nominated Pauline Ngarmpring as their Prime Ministerial candidate, making her Thailand’s first transgender individual to run for the position.

On 24 January 2020, a Gazette Announcement of the Election Commission of Thailand was posted regarding the Mahachon Party ceasing to be a political party.
