= Gender Equality Act (Thailand) =

2015 Thai law

National Legislative Assembly of Thailand
- Long title: Gender Equality Act B.E. 2558
- Territorial extent: Thailand
- Assented to by: King Bhumibol Adulyadej
- Royal assent: 8 March 2015
- Commenced: 9 September 2015
- Status: In force

The Gender Equality Act B.E. 2558 (Thai: พระราชบัญญัติความเท่าเทียมระหว่างเพศ พ.ศ.๒๕๕๘), commonly referred to as the Gender Equality Act, is a 2015 Thai law criminalizing gender-based discrimination and recognizing diverse gender identities.

== Legislative history ==
The act received Royal Assent by King Bhumibol Adulyadej on 8 March 2015, and published in the Royal Gazette on 13 March 2015. It came into force 180 days after its publication, on 9 September 2015.

== Provisions ==
The act barred nearly all forms of gender discrimination. It established the Committee for the Promotion of Gender Equality (the “PGE Committee”) and the Committee on the Determination of the Unfair Gender Discrimination (the “UGD Committee”).

== Aftermath ==
The Act has been criticized as having limitations to protecting against gender discrimination, particularly the second paragraph of Section 17, which allows exceptions in the context of religion and national security. The Act was also cited as providing insufficient protections to transgender individuals, as it did not provide for the issuance of state documents affirming their gender identities.

In 2018, a Royal Thai Police job posting for male-only investigators was criticized as violating the Gender Equality Act. In October 2018, pro-LGBT advocates urged the Committee on the Determination of the Unfair Gender Discrimination to remove homophobic textbooks in use before the passage of the Act.

In 2019, Ukrit Jadsanam, a transgender teacher's assistant, claimed to have been illegally terminated after wearing a woman's uniform while working. Ukrit claimed the firing violated the protections enshrined in the Gender Equality Act.

== See also ==
- Anti-Discrimination Bill (Thailand)
