= Department of Provincial Administration =

Department of the Ministry of Interior, Thailand

- กรมการปกครอง
- Seal of the Department of Provincial Administration

Agency overview
- Formed: April 1, 1892
- Preceding agencies: Department of Local Administration; Ministry of the Interior
- Headquarters: 93 Atsadang Road, Wat Ratchabophit Subdistrict, Phra Nakhon District, Bangkok 10200
- Employees: 17,198 (as of 2023)
- Annual budget: 50,638,715,300 Thai Baht (2025)
- Agency executives: Chaiwat Junthirapong, Director-General; Winai Tocharoen, Deputy Director-General
- Parent agency: Ministry of Interior

The Department of Provincial Administration (DOPA) is a dependent department of the Thai Ministry of Interior. The department is tasked with maintaining security and order in Thailand's 76 provinces, along with development and implementation of civil registration systems.

== Operations ==
Following implementation of the Digital Public Service Act on 10 January 2023, DOPA developed a digital application to register digital IDs. These Digital IDs can be used to access government services and have the same validity as physical ID cards.

DOPA reports population data for Thailand. On 8 January 2025, DOPA released data showing that Thailand's population declined in 2024 by 100,000 to 65.95 million, the first time annual births fell below 500,000 since 1949.

The DOPA serves as the central registry for marriages in Thailand. In advance of the legalization of same-sex marriage in Thailand on 23 January 2025, the DOPA provided guidance to provincial leaders on implementing the new law ensuring district offices complied with the legislation.

During extended periods of poor air quality in January 2025, DOPA directed district chiefs to prevent and address PM2.5 pollution, including establishing centers to monitor wildfire and haze monitoring, public awareness campaigns, and restrictions on burning land.
