= Bangkok Pride =

LGBTQ event in Bangkok, Thailand

Bangkok Pride Festival
- Years active: 1999-2006, 2022-present
- Inaugurated: October 31, 1999
- Most recent: June 1, 2025
- Next event: 31 May 2026

Bangkok Pride Festival is an annual series of events which celebrates lesbian, gay, bisexual, transgender, queer (LGBTQ+) life in Bangkok, Thailand. The festival culminates in a pride parade held on Silom Road in June. The event is hosted by Naruemit Pride, the Bangkok Metropolitan Administration, and the Ministry of Tourism and Sports.

== History ==
Thailand's first LGBT pride celebration was the “Bangkok Gay Festival", held over Halloween weekend in 1999.

In 2022, "Naruemit Pride 2022" was held as the country's first official pride parade since 2006. Founded by Ann "Waaddao" Chumaporn, the march was supported by Governor of Bangkok Chadchart Sittipunt.

In 2023, leading opposition candidate Pita Limjaroenrat participated in the parade on 4 June 2023, along with Paetongtarn Shinawatra.

In 2024, Prime Minister Srettha Thavisin became the first Thai prime minister to participate in the festival.

With the legalization of same-sex marriage in Thailand on 23 January 2025, Naruemit Pride hosted a mass same-sex wedding at Siam Paragon.

The most recent Bangkok Pride was held on 1 June 2025. The parade was attended by Prime Minister Paetongtarn Shinawatra and other dignitaries.
