= LGBTQ history in Thailand =

The history of LGBTQ (lesbian, gay, bisexual, transgender, and queer) people in Thailand spans thousands of years. Concepts of diverse sexual orientations and gender identities have been influenced by both Indigenous and Buddhist traditions.

Some Buddhists believe that being LGBTQ may be punishment for transgressions from past lives. In the 20th century, LGBTQ people received more stringent legal regulations regarding their orientation, with restrictions being gradually eased by the beginning of the 21st century. However, activism for LGBTQ people has been slow in development due to government inaction.

== Ancient ==
Homosexuality has been documented in Thailand since the Ayutthaya period (1351–1767). Temple murals predating the Rattanakosin era (1782–1932) have been found which depict same-sex relations between both men and women. ‘Samutthakhot Kham Chan’ (สมุทรโฆษคำฉันท์), Thai literature from Ayuttaya times, mentioned lesbian relationships between the concubines living in the royal palace. In the poem, the writer wrote about the concubines sleeping together, some of them have their breasts exposed, some of them embracing each other in their sleep.

Royal law in Borommatrailokkanat, King's Reign states that if the concubines act or treat each other as lovers, they shall be whipped 50 times.

=== The notion of kathoey ===
The Thai term kathoey refers to a gender identity which is distinct from male and female, but is instead something in between or a third gender. It is often used by people who may also identify with the terms trans woman, intersex, or an effeminate gay man, and represents a mixing of "physical and psychological sex, gender behaviours and sexuality". Scholarship suggests that "an idealized hermaphroditic kathoey category" was likely inspired and shaped by Thai creation myths and Hindu-Buddhist mythology. It is also similar to the Pali term "pandaka". This mythical kathoey figure blends male and female, masculine and feminine traits in equal measure and continues to influence modern Thai ideas about gender and eroticism.

== Rama I-VIII ==
=== Prince Kraisorn ===
Prince Kraisorn, King Rama I’s son, had his own all-male theatre group. It was known to be luxurious, with Prince Kraisorn providing expensive clothing and jewelry to all the actors. These actors would dress for female parts while performing and, with the support from Prince Kraisorn, also dressed as women at public occasion like Loi Krathong festival.

According to the memorandum, Khun Thong (ขุนทอง) and Yaem (แย้ม) were two actors Prince Kraisorn adored the most, and were patronized more than the rest of the actors. Prince Kraisorn never tried to cover up his sexuality and his preference. He unashamedly spent most of his time with these actors and usually spent the night with the actors in their home not in his palace, which was very uncommon for his position as a prince. This unusual behavior of Prince Kraisorn led to the investigation where the actors confessed to performing sexual interaction.

=== Early 20th century ===
With Thailand's transition from an absolute to constitutional monarchy in 1932, "traditional" concepts of gender were enforced by the state as a means of establishing social order and propagating a national culture. Presented as a "modernization" effort, the state mimicked the Victorian middle-class movement in Europe in an attempt to portray Thailand as a "civilized nation". Part of this effort was the imposing of indoctrinated gender roles and notions of sexual orientation through state institutions like the military, police, and the educational system. Deviation from these "modern" concepts of sexual and gender identity and behavior would be seen as deviations from morality, virtue and the Thai nationhood. These state efforts turned previously flexible and diverse understandings of sexual and gender identity and turned them significantly more rigid in ways that influenced Thai culture for decades to come.

=== Princess Yuangkaeo Sirorot ===
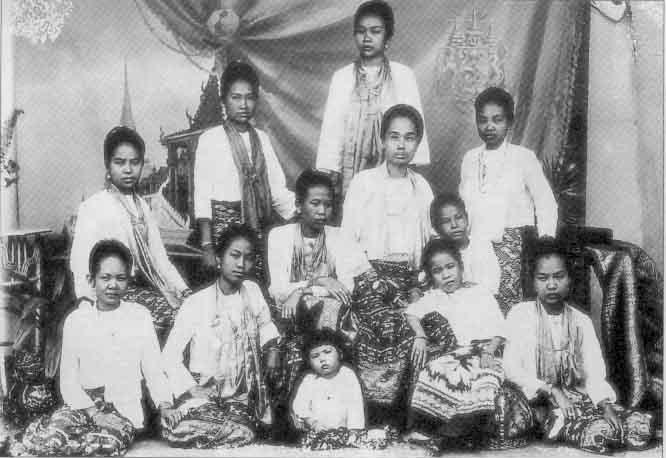
Princess Yuangkaeo with the concubines

In 1956, homosexual relationships were common among the maids working and living in the Royal palace. Princess Yuangkaeo Sirorot (Thai: ยวงแก้ว สิโรรส), was involved in a relationship with Mom Rajawongse Wongthep (หม่อมราชวงศ์วงศ์เทพ), but Mom Rajawongse Wongthep already had a lover at the time, who was also a woman, named Lady Hun. Out of jealousy, Lady Hun started a false rumor saying Princess Yuangkaeo was so infatuated with Mom Rajawongse Wongthep that she gave all the jewelry she received from the queen to Mom Rajawongse Wongthep. After the queen heard the rumor, she banished Princess Yuangkaeo to Chiang Mai as a punishment. Humiliated, Princess Yuangkaeo decided to consult with Princess Buachum, her friend at Chiang Mai. That night after Princess Buachum fell asleep, wanting to prove her innocence, Princess Yuangkaeo jumped from the top of the palace. She later died at the hospital, aged 19.

== 21st century ==
=== LGBT and the Military ===
In Thailand, all 21-year-old Thai men must partake in a lottery to determine whether they will become military conscripts, unless they have attended at least three years of reserved military training during high school or are considered unfit to serve. Men reporting for the military draft are classified into 4 groups according to their physical condition. The first is person with normal physique, the second is person whose physique is unlike persons in the previous category, the third is person with an illness which cannot be cured within 30 days, and the fourth is person whose illness is incompatible with military.

Transgender women are usually placed in the second category and treated significantly differently, as women are exempt from the military draft. Transgender women are automatically rejected and given an exemption document known as “Sor Dor 43” stamped with the wording “permanent mental disorder”. This makes it difficult for transgender women to apply for jobs in government, state enterprises or any companies which require proof of military service.

Due to high pressure from the LGBT community, in March 2006, the military agreed to change the wording but refused to revise any already given Sor Dor 43.

On 11 April 2012, new regulations were issued under the 1954 Military Service Act to use the term “gender identity disorder” in military service exemption. Following this, transgender persons can request a new Sor Dor 43 with the new wording.

=== Gender in legal documents ===
As of 2007 when the Thai legislature passed the Persons' Name Act, changing one's name is legal in Thailand. However, requests are left up to the discretion of individual administrators.

Changing one's gender marker on legal documents is not legal in Thailand. This leaves trans people vulnerable to humiliation, social stigma and discrimination in healthcare, education, the job market, and more. Thailand's 2015 Gender Equality Act prohibits gender expression-based discrimination, but has had very spotty implementation.

On 9 August 2012, Sirilada Khotphat along with Dr. Taejing Siripanich, committee of National Human Rights Commission of Thailand, and her parents arrived at district office to file a request on changing title, which marked the first legal title change in Thailand, but only for an intersex person.
