= 2008 Thai political crisis =

Political crisis in Thailand

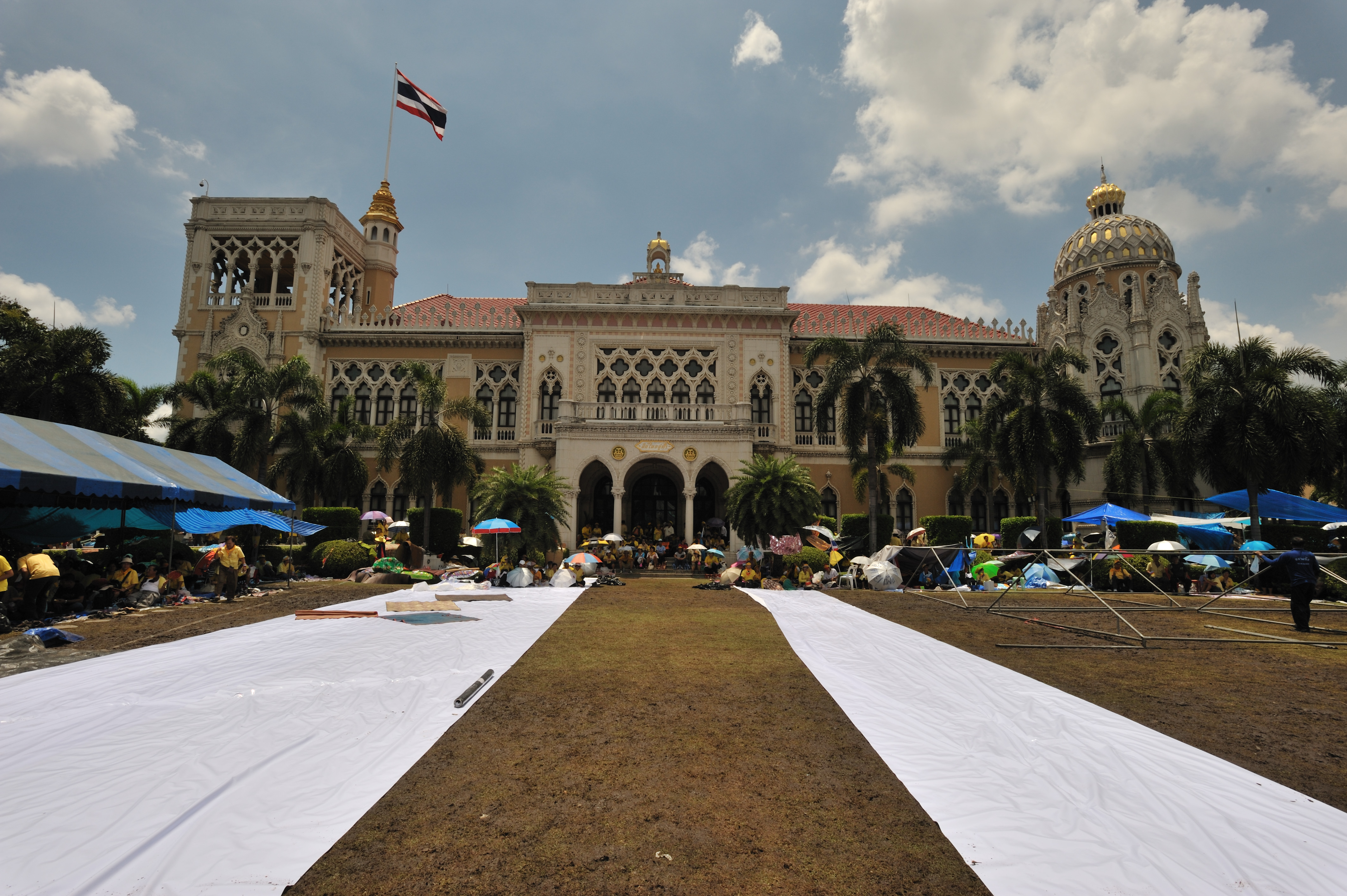
The People's Alliance for Democracy besieged and occupied Government House from August–December 2008.

Beginning in 2008, there was worsening conflict between the People's Alliance for Democracy (PAD) and the People's Power Party (PPP) governments of Prime Ministers Samak Sundaravej and Somchai Wongsawat. It was a continuation of the 2005–2006 political crisis, when PAD protested against the Thai Rak Thai (TRT) party government of Prime Minister Thaksin Shinawatra. PAD followers usually dressed in yellow, yellow being the royal color of King Bhumibol Adulyadej, and were called "yellow shirts". National United Front of Democracy Against Dictatorship (UDD) followers, known as supporters of the deposed prime minister Thaksin Shinawatra, dressed in red and were widely called "red shirts".

== History ==
Timeline of key events
2008 29 Jan	Samak Sundaravej forms a coalition government and becomes prime minister after winning the majority of seats in the 2007 general elections.
28 Feb	Former prime minister Thaksin Shinawatra returns to Thailand after his political allies win new elections and formed a coalition government. He and his wife face charges of corruption.
28 Mar	PAD regroups, threatening to resume protests against Thaksin.
25 May	PAD demonstrates at Democracy Monument, demanding Samak's resignation, and later occupies Makkhawan Rangsan Bridge.
27 Jun	Samak's government survives no-confidence motion in parliament.
1 Aug	Train and air transport are disrupted by PAD, although services would resume a few days later and state enterprise unions would not follow up on their threat to disrupt services.
11 Aug	Thaksin and his (then) wife, Potjaman Na Pombejra, skip bail and flee to the UK two weeks after she was sentenced to three years in prison for fraud.
26 Aug	PAD protesters invade Government House, three ministries, and headquarters of the NBT. Little effort is made to remove the protesters from Government House, although minor clashes between police and protesters are seen.
2 Sep	Anti-PAD protesters clash with PAD, leaving one dead and 43 injured. A state of emergency is declared in Bangkok. It would last until 14 September.
9 Sep	The Constitutional Court finds Samak guilty of conflict of interest, terminating his premiership.
17 Sep	Somchai Wongsawat, Thaksin's brother-in-law, is ratified by the National Assembly and becomes prime minister. He is rejected by PAD for being Thaksin's nominee.
29 Sep	Deputy Prime Minister Chavalit Yongchaiyudh begins negotiations with PAD leaders.
4–5 Oct	PAD leaders Chaiwat Sinsuwongse and Chamlong Srimuang are arrested by police on insurrection charges filed shortly after the invasion of Government House in August.
6 Oct	PAD protesters rally at parliament, attempting to block a parliament session in which Prime Minister Somchai is to seek approval of policies. Police attempt to disperse protesters using tear gas. Somchai is forced to cross a fence to exit, while members of parliament are stranded in the building for many hours. Intermittent clashes leave two dead and over 300 injured, including 20 policemen. Military troops are deployed to help control the situation.
9 Oct	An appeals court withdraws insurrection charges against PAD leaders and releases Chamlong and Chaiwat on bail. The following day, the remaining PAD leaders turn themselves in to police and are released on bail.
21 Oct	The supreme court finds Thaksin guilty in a land purchase conflict of interest case, and sentences him to two years in prison.
8 Nov	The UK government, where Thaksin has resided, revokes the visas of Thaksin and his (then) wife, Potjaman Na Pombejra, while the couple were travelling in China.
25 Nov	PAD blockades Don Mueang, where the government had temporary offices, and Suvarnabhumi International Airports, leaving thousands of tourists stranded. Several explosions and clashes occur in the following days.
2 Dec	After weeks of opposition-led protests, the Constitutional Court of Thailand dissolves the governing People's Power Party and two coalition member parties and bans leaders of the parties, including Prime Minister Somchai Wongsawat, from politics for five years. Wongsawat promptly resigns.

The PPP won the December 2007 general election. Though it became the largest party in the House, it did not gain an absolute majority. PPP became the leading party when five other smaller parties, previously allies of Thaksin Shinawatra, agreed to join the coalition government under Samak Sundaravej.

The coalition government vowed to amend the 2007 constitution which they called undemocratic, prompting PAD to resume protests against the constitutional amendment plan after having suspended its movement after the 2006 coup. PAD charged that the amendment was aimed at revoking charges against Thaksin and election fraud charges by PPP executive members. The Samak government suspended its amendment plan, yet PAD vowed to continue their protest, calling for Samak Sundaravej's resignation, noting that during his election campaign, he had declared himself a nominee of Thaksin. Tensions escalated when PAD seized Government House.

Samak was forced to resign in September after the Constitutional Court found him guilty of being an employee of a television cooking program after he became the prime minister. PPP deputy leader Somchai Wongsawat, vice president of PPP and a brother-in-law of Thaksin, became the new prime minister. This change prompted continued PAD protests. The protests led to violent clashes between the police, PAD, and anti-PAD protesters on 7 October as the government aimed to disperse them from blocking the entrances of the House. A PAD protester was killed by a grenade near the premier's office and a member of the PAD security forces was killed when his car exploded. Many protesters were also injured.

As PAD was attacked, it stepped up its protests by seizing the government's temporary offices at Don Mueang Airport, and the seizure and closure of Suvarnabhumi Airport after the arrest of Chamlong Srimuang, one of its leaders. The sieges ended in December when the Constitutional Court dissolved the PPP and banned its executive board from political office after finding it guilty of election fraud. The Constitutional Court dissolved two coalition partners of the PPP on similar charges, which broke the coalition apart. Prime minister Somchai resigned.

It is alleged that the army then urged MPs of a former PPP faction, the Friends of Newin Group, and MPs of the former PPP coalition partners to cross the aisle and form a coalition with the Democrat Party leader Abhisit Vejjajiva. After days of negotiations, Abhisit Vejjajiva, leader of the Democrat Party, was voted in by a margin of 235 in favor, 198 against.

The People's Alliance for Democracy opposed to what it called the "Thaksin system", which is seen by some as the Thaksin' "autocracy", his domination of independent supervisory institutions and violations of human rights and the freedom of the press. It began the mass protest against Thaksin Shinawatra in 2006 after the removal of the critical TV program of Sondhi Limthongkul. In 2008, PAD accused Samak Sundaravej and Somchai Wongsawat of being proxies for Thaksin. Samak had announced that he was Thaksin's nominee during his election campaign, Somchai is Thaksin's brother-in-law, and several new Pheu Thai Party members are former TRT/PPP members. PAD was opposed to all attempts to reform the constitution in ways that would allow politicians banned from political office to re-enter politics, and to revoking the charges against Thaksin. PAD has also called for "new politics", a "new age of politics, free from the corrupted politicians". In May 2009, PAD founded its party, the New Politics Party. One of the PAD's major aims was to oppose what it considered the anti-monarchy movement, supposedly among some Thaksin supporters. PAD promoted the role of the king as the guard of the all people's power against the "corrupted politician". That is why PAD uses yellow, Rama IX's symbolic birthday colour, Monday, as its brand. Yet its ideology was blasted by some critics as "anti-democratic".

The National United Front of Democracy Against Dictatorship (UDD) was the group consisting mainly of social activists, scholars, and Thaksin supporters who opposed the 2006 coup deposing Thaksin Shinawatra. It believed that the coup was supported by powerful persons, the "elites" or "nobles", targeting Prem Tinsulanonda, head of the privy council. The UDD aimed to topple the amatayathipatai (government run by traditional elites, nobles, and the bureaucratic polity). In the April 2009 protest, its aims were the immediate resignation of the prime minister Abhisit Vejjajiva and members of the privy council, Prem Tinsulanonda and Surayud Chulanont, as well as new elections. It also demanded that charges be brought against PAD for the 2008 airport seizures and unrest. Several members of parliament in the Pheu Thai Party were vocal in their support of UDD, as well as of Thaksin Shinawatra himself.

== Origins of the crisis ==
The 2008 crisis had its roots in the 2005–2006 Thai political crisis, the 2005 election and 2006 elections, the 2006 coup, and the 2007 general election.

Thaksin Shinawatra's Thai Rak Thai party (TRT) won a landslide victory in the 2001 election, the first elections held under the Thai Constitution of 1997. Thaksin's grassroots economic policies helped reduce poverty and provided universal health care, making him hugely popular in rural Thailand. His drug policies were effective at reducing drug use but were attacked for the large number of extrajudicial executions that resulted. He was accused of conflicts of interest due to his family's continued holdings in Shin Corporation, the telecoms business that he founded prior to becoming Premier. Despite this, he became the first politician in Thai history to finish his term. Thaksin's re-election in 2005 election had the highest voter turnout in Thai history.

Media mogul Sondhi Limthongkul had been a staunch supporter of Thaksin until major losses at state-owned Krung Thai Bank caused CEO Viroj Nualkhair to be fired. Viroj was Sondhi's former banker and had forgiven Sondhi for billions in bad personal debts. Sondhi's levied public criticisms of Thaksin on his TV show and his media outlets, the Manager Daily newspaper and ASTV.

Sondhi's People's Alliance for Democracy soon gathered supporters among Dhammayuttika Nikaya disciples of Luang Ta Maha Bua, prominent socialites and members of the Thai royal family who claimed that Thaksin frequently insulted King Bhumibol Adulyadej, several state-enterprise unions who were against Thaksin's state-enterprise privatization plans, and various factions in the Royal Thai Army who claimed that Thaksin promoted only those who were loyal to him. The movement gained in popularity after Thaksin's family sold their share in Shin Corporation to Temasek Holdings while making use of a regulation that exempted individuals from paying capital gains tax. The PAD led protests demanding that Thaksin pay additional taxes, despite the SEC and the Revenue Department saying that no wrong had been done.

The protests escalated. In February 2006, Army Commander Sonthi Boonyaratglin started secretly planning for a military coup, despite regular denials. On 14 July 2006, Privy Council President Prem Tinsulanonda addressed graduating cadets of the Chulachomklao Royal Military Academy, telling them that the Thai military must obey the orders of the King – not the Government.

The coup was executed on 19 September 2006 while Thaksin was attending a UN summit, just weeks before a planned Parliamentary election. The junta canceled the elections, abrogated the Constitution, dissolved Parliament, banned protests and all political activities, suppressed and censored the media, declared martial law, and arrested Cabinet members. The PAD voluntarily dissolved after announcing that its goals had been accomplished. Surayud Chulanont, Prem's former close aide, was appointed prime minister. A junta-appointed court banned the TRT and 111 of its executives from politics for five years. Privy Council President Prem harshly criticized Thaksin, who was in exile, comparing him to Adolf Hitler. A junta-appointed committee drafted a substantially revised constitution. Elections were scheduled for December 2007. Many TRT politicians moved to the People's Power Party. The PPP won the December elections and nominated Samak Sundaravej as Premier.

== 2008 resumption of PAD protests ==
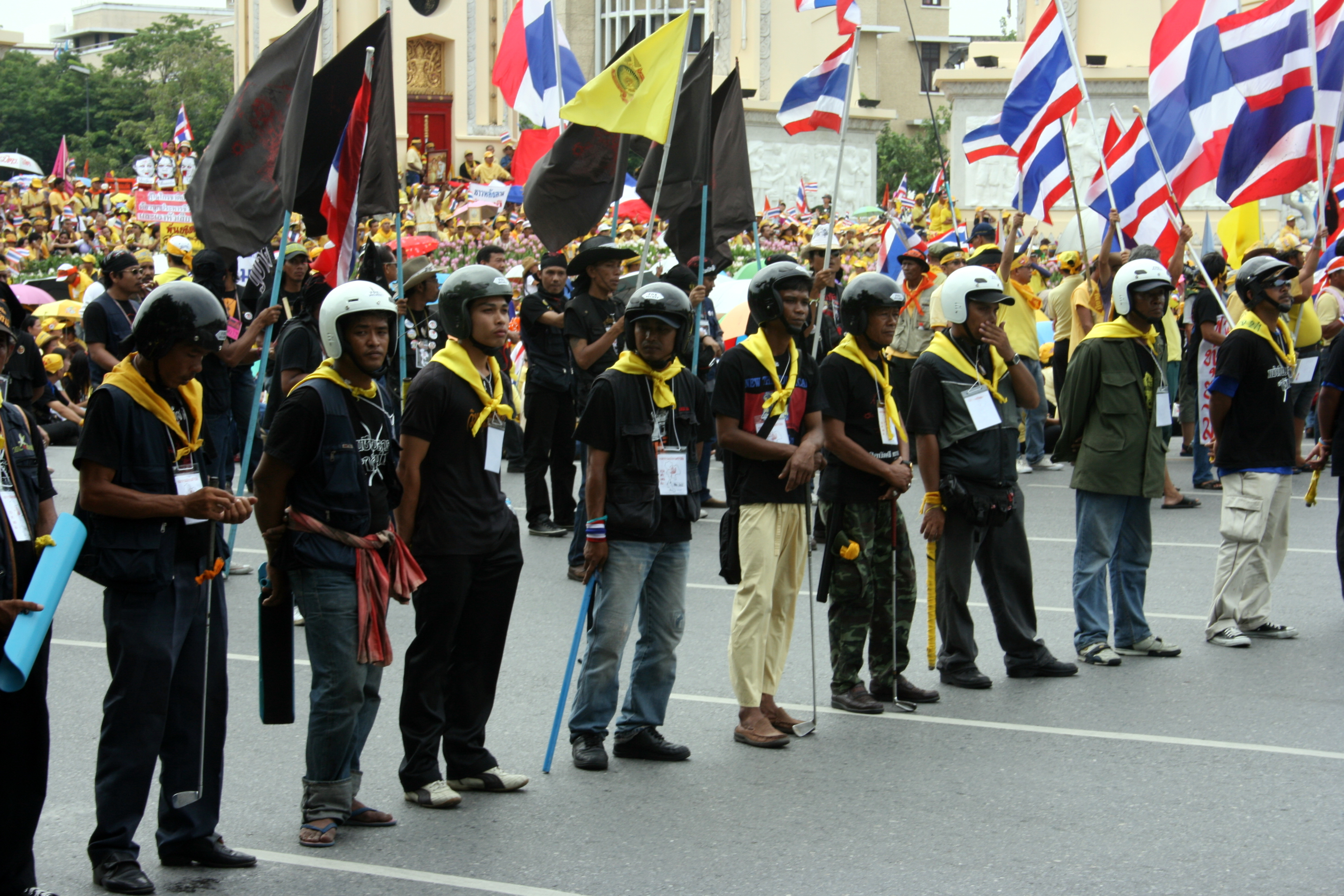
A line of PAD demonstrators in Bangkok

The Samak Sundaravej government, elected in the December 2007 general elections, came under pressure to resign since May 2008, when the People's Alliance for Democracy (PAD) reformed and staged regular street protests. They protested the government's proposals to amend the 2007 constitution, claiming that Prime Minister Samak Sundaravej and his government are acting as a proxy for former deposed prime minister Thaksin Shinawatra. The PAD also criticized the Samak government's decision to support the Cambodian government's application for the listing of the disputed temple of Preah Vihear as a World Heritage site. Tensions rose between Thailand and Cambodia as the PAD called for Thai investors to withdraw from Cambodia, the closure of all 40 Thai-Cambodian border checkpoints, a ban on all flights from Thailand to Phnom Penh and Siem Reap, the construction of a naval base at Koh Kut near the border, and the abolition of the committee which oversees demarcation of overlapping sea areas and the unilateral declaration of a Thai marine map.

In late June, the opposition filed a no-confidence motion in parliament, which the government survived. The PAD proposed that the constitution be amended to reduce the proportion of elected members of Parliament. This would disenfranchise the rural population, which the PAD viewed as being insufficiently educated to vote for anti-Thaksin Shinawatra parties.

== Siege of Government House ==
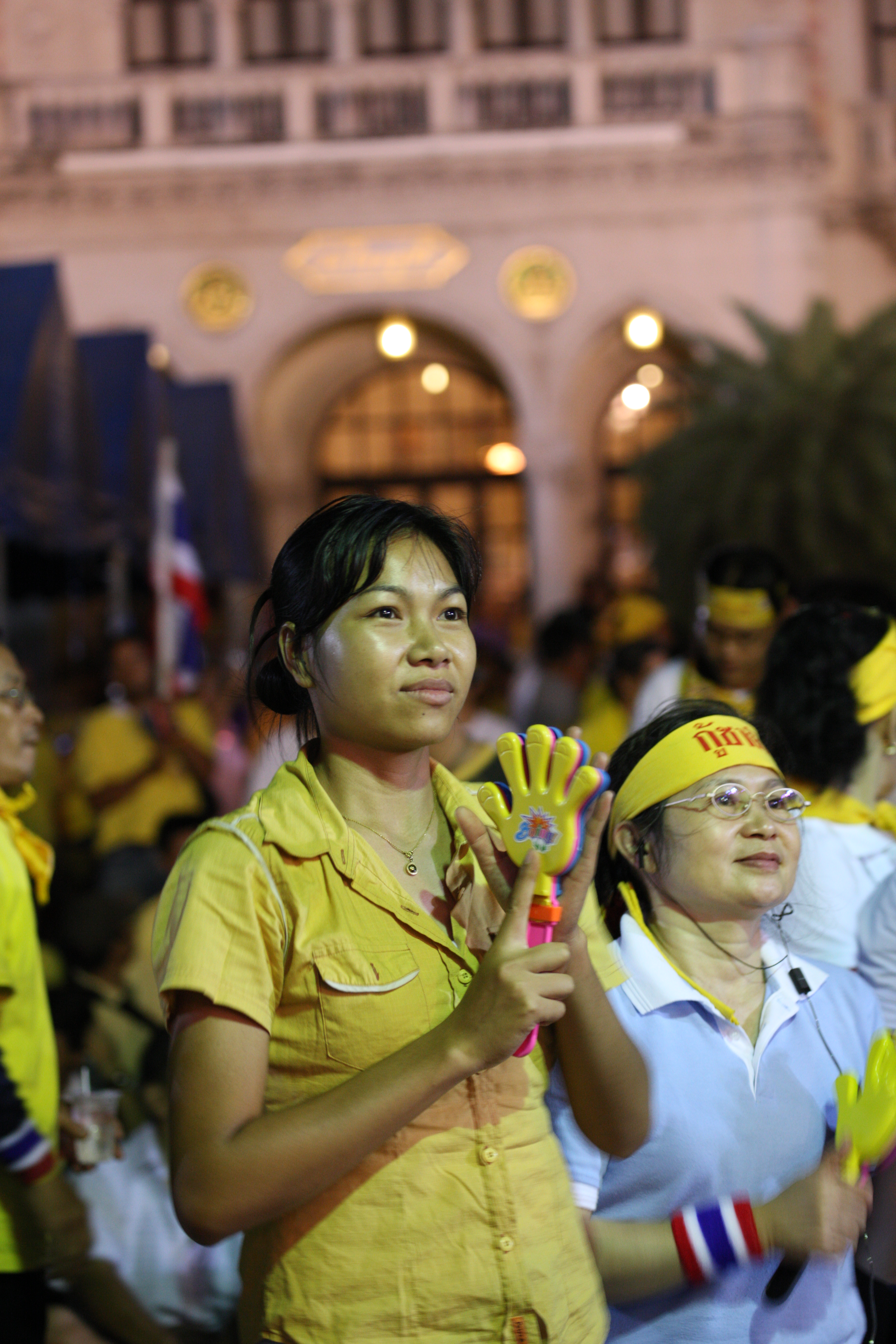
PAD protesters at the Government House on 26 August

Tensions escalated to crisis when on Tuesday 26 August the protesters stormed and occupied the grounds of the Government House, displacing the prime minister from his offices. Another armed group attacked the headquarters of the National Broadcasting Services of Thailand, while the offices of three ministries were also partially invaded. Major roads into Bangkok were blocked by PAD supporters. Prime Minister Samak remained defiant, refusing to resign, while also vowing not to violently remove the protesters. Despite a court warrant for the arrest of the PAD's nine leaders and a Civil Court order to evacuate, the PAD remained firmly lodged in the government compound. Friday 29th saw semi-violent clashes at various protest sites between protesters and riot police, who were still largely unable to control the group.

Transport infrastructure was disrupted beginning 29 August, with state railway workers union, the PAD's alliance, was on strike partially disabling train services. PAD demonstrators occupied the runways of and closed down airports in the southern cities of Hat Yai, Phuket and Krabi. (The airports later reopened on the 30th and 31st.) The State Enterprise Worker's Union threatened to disrupt public infrastructure services including electricity, waterworks, airline, bus, port and communications services, beginning with police and government offices, on 3 September.

Prime Minister Samak called an emergency session of parliament on 31 August to resolve the issue, but refused to dissolve parliament as suggested by the opposition. Meanwhile, pro-Thaksin protesters calling themselves the United Front for Democracy against Dictatorship of Thailand (UDDT) began to gather in Sanam Luang.

== September 2008 state of emergency ==
One week after the PAD began occupation of the Government House grounds, violence erupted as members of the UDDT clashed with the PAD in a melee involving firearms, resulting in 43 injuries and at least one death. Prime Minister Samak, by virtue of the Emergency Decree on Public Administration in Emergency Situation, BE 2548 (2005), declared a state of emergency in Bangkok at 07.00 hours of the following morning.

Sundaravej also put Gen Anupong Paochinda, Army Commander in Chief, in charge of the remedy of the said State of Emergency, and appointed Pol Gen Patcharavat Wongsuwan, National Police Commander in Chief, and Lt Gen Prayuth Chan-ocha, 1st Army Area Commander as assistants to Gen Anupong. He also issued bans on the gathering or assemblage of more than five persons within the Bangkok Metropolis; on the nationwide press release, distribution or dissemination of letters, publications or any other information containing the matters which may instigate apprehension amongst the people or is intended to distort information in order to mislead an understanding of the State of Emergency to the extent of affecting the security of state or public peace and order or good moral of the people; and on other matters which were a kind of public rights and liberties restriction.

However, on the same day, Mr Nitithon Lamluea, a member of Thailand Lawyer Council's Human Rights Committee, lodged with the Supreme Administrative Court a complaint against Prime Minister Samak accusing him of abuse of power as he imposed a state of emergency in Bangkok, but the circumstances on 2 September were not what was prescribed in said Emergency Decree as being a State of Emergency. The complaint also requested the Court to revoke the State of Emergency. Tej Bunnag, then the Minister of Foreign Affairs, resigned from office as he disagreed with the Government's measures to remedy the crisis and felt uneasy in representing the Government to foreigners when explaining the prevailing circumstances to them.

On 14 September, the Government issued an Announcement revoking the State of Emergency throughout Bangkok together with all the pertinent announcements, orders, and articles.

== Fall of Samak ==
On 9 September 2008, the Constitutional Court of Thailand found that Samak had hosted and received payment for hosting two cooking TV shows, "Tasting and Grumbling" and "All Set at 6 am," for a few months after he had become prime minister. He had been hosting the shows for years prior to becoming Premier. Section 267 of the 2007 Constitution of Thailand forbids members of the Cabinet from being employees of any person; this was to prevent conflicts of interest. The court found that although Samak was a contractor to the show's producers, and did not fit the definition of the term "employee" as defined under the Civil and Commercial Code, the law on labour protection or the law on taxation, the spirit of the Constitution gave a broader definition to the term. It thus found Samak guilty of breaching the Constitution and terminated his premiership.

A session of the House of Representatives was held on 12 September to vote for a new prime minister. The People Power Party decided to renominate Samak as Premier (he had stopped hosting the TV shows earlier that year and thus was no longer an employee). The session was cut short because the House lacked a quorum. The nomination of a new prime minister was postponed until 17 September, where the PPP successfully nominated Deputy Prime Minister Somchai Wongsawat as Premier.

=== Reactions to court decision ===
Karn Tienkaew, deputy leader of Samak's People Power Party, said the party planned to propose a parliamentary vote Wednesday on returning Samak to power: "Samak still has legitimacy. The party still hopes to vote him back unless he says no. Otherwise we have many other capable candidates."

On 10 September 2008, however, the PPP shied away from their earlier statement they would renominate Sundaravej and was apparently looking for an alternative candidate instead; the new PM was to be nominated on 12 September 2008.

People Power Party's deputy spokesman Kuthep Suthin Klangsang, on 12 September 2008, announced that: "Samak has accepted his nomination for prime minister. Samak said he is confident that parliament will find him fit for office, and that he is happy to accept the post. A majority of party members voted Thursday to reappoint Samak. Samak is the leader of our party so he is the best choice." Despite objections from its coalition partners, the PPP, in an urgent meeting, unanimously decided to renominate Samak Sundaravej. 5 coalition parties, namely Chart Thai, Neutral Democratic, Pracharaj, Puea Pandin and Ruam Jai Thai Chart Pattana, unanimously agreed to support the People Power party (PPP) to set up the new government and vote for the person who should be nominated as the new prime minister. Chart Thai deputy leader Somsak Prissananantakul and Ruam Jai Thai Chart Pattana leader Chettha Thanajaro said the next prime minister who will be nominated on Friday. Caretaker prime minister Somchai Wongsawat said PPP secretary-general Surapong Suebwonglee will notify the 5 parties who the PPP nominates to take office again. Some lawmakers, however, said they will propose an alternate candidate. Meanwhile, Thailand's army chief Gen. Anupong Paochinda said he backed the creation of a unity government that would include all the country's parties, and he also asked for the lifting of a state of emergency that Samak imposed on 2 September.

On 12 September 2008, the quorum for selecting the new PM was not reached and the decision was delayed to 17 September 2008 in an event seen as signaling the end of Samak's career. After its four coalition partners stated they'd prefer someone else to become PM instead of Samak, the PPP agreed to drop his nomination. Embattled Samak Sundaravej abandoned his bid to regain his Thailand Prime Minister post, and Teerapon Noprampa said Samak would also give up the ruling People's Power Party (PPP) leadership. Meanwhile, PPP's chief party spokesman Kudeb Saikrachang and Kan Thiankaew announced on 13 September that caretaker prime minister Somchai Wongsawat, caretaker justice minister Sompong Amornwiwat, and PPP Secretary-General Surapong Suebwonglee were PPP's candidates for the premiership. However, Suriyasai Katasila of People's Alliance for Democracy (a group of royalist businessmen, academics, and activists), vowed to continue its occupation of Government House if a PPP candidate would be nominated: "We would accept anyone as prime minister, as long as he is not from the PPP."

The ruling People Power Party, on 15 September 2008, named Somchai Wongsawat, as its candidate for prime minister to succeed Samak Sundaravej. Somchai Wongsawat was ratified by the National Assembly of Thailand as Prime Minister of Thailand on 17 September, winning 263 votes against 163 votes for Abhisit Vejjajiva.

== October violence ==
=== Chamlong's arrest ===
On 4 and 5 October 2008, respectively, Chamlong Srimuang and rally organizer, Chaiwat Sinsuwongse, of People's Alliance for Democracy, were detained by the Thai police on charges of insurrection, conspiracy, illegal assembly, and refusing orders to disperse (treason) against each of them and eight other protest leaders. At the Government House, Sondhi Limthongkul, however, stated that demonstrations would continue.

=== Clashes and the siege of Parliament ===
Armed with batons, PAD forces surrounded Parliament and used razor wire barricades to prevent the legislature from meeting to hear Samak's replacement, Somchai Wongsawat, formally announce his policies. The government decided to crack down on the protesters. Police used tear gas but many bullets were fired at the protesters. Many protesters got seriously wounded; some even lost legs, causing over a hundred injuries. One additional PAD leader was killed, claimed by the police, when the bomb in his car went off in front of the headquarters of the Chart Thai Party, a member of the government coalition. Several protesters lost their hands and legs, although it was not clear whether these injuries were caused by tear gas rounds or the ping-pong grenades. Pornthip Rojanasunand, Director of the Central Institute of Forensic Science, claimed that the loss of one particular PAD member's leg could not have been the result of tear gas usage, but came from a more powerful explosion. After viewing photographs of Angkhana Radappanyawut's injuries, Pornthip Rojanasunand suggested unequivocally that the death was caused by the explosion of a tear gas canister. She also stated that there was no need to conduct further investigations into the death and injuries of protesters because it became clear that they were caused by weapons of police. Investigations took place while charges against the police and government were filed by many protesters.

Afterwards, Doctor Suthep Kolcharnwit of Chulalongkorn Hospital led a campaign calling for doctors to refuse medical care to police injured during the clashes as a protest against the violence. Doctors from several major Bangkok hospitals joined him in his campaign. Doctor Suthep Kolcharnwit of the Chulalongkorn University Faculty of Medicine along with several doctors from also refused to provide medical care to police injured in the clash, and urged doctors of other hospitals to boycott police as well.

After the violent crash, the demonstrators returned; the siege of the parliament was given up in the evening. Yet demonstrators started the siege of police headquarters near the Government House. The demonstrators called for the counter-attack on police force, then new clash erupted, causing the death of a female protester and injury of several protesters. The PAD leaders called the demonstrators to return to the Government House and limit the protest only at their 'stronghold', at the House, avoid using violence. Then calm returned to Bangkok.

=== Queen's appearance ===
On 13 October 2008, Queen Sirikit presided over the funeral ceremony of Angkhana Radappanyawut, the PAD supporter who had been killed by police during the protests. The Queen was accompanied by her youngest daughter, Princess Chulabhorn, Army Chief Anupong Paochinda, Opposition Leader Abhisit Vejjajiva, and many high-ranked officials, but there were no signs of any police personnel. The Queen received a jubilant welcome from thousands of PAD supporters.

She spoke with the deceased's father, Jinda Radappanyawut, who later said she was concerned for the welfare of the protesters and "would soon send us flowers". Her Majesty told Angsana's parents that their daughter had sacrificed her life for the sake of the monarchy, and that she was a good person.

Previously, the revered Queen had donated ฿1 million to cover the medical expenses of those injured on both sides in the clashes. The protesters tried to claim the financial donation as a gesture of support for them, though in reality it went to aid injured policemen as well. The King also made a financial contribution to the dead woman's family.

Since the Queen's appearance was without precedent in modern times, many academicians and media deemed them to be "unusual" and perhaps an "explicit royal backing to a five-month street campaign to oust the elected government".

Yet one could claim in support of the PAD that really was there was a small 'anti-monarchy' movement which supported Thaksin. This disturbed many monarchists. Sondhi Limthongkul, forefront leader of PAD, had claimed this since 2005, when he started criticizing Thaksin Shinawatra for his 'inappropriate' act defaming the monarchy when Thaksin held a religious ceremony at the royal temple of Wat Phra Kaeo. From then on, PAD has accused Thaksin's followers as being 'anti-monarchy'. The UDD's and Thaksin's harsh attack on Prem Tinsulanonda, head of royal Privy Council and close advisor of the king, has been seen as a contradiction of Thai tradition and a hidden attempt to make a regime change. Moreover, a leader of UDD, such Jakrapob Penkair has engaged in public criticism of the role of the monarchy, mostly, seen 'negatively'. Several UDD leaders were also charged and arrested and accused of insulting the monarchy, a crime under Thai criminal law. The PAD, therefore, has always claimed that it was defending the most revered institution according to the Constitutions, blasting UDD and Thaksin Shinawatra as anti-monarchist. The controversial issue of the monarchy has been then one of the fierce causes among these factions' supporters.

== Airport seizures ==
=== Protest at Suvarnabhumi International Airport and closures of airports ===
On the evening of Tuesday 25 November 2008, the PAD executed what they called "Operation Hiroshima." A convoy of hundreds of armed PAD members dressed in yellow blocked the two ends of the road in front of the terminal building of Suvarnabhumi International Airport, Bangkok's main airport and an important regional hub and blockaded the main road to the airport, aiming at resisting the landing of the prime minister's flight. PAD forces quickly overpowered hundreds of policemen armed with riot gear. PAD leaders mounted a mobile stage and proceeded to criticize the government. PAD members armed with clubs, iron bars and knives, with some wearing black balaclavas, then entered the terminal, much to the surprise of the thousands of travellers inside.

== Official closure of the airport ==
PAD forces also forced their way into the control tower, demanding the flight plan for Prime Minister Somchai Wongsawat's return from the APEC summit in Peru. Somchai flew into Bangkok Don Mueang International Airport on the evening of 25 November 2008 before flying on to Chiang Mai. After hours of turmoil, the Airports of Thailand, AOT, eventually decided that all Suvarnabhumi flights were suspended, leaving thousands of travelers stranded in the airport., this action led to the official closure of the airport later.

The government called on the Royal Thai Army to restore order at the airport. The Army did not follow the orders. In a press conference on 26 November, Army Commander General Anupong Paochinda proposed that the PAD withdraw from the airport and that the government resign. He also proposed that if the PAD did not comply, that they be subject to "social sanctions", whereas if the government did not comply, that the bureaucracy stop implementing government orders. A written copy of the proposal was sent to the government. Neither the PAD or the government complied with the proposal.

At 4:30 am on the morning of 26 November, three explosions were heard on the fourth floor of Suvarnbumi on the outside of the passenger terminal. Another explosion was reported at 6 am. Several people were injured. It was not clear who set off the explosions. The PAD did not allow the police or forensics experts to investigate the explosions.

=== Attempts to evict the PAD ===
Also on 26 November, the Civil Court issued an injunction ordering the PAD to leave the Suvarnabhumi International Airport immediately. Notices of the injunction were placed on the front doors of the houses of the 13 PAD leaders. The PAD did not comply with the injunction.

On the evening of 27 November, the government declared a state of emergency around the two occupied airports and ordered police to clear out PAD forces. The state of emergency allowed the military to ban public gatherings of more than five people. The Navy was assigned to aid police at Suvarnabhumi, while the Air Force was assigned to aid police at Don Muang. The Army's spokesman noted, "The army disagrees with using troops to resolve the problem. The army does not want to do that, and it is not appropriate to do that."

The PAD was defiant. PAD leader Suriyasai Katasila announced that the PAD would fight off police. "If the government wants to clear the protesters, let it try. The PAD will protect all locations because we are using our rights to demonstrate peacefully without causing damages to state properties or rioting," Suriyasai said. Suriyasai also threatened to use human shields if police attempted to disperse the PAD.

On the morning of 28 November, PAD leader Chamlong Srimuang announced to PAD forces that he had received a call from an unspecified "senior person" (ผู้ใหญ่ท่านหนึ่ง) telling him to end the rallies. But he refused to do what the senior person told him. "For the past 108 days, the Alliance has protested together under hardship, while another group of people has remained in comfort. They can't just suddenly ask us to stop protesting," he told the assembled forces. Addressing supporters on ASTV, Sondhi said, "If we have to die today, I am willing to die. This is a fight for dignity."

Police occupied checkpoints on roads leading to the airport. At one checkpoint, police found 15 home-made guns, an axe, and other weapons in a Dharma Army six-wheel truck taking 20 protesters to Suvarnabhumi airport. One checkpoint, about 2 kilometers from the airport, was attacked by armed PAD forces in vehicles, causing the police to withdraw. Police Senior Sgt Maj Sompop Nathee, an officer from the Border Patrol Police Region 1, later returned to the scene of the clash and was detained by PAD forces. He was interrogated by Samran Rodphet, a PAD leader, and then detained inside the airport. Reporters and photographers tried to follow Sompop to his interrogation, but PAD forces did not allow them. PAD supporters were moved from Government House to the airport.

With the exception of one airplane leaving for the Hajj, no flights with passengers were allowed for eight days. The PAD was apologetic to inconvenienced travelers in the airports and offered them food.

=== End of the siege ===
Shortly after the Constitutional Court dissolved the three parties of the government coalition on 2 December 2008, the PAD held a press conference where they announced that they were ending all of their protests as of 10 am local time (GMT 7+) on 3 December 2008. "We have won a victory and achieved our aims," said Sondhi Limthongkul.

Flights from Suvarnabhumi resumed on 4 December, when a Thai Airways flight departed for Sydney, Australia. Thai Airways expected to have five other international flights departing on 4 and 5 December to New Delhi, Tokyo, Frankfurt, Seoul, and Copenhagen. Passengers for these flights had to check in at a convention centre outside the airport.

=== Views on the seizure ===
==== Democrat Party ====
Democrat Party MP for Sukhothai, Samphan Benchaphon, said of the airport seizure that the PAD "have the right to do it." Democrat Party MP for Bangkok, Thawil Praison, said that the PAD "could seize the airport and doing so is not excessive. The entire world understands that this is a normal matter in the struggle of democratic countries."

==== International reactions ====
The governments of China, France, New Zealand, Singapore, Britain, the United States, Australia, and Japan warned their citizens to avoid Thailand and steer clear of protesters at the airport.

The European Union urged the protesters to peacefully leave the airports. EU ambassadors to Thailand wrote in a joint statement that the demonstrators are hurting Thailand's image and economy, continuing "While respecting the right of protesting and without interfering in any way with the internal political debate in Thailand, the EU considers that these actions are totally inappropriate".

US State Department spokesman Gordon Duguid said that occupying the airports was "not an appropriate means of protest" and that the PAD should "walk away from the airports peacefully."

=== Closure of Bangkok Don Muang Airport ===
On the night of 26 November 2008, the services at the Don Mueang Airport were stopped after the People's Alliance for Democracy seized control of the domestic passenger terminal.

A bomb exploded near a bunker made of tires near the main entrance to the passenger terminal at Don Muang Airport at 3.55 am on 30 November. Before the explosion occurred, about seven gunshots were heard from the direction of a warehouse deeper inside the airport compound. No one was injured in the explosion. It was not clear who or what set the bomb off.

A plainclothes policewoman at the airport was identified and captured by PAD security forces and forced onto the main PAD stage inside the airport. Angry PAD protesters threw water at her and many tried to hit her. She was eventually allowed to leave the airport.

== Constitutional Court ruling on parties' dissolution ==
=== Prior to the decision ===
In December 2008, the Constitutional Court was scheduled to rule on whether or not to dissolve the PPP, Chart Thai, and Matchima Thippatai parties on electoral fraud charges. If the parties were dissolved, executives of the parties could have their political rights stripped for five years. However, non-executive MPs of the parties have the right to change parties for a period of time after the court decision. 37 PPP executives were also MPs, although 8 had resigned, leaving only 14. If the PPP was to be dissolved, the number of MPs they have would fall from 233 to 219. Out of Chart Thai's 43 executives, 19 of them are MPs. No Matchima executives are MPs. Thus, if the Constitutional Court dissolved all three parties, the government coalition would reduce in size to 283 out of a total of 447 MPs in Parliament – a majority is 224. The opposition Democrat Party has only 164 MPs. If all the non-PPP parties allied with the Democrats, they would have a total of 228 MPs – only 4 MPs above a majority.

The site for the court decision was changed from the Constitutional Court to the Supreme Administrative Court after UDD supporters surrounded the Constitution Court. The Supreme Administrative court was protected by Royal Thai Army troops armed with M16 rifles. The Constitutional Court handed down its decision immediately after hearing closing comments from the Chart Thai party.

=== Summary of decision ===
Prior to the delivery of decision, judge Chat Chonlaworn, President of the nine-judge panel, remarked that:

The Court's trials at this time are independent, and not interfered or compelled by any political influences. The provisions under the Constitution are taken as the Court's guidance in trying these cases. And in this kind of political circumstances in our Country, certain sectors would favour with the outcome of the trials while the others would not; however, the Court ask for the faith and trust in it... The Constitution of the Kingdom of Thailand, Buddhist Era 2550 (2007) contains the spirits to justify the elections, especially, through providing the provisions to prevent electoral fraud, such as vote buying. The vote buying is one of countless means chronically practiced by the politicians to be able to win the election; but, it is a severe offence and detrimental to the democratic development as well as the Country, for the politicians, after having come into the power, are brazen-faced in wrongfully seeking for self-interests in order to benefit their future elections. The Constitution, hence, attempts to pitch out this unceasing unpropitious circle, and promotes the politicians, whose heart and hands are so devoted, to participate in bringing about the advantages to the Country.

=== Following the decision ===
Prime Minister Somchai Wongsawat was, therefore, disqualified by the Court's decision, and replaced in a caretaker capacity by Chaovarat Chanweerakul, the Deputy Prime Minister.

The PPP issued a statement calling the ruling a "judicial coup", and called into question the court's procedures, for instance, allowing all the PPP's witnesses only 2 hours to speak. It also noted that the wife of one of the judges was an active PAD member, and said that these and other irregularities would likely lead the Thai people to call the integrity of the court into question and see the ruling as an alternative means of accomplishing a coup. Former PPP MPs and members founded the For Thais Party to prepare for the event that the PPP should be banned, and PPP members immediately started joining the For Thais Party.

Reelections for the 26 constituencies of the banned executive members from the three parties were held on 11 December 2008.

On 6 December 2008, the opposition Democrat Party announced it had garnered sufficient support from former coalition partners of PPP and their splinters to be able to form a government, while For Thais claimed the same, adding that it had already been joined by more than a third of MPs. The coalition partners of the Democrat Party appeared to be most of the dissolved parties, the Thai Nation Party and the Neutral Democratic Party, as well as the Thais United National Development Party, the For the Motherland party, and the "Friends of Newin" faction, a splinter of the banned PPP.

On 15 December 2008, Abhisit Vejjajiva was elected the new prime minister. Army commander and co-leader of the 2006 coup, General Anupong Paochinda, was widely reported to have coerced PPP MPs to defect to the Democrat Party. PAD leader Khamnoon Sitthisamarn and junta-appointed Senator called Abhisit's premiership a "genuine PAD victory" and a "Anupong-style coup d'etat." The circumstances of his ascent to power closely linked Abhisit to the Bangkok elite, the Army, and the Royal Palace.

== Economic effects ==
As the crisis is ongoing and fluid, the final economic consequences of the crisis are as yet unclear. After a state of emergency was declared on 2 September 2008, the SET Index reached its lowest point since January 2007 at 655.62; it had fallen 24.7% since the beginning of the PAD's demonstrations in May 2008. The baht hit a one-year low of 34.52 per US dollar, prompting the Bank of Thailand to intervene.

The PAD seizure of Don Muang and Suvarnabhumi Airports is estimated to have cost the Thai economy at least three billion Baht (approximately US$100 million) a day in lost shipment value and opportunities. As of 1 December 2008, the number of stranded passengers was estimated at anywhere from over 100,000 to 350,000.

== Political effects ==
The long term political consequences of the crisis are as yet unclear. The crisis, and particularly the siege of Suvarnabhumi Airport, saw a rise in international press coverage on Thailand, with numerous high-profile articles breaking Thai taboos about public discussion of the role of the monarchy in the crisis as well as the succession. There was a decline in the popularity of the PAD among the Bangkok elite as the crisis escalated and increasingly affected the economy. The crisis saw increasing polarization in Thai political thinking, with David Streckfuss of the Council on International Educational Exchange noting that it "shattered the myth of unity that has been papered over the many social and political cleavages in Thailand." The judiciary was increasingly seen as a tool of the elite, having flagged the government for even the tiniest infractions while refusing to rein in the growing violence of the PAD.

== See also ==
- Constitution of Thailand
- Politics of Thailand
- 1973 Thai popular uprising
- 1976 Thammasat University massacre
- 2005–06 Thai political crisis
- 2006 Thai coup d'état
- Public opinion of the 2006 Thai coup d'état
- 2009 Thai political unrest
- 2010 Thai political protests
- 2010 Thai military crackdown
- 2013–14 Thai political crisis
- Cambodian–Thai border stand-off
- 2014 Thai coup d'état
