= 2007 Thai House of Representatives =

23rd House of Representatives
←	22nd	24th	→
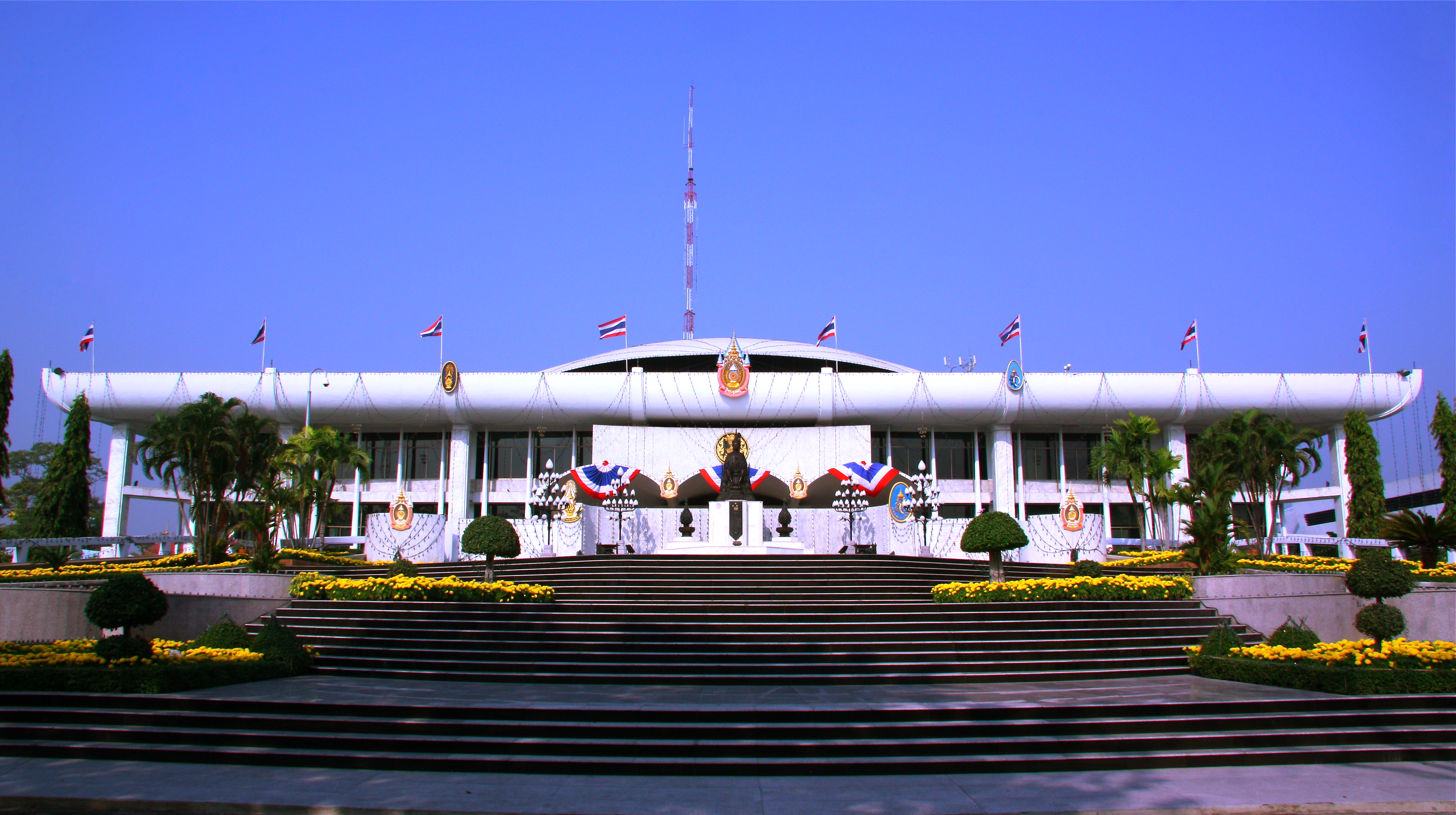
- Parliament House of Thailand

Overview
- Legislative body: National Assembly of Thailand
- Jurisdiction: Thailand
- Meeting place: Parliament House of Thailand
- Term: 23 December 2007 – 10 May 2011
- Election: 2007 Thai general election
- Government: Samak cabinet (until 18 September 2008); Somchai cabinet (until 19 December 2008); Abhisit cabinet
- Opposition: Democrat Party (until 17 December 2008); Pheu Thai Party and 2 opposition parties

House of Representatives
- Members: 480
- Speaker: Yongyut Tiyapairach (until 15 May 2008); Chai Chidchob
- First Deputy Speaker: Samart Kaewmeechai; Somsak Kiatsuranont (until 13 August 2008)
- Second Deputy Speaker: Apiwan Wiriyachai
- Prime Minister: Samak Sundaravej (until 9 September 2008); Somchai Wongsawat (until 2 December 2008); Abhisit Vejjajiva
- Leader of the Opposition: Abhisit Vejjajiva (until 17 December 2008)
- Party control: People's Power Party (until 2 December 2008); Democrat Party

Sessions
- 1st: 21 January 2008 – 20 May 2008
- 2nd: 1 August 2008 – 28 November 2008
- 3rd: 21 January 2009 – 20 May 2009
- 4th: 1 August 2009 – 28 November 2009
- 5th: 21 January 2010 – 20 May 2010
- 6th: 1 August 2010 – 28 November 2010
- 7th: 21 January 2011 – 10 May 2011

Special sessions
- 1st: 15 January 2008 – 9 January 2009
- 2nd: 25 May 2009 – 22 June 2009
- 3rd: 24 May 2010 – 3 June 2010

The 23rd House of Representatives of Thailand consisted of 480 members elected in the 23 December 2007 election, and served until its dissolution on 10 May 2011.

It saw three prime ministerships: those of Samak Sundaravej (29 January – 8 September 2008), Somchai Wongsawat (8 September – 2 December 2008), and Abhisit Vejjajiva (17 December 2008 – 5 August 2011).

== December 2008 prime minister election ==
The house's third vote for prime minister was held on 15 December 2008. After the People's Power Party was dissolved by the Constitutional Court on 2 December 2008, Somchai Wongsawat was banned from politics for 5 years. He was then removed along with several other members of the Cabinet. Chaovarat Chanweerakul was appointed acting Prime Minister until House Speaker Chai Chidchob sent a letter inviting members to attend the choosing of a prime minister on 15 December 2008, at 09:30-11:30. Banyat Bantadtan proposed Abhisit Vejjajiva, while Sanoh Thienthong proposed Pracha Promnok.

=== Results ===
==== By candidate ====
Candidate	Party	Votes	%
Samak Sundaravej	People's Power	310	
Abhisit Vejjajiva	Democrat	163	
Invalid/blank votes		1	
Abstentions		3	
Total votes		474	
Total seat		477	100.00

==== By candidate ====
Candidate	Party	Votes	%
Somchai Wongsawat	People's Power	298	
Abhisit Vejjajiva	Democrat	163	
Invalid/blank votes		0	
Abstentions		5	
Total votes		461	
Total seat		466	100.00

==== By candidate ====
Candidate	Party	Votes	%
Abhisit Vejjajiva	Democrat	235	53.65
Pracha Promnok	Pueu Pandin	198	45.21
Invalid/blank votes		3	0.68
Abstentions		2	0.46
Total votes		436	99.54
Total seat		438	100.00

==== By party ====
Party	Abhisit Vejjajiva	Pracha Promnok	No votes	No attend	Total
Pheu Thai	-	178	-	-	178
Democrat	163	-	1	1	165
Pueu Pandin	12	9	-	-	21
Chartthaipattana	14	1	-	-	15
Bhumjaithai	8	3	-	-	11
Chart Pattana	5	2	1	1	9
Pracharaj Party	-	5	-	-	5
Newin Friend Group	22	-	1	-	23
Others	11	-	-	-	11
Total	235	198	3	2	438
