= Somsak Thepsuthin =

Deputy Prime Minister of Thailand since 2023

Somsak Thepsuthin MPCh MWM
- สมศักดิ์ เทพสุทิน
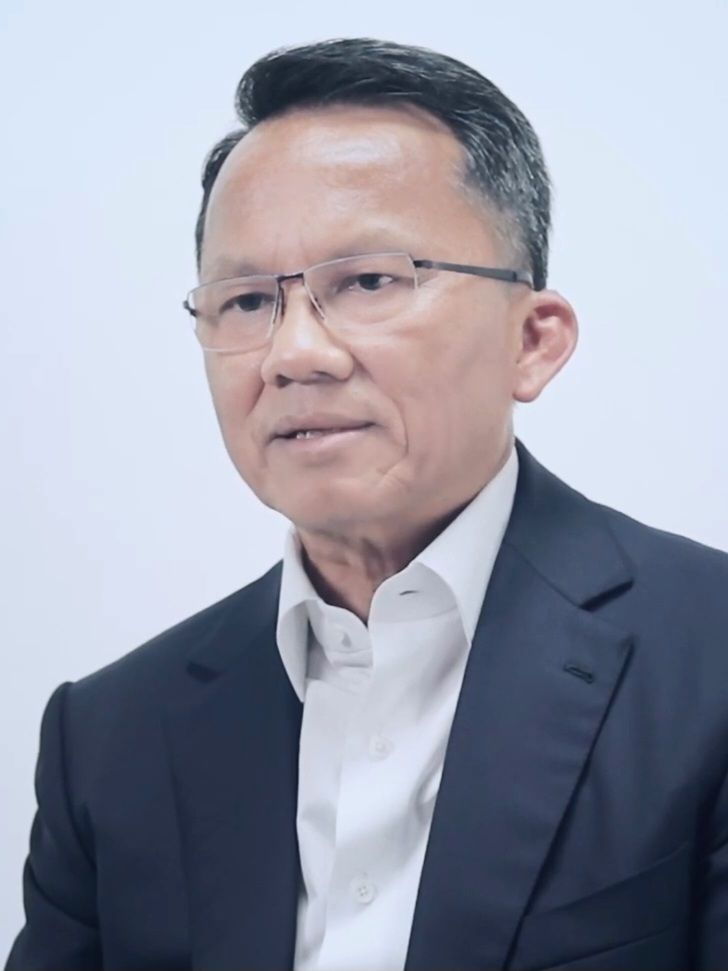
- Somsak in 2019

Minister of Public Health
- In office 27 April 2024 – 19 September 2025
- Prime Minister: Srettha Thavisin; Paetongtarn Shinawatra
- Preceded by: Cholnan Srikaew
- Succeeded by: Pattana Promphat
- In office 24 October 1997 – 8 November 1997
- Prime Minister: Chavalit Yongchaiyudh
- Preceded by: Montri Pongpanich
- Succeeded by: Rakkiat Sukthana

Deputy Prime Minister of Thailand
- In office 1 September 2023 – 27 April 2024
- Prime Minister: Srettha Thavisin
- In office 6 October 2004 – 11 March 2005
- Prime Minister: Thaksin Shinawatra

Minister of Justice
- In office 10 July 2019 – 17 March 2023
- Prime Minister: Prayut Chan-o-cha
- Preceded by: Prajin Juntong
- Succeeded by: Tawee Sodsong

Minister of Labour
- In office 2 August 2005 – 19 September 2006
- Prime Minister: Thaksin Shinawatra
- Preceded by: Sora-at Klinpratoom
- Succeeded by: Apai Chantanajunlaka

Minister of Tourism and Sports
- In office 11 March 2005 – 2 August 2005
- Prime Minister: Thaksin Shinawatra
- Preceded by: Sontaya Kunplome
- Succeeded by: Pracha Maleenont

Minister of Agriculture and Cooperatives
- In office 8 November 2003 – 6 October 2004
- Prime Minister: Thaksin Shinawatra
- Preceded by: Sora-at Klinpratoom
- Succeeded by: Wan Muhamad Noor Matha

Minister of Industry
- In office 3 October 2002 – 8 November 2003
- Prime Minister: Thaksin Shinawatra
- Preceded by: Suriya Juangroongruangkit
- Succeeded by: Pinit Jarusombat
- In office 14 November 1997 – 4 October 1998
- Prime Minister: Chuan Leekpai
- Preceded by: Korn Dabbaransi
- Succeeded by: Suwat Liptapanlop

Minister to the Office of the Prime Minister
- In office 17 February 2001 – 3 October 2002
- Prime Minister: Thaksin Shinawatra
- Preceded by: Adisai Potaramik
- Succeeded by: Pongthep Thepkanjana; Suwat Liptapanlop

Deputy Minister of Transport
- In office 18 July 1995 – 24 November 1996
- Prime Minister: Banharn Silpa-archa

Deputy Minister of Public Health
- In office 17 April 1992 – 10 June 1992
- Prime Minister: Suchinda Kraprayoon

Personal details
- Born: 13 January 1955 (age 71) Sukhothai, Thailand
- Party: Pheu Thai (2013–2018, 2023–present)
- Other political affiliations: Social Action (1977–2001); Thai Rak Thai (2001–2007); People's Power (2007); Neutral Democratic (2007–2008); Bhumjaithai (2009–2013); Palang Pracharath (2019–2023)
- Spouse: Anongwan Thepsuthin
- Education: King Mongkut's Institute of Technology Ladkrabang; Thammasat University
- Profession: Politician

Somsak Thepsuthin (Thai: สมศักดิ์ เทพสุทิน; born 13 January 1955) is a Thai politician and Minister of Public Health under Srettha Thavisin's cabinet. He served as Minister of Justice in the second cabinet of Prime Minister Prayut Chan-o-cha.

== Life and education ==
Somsak was born and raised in Sukhothai Province and later attended Amnuay Silpa School in Bangkok. He completed a Bachelor of Engineering from King Mongkut's Institute of Technology Ladkrabang and a master's degree in political science (public administration) from Thammasat University. He was elected Member of Parliament representing Sukhothai Province's first constituency for the first time in 1983. A member of the Social Action Party, he was returned in every election until 2001.

== Political career ==
He served as deputy minister of public health in Suchinda Kraprayoon's cabinet from April to May 1992 (during Black May). From September 1992 to September 1993 he served as deputy minister of transport and communication under Chuan Leekpai and again from September 1996 to October 1997 under Chavalit Yongchaiyudh. Subsequently, he was shortly Minister of Public Health under the same prime minister until the government's resignation in the following month. In the second government of Chuan Leekpai, Somsak was the Minister of Industry from November 1997 to October 1998.

Having switched to Thaksin Shinawatra's Thai Rak Thai Party (TRT), Somsak was elected to the House of Representatives on the TRT party-list in the 2001 general election, while his wife Anongwan Thepsuthin succeeded him as MP for the first constituency of Sukhothai Province. In Thaksin's government that came into office in September 2001, Somsak first served as Minister to the Office of the Prime Minister, before switching to the Ministry of Industry in October 2002 and the Ministry of Agriculture in November 2003. In Thaksin's second government, Somsak held the office of Minister of Tourism and Sports from March to August 2005 and subsequently Minister of Labour until the 19 September 2006 coup d'état.

Being a member of the TRT party's executive committee, Somsak was barred from holding political office for five years upon the dissolution of the party by the Constitutional Court. Nevertheless, he founded the Matchima ("neutral") group, that first merged into Sanoh Thienthong Pracharaj Party before separating and becoming the Neutral Democratic Party (NDP) in October 2007. As Somsak was officially barred, his wife Anongwan became the party's secretary-general. The party won seven constituency seats in the December 2007 general election and joined the government coalition led by People's Power Party (PPP) and Samak Sundaravej. In Samak's government and that of his successor Somchai Wongsawat, Anongwan Thepsuthin served as Minister of Natural Resources and Environment from February to December 2008. The Constitutional Court dissolved the Neutral Democratic Party together with its coalition partners PPP and Thai Nation Party for election fraud on 2 December 2008.

Political offices
Preceded by Prajin Juntong	Minister of Justice; 2019–2023	Succeeded by Thawee Sodsong
