= Friends of Newin Group =

Faction in the Thai People's Power Party

The Friends of Newin Group (Thai: กลุ่มเพื่อนเนวิน) was a Thai political faction within the People's Power Party (PPP) led by Newin Chidchob, the former Thai Rak Thai cabinet minister. Following the 2008 political crisis and the Constitutional Court’s decision to dissolve the PPP, these MPs defected to the Bhumjaithai Party.

The Friends of Newin Group was formed as a faction within the PPP after the 2007 election in which the pro-Thaksin PPP under Samak Sundaravej won the plurality of seats in the National Assembly. This faction had the highest number of PPP MPs.

After the indictment and resignation of Prime Minister Samak Sundaravej in September 2008, Somchai Wongsawat gained the faction's votes, and the group voted for Somchai for prime minister. Somchai had to resign as the Constitutional court dissolved the People's Power Party and two other coalition partners for election fraud on December 2, 2008. The Friends of Newin Group's MPs were given 60 days to register to a new party or to join an existing one.

On 9 December 2008, the group's leader Newin Chidchob caused a breakthrough in Thai politics by announcing his support for Democrat Party leader Abhisit Vejjajiva, of the party that was in opposition to the PPP-led government, as the next prime minister of Thailand. He assured Abhisit and Suthep Thaugsuban (General Secretary of the Democrat Party) that he and his group would vote for Abhisit for prime minister, thereby crossing the aisle. It is alleged that Army commander and co-leader of the 2006 coup, General Anupong Paochinda, coerced the MPs of the Friends of Newin Group to endorse a Democrat Party-led coalition, which would secure enough parliamentary votes to allow Abhisit to be elected prime minister On December 13, Thaksin Shinawatra, Newin's former boss and benefactor, in a recorded message played at a National United Front of Democracy Against Dictatorship (or UDD) rally, blasted the group as 'traitors and betrayers of the people.' On December 15, 235 MPs in the House of Representatives voted for Abhisit versus 198 votes for Pracha Promnok endorsed by the pro-Thaksin party, Pheu Thai Party. Abhisit, leader of the Democrat Party, became the new prime minister. Thereafter, the MPs of the Friends of Newin Group founded the Bhumjaithai Party.

== Members ==
The Bhumjaithai Party, where the former Friends of Newin MPs are now, has about 32 members in the House of Representatives in 2011:

- Chavarat Charnvirakul - former acting PM, not an MP
- Ransri Timatoka
- Monchai Chatwattanasiri
- Prasit Tangsrikiartikul
- Snong Thepauksonarong
- Sophon Saram
- Panya Sripanya
- Chakrin Pattanathamrongchit
- Apirom Polwiset
- Boonjong Wongthrairat
- Supachai Phosu
- Veera Rakkwamsuk (died August 24, 2009)
- Thevarit Nikorndej
- Chai Chidchob - Newin's father and President of the Parliament, Speaker of the House
- Permpoon Thongsiri
- Prutthichai Viriyaroj
- Pattana Sangsthram
- Chertchai Vicheinvan
- Thaweewat Ruthirachai
- Suchart Chokchaivatthanakarn
- Prachak Keawklahan
- Chatuphorn Chareonchue
- Vichien Udomsak
