= Neutral Democratic Party =

Banned political party in Thailand

Neutral Democratic Party พรรคมัชฌิมาธิปไตย
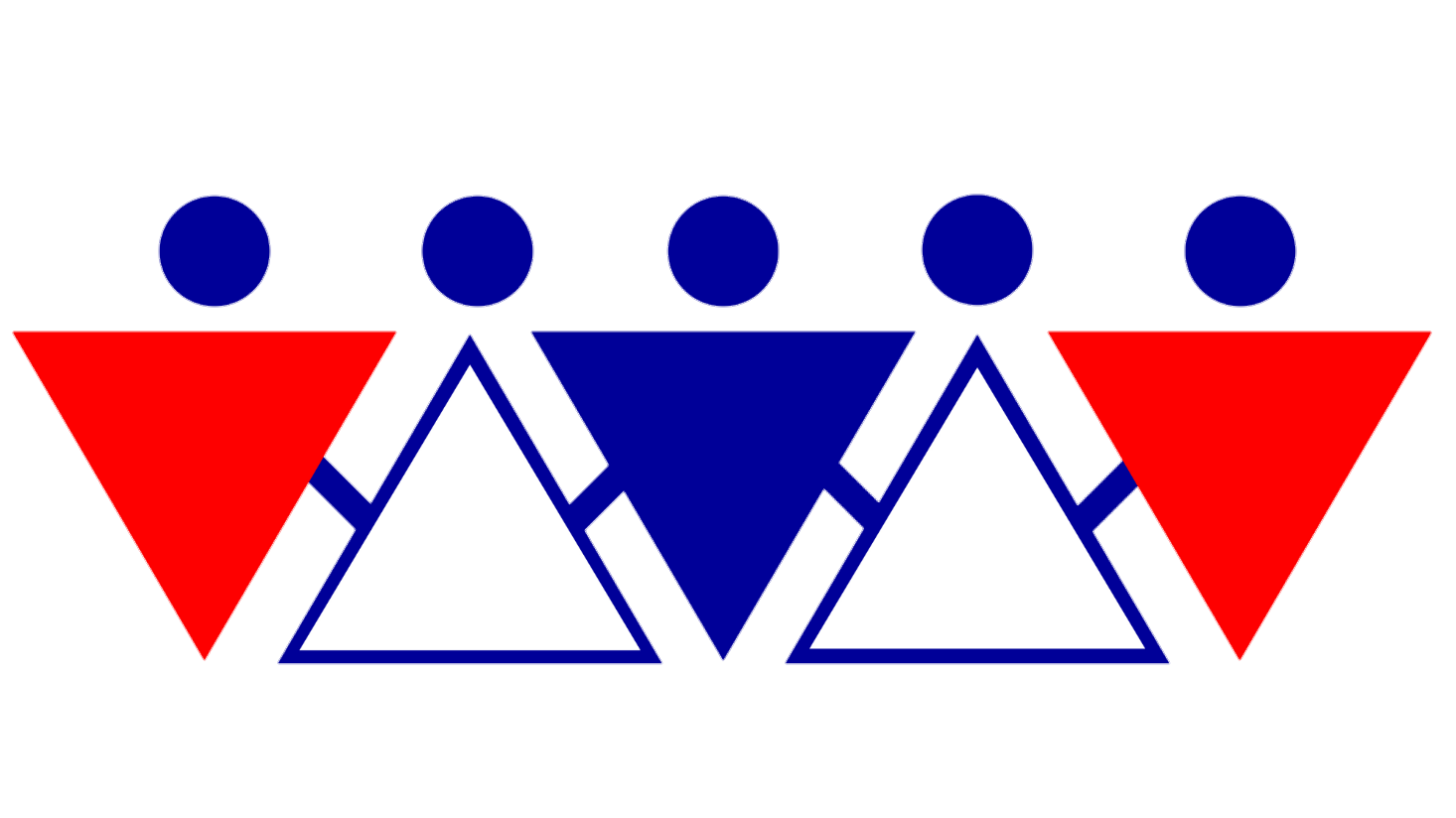
- Leader: Anongwan Thepsuthin
- Founder: Somsak Thepsuthin
- Founded: 1 October 2007
- Dissolved: 2 December 2008
- Split from: Thai Rak Thai Party
- Succeeded by: Bhumjaithai Party (de facto)
- Political position: Centre
- Colors: Red and Blue

Website
- Official website

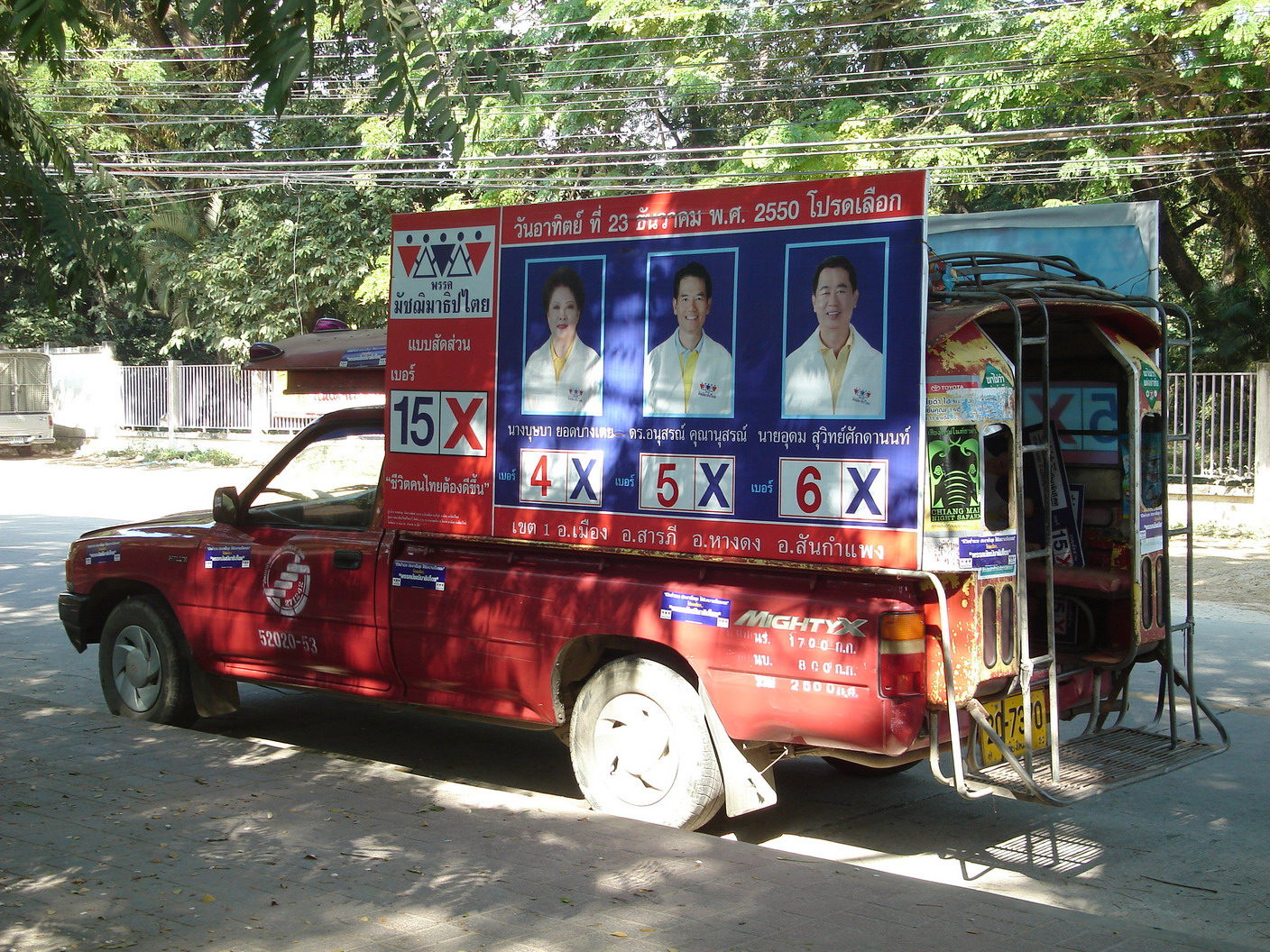
Canvassing car of the Neutral Democratic Party in Chiangmai 2007

The Neutral Democratic Party (PMT; Thai: พรรคมัชฌิมาธิปไตย) was a short-lived populist political party in Thailand founded in 2007 by Somsak Thepsuthin, a former Thai Rak Thai Party cabinet minister. The party had a similar populist line to the Thai Rak Thai and was expected to secure votes from Thai Rak Thai supporters. The party was dissolved by the Constitutional Court in 2008 and party members subsequently moved to the Bhumjaithai Party.

The party was planned to merge with the For the Motherland Party and later on the Royalist People's Party, however, both plans were annulled.

On October 15, 2007, Prachai Liewpairat, formerly Royalist People's Party Secretary-general and financier, was elected as the party's leader, and Anongwan Thepsuthin, Somsak's wife, was elected as the party's secretary-general. This move has raised many eyebrows in Thailand's political landscape. The birth of a new party, with a woman in charge of the second most important position, had caused a stir. For some advocates of women's rights, Thailand's long struggle to break male dominance in politics was thought to have partly been enlivened. As they note, in the second Thaksin government of 2005, only one of the 36 cabinet ministers and one governor out of 76 were women, while only 10 percent of the members of Parliament and Senate were women.

The Neutral Democratic Party participated in the 2007 general election and won 5.36% of the vote (7 of 480 seats), coming in sixth. In January 2008, the Neutral Democratic Party joined the winning party of the election, PPP and five other parties to form a coalition.

After the party's disappointing election result in the 2007 Election, the party leader, Prachai Liewpairat resigned. On 25 February 2008, party members gathered together for the party annual meeting in Sukhothai province, hometown of Somsak Thepsuthin. They elected the new leader, secretary-general, deputy leaders, spokesperson and the new executive board. Former secretary general and the Minister of Natural Resources and Environment, Anongwan Thepsuthin became the new leader and Chai-Nat province MP Porntiwa Nakasai became the new secretary general. This the party the first party in Thailand to have women as both the leader and secretary general.

Along with the coalition members People Power Party (PPP) and Thai Nation Party, the Neutral Democratic Party was dissolved by the Constitutional Court on December 2, 2008, with party executives banned from politics for five years. The non-executive MPs of the parties were given 60 days to reorganize under new parties. The non-executive MPs from the Neutral Democratic Party defected to the Bhumjai Thai Party. They and the former members of the Friends of Newin Group, a faction of the PPP, decided to form a coalition government led by Abhisit Vejjajiva, leader of the Democrat Party.
