= Bhumjaithai Party =

Thai political party

Bhumjaithai Party พรรคภูมิใจไทย
- Abbreviation: BJT
- Leader: Anutin Charnvirakul
- Secretary-General: Chaichanok Chidchob
- Spokesperson: Boonthida Somchai; Natchanon Srikokuea
- Founder: Newin Chidchob
- Founded: 5 November 2008; 18 years ago
- Preceded by: Neutral Democratic Party (de facto); Friends of Newin Group (main)
- Headquarters: 2159/11 Phahonyothin Road, Lat Yao Subdistrict, Chatuchak, Bangkok
- Membership (2023): 61,703
- Ideology: Conservatism; Economic liberalism; Monarchism; Populism
- Political position: Centre-right to right-wing
- Colours: Dark blue
- Slogan: พูดเเล้วทำ (RTGS: Phutlaewtham; 'Said and done!')
- House of Representatives: 192 / 500
- PAO Chief Executives (including party affiliates): 33 / 76

Website
- bhumjaithai.com

Bhumjaithai Party (BJT; Thai: พรรคภูมิใจไทย; RTGS: Phak Phumchaithai, lit. 'Thai Proud Party') is a major conservative populist political party in Thailand. It was founded on 5 November 2008, in anticipation of the 2 December 2008 Constitutional Court ruling that dissolved its de facto predecessor, the Neutral Democratic Party (PMT), along with the People's Power Party (PPP) and the Thai Nation Party. After those dissolutions, former members of the PMT and the Friends of Newin Group (KPW) faction of the PPP switched to this party. It currently heads a majority government.

Bhumjaithai has a populist platform, with some policies drawn from Thaksin Shinawatra's populist Thai Rak Thai party and its second incarnation, the PPP. The party has a strong base in Buriram Province.

== History ==
The first logo of the Bhumjaithai Party (2008–2025)

On 15 December 2008, the party endorsed the Democrat Party, forming a six-party coalition government under Prime Minister Abhisit Vejjajiva. The party's "de facto" leader and power broker behind joining the Democrat-led coalition is Newin Chidchob. Due to his role as an executive of the PPP predecessor party, the Thai Rak Thai party, which was dissolved in 2007, he became ineligible to be a party member for five years. It is alleged that army commander and co-leader of the 2006 coup, general Anupong Paochinda, coerced the MPs of the Friends of Newin Group faction in the PPP to endorse a Democrat Party-led coalition. This secured enough parliamentary votes to allow Abhisit to be elected prime minister. Bhumjaithai was the second largest coalition partner in the Abhisit government, supplying the ministers of Transport, Commerce, and Interior (Chavarat Charnvirakul), and four deputy ministers.

For the general election on 3 July 2011, Bhumjaithai forged an alliance with coalition partner Chartthaipattana Party. The party aimed at winning as many as 111 seats in the new parliament. During the campaign, a main BJT canvasser, Suban Chiraphanwanit, was shot dead. Eventually, BJT won 34 of the 500 seats in the House of Representatives, which observers have interpreted as disappointing. Subsequently, the party's Matchima-faction, led by Somsak Thepsuthin, tried to join the Pheu-Thai-led coalition government of Prime Minister-designate Yingluck Shinawatra, despite the party's ruling out cooperation with Pheu Thai before the elections. The Pheu Thai Party rejected the participation of BJT members.

On 14 October 2012, Anuthin Charnvirakul was elected the new leader of the Bhumjaithai Party during the party's general assembly to elect a new 11-member executive committee. He replaced his father Chavarat Charnvirakul, who had resigned. Also elected were Saksayam Chidchob as the new secretary-general, Nathee Ratchakijprakarn as treasurer, Sora-ath Klinprathum as an executive committee member and party advisory chairman, and Supamas Issarapakdi as party spokeswoman.

=== 2025 ===
On 18 June 2025 the Bhumjaithai Party announced its withdrawal from Thailand's ruling coalition government led by the Pheu Thai Party. This decision followed the leak of a phone conversation between Prime Minister Paetongtarn Shinawatra and former Cambodian Prime Minister Hun Sen, which raised concerns about national sovereignty amid ongoing border tensions between Thailand and Cambodia. In a statement by the Bhumjaithai party, all party ministers have submitted their resignations to the prime minister, effective 19 June.

== Ideology ==
Bhumjaithai Party combines elements of conservatism, populism, and economic liberalism in its policy platform. The party's approach to governance is characterised by welfare-oriented developmental policies while maintaining traditional conservative values, particularly regarding the monarchy.

== Bhumjaithai Party Prime Ministers ==
Name	Portrait	Start Date	End Date	Election
Anutin Charnvirakul		7 September 2025 (first term) 19 March 2026 (second term)	Incumbent	— (26th)
Anutin Charnvirakul		7 September 2025 (first term) 19 March 2026 (second term)	Incumbent	2026 (27th)

== Bhumjaithai Party Speaker ==
Name	Portrait	Start Date	End Date	Election
Sophon Saram		16 March 2026	Incumbent	2026 (27th)

== Election results ==
=== General elections ===
Election	Total seats won	Total votes	Share of votes	Seat change	Outcome of election	Election leader
2011	34 / 500	1,281,652	3.83%	▲2 seats	Junior partner in opposition coalition	Chavarat Charnvirakul
2014	Election Nullified (Ruled as Unconstitutional)					Anutin Charnvirakul
2019	51 / 500	3,732,883	10.33%	▲17 seats	Junior partner in governing coalition	Anutin Charnvirakul
2023	71 / 500	1,138,202	2.99%	▲20 seats	Junior partner in governing coalition (until 2025)	Anutin Charnvirakul
2023	71 / 500	1,138,202	2.99%	▲20 seats	Opposition (2025)	Anutin Charnvirakul
2023	71 / 500	1,138,202	2.99%	▲20 seats	Minority governing coalition (after 2025)	Anutin Charnvirakul
2026	192 / 500	5,964,814	18.07%	▲121 seats	Governing coalition	Anutin Charnvirakul

=== Bangkok Metropolitan Administration elections ===
==== Bangkok Metropolitan Council elections ====
Election	Total seats won	Total votes	Share of votes	Outcome of election
2022	0 / 50	19,789	0.85%	No members in Bangkok Metropolitan Council
2026	0 / 50	-	-%	TBA

== See also ==
- Neutral Democratic Party
- Friends of Newin Group
- List of political parties in Thailand
