= Chavarat Charnvirakul =

Thai politician and businessman (born 1936)

Chavarat Charnvirakul MPCh WMW
- ชวรัตน์ ชาญวีรกูล 陳景鎮
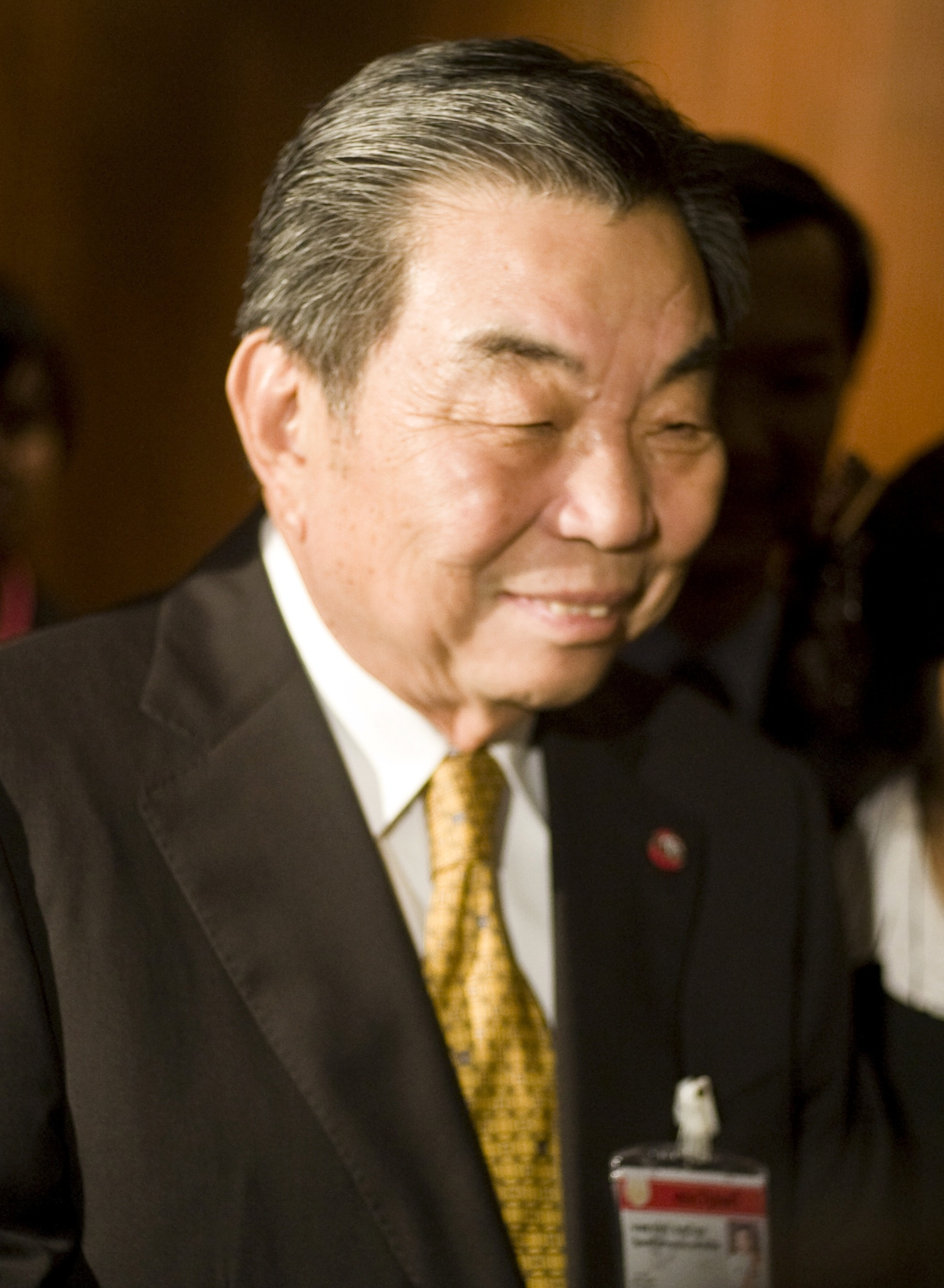
- Chavarat in 2009

Acting Prime Minister of Thailand
- In office 2 December 2008 – 17 December 2008
- Monarch: Bhumibol Adulyadej
- Preceded by: Somchai Wongsawat
- Succeeded by: Abhisit Vejjajiva

Deputy Prime Minister of Thailand
- In office 24 September 2008 – 16 December 2008
- Prime Minister: Somchai Wongsawat; Himself (acting)

Minister of the Interior
- In office 20 December 2008 – 6 August 2011
- Prime Minister: Abhisit Vejjajiva
- Preceded by: Kowit Wattana
- Succeeded by: Yongyuth Wichaidit

Minister of Public Health
- In office 2 August 2008 – 23 September 2008
- Prime Minister: Samak Sundaravej
- Preceded by: Chaiya Sasomsub
- Succeeded by: Chalerm Yubamrung

Minister of Social Development and Human Security
- In office 24 May 2008 – 2 August 2008
- Prime Minister: Samak Sundaravej
- Preceded by: Sutha Chansaeng
- Succeeded by: Anusorn Wongwan

Leader of the Bhumjaithai Party
- In office 14 February 2009 – 3 September 2012
- Preceded by: Pipat Promvaraporn
- Succeeded by: Anutin Charnvirakul

Member of the House of Representatives
- In office 3 July 2011 – 9 December 2013
- Constituency: Party-list

Personal details
- Born: 7 June 1936 (age 90) Bangkok, Siam
- Party: Bhumjaithai (since 2009)
- Other political affiliations: People's Power (2007–2008)
- Spouse: Tassanee Chanweerakul
- Children: Anutin Charnvirakul
- Education: Thammasat University
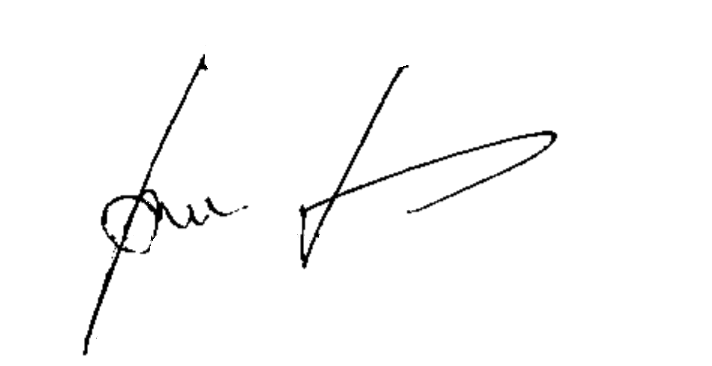
- Signature

Chinese name
- Traditional Chinese: 陳景鎮
- Simplified Chinese: 陈景镇
Transcriptions
Standard Mandarin
- Hanyu Pinyin: Chén Jǐngzhèn
Yue: Cantonese
- Jyutping: can4 ging2 zan3

Chavarat Charnvirakul (Thai: ชวรัตน์ ชาญวีรกูล, RTGS: Chawarat Chanwirakun, Thai pronunciation: [t͡ɕʰá.wá.rát t͡ɕʰaːn.wiː.rá.kun]; born 7 June 1936) is a Thai politician who briefly served as an acting prime minister of Thailand following 2008 Thai political crisis. His family is of Thai Chinese descent with ancestry from Guangdong. He is the father of 32nd prime minister, Anutin Charnvirakul.

== Education ==
Chavarat graduated from Thammasat University in 1966 with a degree in economics.

== Political career ==
After spending many years in the public sector, he joined the government in 1994 as Deputy Minister of Finance, his tenure lasted till 1997. In 2008 he rejoined the government as Minister of Public Health and later Deputy Prime Minister of Thailand.

On 2 December 2008, the Constitutional Court ordered the dissolution of the People's Power Party and other coalition parties, at the same time banning their chief executives. The incumbent Prime Minister, Somchai Wongsawat, was then removed along with several other members of the Cabinet. Chavarat, however, was the only senior Cabinet figure who was not a party executive and was therefore the only viable candidate. Either the House of Representatives of Thailand had to confirm him as the new Prime Minister, or the new political grouping must vote for a new leader and submit his name for approval.

There has been some questions - even a letter submitted to the Constitutional Court by Senators - concerning the legality of his temporary appointment as Prime Minister (even in a caretaker capacity). This is because the 2007 Constitution of Thailand states that the Prime Minister must be a member of the House of Representatives; Chavarat was not an MP. Chavarat was replaced by Abhisit Vejjajiva on 15 December 2008. He was appointed Minister of Interior of Thailand in the Abhisit cabinet, a post which he held until the government's electoral defeat in 2011. On 14 February 2009, Chavarat became the leader of the Bhumjai Thai Party until 4 September 2012, in which he was succeeded by his son, Anutin Charnvirakul.

== Royal decorations ==
- Knight Grand Cordon (Special Class) of The Most Noble Order of the Crown of Thailand
- Knight Grand Cordon (Special Class) of the Most Exalted Order of the White Elephant
- Honorary Commander of the Most Excellent Order of the British Empire (CBE)

Political offices
| Vacant Title last held by Trairong Suwankiri | Deputy Minister of Finance of Thailand; 1994–1995 with Amnuay Patise | Vacant Title next held by Praphat Phothasuthon; Newin Chidchob |
| Vacant Title last held by Sermsak Karun; Chaiwat Wiboonsawat | Deputy Minister of Finance of Thailand; 1996–1997 with Tawatwong na Chiang Mai; Chaturon Chaisang | Succeeded by Chaturon Chaisang; Surasak Nananukul; Maruay Phadungsit |
| Vacant Title last held by Sutha Chansaeng | Minister of Social Development and Human Security of Thailand; 2008 | Succeeded by Anusorn Wongwan |
| Vacant Title last held by Chaiya Sasomsap | Minister of Public Health of Thailand; 2008 | Succeeded by Chalerm Yubamrung |
| Preceded by Somchai Wongsawat; Mingkwan Saengsuwan; Surapong Suebwonglee; Sahas Bunditkul; Sanan Kachornprasart; Kowit Wattana; Man Phatthanothai | Deputy Prime Minister of Thailand; 2008 with Chavalit Yongchaiyudh; Sompong Amornwiwat; Olarn Chaipravat; Sanan Kachornprasart | Succeeded by Suthep Thaugsuban; Kobsak Sabhavasu; Sanan Kachornprasart |
| Preceded by Somchai Wongsawat as Prime Minister | Prime Minister of Thailand; Acting; 2008 | Succeeded by Abhisit Vejjajiva as Prime Minister |
| Preceded by Kowit Wattana | Minister of Interior of Thailand; 2008–2011 | Succeeded by Yongyuth Wichaidit |
Party political offices
| Preceded by Phiphat Phromwaraphon | Leader of Bhumjai Thai Party; 2009–2012 | Vacant Bunjong Wongtrairat (Acting) Title next held by Anutin Charnvirakul |
