= Thai legislative election, 2006 =

Two elections were scheduled in Thailand in 2006 for the lower house of the Thai National Assembly, the House of Representatives:

- April 2006 Thai legislative election and
- October 2006 Thai legislative election
