= Somchai Wongsawat =

Prime Minister of Thailand in 2008

Somchai Wongsawat MPCh MVM
- สมชาย วงศ์สวัสดิ์
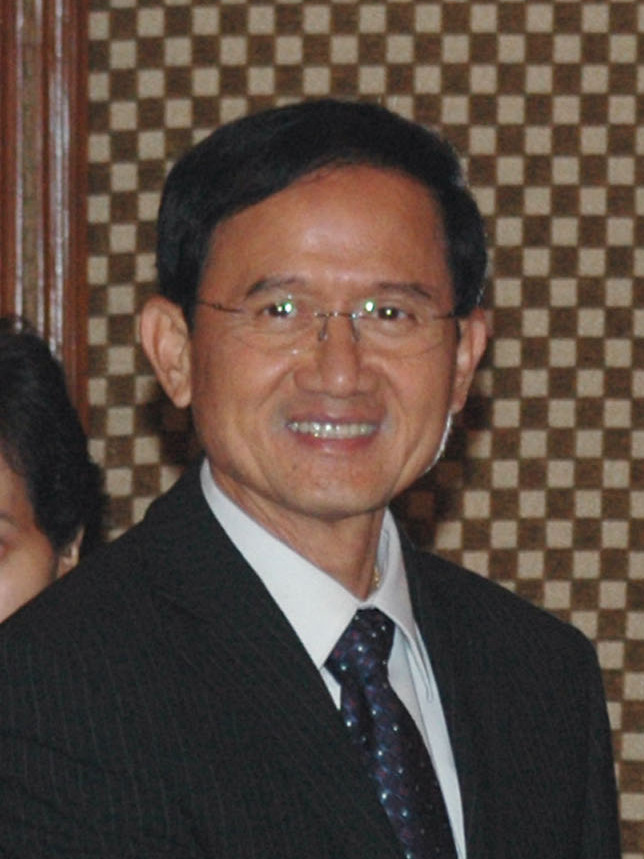
- Somchai in 2008

26th Prime Minister of Thailand
- In office 18 September 2008 – 2 December 2008; Acting: 9–18 September 2008
- Monarch: Bhumibol Adulyadej
- Deputy: See list: Chavalit Yongchaiyudh; Sompong Amornwiwat; Chavarat Charnvirakul; Olarn Chaipravat; Sanan Kachornprasart
- Preceded by: Samak Sundaravej
- Succeeded by: Chavarat Charnvirakul (acting); Abhisit Vejjajiva

Deputy Prime Minister of Thailand
- In office 6 February 2008 – 9 September 2008
- Prime Minister: Samak Sundaravej
Ministerial offices
Minister of Defence
In office 24 September 2008 – 2 December 2008
Prime Minister	himself
Preceded by	Samak Sundaravej
Succeeded by	Prawit Wongsuwan
Minister of Education
In office 6 February 2008 – 9 September 2008
Prime Minister	Samak Sundaravej
Preceded by	Wijit Srisa-arn
Succeeded by	Srimuang Chareonsiri

Leader of the People's Power Party Acting
- In office 30 September 2008 – 2 December 2008
- Preceded by: Samak Sundaravej
- Succeeded by: party dissolved Yongyuth Wichaidit (as Leader of the Pheu Thai Party; de facto)

Member of the House of Representatives
- In office 23 December 2007 – 2 December 2008
- Constituency: Party-list

Personal details
- Born: 31 August 1947 (age 79) Chawang, Nakhon Si Thammarat, Siam (now Chang Klang, Nakhon Si Thammarat, Thailand)
- Party: Pheu Thai (until 2024; since 2025)
- Spouse: Yaowapha Shinawatra
- Children: 3, including Yodchanan
- Relatives: Shinawatra family (by marriage)
- Education: Thammasat University; National Institute of Development Administration

Somchai Wongsawat (Thai: สมชาย วงศ์สวัสดิ์, (Note: In this Thai name, the person is referred to by his given name, Somchai, and not by his surname, Wongsawat.) pronounced [sǒm.tɕʰāːj wōŋ.sā.wàt]; born 31 August 1947) is a Thai politician who served as the 26th prime minister of Thailand in 2008. He is a former executive member of the People's Power Party (PPP) whose political rights were disenfranchised by the Constitutional Court for five years.

Prior to entering electoral politics, he had served civil service and judicial service, having been appointed Permanent Secretary of Justice (the highest non-elected position in the civil service) in 2000 by the government of Chuan Leekpai. Following his retirement from office in 2006 owing to the pensionable age, he entered politics after the 2006 coup unseating the government of his brother-in-law, Thaksin Shinawatra. He joined the PPP which won the December 2007 parliamentary elections, becoming Minister of Education and Senior Deputy Prime Minister. After the premiership of Samak Sundaravej had been terminated by the Constitutional Court for contravening the conflict of interests law, Somchai was successfully nominated Prime Minister. His government had to deal with the 2008 Thailand political crisis as well as the 2008 financial crisis, and the PPP was eventually dissolved by the Constitutional Court and its executive members, including Somchai, were prohibited from politics for five years for vote-buying committed by Yongyuth Tiyapairat.

== Family life ==
Somchai was born at Amphoe Chawang, Nakhon Si Thammarat Province, a son of Choem and Dap (Sutsai) Wongsawat. He is a brother-in-law of former prime minister Thaksin Shinawatra and former prime minister Yingluck Shinawatra, having married their sister Yaowapha. The couple have three children, Mr. Yodchanan Wongsawat, Ms. Chinnicha Wongsawat and Mrs. Chayapha Nam.

Somchai's wife Yaowapha previously served as an MP in the Thai Rak Thai Party led by her older brother, Thaksin Shinawatra. Like one hundred and ten other members of the party, she was banned from participating in politics for a five-year period by the order of the Constitutional Tribunal because of the party's violation of election laws.

== Education ==
Somchai completed his primary education in his home town, and his secondary education at Amnuay Silpa School in Bangkok. He received a bachelor of law from Faculty of Law, Thammasat University in 1970, becoming a barrister-at-law of the Thai Bar Association in the next three years. He achieved his master of Public Administration from the National Institute of Development Administration in 2002.

== Career ==
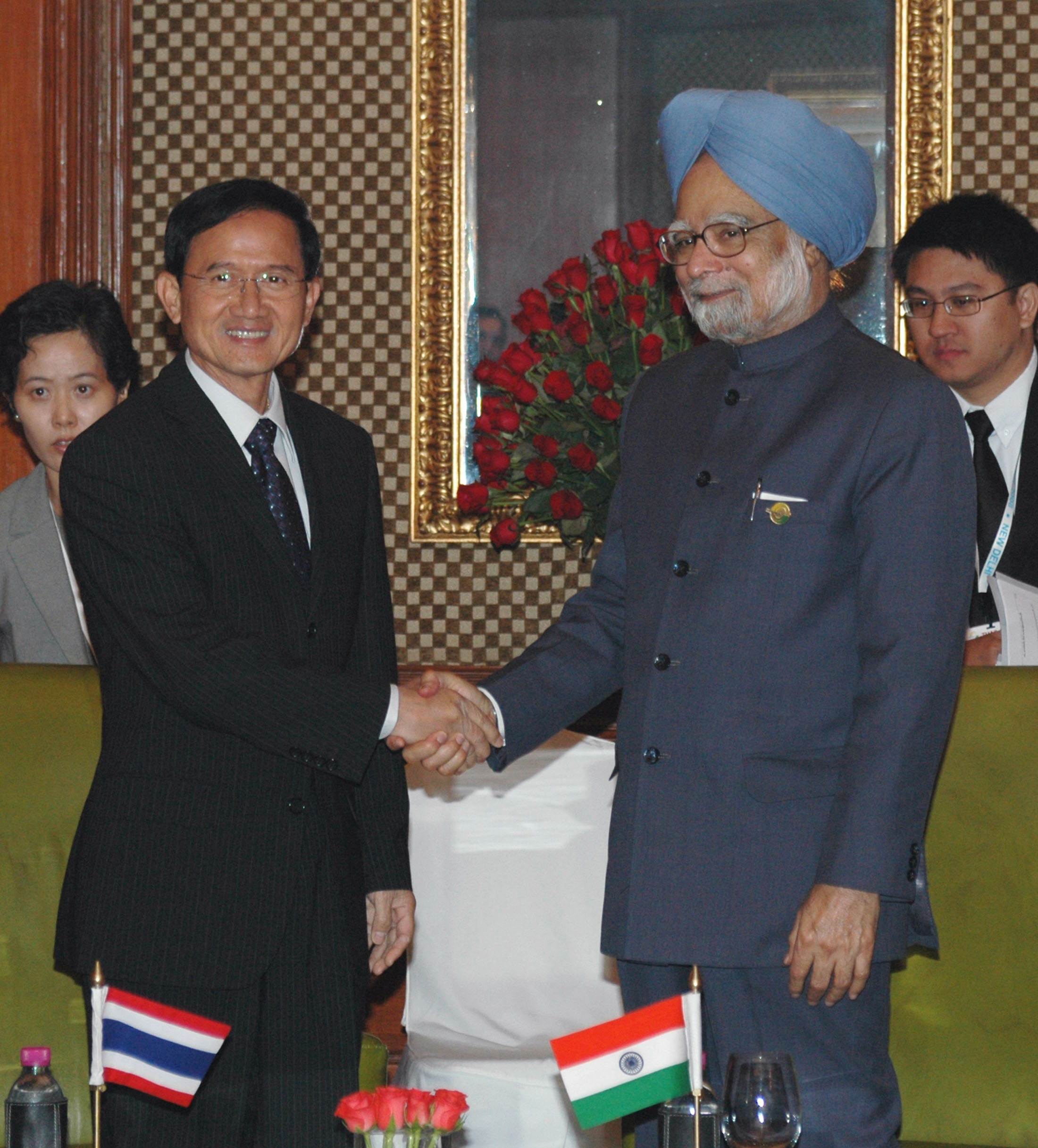
Somchai Wongsawat meeting Indian Prime Minister Manmohan Singh in New Delhi in 2008

=== Public service ===
Somchai has been appointed to various offices in the juridical service and the civil service, including inter alia: assistant judge of the Ministry of Justice in 1974, ministerial justice in the next year, justice of Chiang Mai's Provincial Court in 1976, justice of Chiang Mai in 1978, justice of Chiang Rai in 1983, chief of the Bench of Phang Nga's Provincial Court in 1986, chief of the Children and Juvenile Court of Rayong in 1987, chief of Chon Buri's Provincial Court in 1988 and of Nonthaburi's Provincial Court in the next year, and chief of the Bench of Thon Buri's Criminal Court in 1990, respectively. Somchai held office as judge of the 3rd Region's Appealate Court in 1993 and chief of the Bench of the 2nd Region's Appealate Court in 1997.

In 1998 Somchai was appointed the Deputy Permanent Secretary of Justice for Academic Affairs, and later for Administrative Affairs. He became the Permanent Secretary of Justice on 11 November 2000, and was transferred to become the Permanent Secretary of Labor from 8 March to 30 September 2006, the date he retired from the public service after reaching pensionable age.

Somchai has been since appointed inter alia chairperson of the law committee of the National Research Council of Thailand, member of the Thai Bar Association's committee, member of the Board of Thailand's Electricity Generation Authority, member of the Board of the Narcotics Prevention and Suppression Board, member of the Money Laundering Prevention and Suppression Board, member of the committee of the Council of State of Thailand, member of the Board of Policy of the National Thai Police, member of the Civil Service Board of Thailand, member of the Juridical Service Board of Thailand, and member of the National Official Information Board of Thailand.

=== Premiership (2008) ===
A member of the People Power Party, he was the deputy leader of the Party in 2007 and held office as the Minister of Education in the Next Year and Senior Deputy Prime Minister.

Somchai became the prime minister on 9 September 2008, upon the Constitutional Court's decision that the premiership of Samak Sundaravej had been terminated for his having worked as the emcee of two cooking shows while in office, in violation of the law forbidden government ministers from holding any other paid employment.

On 17 September 2008, Somchai was elected prime minister of the country by the National Assembly, receiving 298 favourable votes, more than the 163 votes for Abhisit Vejjajiva.

King Bhumibol Adulyadej issued a Royal Proclamation appointing Somchai as the 26th Prime Minister on 18 September 2008.

==== Siege ====
On 7 October 2008, anti-government protesters attempted to hold 320 parliamentarians and senators hostage inside the Parliament building, cutting off power. Somchai Wongsawat escaped by climbing a rear fence after his policy address. Other legislators were trapped inside. The 6-week sit-in and siege on the area next to the prime minister's office led the government to transfer its activities temporarily to Don Muang. Eventually, Somchai authorised the police to use force against the demonstrations. Thousands were injured, some seriously, and two protestors died, one a young woman; both were killed by exploding police gas grenades, which also maimed a number who lost limbs.

==== Investigation ====
On 29 September, Thailand's Election Commission spokesman Ruangrote Jomsueb said a subcommittee would investigate Somchai (30 days probe, to the Constitutional Court) per Senator Ruangkrai Leekijwattanaon's complaint on "whether Somchai violated the constitution by holding shares in Thailand's CS LoxInfo PCL, an Internet service provider that is a contract partner of CAT Telecom, a state-owned telecommunications service provider." The Thai constitution bars parliament members from holding shares in companies that do business with state enterprises, and if found guilty, Somchai would be disqualified as parliament member and ousted as prime minister.

=== Neglected duty and removal ===
On 17 October, Thailand's anti-corruption body found Prime Minister Somchai Wongsawat guilty of neglecting his duties while working in the justice department eight years ago. Members of the National Counter Corruption Commission said Somchai was wrong to suspend a corruption investigation into two senior officials while he was a permanent secretary at the justice ministry in 2000. The NCCC's investigation followed a complaint lodged by senior judge Chamnan Rawiwanpong after he petitioned for an investigation into alleged corruption involving a land sale in Pathum Thani province in 2000.

After the petition, Somchai set up a disciplinary panel, accusing Chamnan of serious wrongdoing and recommending he be fired, prompting Chamnan to make the counter-complaint.

== Somchai cabinet ==
This cabinet was active from 24 September 2008 – 20 December 2008.

Position	Name	Party
Prime minister and defense minister	Somchai Wongsawat	PPP
Deputy Prime Minister and Minister of Foreign Affairs	Sompong Amornwiwat	PPP
Deputy Prime Minister	Chaovarat Chanweerakul	PPP
Deputy Prime Minister	Olarn Chaiprawat	?
Deputy Prime Minister	Major General Sanan Kachornprasart	CTP
Minister for Office of the Prime Minister	Sukhumpong Ngonkham	PPP
Minister for Office of the Prime Minister	Suphol Fongngam	PPP
Minister of Finance	Suchart Thadathamrongvej	PTP
Deputy Minister of Finance	Pradit Pattaraprasit	RJTCP
Deputy Minister of Finance	Second Lieutenant Ranongrak Suwanchawi	PPD
Minister of Tourism and Sports	Weerasak Kowsurat	CTP
Minister of Social Development and Human Security	Udomdej Rattanasathien	PPP
Minister of Agriculture and Cooperatives	Somsak Prissanananthakul	CTP
Deputy Minister of Agriculture and Cooperatives	Sompat Kaewpichit	CTP
Deputy Minister of Agriculture and Cooperatives	Teerachai Saenkaew	PPP
Minister of Transport	Santi Promphat	PPP
Deputy Minister of Transport	Sopon Saram	PPP
Deputy Minister of Transport	Warawut Silpa-archa	CTP
Minister for Natural Resources and Environment	Anongwan Thepsuthin	MCMP
Minister of Information and Communication Technology	Man Pattanotai	PPD
Minister for Energy	Wannarat Channukul	RJCPP
Minister of Commerce	Chaiya Sasomsap	PPP
Deputy Minister of Commerce	Police Lieutenant Colonel Banyin Tangphakorn	MCMP
Deputy Minister of Commerce	Songkram Kitlertpairot	PPP
Minister of Interior	Police General Kowit Wattana	PPP
Deputy Minister of Interior	Pricha Rengsomboonsuk	PPP
Deputy Minister of Interior	Prasong Kositanon	PPD
Minister of Justice	Somsak Kiatsuranond	PPP
Minister of Labour	Uraiwan Thienthong	PRP
Minister of Culture	Worawat Eua-apinyakul	PPP
Minister for Science and Technology	Wutthipong Chaisang	PPP
Minister of Education	Srimuang Charoensiri	PPP
Minister of Public Health	Police Captain Chalerm Yubamrung	PPP
Deputy Minister of Public Health	Wicharn Meenchainan	PPP
Minister of Industry	Police General Pracha Promnok	PPD

== Notes ==
Political offices
Preceded by Kosit Panpiemras; Phaibun Wattanasiritham; Sonthi Boonyaratglin	Deputy Prime Minister of Thailand; 2008 with Mingkwan Saengsuwan; Surapong Suebwonglee; Sahas Bunditkul; Sanan Kachornprasart; Suwit Khunkitti; Kowit Wattana; Man Phatthanothai	Succeeded by Chavalit Yongchaiyudh; Sompong Amornwiwat; Chavarat Charnvirakul; Olarn Chaipravat; Sanan Kachornprasart
Preceded by Wijit Srisa-arn	Minister of Education of Thailand; 2008	Succeeded by Srimuang Charoensiri
Preceded by Samak Sundaravej	Prime Minister of Thailand; Acting : 2008; 2008	Vacant Chaovarat Chanweerakul (Acting) Title next held by Abhisit Vejjajiva
Vacant Title last held by Samak Sundaravej	Minister of Defence of Thailand; 2008	Vacant Title next held by Prawit Wongsuwan
Party political offices
Preceded by Samak Sundaravej	Leader of People's Power Party; 2008	Party dissolution
