= Prachai Leophai-ratana =

Prachai Leophai-ratana is a former Senator and a controversial Thai businessman who founded Thai Petrochemical Industry (TPI).

Prachai founded Thai Petrochemical Industry in 1978, based on companies his grandfather founded World War II. By 1994, it had become Southeast Asia's first fully integrated petrochemical company. TPI invested in a wharf and handling facilities on Thailand's eastern seaboard, built a 100-megawatt power plant, and even owned a cement company and opened its own gas stations. However, it never earned a profit and the majority of its debt was short-term and unhedged.

TPI suspended repayment of principal and interest on its US$3.2 billion in debt owed to 148 local and foreign creditors following the Asian Financial Crisis. TPI's creditors included International Finance Corporation, Citibank, and Bank of America. Prachai attempted to retain control of his companies in a manner that one foreign banker called, "hostile and belligerent." He accused Finance Minister Tarrin Nimmanahaeminda of conspiring with the International Monetary Fund against him and sued debt restructuring firm Ferrier Hodgson for embezzlement on the grounds that it is billing TPI for bodyguards for Ferrier Hodgson staff. Prachai refused to declare insolvent. The case continues to be one of Thailand's longest and most controversial bankruptcy cases.

An outspoken critic of Thaksin Shinawatra, Prachai was a major funder of the People's Alliance for Democracy and joined Snoh Thienthong's Pracharaj Party as its secretary-general prior to the coup that overthrew Thaksin's government.
