= 2007 Thai general election =

- 23 December 2007

All 480 seats in the House of Representatives 241 seats needed for a majority
- Registered: 44,002,593
- Turnout: 72.40% (▲7.63pp)
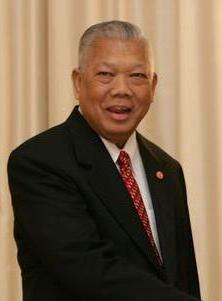

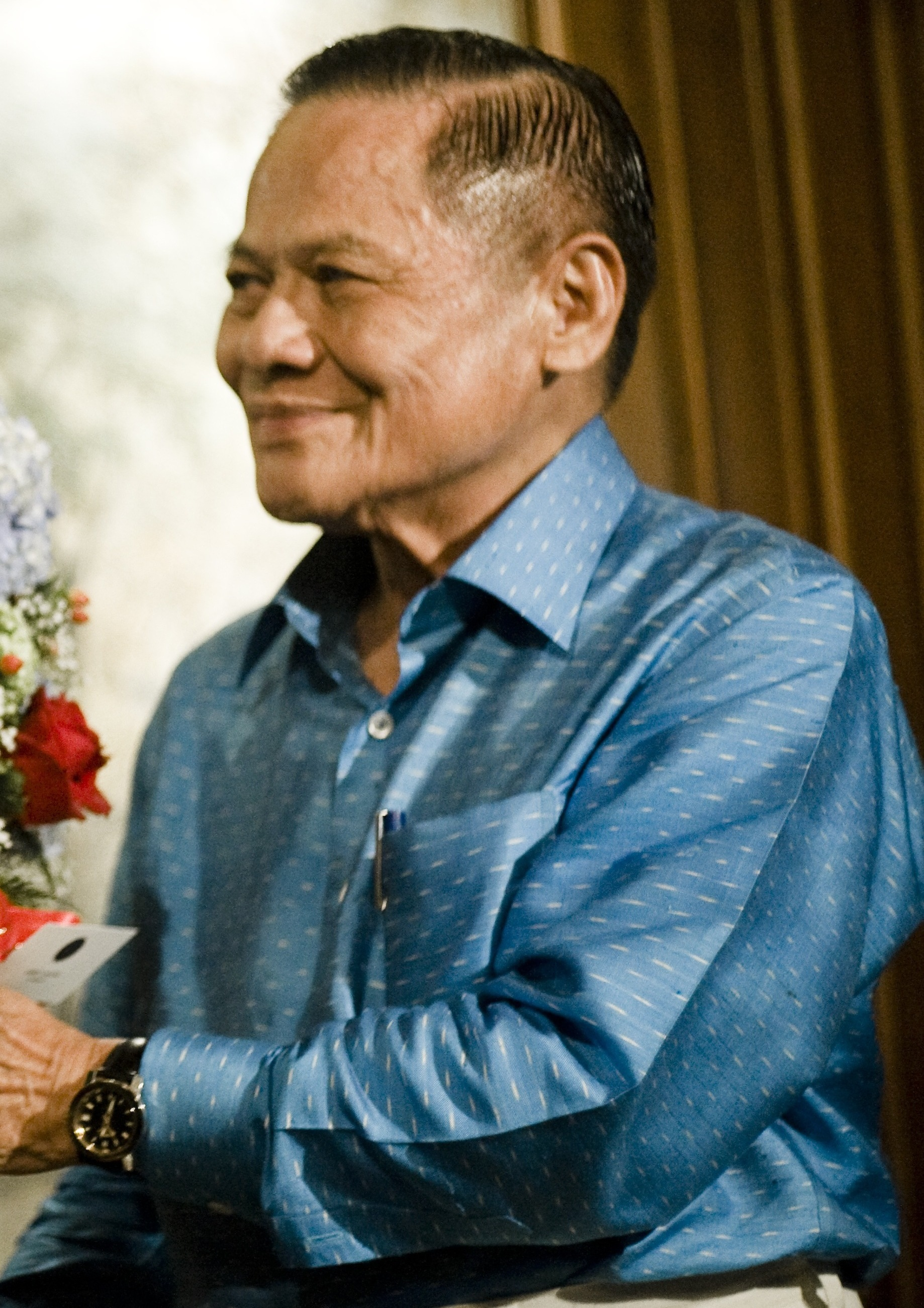

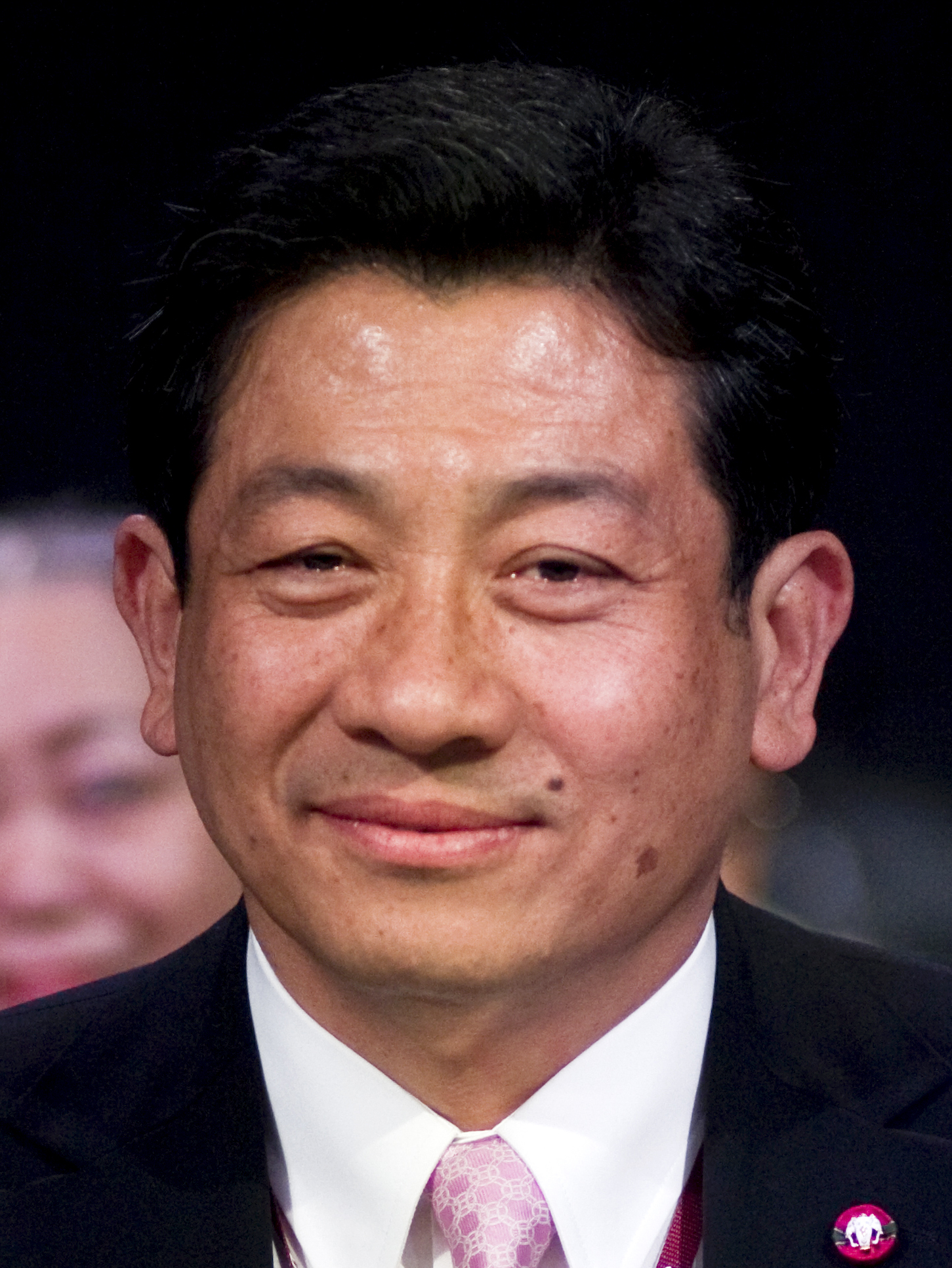
	First party	Second party	Third party
Leader	Samak Sundaravej	Abhisit Vejjajiva	Banharn Silpa-archa
Party	People's Power	Democrat	Chart Thai
Seats won	233	164	34
Constituency vote	26,971,230	22,128,334	6,486,553
% and swing	36.09%	29.61%	8.68%
Proportional vote	12,338,903	12,148,504	1,213,532
% and swing	39.84%	39.23%	3.92%
	Fourth party	Fifth party
		NDP
Leader	Suwit Khunkitti	Anongwan Thepsuthin
Party	Puea Pandin	Neutral Democratic
Seats won	24	12
Constituency vote	6,647,193	3,912,330
% and swing	8.89%	5.23%
Proportional vote	1,596,500	450,382
% and swing	5.16%	1.45%
- A map presenting the results of the election.
Prime Minister before election
Surayud Chulanont
Independent (CNS)
Prime Minister-designate
Samak Sundaravej
People's Power

General elections were held in Thailand on 23 December 2007. They were the first elections after the Council for National Security, a military junta, had overthrown Thailand's elected government and abrogated the constitution on 19 September 2006. The junta had canceled general elections scheduled for October 2006 and promised new elections within 12 months. The Constitutional Tribunal then outlawed the Thai Rak Thai party, the largest political party in Thailand, and banned TRT executives from contesting in the elections for five years. After their political party had been dissolved, the former TRT members regrouped under the band of People's Power Party (PPP) led by Samak Sundaravej, a seasoned politician. Following its formation, the junta issued a classified order to suppress the activities of the PPP and to frame it for lèse majesté. The order was leaked to the public, leading to a complaint towards the Election Commission from the PPP. However, the Election Commission dismissed the complaint on the grounds that the Council for National Security (CNS) had granted itself immunity in the 2007 Constitution of Thailand.

The junta deployed 200,000 soldiers and police officers to maintain security and 1,500 officers to supervise after election fraud. Charnchai Silapauaychai, a popular former Democrat Party member from Phrae who switched to the PPP for the 2008 election, was assassinated. Five men, one of them cousin of a powerful Democrat Party MP were arrested, but all denied involvement.

Despite being the junta's target for suppression, the PPP won 233 out of 480 parliamentary seats, close to controlling the majority in the House of Representatives. The Democrat Party came in a distant second with 165 seats, followed by Chart Thai with 37, For the Motherland with 24, Ruam Jai Thai Chat Pattana with 9, the Neutral Democratic Party with 7, and Pracharaj with 5.

== Timing ==
Although the junta initially scheduled the elections within 12 months after the September 2006 coup, Minister in the Prime Minister's Office Thirapat Serirangsan later announced that the elections might not occur until one year and five months, which would put the election in February or March 2008. On the other hand, the chairman of the Constitution Drafting Council, Noranit Sethabutr, said in January that the timetable was to hold a constitutional referendum in August and elections between October and December; any problems in drafting the constitution or ratifying it through the referendum would delay the election date. This timetable was later tightened even further, with elections planned by the end of September 2007. A preliminary date was set in March 2007 for the elections to be held on 16 December 2007 or 23 December 2007. After the constitutional referendum, it was announced that the most likely date would be 23 December, which was formally agreed upon on 27 August 2007.

== Electoral system ==
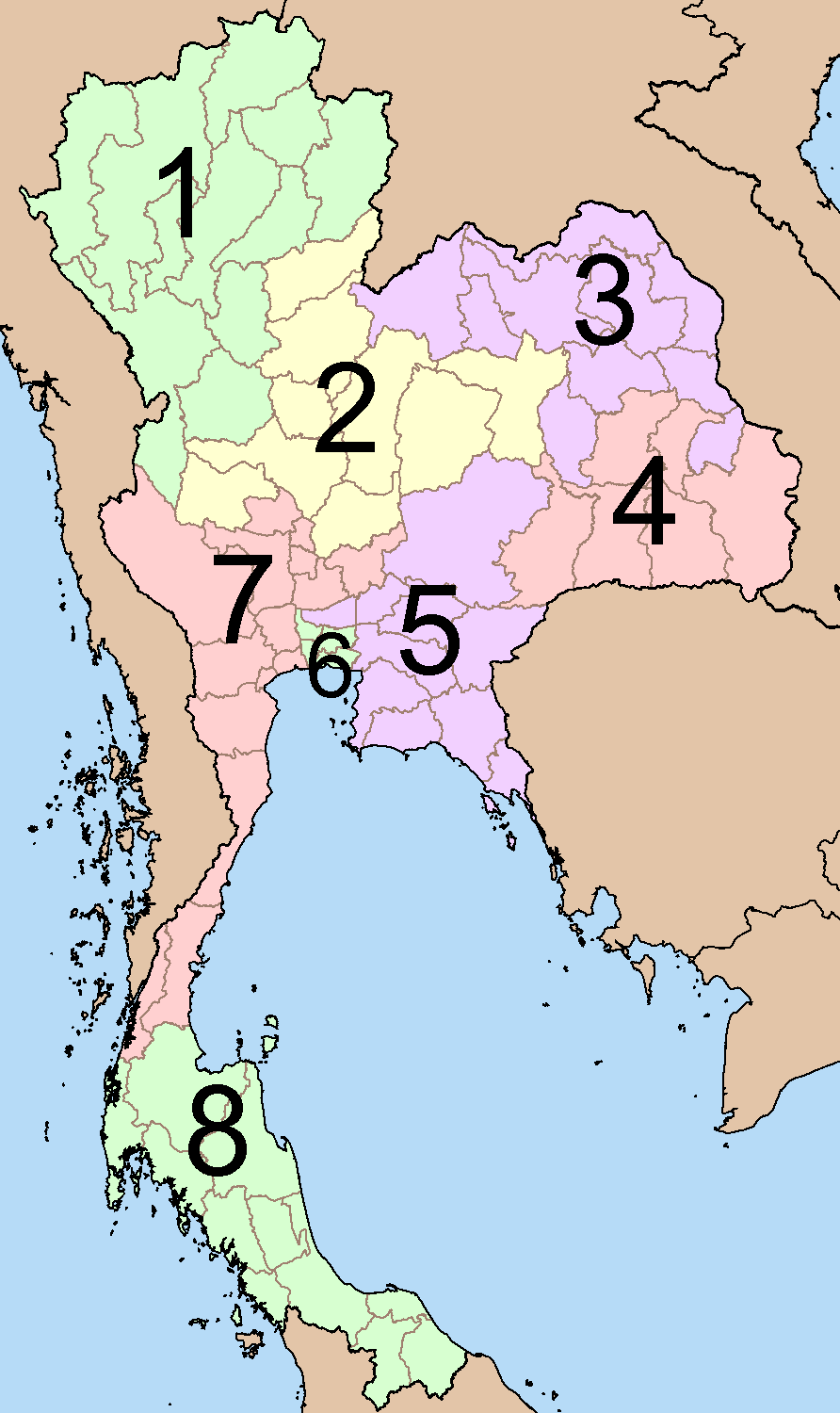
Map of electoral areas

With the new constitution the number of MPs was reduced to 480, with 400 elected directly by the 157 constituencies and 80 elected by proportional votes in each of the eight electoral areas. Depending on the size of the population, each constituency may have up to three MPs.

Early voting started on 15 December 2007.

The eight electoral areas were designed such that they contain equal numbers of population.

- Area 1: 11 provinces with 7,615,610 population - Chiang Mai, Chiang Rai, Mae Hong Son, Phayao, Nan, Lampang, Lamphun, Phrae, Sukhothai, Tak, and Kamphaeng Phet
- Area 2: 9 provinces with 7,897,563 population - Nakhon Sawan, Uthai Thani, Phetchabun, Phichit, Phitsanulok, Chaiyaphum, Khon Kaen, Lop Buri, and Uttaradit
- Area 3: 10 provinces with 7,959,163 population - Nong Khai, Udon Thani, Loei, Nakhon Phanom, Sakon Nakhon, Nong Bua Lamphu, Kalasin, Mukdahan, Maha Sarakham, and Amnat Charoen
- Area 4: 6 provinces with 7,992,434 population - Roi Et, Yasothon, Ubon Ratchathani, Si Sa Ket, Surin, and Buri Ram
- Area 5: 10 provinces with 7,818,710 population - Nakhon Ratchasima, Nakhon Nayok, Prachin Buri, Sa Kaeo, Chachoengsao, Chonburi, Rayong, Chanthaburi, Trat, and Pathum Thani
- Area 6: 3 provinces with 7,802,639 population - Bangkok, Nonthaburi, and Samut Prakan
- Area 7: 15 provinces with 7,800,965 population - Kanchanaburi, Suphan Buri, Nakhon Pathom, Ratchaburi, Phetchaburi, Prachuap Khiri Khan, Chumphon, Ranong, Chai Nat, Sing Buri, Ang Thong, Phra Nakhon Si Ayutthaya, Saraburi, Samut Sakhon, and Samut Songkhram
- Area 8: 12 provinces with 7,941,622 population - Surat Thani, Phang Nga, Nakhon Si Thammarat, Krabi, Phuket, Trang, Phatthalung, Satun, Songkhla, Pattani, Narathiwat, and Yala

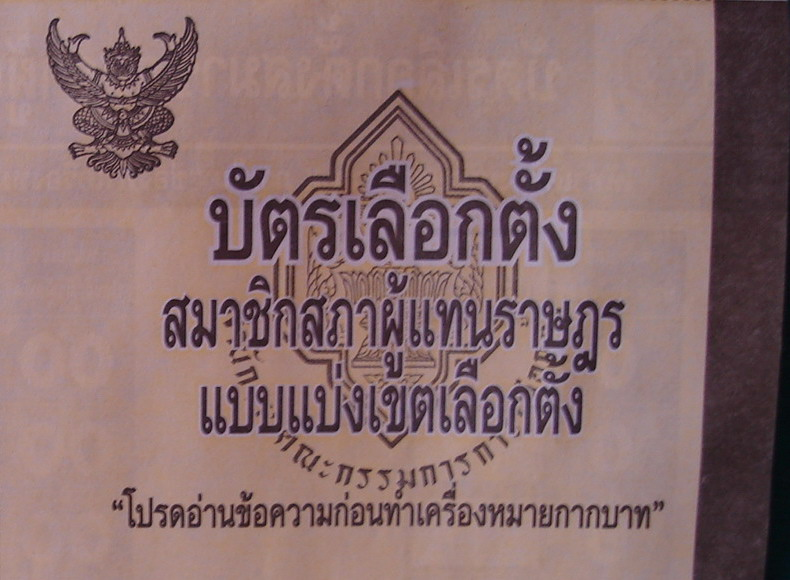
Constituency ballot

== Competing political parties ==
Some of the political parties contesting in this election, covering 157 constituencies and 80 party-list seats, are:

- People's Power Party (Phak Palang Prachachon) led by Samak Sundaravej.
- Democrat Party (Phak Prachatipat) led by Abhisit Vejjajiva.
- Thai Nation Party (Phak Chart Thai) led by Banharn Silpa-Archa.
- For the Motherland (Phak Pua Paendin) led by Suwit Khunkitti.
- Thais United National Development Party (Phak Ruam Jai Thai Chat Pattana) led by Chettha Thanajaro.
- Neutral Democratic Party (Phak Matchima Thippathai) led by Prachai Leophai-ratana.
- Royalist People's Party (Phak Pracha Raj) led by Sanoh Thienthong.

== Opinion polls ==
An opinion poll in late August saw the Democrat Party in the lead with 43.0%, followed by the People's Power Party with 20.7% and Thais United with 7.7%. A poll from November 2007 saw the PPP lead with 39%, followed by the Democrat Party with 32%, the Thai Nation Party with 10%, the Neutral Democratic Party with 9% and For the Motherland with 5%. However, another poll from late November saw the Democrat Party lead with 43% to the PPP's 24%.

== Results ==
Two exit polls gave the PPP a clear first place, with either 256 to the Democrats' 162 seats (giving them an absolute majority of the 480 seats) or with 202 to the Democrats' 146. Four smaller parties also took seats. While the Democrats acknowledged their election defeat and stated it was the PPP's right to form the government, it is unclear what the military will do now, as the PPP is based mostly on former TRT supporters.

The preliminary final results gave the PPP 226 seats, the Democrat Party 166 seats and Chart Thai 39 seats. For the Motherland got 26 seats, Ruam Jai Thai Chat Pattana 10, the Neutral Democratic Party 7 and Pracharat 4 seats.

According to final results, the PPP won 233 seats, the Democrat Party 165 seats and Chart Thai 37 seats. For the Motherland got 24 seats, Ruam Jai Thai Chat Pattana 9, the Neutral Democratic Party 7 and Pracharat 5 seats.

Party	Proportional			Constituency			Total seats
Party	Votes	%	Seats	Votes	%	Seats	Total seats
People's Power Party	12,338,903	39.84	34	26,971,230	36.09	199	233
Democrat Party	12,148,504	39.23	33	22,128,334	29.61	131	164
Puea Pandin Party	1,596,500	5.16	7	6,647,193	8.89	17	24
Thai Nation Party	1,213,532	3.92	4	6,486,553	8.68	30	34
Ruam Jai Thai Chart Pattana Party	740,461	2.39	1	3,482,904	4.66	8	9
Neutral Democratic Party	450,382	1.45	1	3,912,330	5.23	11	12
Pracharaj Party	408,851	1.32	0	1,675,205	2.24	4	4
Farmer Network of Thailand Party	180,575	0.58	0	204,191	0.27	0	0
New Aspiration Party	159,117	0.51	0	198,176	0.27	0	0
Thai Pen Thai Party	137,518	0.44	0	279,674	0.37	0	0
Thai Farmer Party	128,006	0.41	0	35,589	0.05	0	0
Prachamati Party	115,404	0.37	0	329,290	0.44	0	0
Rakmuangthai Party	88,918	0.29	0	31,403	0.04	0	0
Thai Rum Ruay Party	62,802	0.20	0	247,682	0.33	0	0
Farmer Force Party	61,503	0.20	0	33,034	0.04	0	0
Power Ground Party	43,040	0.14	0	20,419	0.03	0	0
Pattana Prachathippatai Party	40,633	0.13	0	21,366	0.03	0	0
Thai Citizen Party	28,163	0.09	0	292,297	0.39	0	0
Moral Party	28,027	0.09	0	10,970	0.01	0	0
Dumrongthai Party	11,477	0.04	0	25,276	0.03	0	0
Palang Pandin Thai Party	10,829	0.03	0	38,106	0.05	0	0
Chatsamuccee Party	6,961	0.02	0	12,653	0.02	0	0
Independent Party	6,904	0.02	0	27,338	0.04	0	0
Thai Law Jurisprudence Party	6,730	0.02	0	2,491	0.00	0	0
Ratsadonrakthai Party	5,297	0.02	0				–
Num Vidhi Party	5,124	0.02	0	12,339	0.02	0	0
Labour Party	4,323	0.01	0				–
Mahachon Party	2,248	0.01	0	11,428	0.02	0	0
Sangkomdhibataya Party	1,216	0.00	0				–
Yudi Misuk Party	973	0.00	0				–
Kirs Thai Maankong Party	577	0.00	0	2,933	0.00	0	0
Siam Santi Party				27,783	0.04	0	0
Voices of the People Party				21,670	0.03	0	0
Puen Kasetthai Party				9,890	0.01	0	0
Sri Siam Party				7,079	0.01	0	0
Kasikorn Thai Party				6,540	0.01	0	0
Prachachati Party				6,143	0.01	0	0
Powthai Party				5,730	0.01	0	0
Siam Party				4,415	0.01	0	0
Utopia Party				3,557	0.00	0	0
Rak Thai Party				3,180	0.00	0	0
Social Thai Party				1,661	0.00	0	0
Social Democratic Front Party				932	0.00	0	0
Blank votes	935,306	3.02	–	1,499,707	2.01	–	–
Total	30,968,804	100.00	80	74,738,691	100.00	400	480
Valid votes	30,033,504	94.28		30,438,386	97.32		
Invalid votes	1,823,436	5.72		837,775	2.68		
Total votes	31,856,940	100.00		31,276,161	100.00		
Registered voters/turnout	44,002,593	72.40		44,002,593	71.08		
Source: Election Commission

=== By province ===
Province	Total seats	Seats won						
Province	Total seats	PPP	Dem	TNP	PPD	RJTCP	NDP	PRP
Amnat Charoen	2	1	1					
Ang Thong	2			2				
Bangkok	36	9	27					
Buriram	10	9		1				
Chachoengsao	4	3			1			
Chai Nat	2			2				
Chaiyaphum	7	5		2				
Chanthaburi	3		3					
Chiang Mai	11	9			1	1		
Chiang Rai	8	8						
Chonburi	8		8					
Chumphon	3		3					
Kalasin	6	6						
Kamphaeng Phet	5	2	3					
Kanchanaburi	5	3	2					
Khon Kaen	11	11						
Krabi	3		3					
Lampang	5	5						
Lamphun	3	3						
Loei	4	4						
Lopburi	5	3	1	1				
Mae Hong Son	2	1	1					
Maha Sarakham	6	6						
Mukdahan	2				1	1		
Nakhon Nayok	2	1	1					
Nakhon Pathom	5	4		1				
Nakhon Phanom	4	3			1			
Nakhon Ratchasima	16	5			6	5		
Nakhon Sawan	7	1	2	2			1	1
Nakhon Si Thammarat	10		10					
Nan	3	3						
Narathiwat	5	1	1	2	1			
Nong Bua Lamphu	3	3						
Nong Khai	6	6						
Nonthaburi	6	4	2					
Pathum Thani	6	4		2				
Pattani	4		2		2			
Phang Nga	2		2					
Phatthalung	3		3					
Phayao	3	3						
Phetchabun	6	4	1	1				
Phetchaburi	3		3					
Phichit	4		1	2		1		
Phitsanulok	5	2	3					
Phra Nakhon Si Ayutthaya	5	4		1				
Phrae	3	3						
Phuket	2		2					
Prachinburi	3	2					1	
Prachuap Khiri Khan	3		3					
Ranong	1		1					
Ratchaburi	5	1	2	1			1	
Rayong	4		4					
Roi Et	8	7			1			
Sa Kaeo	3							3
Sakon Nakhon	7	7						
Samut Prakan	7	7						
Samut Sakhon	3	1	2					
Samut Songkhram	1		1					
Saraburi	4	2	2					
Satun	2		2					
Sing Buri	1			1				
Sisaket	9	7		1			1	
Songkhla	8		8					
Sukhothai	4		2	1			1	
Suphan Buri	5			5				
Surat Thani	6		6					
Surin	9	7					2	
Tak	3		3					
Trang	4		4					
Trat	1		1					
Ubon Ratchathani	11	4	3	3	1			
Udon Thani	10	10						
Uthai Thani	2			2				
Uttaradit	3	3						
Yala	3	1	2					
Yasothon	4	1	1		2			
Area 1	10	5	4		1			
Area 2	10	5	3	1	1			
Area 3	10	7	2		1			
Area 4	10	6	2	1	1			
Area 5	10	3	4		1	1		1
Area 6	10	4	5		1			
Area 7	10	3	5	2				
Area 8	10	1	8		1			
Total	480	233	165	37	24	9	7	5
Source: National Assembly

== Aftermath ==
=== Disqualifications ===
A number of MPs (mainly those elected for the PPP) were given so-called "red cards" for suspected vote-buying, meaning they will not be able to contest the resulting by-elections, while other MPs issued with "yellow cards" are not banned from contesting such by-elections. By 2008-01-03, the Election Commission had endorsed 397 MPs and was still investigating 83 MPs for fraud.

By-elections were held on 13 January, 17 January, 20 January (the day before the first session of the newly elected parliament) and 27 January 2008. The Electoral Commission was still looking into allegations of fraud by PPP deputy leader Yongyuth Tiyaphairat; if he is given a red card, the PPP faces dissolution. PPP officials have stated that they are not worried over the possible dissolution, and that they would simply find a new party instead; local reports state that a likely candidate for takeover by PPP members would be the Thai Land Power Party (Palang Pandin Thai Party).

Disqualified were:

- PPP
  - red cards for Prakit Poldej, Pornchai Srisuthiyothin, Rungroj Thongsri – Buri Ram Province Constituency 1
  - yellow cards for Boonlert Krudkhunthod, Linda Cherdchai, Prasert Jantararuangtong – Nakhon Ratchasima Province Constituency 3
  - yellow card for Thanatorn Losunthorn – Lampang Province Constituency 1
  - yellow cards for Surathin Phimarnmekhin, Anan Sriphan, Cherdchai Wichianwan – Udon Thani Province
  - yellow cards for Prasop Busarakham and one other MP, with Busarakham's card changed to red later – Udon Thani Province Constituency 3
- Thai Nation Party
  - red cards for two MPs – Chai Nat Province
- Democrat Party
  - yellow card for Suthat Jansaengsi – Phetchabun Province
- For the Motherland Party
  - yellow cards for two MPs

=== Government formation ===
In January 2008, a coalition government was announced bringing together the PPP and the five smallest parties. The Democrat Party became the sole opposition party.

== See also ==
- Elections in 2007
