= People's Power Party (Thailand) =

People's Power Party พรรคพลังประชาชน
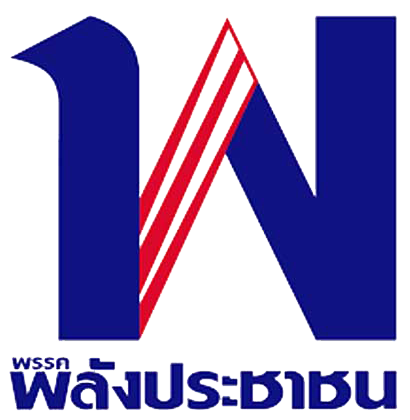
- Abbreviation: PPP
- Leader: Samak Sundaravej (2007–2008); Somchai Wongsawat (2008)
- Secretary-General: Surapong Subwonglee
- Founder: Garn Tienkaew
- Founded: 9 November 1998
- Dissolved: 2 December 2008
- Preceded by: Thai Rak Thai Party (de facto)
- Succeeded by: Pheu Thai Party (de facto)
- Ideology: Liberal conservatism; Neoliberalism; Populism; Thaksinomics
- Political position: Centre to centre-right
- Colors: Red, Blue, White

Website
- http://www.ppp.or.th/

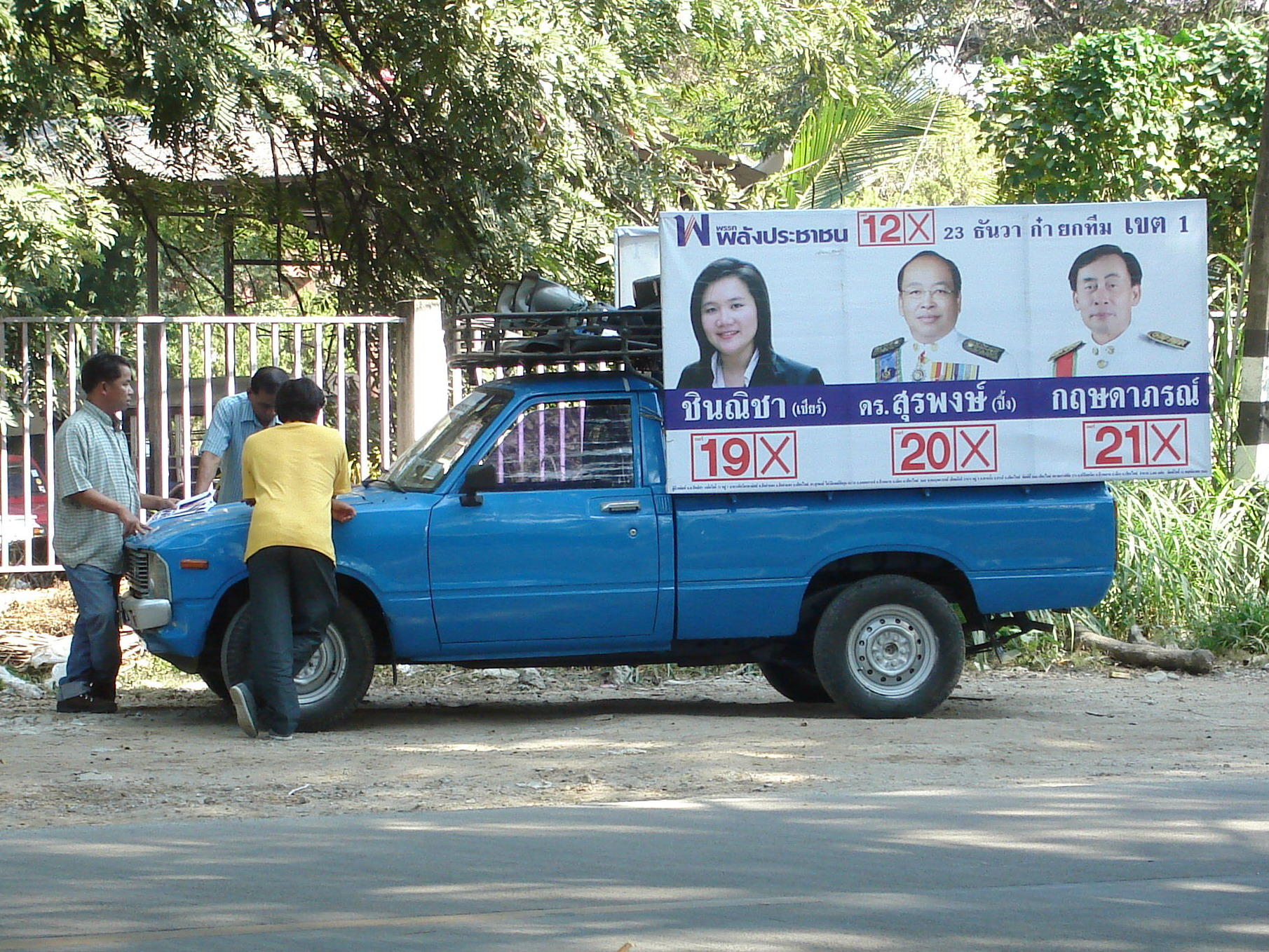
Canvassing car of the People's Power Party in Chiang Mai 2007

The People's Power Party (PPP; Thai: พรรคพลังประชาชน, RTGS: Phak Phalang Prachachon [pʰák pʰá.laŋ prà.t͡ɕʰaː.t͡ɕʰon]) was a Thai political party. The party leader was Somchai Wongsawat, the Party Secretary General was Surapong Suebwonglee, and the Party Spokesperson was Kuthep Saikrajarng. Most MPs of the party originally hailed from the Thai Rak Thai Party and thus the party was its de facto reincarnation with former prime minister Thaksin Shinawatra as its "leader." The PPP had a populist platform and was strong in the North, Central, and Northeastern regions of Thailand. The party became the leader of the coalition government after the junta-government supported 2007 general election. PAD, the leading anti-Thaksin movement, vowed to oppose it after the party decided to launch the amendment of the 2007 Constitution.

In December 2008, the party came under fire as its deputy chairman, Yongyuth Tiyapairat, faced charges of electoral fraud concerning the 2007 general election. These charges led to its dissolution by the verdict of the Constitutional Court in December 2008.

== History ==
The People's Power Party was founded on November 9, 1998 by Police Lieutenant Colonel Garn Tienkaew and existed as a minor party for some years, fielding a few candidates in the 2001, 2005 and 2006 elections. On 29 July 2007, some former Thai Rak Thai party (TRT) members, after the party was disbanded following a coup, agreed to contest the 2007 elections as candidates of the People's Power Party (PPP). This occurred after the Thai Rak Thai Party was dissolved by the Thai Supreme Court on May 30, 2007. It also follows the ban on participating in politics from 111 former TRT party politicians such as former leader Thaksin Shinawatra.

Former Bangkok governor Samak Sundaravej, who later declared himself as the 'nominee' of Thaksin Sinawatra, and former TRT Cabinet Minister Surapong Suebwonglee were elected People's Power Party leader and secretary general respectively on August 24, 2007.

After some former TRT members joined the PPP, the junta allegedly issued a classified order to suppress the activities of the Party. The order was leaked to the public, leading to a complaint to the Election Commission from the PPP.

The Electoral Commission had deployed 200,000 soldiers and police to maintain security and 1,500 officers to watch for election fraud during the December 23, 2007 general election. Charnchai Silapauaychai, a popular former Democrat Party member from Phrae who defected to the PPP for the 2008 election, was assassinated. Five men, one of them cousin of a powerful Democrat Party MP were arrested, but all of them denied involvement.

=== Impeachments and resignations ===
Samak Sundaravej's 5-month-old government was in great trouble on July 10, 2008, after Pattama, as the 3rd top official in the PPP resigned. Its deputy leader Yongyuth Tiyapairat was banned from politics for 5 years after the Supreme Court affirmed vote buying charges against him. Then, another prominent cadre, Chiya Sasomsub, was removed from office for illegally concealing his wife's assets.

The Constitutional Court ruled on July 8 that Foreign Minister Noppadon Pattama and the entire PPP cabinet violated its charter by failing to ask parliamentary approval for a bilateral agreement with Cambodia, signed by Noppadon in June to support Cambodia's bid to seek World Heritage status for Preah Vihear, an 11th-century Hindu temple. The Opposition filed a petition with deputy Senate Speaker Nikom Wairatpanit to impeach Noppadon over the issue of the temple. Sathit Wongnongtoei submitted 141 signatures of MPs. Noppadon was accused of violating Article 190 and 270 of the Constitution. The Opposition filed the motion of no confidence before Noppadon stepped down.

== Policies ==
The PPP's policies were continuations of the populist social welfare policies of the former Thai Rak Thai (TRT) government. The PPP has promised to offer amnesty for all banned TRT politicians including Thaksin Shinawatra, and to remove any charges against him. Thaksin Shinawatra and his family currently face multiple charges of corruption including telecommunications, property and family deals. TRT politicians also face charges of corruption in multiple state asset sales including PTT, the illegality of two-thirds of the number lotteries, and more recently a possible link between the bribery charges leveled against Thaksin who was formerly appointed governor of the Tourism Authority of Thailand by Governor Juthamas. Throughout the 2007 election campaign, the PPP members have faced charges that they engaged in vote buying, that former TRT members banned from politics have appeared in public to support the PPP, and that several illegal CDs have been distributed in rallies.

The PPP's primary voter bases were the former TRT strongholds of the North, Northeast, East and Central regions of Thailand. Since the early days of its rule, the party faced protests by opposition groups such as the anti-Thaksin People's Alliance for Democracy (PAD) and critics, due to its relation with Thaksin Shinawatra and constitutional amendment plans, allegedly aimed at granting amnesty to Thaksin and his former loyalists.

The Supreme Court heard a claim that the PPP is essentially a proxy of the banned political party Thai Rak Thai, and should thus be banned. The election commission investigated the results of 83 seats, and as a consequence three PPP candidates have been disqualified.

== Dissolution ==
Yongyuth Tiyapairat, the party's deputy chairman, was deemed guilty by a court verdict on electoral fraud. Along with the coalition members of Thai Nation Party and Neutral Democratic Party, the People's Power Party was dissolved by the Constitutional Court on December 2, 2008, with party executives stripped of their political rights for five years. The non-executive MPs of the parties were subsequently given 60 days to reorganize under new parties. MPs from the Thai Nation Party and Neutral Democratic Party announced that they would continue to support MPs from the PPP party in forming a new government. All non-executive party MPs and party members subsequently regrouped under the Pheu Thai Party.

== People's Power Party Speaker ==
Name	Portrait	Periods in Office	Election
Yongyuth Tiyapairat		24 January 2008 – 30 April 2008	2007 (23rd)
Chai Chidchob		15 May 2008	(23rd)

== People's Power Party Prime Ministers ==
Name	Portrait	Start Date	End Date	Election
Samak Sundaravej		29 January 2008	9 September 2008	2007 (23rd)
Somchai Wongsawat		18 September 2008	2 December 2008	— (23rd)

== General election results ==
Election	Total seats won	Total votes	Share of votes	Outcome of election	Election leader
2001	0 / 500	63,701	0.22%	0 seats; No representation in Parliament	Garn Tienkaew
2005	0 / 500	26,855	0.09%	0 seats; No representation in Parliament	Garn Tienkaew
2006	0 / 500	305,015	1.11%	0 seats; Nullified	Supaporn Tienkaew
2007	233 / 480	14,071,799	39.60%	▲76 seats; Governing coalition (PPP-CTP-PPD-others)	Samak Sundaravej

== Bibliography ==
- Baker, Chris; Pasuk, Phongpaichit (2009). Thaksin: The Business of Politics in Thailand (second expanded ed.). Silkworm Books. ISBN 978-974-9575-55-0.
