= Wannarat Channukul =

Thai physician and politician

Wannarat Channukul MPCh MWM
- วรรณรัตน์ ชาญนุกูล
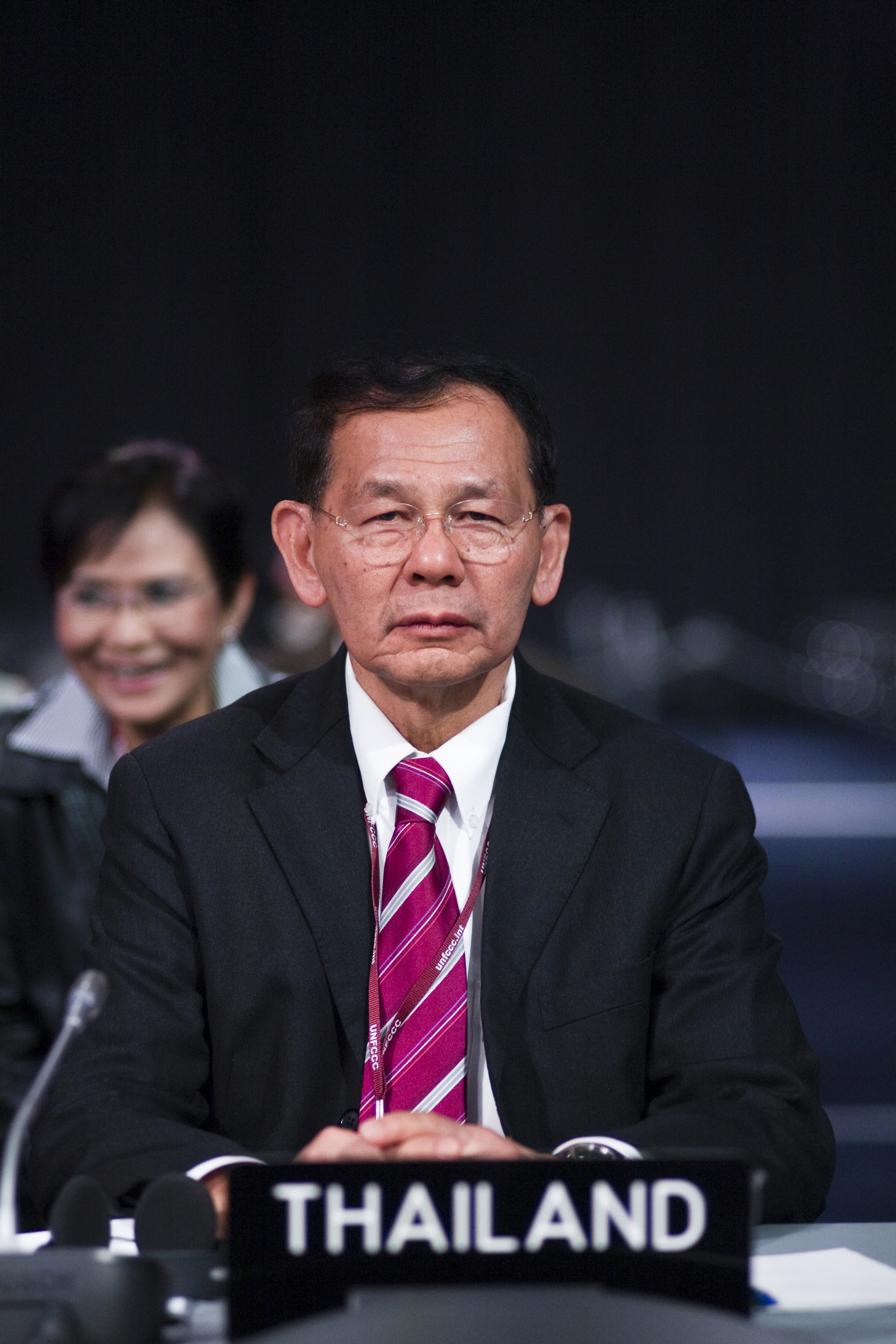
- Wannarat at Copenhagen Summit in 2009

Minister of Industry
- In office 9 August 2011 – 18 January 2012
- Prime Minister: Yingluck Shinawatra
- Preceded by: Chaiwuti Bannawat
- Succeeded by: Pongsavas Svasti

Minister of Energy
- In office 20 December 2008 – 9 August 2011
- Prime Minister: Abhisit Vejjajiva
- Succeeded by: Pichai Naripthaphan
- In office 24 September 2008 – 2 December 2008
- Prime Minister: Somchai Wongsawat
- Preceded by: Poonpirom Liptapanlop

Leader of the Chart Pattana Party
- In office 26 December 2008 – 21 November 2018
- Preceded by: Chettha Thanjaro
- Succeeded by: Tewan Liptapallop

Personal details
- Born: March 8, 1949 (age 77) Nakhon Ratchasima, Thailand
- Party: Chart Pattana Party; Thai Rak Thai (2004-07); Chart Pattana (1992-2004)
- Spouse: Temsiri Channukul
- Education: Chulalongkorn University; University of Hawaii
- Profession: Physician

Wannarat Channukul (Thai: วรรณรัตน์ ชาญนุกูล, RTGS: Wannarat Channukun; born 8 March 1949 in Nakhon Ratchasima) is a Thai physician and politician. He is the leader of the Chart Pattana Puea Pandin Party. From 2008 to 2011, he was Minister of Energy in the cabinet of Abhisit Vejjajiva. and from 2011 to 2012 Minister of Industry in the cabinet of Yingluck Shinawatra.

== Early life and education ==
Wannarat Channukul studied medicine at Chulalongkorn University, graduating with an MD, and law at Sukhothai Thammathirat Open University, graduating with an LLB. He continued his education at the University of Hawaii, receiving a Master of Public Health degree. Subsequently, he worked as a doctor at Maharaj Nakhon Ratchasima Hospital.

== Political careers ==
In 1992, Wannarat was elected to the parliament to represent Nakhon Ratchasima Province and the National Development Party. He was re-elected five times. From 2004 to 2007 he belonged to the Thai Rak Thai Party of Prime Minister Thaksin Shinawatra, until the government was overthrown by the military and the Constitutional Court banned the party. Wannarat's political faction merged with the Thais United party to form the Thais United National Development Party. He became Minister for Energy in Somchai Wongsawat's government for three months, until the minor parties broke their coalition with the People's Power Party and elected Abhisit Vejjajiva prime minister. Nevertheless, Wannarat stayed in office. Before the 2011 general election, he merged his United National Development Party with the Puea Pandin Party to form the Chart Pattana Puea Pandin Party, which he now chairs.

After the 2011 election, Wannarat Channukul led the party into coalition with the successful Pheu Thai Party and was appointed Minister of Industry in Yingluck Shinawatra's cabinet on 9 August 2011. In January 2012, he resigned for health reasons. In the 18 January cabinet reshuffle, he was replaced by MR Pongsavas Svasti.

== Personal life ==
Wannarat is married to Temsiri Channukul, who is a high school teacher, and the sister of Lt. Poonpirom Liptapanlop, Wannarat's predecessor as Minister of Energy. Poonpirom is married to Suwat Liptapanlop, who is a Chart Pattana Puea Pandin politician. Wannarat and Temsiri Channukul have one son.

== Royal decorations ==
Wannarat Channukul has been decorated with the special class of both the Order of the White Elephant and the Order of the Crown of Thailand.
