= Chart Pattana Party =

Chart Pattana Party may refer to:

- National Development Party (Thailand), a Thai political party 1992–2005
- Chart Pattana Party (2007), a Thai political party founded 2007
- Chart Thai Pattana Party, a Thai political party founded 2008
