= List of political parties in Thailand =

This list of political parties in Thailand names current and disbanded Thai political parties.

== Political parties ==
=== Parties represented in the National Assembly and/or other local legislations ===
Party	Abbr.	Leader	Ideology	MPs	BMC	PAO Chiefs
Bhumjaithai Party พรรคภูมิใจไทย	BJT ภท.	Anutin Charnvirakul	Conservatism; Populism	192 / 500	0 / 50	33 / 76 (including party affiliates)
People's Party พรรคประชาชน	PPLE ปชน.	Natthaphong Ruengpanyawut	Social democracy; Progressivism	120 / 500	22 / 50	1 / 76
Pheu Thai Party พรรคเพื่อไทย	PTP พท.	Julapun Amornvivat	Liberal conservatism; Populism	74 / 500	4 / 50 (including party affiliates)	26 / 76 (including party affiliates)
Kla Tham Party พรรคกล้าธรรม	KT กธ.	Narumon Pinyosinwat		58 / 500	0 / 50	5 / 76 (including party affiliates)
Democrat Party พรรคประชาธิปัตย์	DP ปชป.	Abhisit Vejjajiva	Classical liberalism; Liberal conservatism	22 / 500	8 / 50	4 / 76
Thai Ruam Palang Party พรรคไทรวมพลัง	TRL ทร.	Wasawat Puangphonsri	Populism	6 / 500	0 / 50	0 / 76
Palang Pracharath Party พรรคพลังประชารัฐ	PPRP พปชร.	Prawit Wongsuwon	Militarism; National conservatism	5 / 500	0 / 50	8 / 76
Prachachat Party พรรคประชาชาติ	PCC ปช.	Tawee Sodsong	Malay minority interests	5 / 500	0 / 50	2 / 76
Chart Pattana Party พรรคชาติพัฒนา	CPN ชทพ.	Tewan Liptapanlop	Populism	3 / 500	0 / 50	0 / 76
Economic Party พรรคเศรษฐกิจ	EP ศก.	Rangsi Kitiyanathap	Libertarianism	3 / 500	0 / 50	0 / 76
Thai Sang Thai Party พรรคไทยสร้างไทย	TSTP ทสท.	Sudarat Keyuraphan	Progressive conservatism; Neoliberalism	2 / 500	0 / 50	0 / 76
United Thai Nation Party พรรครวมไทยสร้างชาติ	UTN รทสช.	Pirapan Salirathavibhaga	Ultraconservatism; Militarism	2 / 500	0 / 50	6 / 76 (including party affiliates)
Fair Party พรรคเป็นธรรม	FP ปธ.	Pitipong Temcharoen	Social democracy; Multiculturalism	2 / 500	0 / 50	0 / 76
New Democracy Party พรรคประชาธิปไตยใหม่	NDP ปธม.	Surathin Phichan	Social democracy	1 / 500	0 / 50	0 / 76
Thai Liberal Party พรรคเสรีรวมไทย	TLP สร.	Sereepisuth Temeeyaves	Progressive conservatism	1 / 500	0 / 50	0 / 76
Thai Progress Party พรรคไทยก้าวหน้า	TPG ทกน.	Watcharaphon Busamongkol	Social democracy	1 / 500	0 / 50	0 / 76
Chart Thai Pattana Party พรรคชาติไทยพัฒนา	CTPP ชทพ.	Varawut Silpa-archa	Conservatism	0 / 500	0 / 50	0 / 76

=== Parties not represented in parliament ===
- New Politics Party
- New Aspiration Party, majority merged with the Thai Rak Thai Party in 2001, minority continue to be used
- Thai Citizen Party

== New political parties founded after the 2014 military coup ==
- ~~Future Forward Party~~ – dissolved by the Constitutional Court of Thailand on 21 August 2020
- Palang Pracharath Party
- Thai Civilized Party
- ~~Move Forward Party~~ – dissolved by the Constitutional Court of Thailand on 7 August 2024

== Defunct parties ==
- Khana Ratsadon (existed from 1927 to the 1940s) – first political party in Thailand
- Liberal Democratic Party (disbanded in 1958)
- Socialist Party of Thailand (most members joined the communists in 1976 and the party was disbanded)
- Social Justice Party
- Justice Unity Party
- Palang Dharma Party (disbanded in 1996)
- Both of the following parties merged into Thais United National Development Party (Phak Ruam Jai Thai Chat Pattana) in 2007:
  - National Development Party (Phak Chat Pattana; founded in 1992)
  - Thais United (Ruam Jai Thai; founded in 2007)
- New Force Party (disbanded in 1988)
- Thai Pen Thai Party (Thais are Free Party) (disbanded in 2016)
- Social Action Party (disbanded in 2018)
- Thai Social Democratic Party

=== Banned or dissolved parties ===
Parties dissolved by the Constitutional Court of Thailand and barred from political activity:

- Communist Party of Thailand (existed from 1942 to the 1980s)
- Thai Rak Thai Party (Phak Thai Rak Thai) – dissolved by the Constitutional Court of Thailand on 30 May 2007 for violating electoral laws
- People's Power Party (Phak Palang Prachachon) – dissolved by the Constitutional Court of Thailand on 2 December 2008 for violating electoral laws
- Thai Nation Party (Phak Chart Thai) – dissolved by the Constitutional Court of Thailand on 2 December 2008 for violating electoral laws
- Neutral Democratic Party (Phak Matchima) – founded in 2006, dissolved by the Constitutional Court of Thailand on 2 December 2008 for violating electoral laws
- Thai Raksa Chart Party (Phak Thai Raksa Chart) – founded in 2009, dissolved by the Constitutional Court of Thailand on 7 March 2019 for violating electoral laws
- Future Forward Party (Abrv: FFP; Thai: พรรคอนาคตใหม่, RTGS: phak anakhot mai) The party was dissolved on 21 February 2020 for fiscal impropriety.
- Move Forward Party (Thai: พรรคก้าวไกล, RTGS: Phak Kao Klai) – founded in 2014, dissolved by the Constitutional Court of Thailand on 7 August 2024

== See also ==
- Politics of Thailand
- List of political parties by country
