= Suwat Liptapanlop =

Thai politician

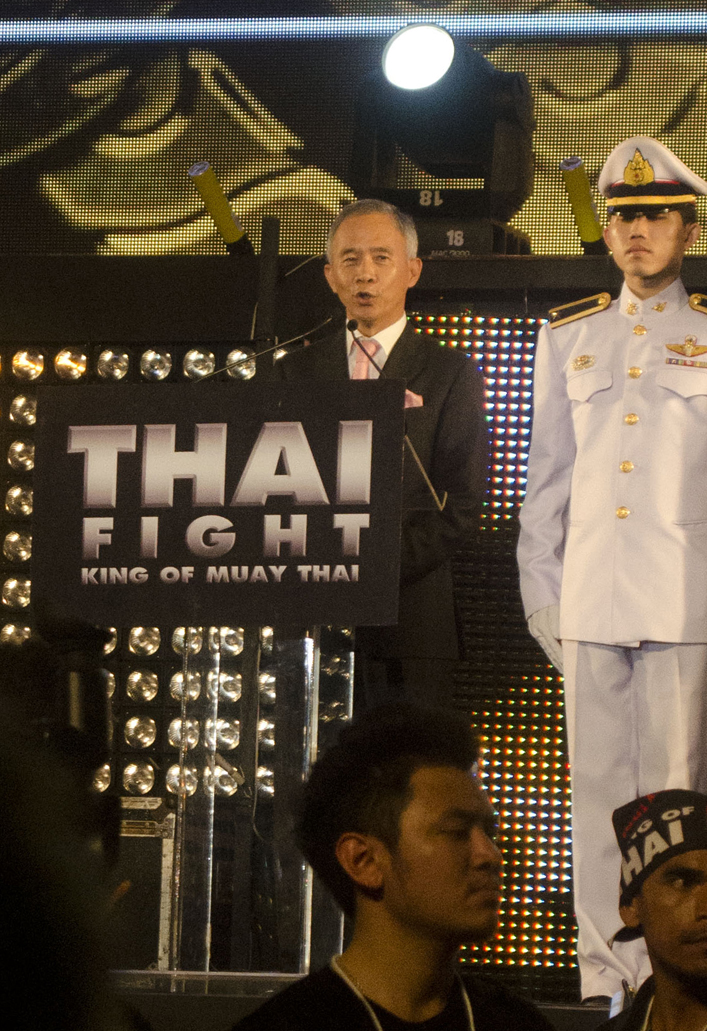
Suwat Liptapanlop at THAI FIGHT 2012 final

Suwat Liptapanlop (Thai: สุวัจน์ ลิปตพัลลภ, RTGS: Suwat Liptaphanlop, IPA: [sù.wát líp.tà.pʰan.lóp]; born 9 February 1955 in Ratchaburi Province) is a Thai entrepreneur, politician and sports official based in Nakhon Ratchasima. He has held different cabinet posts in several governments since 1988, including deputy prime minister, and is the de facto leader of the Chart Pattana Party while his brother Tewan Liptapallop serves as its official leader.

== Family and education ==
Suwat Liptapanlop's parents were traders of Chinese descent. They sold on a floating market in Ratchaburi Province. Later, the family moved to Bangkok, became involved in the transportation of construction material and then founded their own construction business. Suwat's father was an associate of General Arthit Kamlang-ek, from 1982 to 1986 commander-in-chief of the Thai army. He provided the Liptapanlops' company with military construction contracts. Most of the projects were in the province of Nakhon Ratchasima (Khorat), so the company and family that were responsible for building infrastructure and hospitals won considerable influence there.

Suwat Liptapanlop holds a Bachelor of Science in Civil Engineering from Kasetsart University in Bangkok and a Master of Science from Purdue University in the US state of Indiana. After returning to Thailand, he worked as a project manager in an engineering company.

== Political career ==
In 1988, he entered politics as a member of General Arthit's Thai People's Party. In his Nakhon Ratchasima constituency, he could even defeat prime minister-to-be Chatichai Choonhavan. Nevertheless, the Thai People's Party joined Chatichai's government coalition and Suwat was made deputy minister of communication and transport. After the 1991 coup d'état, the military junta (National Peace Keeping Council) appointed him to their legislative assembly. In March 1992 he ran for the Justice Unity Party, but before the snap election in September of the same year, he defected to the National Development Party. He became the secretary-general and main financial backer of this party. Also in 1992, the government provided Suwat's firm with a lucrative contract to upgrade the "Friendship Highway".

From 1994 to 1995, he was Minister of Science under Chuan Leekpai, from 1996 to 1997 Minister of Transport under Chavalit Yongchaiyudh, and from 1998 to 2000 Minister of Industry in the second government of Chuan Leekpai. In the cabinet of Thaksin Shinawatra, Suwat was Minister to the Office of the Prime Minister and Minister of University Affairs from March to October 2002, subsequently Minister of Labour until November 2003. In 2003, he replaced Korn Dabbaransi as chairman of the shortly oppositional National Development Party. After re-joining the government, he was Deputy Prime Minister from June 2004 to March 2005. Then, he joined Thaksin's Thai Rak Thai Party and served as Minister of Justice until August 2005, and then again Deputy Prime Minister until September 2006.

When the Supreme Tribunal dissolved the Thai Rak Thai Party in 2007, it banned its 111 party executives, including Suwat, from politics for five years. Therefore, he does not hold a party office in the 2007-established Ruam Chart Pattana Party (Chart Pattana after a renaming in 2011), but acts as its "chief adviser" and de facto leader. The official chairman is his brother-in-law Wannarat Channukul. Suwat's wife, Lt Gen Poonpirom Liptapanlop, served as Minister of Energy in 2008.

== Activities ==
In 2009, Suwat Liptapanlop was elected vice president of the National Olympic Committee of Thailand for a four-year term. Moreover, he is the president of the Lawn Tennis Association of Thailand and a member of the board of directors of the International Tennis Federation for the period 2011-13. He was the president of the local organising committee for the 2012 FIFA Futsal World Cup in Thailand.

Since 2011, Liptapanlop has served on the Leadership Council for Concordia, a nonpartisan, nonprofit based in New York City focused on promoting effective public-private collaboration to create a more prosperous and sustainable future.

== Eponyms ==
=== Paleontology ===
In honour of Mr. Suwat Liptapanlop's support and promotion of the work done by the Northeastern Research Institute of Petrified Wood and Mineral Resources, a newly discovered carcharodontosaurid theropod dinosaur, Siamraptor suwati, was named after him. Siamraptor is the best preserved carcharodontosaurian theropod in Southeast Asia, and it sheds new light on the early evolutionary history of Carcharodontosauria.
