= Abhisit cabinet =

Government of Thailand from 2008 to 2011

Abhisit Cabinet
- 59th Council of Ministers of Thailand
- 2008–2011
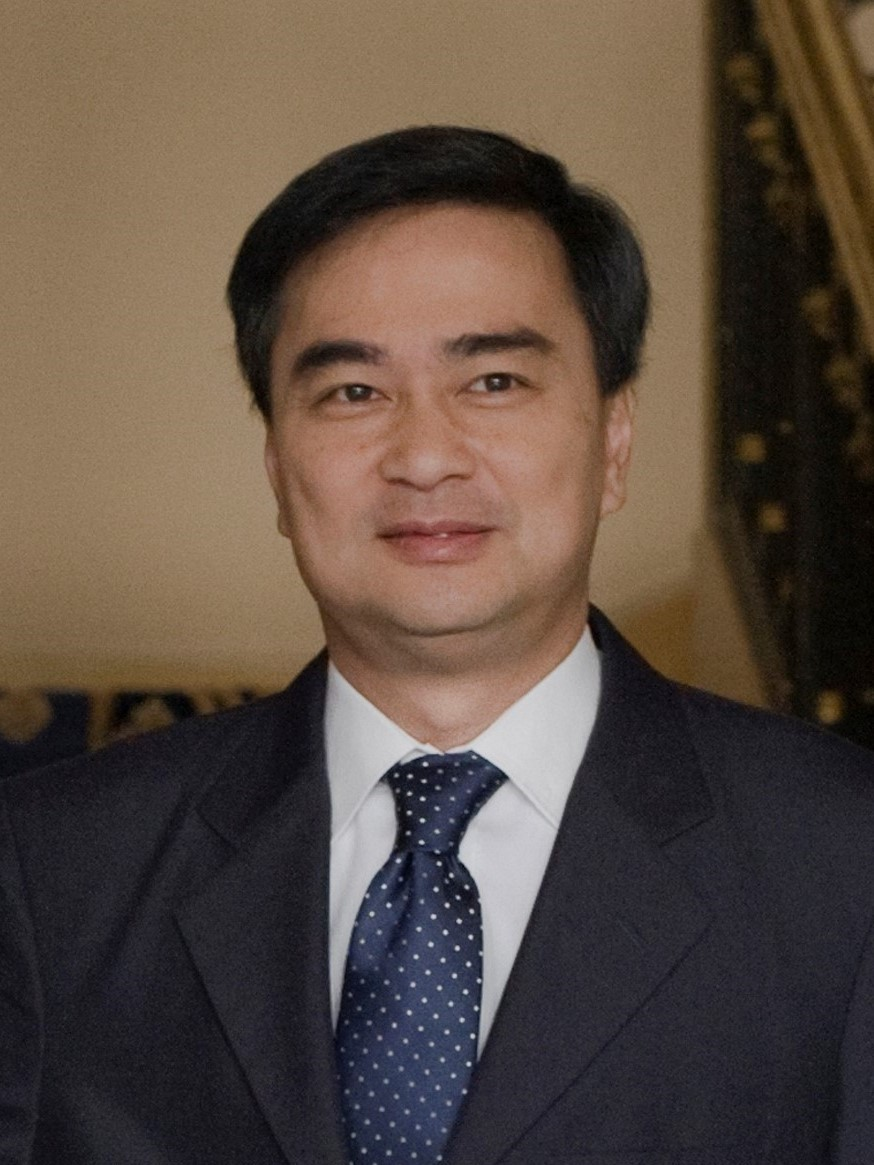
- Date formed: 20 December 2008
- Date dissolved: 9 August 2011

People and organisations
- Monarch: Bhumibol Adulyadej
- Prime Minister: Abhisit Vejjajiva
- Prime Minister's history: 2008–2011
- Deputy Prime Ministers: First appointment (20 December 2008): Suthep Thaugsuban (until 8 October 2010); Kobsak Sabhavasu (until 11 January 2010); Sanan Kachornprasart; Second appointment (15 January 2010): Trairong Suwankiri; Third appointment (15 November 2010): Suthep Thaugsuban
- No. of ministers: 34
- Total no. of members: 47
- Member party: Democrat Party; Bhumjaithai Party; Chartthaipattana Party; Puea Pandin Party (partial); Chart Pattana Party; Social Action Party; Matubhum Party
- Status in legislature: Coalition government
- Opposition party: Pheu Thai Party; Pracharaj Party; Puea Pandin Party (partial)
- Opposition leader: Chalerm Yubamrung (Acting)

History
- Legislature term: HoR 23rd: 2007–2011
- Budgets: 2010 budget; 2011 budget
- Predecessor: Somchai cabinet
- Successor: Yingluck cabinet

The Abhisit Cabinet (Council of Ministers) or formally the 59th Council of Ministers (คณะรัฐมนตรี คณะที่ 59) was announced after the appointment of Abhisit Vejjajiva as Prime Minister of Thailand on the 17 December 2008. The Cabinet line-up itself was announced on the 20 December, to the news media. The Cabinet was formally sworn in by King Bhumibol Adulyadej on the 22 December at the Klai Kangwon Villa in Hua Hin.

== Election of the prime minister ==
15 December 2008; Nomination of Abhisit Vejjajiva (Dem) and Pracha Promnok (PPP) as Prime Minister; Absolute majority: 219/438
Vote	Parties	Votes
Abhisit Vejjajiva	Democrat Party (163), Friends of Newin Group (22), Chart Thai Pattana Party (14), Puea Pandin Party (12), Bhumjaithai Party (8), Ruam Jai Thai Chart Pattana Party (5), Others (11)	235 / 438
Pracha Promnok	Pheu Thai Party (178), Puea Pandin Party (9), Thai Liberal Party (10), Pracharaj Party (5), Bhumjaithai Party (3), Ruam Jai Thai Chart Pattana Party (2), Chart Thai Pattana Party (1)	198 / 438
Abstain	Democrat Party (1), Ruam Jai Thai Chart Pattana Party (1)	2 / 438
Not voting	Democrat Party (1), Friends of Newin Group (1), Ruam Jai Thai Chart Pattana Party (1)	3 / 438

Cabinet of Thailand
Position	Name	Party
Prime Minister	Abhisit Vejjajiva	DEM
Deputy Prime Minister	Suthep Thaugsuban	DEM
Deputy Prime Minister	Dr. Trairong Suwankiri	DEM
Deputy Prime Minister	Major General Sanan Kachornprasart	CTP
Minister for Office of the Prime Minister	Satit Wongnongtaey	DEM
Minister for Office of the Prime Minister	Ongart Klampaiboon	DEM
Minister of Defence	General Prawit Wongsuwan	–
Minister of Finance	Korn Chatikavanij	DEM
Deputy Minister of Finance	Pradit Pataraprasit	RC
Deputy Minister of Finance	Dr. Mun Pattanothai	MP
Minister of Foreign Affairs	Kasit Piromya	DEM
Minister of Tourism and Sports	Chumpol Silpa-archa	CTP
Minister for Social Development and Human Security	Issara Somchai	DEM
Minister of Agriculture and Cooperatives	Theera Wongsamut	CTP
Deputy Minister of Agriculture and Cooperatives	Suphachai Phosu	BJT
Minister of Transport	Sophon Saram	BJT
Deputy Minister of Transport	Kuakul Danchaiwijit	CTP
Deputy Minister of Transport	Suchart Chockchaiwattanakorn	BJT
Minister for Natural Resource and Environment	Suwit Khunkitti	SAP
Minister of Information and Communication Technology	Juti Krairerk	DEM
Minister for Energy	Dr. Wannarat Channukul	RC
Minister of Commerce	Pornthiva Nakasai	BJT
Deputy Minister of Commerce	Alongkorn Pollabutr	DEM
Minister of Interior	Chaovarat Chanweerakul	BJT
Deputy Minister of Interior	Boonjong Wongtrairat	BJT
Deputy Minister of Interior	Thaworn Senniam	DEM
Minister of Justice	Pirapan Salirathavibhaga	DEM
Minister of Labour	Chalermchai Sri-on	DEM
Minister of Culture	Niphit Intharasombat	DEM
Minister for Science and Technology	Dr. Virachai Virameteekul	DEM
Minister of Education	Chinnaworn Boonyakiat	DEM
Deputy Minister of Education	Chaiyot Jiramaetagron	PPD
Deputy Minister of Education	Narisara Chawaltanpithak	PPD
Minister of Public Health	Jurin Laksanawisit	DEM
Deputy Minister of Public Health	Pansiri Kulanartsiri	BJT
Minister of Industry	Chaiwuti Bannawat	DEM

== See also ==
- Premiership of Abhisit Vejjajiva
