= Trairong Suwankiri =

Thai politician (born 1944)

Trairong Suwankiri MPCh MWM
- ไตรรงค์ สุวรรณคีรี
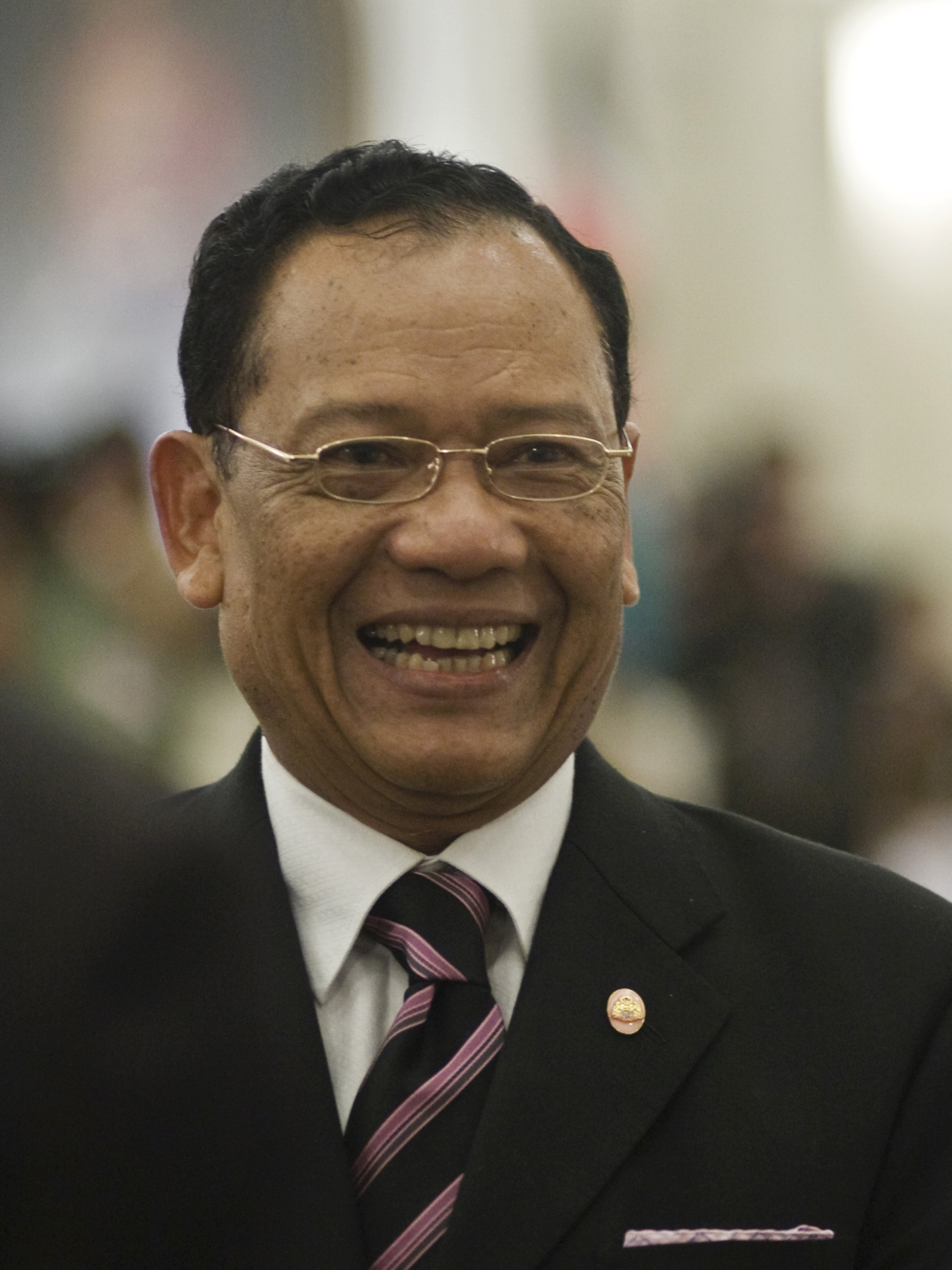
- Trairong in 2010

Deputy Prime Minister of Thailand
- In office 15 January 2010 – 9 August 2011
- Prime Minister: Abhisit Vejjajiva
- In office 9 July 1999 – 9 November 2000
- Prime Minister: Chuan Leekpai

Minister of Labour and Social Services
- In office 14 November 1997 – 4 October 1998
- Prime Minister: Chuan Leekpai
- Preceded by: Montri Dan-paiboon
- Succeeded by: Sompong Amornwiwat

Minister of Industry
- In office 29 September 1992 – 13 July 1995
- Prime Minister: Chuan Leekpai
- Preceded by: Sanan Kachornprasart
- Succeeded by: Chaiwat Sinsuwong

Personal details
- Born: 24 June 1944 (age 82) Cha Thing Phra, Sathing Phra, Songkhla, Thailand
- Party: United Thai Nation (2022–present)
- Other political affiliations: Democrat (1984–2022)
- Spouse: Nut Suwankiri
- Education: Thammasat University; University of Hawaiʻi (Ph.D.)
- Profession: Politician; university lecturer; economist

Trairong Suwankiri (Thai: ไตรรงค์ สุวรรณคีรี, RTGS: Trairong Suwankhiri; born 24 June 1944) is a Thai politician. Member of United Thai Nation Party. He was deputy prime minister in the cabinet of Abhisit Vejjajiva, and vice leader of the Democrats. His name, Trairong means tricolour and is the name of the Thai national flag. In parliament and public he is known for his jokes and his heavy Southern accent.

== Educations ==
Trairong graduated with a bachelor's degree in economics from Thammasat University in 1967. Trairong holds a master's degree and a Doctoral degree in Economics of the University of Hawaiʻi.

== Careers ==
Trairong Suwankiri has started his career as private secretary to Professor Puey Ungpakorn, at this time prominent rector of the Thammasat University. In this function he had to witness the Thammasat University massacre of 6 October 1976.

In 1986 Trairong was for the first time elected to the House of Representatives on the Democrat Party list. Prime Minister Prem Tinsulanonda appointed him government spokesman. From 1988 to 1991 he was deputy minister of Interior in the administration of Chatichai Choonhavan and from 1992 to 1994 deputy minister of Finance under the first premiership of Chuan Leekpai.

He has served as Minister of Industry from 1994 to 1995 in Chuan's first, Minister of Labour from 1997 to 1998 and Deputy Prime Minister in 1999, in his second cabinet. 2005 he was elected vice president of the Democrat Party. From 15 January 2010 to 9 August 2011, he was one of three deputy prime ministers under Abhisit Vejjajiva and in charge of economic affairs.

On 27 October 2022, Trairong resigned from the Democrat Party after 38 years as a party member. It is currently speculated he may join the newly formed Ruam Thai Sang Chart, formed by supporters of Prime Minister Prayut Chan-o-cha for the 2023 Thai general election.

== Royal decorations ==
Trairong Suwankiri is decorated with the highest class (Knight Grand Cordon) of both the Order of the White Elephant and the Order of the Crown of Thailand.

== Academic rank ==
- Assistant Professor
