= Anucha Nakasai =

Thai politician (born 1960)

- อนุชา นาคาศัย
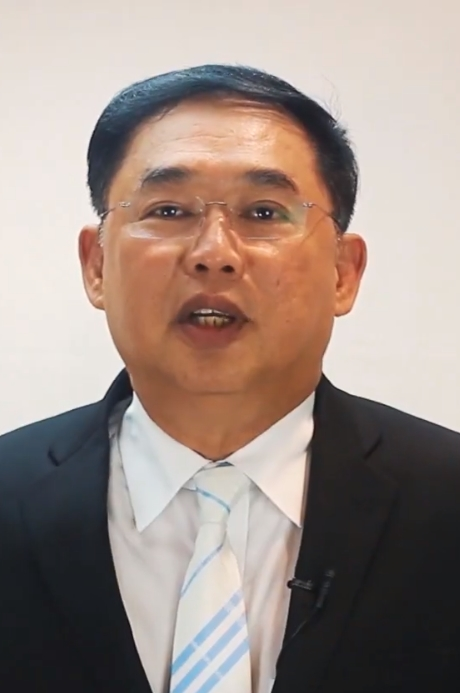
- Anucha Nakasai in 2020

Deputy Ministers of Agriculture and Cooperatives
- In office 1 September 2023 – 27 April 2024
- Prime Minister: Srettha Thavisin
- Minister: Thamanat Prompow

Member of the House of Representatives for Chainat 1st
- Incumbent
- Assumed office 24 March 2019
- Preceded by: Pornthiwa Saksiriwetkul
- Majority: 43,935 (46.25%)

Minister to the Office of the Prime Minister
- In office 5 August 2020 – 1 September 2023 Serving with Thanakorn Wangboonkongchana
- Prime Minister: Prayut Chan-o-cha
- Preceded by: Tewan Liptapallop
- Succeeded by: Puangpetch Chunla-iad

Personal details
- Born: 15 April 1960 (age 66) Chai Nat, Thailand
- Party: United Thai Nation
- Spouse: Porntiwa Nakasai
- Education: Ramkhamhaeng University
- Profession: Politician

Anucha Nakasai (Thai: อนุชา นาคาศัย, RTGS: Anucha Nakhasai; born 15 April 1960) is a Thai politician. He served as Prime Minister's Office Minister in the second cabinet of Prime Minister Prayut Chan-o-cha.

== Personal life and education ==
Anucha Nakasai was born on 15 April 1960 in Pho Nang Dam Tok, Sapphaya District, Chainat Province. He graduated from Bodindecha (Sing Singhaseni) School and then graduated with a bachelor's degree in Law from Ramkhamhaeng University in 1984.

In his family life, he married Porntiwa Nakasai, former Minister of Commerce and former Secretary-General of Bhumjaithai Party. He has two children. In 2014, he divorced Porntiwa Nakasai.

== Careers ==
Anucha Nakasai is a member of the House of Representatives of Chainat Province under the Thai Rak Thai Party and later in 2007, political rights were disqualified for five years as the executive director of the Thai Rak Thai Party, which was dissolved in the 2006 party dissolution case. Anucha Nakasai also gave political support to the Bhumjaithai Party whose ex-wife is also the party secretary. In 2018, Anucha moved to work with Palang Pracharath Party along with taking the position of Party Executive Committee and stepped up as party secretary on 27 June 2020 later in August of the same year he was appointed Minister to the Prime Minister's Office.
