= Sanan Kachornprasart =

Thai politician and military officer

- สนั่น ขจรประศาสน์
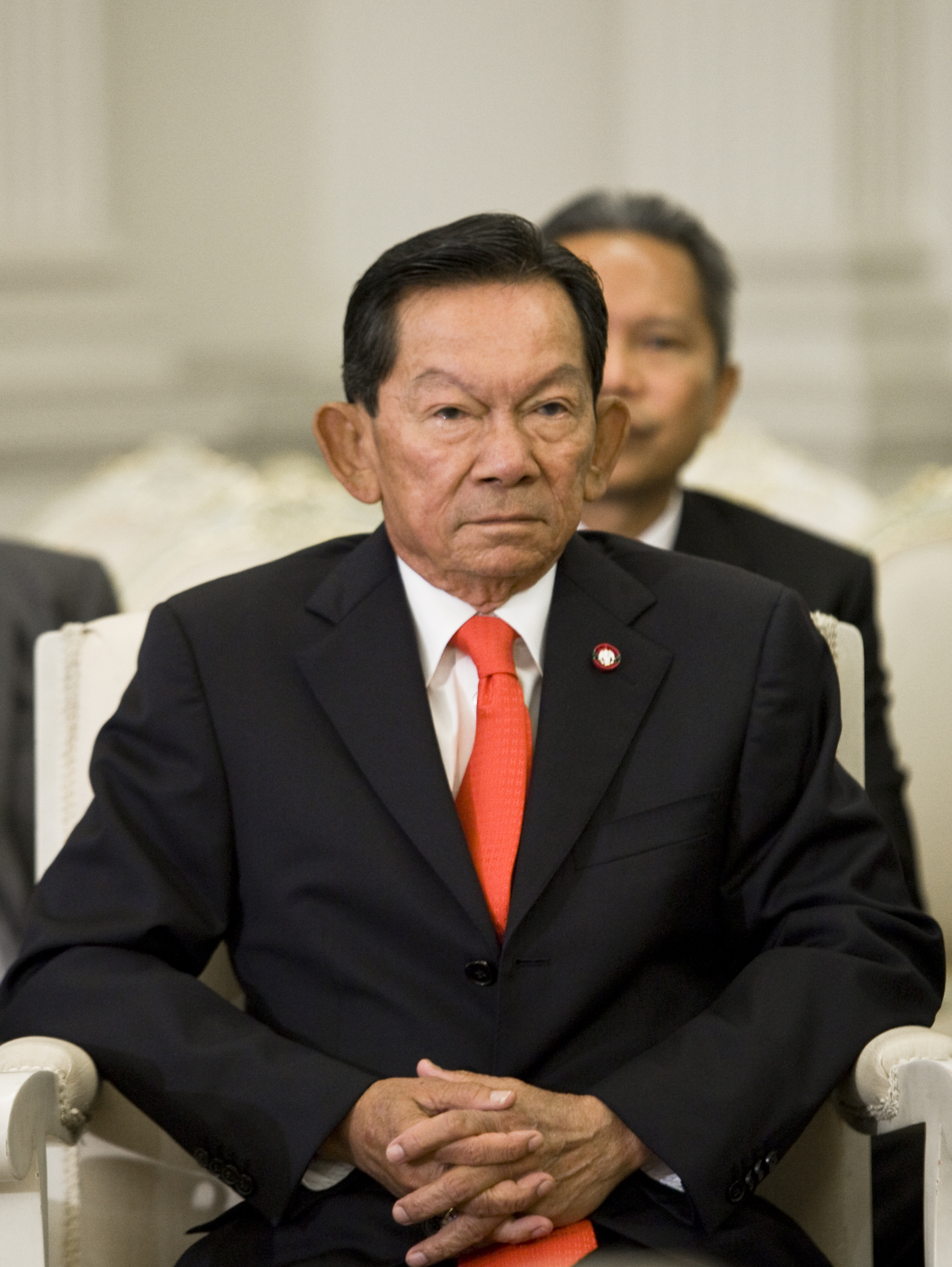
- Sanan Kachornprasart at Government House in 2009

Deputy Prime Minister of Thailand
- In office 6 February 2008 – 9 August 2011
- Prime Minister: Samak Sundaravej; Somchai Wongsawat; Abhisit Vejjajiva
- In office 5 October 1998 – 29 March 2000
- Prime Minister: Chuan Leekpai
- In office 26 August 1990 – 9 December 1990
- Prime Minister: Chatichai Choonhavan

Minister of Interior
- In office 14 November 1997 – 29 March 2000
- Prime Minister: Chuan Leekpai
- Preceded by: Sanoh Thienthong
- Succeeded by: Banyat Bantadtan
- In office 17 December 1994 – 9 December 1995
- Prime Minister: Chuan Leekpai
- Preceded by: Chavalit Yongchaiyudh
- Succeeded by: Banharn Silpa-archa

Minister of Industry
- In office 29 September 1992 – 13 December 1995
- Prime Minister: Chuan Leekpai
- Preceded by: Sippanon Ketthat
- Succeeded by: Trairong Suwankiri

Minister of Agriculture and Cooperatives
- In office 4 August 1988 – 26 August 1990
- Prime Minister: Chatichai Choonhavan
- Preceded by: Harn Leenanon
- Succeeded by: Chuan Leekpai

Personal details
- Born: 7 September 1935 Pho Thale, Phichit, Thailand
- Died: 15 February 2013 (aged 77) Siriraj Hospital, Bangkok, Thailand
- Party: Chartthaipattana (2008-2013); Chart Thai (2007-2008); Mahachon (2004-2007); Democrat (1983-2000)
- Spouse: Chawiwan Kachornprasart
- Children: 4
- Profession: Politician; soldier

Military service
- Allegiance: Thailand
- Branch/service: Royal Thai Army
- Rank: Major General

Sanan Kachornprasart (Thai: สนั่น ขจรประศาสน์, RTGS: Sanan Khachonprasat, pronounced [sā.nàn khā.t͡ɕɔ̄ːn.prā.sàːt]; born 7 September 1935 – 15 February 2013) was a Thai politician and military officer (Major General). He was deputy prime minister in the cabinet of Abhisit Vejjajiva, and was chief advisor of Chartthaipattana Party.

== Early life and military service ==
Sanan Kachornprasart was born in Pho Thale, Phichit. He graduated from Chulachomklao Royal Military Academy and United States Army Armor School, at Fort Knox, Kentucky. Afterwards he served as an officer in the tank force (in Thailand traditionally "cavalry") of the Royal Thai Army until he was dismissed for supporting the coup d'état of 26 March 1977, led by General Chalard Hiransiri against the Thanin Kraivichien government. Sanan, by that time a lieutenant colonel, was imprisoned in Lat Yao prison charged with treason, just like his academy and Fort Knox mate Manoonkrit Roopkachorn. He was released when General Kriangsak Chomanan took power in 1979. He was later rehabilitated and promoted to major general.

== Political career ==
Later, Sanan entered politics. He became a member of the Democrat Party. From 1988 until his leave in 2000, he held the position of Secretary-General of the party. He served as Minister of Agriculture from 1988 to 1990 and Deputy Prime Minister for three months in autumn 1990 under Chatichai Choonhavan, as Minister of Industry from 1992 to 1994 and as Interior Minister from 1994 to 1995 in Chuan Leekpai's first government, notable for forbidding the police to pursue lèse-majesté cases. When, after two years of opposition, the Democrats regained government in 1997, Premier Chuan re-appointed Sanan Minister of Interior for a second term until 2000. He was Chuan's Deputy Prime Minister from 1998 to 2000.

In 2000 Sanan came under the suspicion of corruption. The National Anti-Corruption Commission (NACC) initiated investigations on the hint by an opposition MP, that a 45 million baht loan by A.A.S. Autoservice, in fact was no loan. On 23 August the Constitutional Court ruled that Sanan had given false information about his assets and banned him from politics for five years in accordance with article 295 of the 1997 constitution.

After his ban expired, Sanan left the Democrat Party. In 2004 he founded the Mahachon Party, together with Anek Laothamatas. Sanan served as the secretary of the party. The Mahachon Party won 8.3% of the votes and two of the 500 seats in the 2005 election. In 2007 Sanan and his son Siriwat left the party for the conservative-populist Thai Nation Party, coalition partner of the People's Power Party (PPP) in the Somchai Wongsawat government. In early-December 2008, the Constitutional Court dissolved all governing parties, the Nation Party was mostly reborn as the Thai Nation Development Party (Chartthaipattana Party, CTP), of which Sanan is the chief adviser.

On 15 December 2008 the CTP joined the Democrat-led coalition government under Abhisit and Sanan was appointed Deputy Prime Minister with focus on social policies. After the 2011 election, he resigned from the cabinet, even though the CTP was also part of the new Pheu Thai Party-led coalition.

== Private life ==
Sanan was married to Chawiwan Kachornprasart and they had four children. His third son is also a CTP politician, Siriwat Kachornprasart, who was deputy minister of commerce in Yingluck Shinawatra's cabinet. Sanan owned the biggest ostrich farm in Thailand, called "Kajorn Farm" and a vineyard in Dong Charoen District, Phichit Province, where he cultivated the wine "Chateau de Shala One".

== Death ==
Sanan Kachornprasart died in Bangkok on 15 February 2013 at the age of 77.

== Honours ==
=== Royal decorations ===
Sanan has received the following royal decorations in the Honours System of Thailand:

- Knight Grand Cordon (Special Class) of the Most Exalted Order of the White Elephant
- Knight Grand Cordon (Special Class) of the Most Noble Order of the Crown of Thailand
- Freeman Safeguarding Medal - 2nd Class 2nd Cat
- Chakra Mala Medal
- Second Class of the Boy Scout Commendation Medal
- Serving Free People Medal
- Ribbon bar of Red Cross Medal of Appreciation, 2nd Class
