= Premiership of Abhisit Vejjajiva =

Period of the Government of Thailand from 2008 to 2011

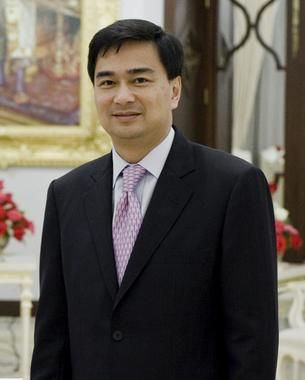
- Abhisit Vejjajiva in 2010.
- Premiership of Abhisit Vejjajiva; 17 December 2008 – 5 August 2011
- Monarch: Bhumibol Adulyadej
- Prime Minister: Abhisit Vejjajiva
- Cabinet: Abhisit cabinet
- Party: Democrat
- Nominated by: House of Representatives
- Appointed by: Monarch of Thailand
- Seat: Government House
- Seal of the Prime Minister

Abhisit Vejjajiva was formally endorsed by King Bhumibol Adulyadej as Prime Minister of Thailand on 17 December 2008. Abhisit ascended to power during the 2008 financial crisis.

Key appointments in Abhisit's government included PAD activist Kasit Piromya as Foreign Minister, construction tycoon Chaovarat Chanweerakul as Interior Minister, and investment banker and former Abhisit classmate Korn Chatikavanij as Finance Minister. Massage parlor tycoon Pornthiva Nakasai was appointed Deputy Commerce Minister.

Abhisit's first act as prime minister was to send SMS texts to tens of millions of Thai mobile phone users. The message, signed "Your PM", asked people to help him solve the country's crisis. Interested phone users were asked to send back their postal codes, at a cost of three baht. Abhisit was criticized for violating privacy regulations in the mass SMS. The National Telecommunication Commission says that mobile phone service providers may not exploit client information, including phone numbers, without their consent. However, it did not pursue action against Abhisit.

According to a survey by Assumption University's Abac Poll in May 2009, Abhisit received a 70% approval rating, the highest within the cabinet. The government's overall approval rating was 59% "rather much or much" satisfied and 9.4% "very much" satisfied. Overall the government was rated 6.5 out of 10 by a majority of respondents. In a nationwide survey conducted 24–25 December 2010, by Bangkok University, the government's two years in power were rated 4.61 out of 10, with the PM's performance at 5.17.

== Domestic policy ==
=== Government debt ===
Abhisit borrowed heavily to finance his various populist policies and stimulus packages. The government borrowed a record-breaking 1.49 trillion baht from 2009 to early 2011, compared to the previous 26 prime ministers who had combined borrowings of only 870 billion baht. Thailand's national debt at the end of February 2011 was 3.59 trillion baht, or 40% of GDP. By April 2011, the Governor of the Bank of Thailand, Thailand's central bank, warned that implementing Abhisit's populist policies might cause public debt to surge past the legal debt ceiling of no more than 50% of GDP. The government countered the BoT's warning by claiming it was just expression of opinion in a technical manner. Abhisit noted that several countries had experienced debt crises, but not Thailand.

=== Economic recession and stimulus ===
The global economic crisis had a major impact on Thailand, with unemployment increasing by 63% to 880,000 people nationwide between December 2008 and January 2009, and analysts predicting the country's economy could contract by as much as 5% on the year.

Abhisit responded to the crisis with two economic stimulus packages. The government announced the first, 117-billion-baht stimulus package in January 2009. The package included a one-time issuance of 2,000 baht (approximately US$75) checks to people making less than 15,000 baht (approximately US$500) a month. A training program, dubbed "Ton Kla A-cheep" was initiated for up to 500,000 new graduates and unemployed people. Free government education was expanded to up to 15 years, as written in the constitution, saving approximately 2,000 baht per term per student. A pension of 500 baht a month was provided to those aged 60 and above. Price guarantees were instituted to subsidize rice, corn, and tapioca farmers. The government provided funds to villages nationwide to carry out projects based on King Bhumibol's sufficiency economy philosophy.

The cabinet approved the second, 1.4-trillion-baht package in May. The plan was called "Strong Thailand" (Thai Khem Khaeg), with the majority of the money dedicated to infrastructure improvements. In addition, a program was initiated to provide resolve land-title issues for squatters living on state land. The government attempted to transfer private loans from loan sharks to state-owned banks, protecting debtors from unreasonably high interest rate demanded by the loan sharks and helping them finance their families again.

By the end of 2009, Thailand's economy had only contracted by 2.3%, buoyed by 5.8% economic growth in the fourth quarter of the year.

=== Public health ===
Abhisit continued the Surayud junta's policy of compulsory licensing of pharmaceuticals, saying that it complied with the World Trade Organization's agreement on intellectual property. As of March 2009, he warned that there would be societal pressure to expand compulsory licensing if the US downgraded Thailand's trade status.

Despite opposition, Abhisit continued to support public health protection and refused to drop the Medical Malpractice Victim Protection Bill in the ongoing legislative process. Furthermore, he set up a national-level committee to improve the draft before sending the final copy to the parliament. "We need to push ahead with the legislation. For some contentious points in this bill, all sides just need to talk and cooperate," Abhisit said after a meeting with representatives from the Network for People's Medical Protection and the Federation of Medical Workers, where both sides sought to have a national committee set-up to improve the bill.

In 2009, Abhisit said that it was his government's goal to reduce the number of new HIV cases in the country by 50% by 2011. He noted that new cases among married women increased by 30% to 40% and promised to be involved in a campaign to promote fidelity among married couples. In 2010, he became a presenter in his government's "honest husband" campaign and vowed to become a role model of fidelity for all married men.

=== Energy ===
The Abhisit government subsidized the price of diesel, LPG cooking gas, and household electricity. He maintained a retail price of diesel of no more than 30 baht/liter by reducing fuel taxes and spending from the government's oil fund. 8.5 billion baht per month in government tax revenue was forgone due to the cuts in excise tax. By mid-April, the oil fund had 34 billion baht in cash and 29 billion baht in debt, leaving it with 4.5 billion baht in net funds. The fund was expected to be completely depleted by the end of April. Abhisit extended temporary government subsidies which provided free electricity to about 30 million Thai households that used fewer than 90 units a month. In April 2011, he made the free-electricity policy permanent, although industrial and commercial electricity users (rather than the government) were now burdened with paying for the 12 billion baht per year subsidy.

=== Transportation ===
==== Bus and train subsidies ====
The Abhisit government repeatedly extended temporary subsidies that provided free bus and train rides. Abhisit also proposed making the free rides permanent.

==== BTS ====
Under the guidance of Abhisit's administration, the BTS Sky Train, which is a rail-based mass transit system in Bangkok, launched a new 2.2-kilometre extension linking the Saphan Taksin Bridge Station to Krung Thonburi Station and Wong Wian Yai Station on the Thonburi side of Bangkok. The new service linked Sathorn Road, one of Bangkok's prime business districts, to Thonburi on the west bank of the Chao Phraya River. Under the "Thai Khem Khang Project", BTS is in the process of constructing the 6.7-kilometre extension from Onnuj station to Sukhumvit 107. This is expected to be ready within two years. Another section of 12.8-km to connect to Bang Pu district in Samut Prakan Province has also been planned for a later stage. Additionally, a 4.5-kilometre route from Taksin Bridge to Nong Khaem district is also expected to begin service within two years.

==== High-speed train route ====
Abhisit emphasized that high-speed trains would not only facilitate the rapid movement of goods and people, but would provide even more benefits to Thailand once ASEAN becomes a single market and Thailand becomes a stronger production base for the economic community. As Asian economies look more towards regional rather than Western trade for future growth, it's a forward-looking plan with the potential to position Thailand as a highly efficient regional hub connecting China to Southeast Asia.

The project will have two phases: from Nong Khai in the northeast to Bangkok, from Bangkok to Rayong, and from Bangkok to Padang Besar, on the border with Malaysia. The transnational line will start from Kunming in China's southwestern Yunnan province and run south to Thailand through Laos and Vietnam.

The entire project, from Nong Khai to Bangkok and Rayong, and from Bangkok to Padang Besar, will cost almost 350 billion baht. The railway tracks will be built parallel with existing tracks, but with a wider gauge of 1.4 metres, instead of the current gauge of 1 metre. The Nong Khai-Bangkok route says it will cover a total distance of 615 kilometres. The track will run through a tunnel of about 10 km and will be elevated over a distance of 59 km. The high-speed train will travel at no less than 200 kilometres per hour. It will be electrically powered, and studies have shown that existing power supplies will be sufficient.

Once this project has been completed, travelling by train from Bangkok to Kunming will take around five hours, three hours from Bangkok to Vientiane, and less than five hours from Bangkok to Padang Basar.

==== Airport link ====
Abhisit's administration completed the Airport Link project that was delayed by the previous government due to several factors. Suvarnabhumi Airport's Link, which connects downtown Bangkok and Suvarnabhumi airport, began commercial services on 23 August 2010. The Airport Link's City Line will run every 15 minutes and the Express Line every 30 minutes. Both lines operate from 06:00 to midnight. The trains have a maximum speed of 160 kilometres per hour. The City Line will make eight stops across the capital, starting at Phaya Thai, before heading to the airport. The trains take 30 minutes from Phaya Thai to Suvarnabhumi.

=== Information and communications technology ===
Abhisit's information and communications technology (ICT) policy included censorship of Internet sites the government considered offensive to the monarchy. Abhisit's ICT minister, Ranongruk Suwunchwee, met with officials of TOT and CAT (both state-owned telecommunications firms) in 2009 to inform them of the policy. Ranongruk said 45 million baht was spent on a war room where government staff worked around the clock to block access to certain websites in Thailand. By September 2009, more than 17,000 "offensive" websites were blocked.

An auction for 3G 2.1 gigahertz spectrum licenses organized by the National Telecommunications Commission was cancelled after state-owned firms CAT Telecom and TOT successfully filed an injunction which claimed that the NTC lacked the authority to organize the auction. They also argued that the auction would cause the state agencies to lose revenue. The regulator originally planned to hold the auctions prior to the 2006 military coup. Five days after the injunction, the government approved a 19.9 billion baht budget for TOT to expand its existing 3G network.

Within mass communication, it is difficult to delineate between objective and biased information. On one hand, the media can be used to provide useful information; on the other hand, it can be used to increase the popularity of the government. And this is why there arises the debate about whether the government is justified to use mass communication, and to what extent.

=== Defense ===
Abhisit's government approved military budgets of 170 billion baht in 2011 and 154 billion baht in 2010. In the 2011 appropriation, 19.5 billion baht was allocated for the purchase of six JAS 39 Gripen fighter planes, in addition to the six aircraft purchased by the military junta of Surayud Chulanont. Army Commander Anupong noted that the military's budget would be increased to 2% of GDP, from about 1% of GDP prior to the 2006 coup.

=== South Thailand insurrection ===
==== Rising levels of violence ====
In July 2009, Abhisit claimed that violence in southern Thailand decreased since his government took over, thanks to a focus on economic development. His claim was contradicted by Deep South Watch, an academic think-tank at the Prince of Songkhla University in Pattani Province, which showed that violence actually increased since the beginning of the 2009.

In February 2010, the government said that it was capable of eliminating insurgency violence by the end of the year. Foreign Minister Kasit claimed a "sense of optimism" in the region. By the end of 2010, insurgency-related violence had increased, confounding the government's optimism.

==== Torture allegations ====
The Abhisit government was condemned by several international human rights groups for the routine and systematic torture of suspected insurgents. In just a two-month period in 2010, Amnesty International received eight reports of torture. "The security forces continue to use torture even though senior commanders claim to have prohibited it," found Brussels-based International Crisis Group. Common methods of torture allegedly used by the army, many of which occurred at the Ingkhayutthabariharn Reconciliation Promotion Center, included severe beatings, suffocation with plastic bags, electric shocks, forced nudity, exposure to extreme cold or heat, needles inserted into open wounds, and holding detainees' family members hostage, including, in one case, a 6-year-old boy.

Abhisit personally denied the torture allegations and questioned the accuracy of Amnesty International's claims. The army repeatedly denied the allegations. "We have never committed torture," said regional commander Lieut. General Udomchai Thamsarorat.

Human Rights Watch criticized the government for failing to curb torture and abuses by security forces in the south. It noted that no member of the security forces had ever been prosecuted for human rights abuses in the region. It found that insurgents used these state-sponsored abuses and to recruit new insurgents and justify their campaign of violence.

=== Immigration ===
Abhisit enacted measures that required approximately 1.5 million migrants to register with the government under a new, time-consuming system that involved verifying the migrants' identities with their home governments, or be arrested and deported. The deadline for compliance, initially 28 February 2010, was extended to 2 March after several hundred thousand migrants failed to appear. Although migrant labor from Myanmar, Cambodia, Laos, and elsewhere make up 5–10% of Thailand's work force, migrants are critical in keeping Thailand's wages competitive with China. Human-rights groups noted that migrants have plenty of reasons to fear declaring themselves, including a history of past mistreatment, including bribery, rape, and arbitrary arrest by Thai authorities. Other migrant workers worry that information about their activities will be shared with their home governments, exposing them or their families to harassment.

==== Rohingya refugees ====
In January 2009, CNN investigations revealed that up to 1,000 Rohingya refugees from Myanmar had been captured by the Thai Navy, beaten, then towed out to sea without engines or navigational aids and with little food and water. Abhisit's initial response was to claim that the media reports were "exaggerated" and that the refugees would "sail on boats without engines or sink their ships so that authorities help them to get onshore." Army Commander Anupong Paojinda denied the reports of abuse.

On 20 January, the United Nations High Commission for Refugees (UNHCR) requested that the Thai government provide them access to the 126 surviving boat people in their custody. Abhisit said he was "glad to work with international organisations" but that such organizations would have to work on a cooperative basis with proper Thai government procedures. The military said it had "no clear information" about refugees in its custody.

Further media investigations revealed that refugees had very recently been cleared from a detention center but were nowhere to be found. A Thai Navy officer was interviewed, saying that "We have to take the engines off the boats or they will come back. The wind will carry them to India or somewhere." Abhisit then promised a thorough military-led investigation. The investigation was led by the Internal Security Operations Command (ISOC), the same unit in charge of refugee arrivals.

The ISOC investigation cleared all the government officials involved. Consequently, ISOC continued to be in charge of refugee arrivals.

Abhisit's deputy, Suthep Thaugsuban, suggested the entire situation was cooked up to besmirch Thailand's image. Foreign Minister Kasit Piromya said that the CNN reports were incorrect and called for people not to "believe what the world says about Rohingya."

UNHCR goodwill ambassador Angelina Jolie criticised the Thai government of ignoring the plight of Rohingyas and suggested that Thai government should take better care of the Burmese ethnics. The foreign ministry reprimanded the UNHCR, noting that the UNHCR had "no mandate" and saying that the matter should not be mentioned by it and its "guests." Abhisit was criticized by both Thai and international commentators for defending the military at the expense of protecting the human rights of the refugees. "We are not going to see the Abhisit government going after the military because it was instrumental in his assumption of office," said political scientist Thitinan Pongsudhirak.

=== Lèse majesté ===
In October 2008, the PPP/Samak administration allocated 100 million baht to establish a special task-force to step up lèse majesté enforcement, and set up a website where individuals could report violations to the Thai authorities. In 2009, Abhisit acknowledged that the country's lese majeste laws had been abused in the past, and said he would attempt to address the problem. He established an advisory committee on the fair application of lese majeste laws in January 2010.

In 2010, Privy Councilor Air Chief Marshal Kamthon Sindhavananda said the Abhisit government had been slow to respond to perceived threats against the monarchy. In response, Abhisit said protecting the monarchy was the government's top priority, and pledged to "improve mechanisms to safeguard the royal institution."

During Abhisit's tenure, the arrest of Prachatai editor Chiranuch Premchaiporn also became a cause célèbre. Chiranuch was charged under the Computer Crimes Act for not quickly deleting online comments posted to her news website that were allegedly insulting to the monarchy. Chiranuch faced up to 50 years in prison on the initial charges. She was arrested again on separate charges after attending "Internet at Liberty 2010," an international conference on media freedom. Amnesty International, the Committee to Protect Journalists, and Reporters Without Borders all criticized the arrest.

=== Thaksin Shinawatra ===
Abhisit was highly critical of Thaksin throughout his time in power. Through his spokesperson, Panithan Wattanayakorn, he accused Thaksin of funding the red shirt UDD movement from abroad. When UDD leaders and Thaksin denied the accusation and demanded proof of the government's accusations, Deputy Premier Suthep noted that it still did not have any confirmation as to any transfers.

Abhisit also denied the legitimacy of Thaksin's leadership of the UDD and has refused to deal directly with Thaksin. Abhisit argued that Thaksin's wealth and corrupt background were at odds with the UDD's largely agrarian and working-class membership and ideologies, and that this hypocrisy undermined red shirt demands for fairer politics led by a less elite government.

In the days before the verdict of the supreme court's seizure of Thaksin's assets was announced, Abhisit announced that he would possibly forgive Thaksin if Thaksin showed remorse.

On 11 November 2009, Sivarak Chutipong was arrested by Cambodian police for passing the confidential flight plans of Thaksin and Cambodian Prime Minister Hun Sen to Kamrob Palawatwichai, First Secretary of the Royal Thai Embassy in Cambodia. Sivarak was sentenced to seven years in jail, but later pardoned after Thaksin made a personal appeal on his behalf to the Cambodian government. Deputy Prime Minister Suthep Thaugsuban later accused Sivarak of staging his own arrest in order to discredit the Abhisit government.

=== 2010 floods ===
From 10 October to 19 November 2010, major floods hit north and northeast, central, and then southern Thailand. More than 230 people were killed and more than seven million people in 25,00 villages were affected by the flooding. Abhisit faced criticism early on for failing to respond promptly to help flood victims in the north and northeast and for insufficient coordination of relief efforts, but was praised for flying promptly down to Hat Yai to tour the flooded city. Abhisit initially assigned flood management primary responsibility to former Deputy Prime Minister Suthep Thaugsuban, although Suthep later resigned to take part in a by-election campaign. Then on 24 October, Abhisit appointed PM's Office Minister Sathit Wongnongtoey and advisor Apirak Kosayothin to lead a committee to deal with the floods. Rice farmers in flooded areas were offered hand-outs of up to 55% of their production cost. Starting 2 November, the government handed out 5,000 baht in cash to some 632,000 households. Recipients had to live in a house that flooded for more than seven days. Further housing, education and public health assistance was expected to be implemented within three months, with expedited assistance for districts where the flooding had ceased. The Stock Exchange of Thailand was unaffected, but prices of rice and rubber saw their largest gains in two decades.

=== 2011 floods ===
The 2011 rainy season, which started at the end of the Abhisit-government, brought the worst flooding that Thailand had seen in 50 years. Hundreds died, and Bangkok was flooded. Meteorological Department deputy director-general Somchai Baimoung blamed his department's inability to predict rainfall on the Abhisit government's unwillingness in 2009 and 2010 to provide a requested four billion baht overhaul of its radar and modeling systems. It was reported that from 20 to 23 October 2011, as flood waters entered Bangkok, Abhisit took a holiday with his family to the Maldives. These reports were initially denied by the Democrat Party, with both Democrat Spokesperson Chawanan Intharakoman and Shadow ICT Minister Sirichok Sopha claiming that he was in Bangkok planning flood relief operations. On 25 October, Democrat Spokesperson Chawanan Intharakoman retracted his earlier denial, claiming that the trip had been planned long in advance and that Abhisit also took the opportunity to meet the President of the Maldives to discuss the floods.

== Foreign relations ==
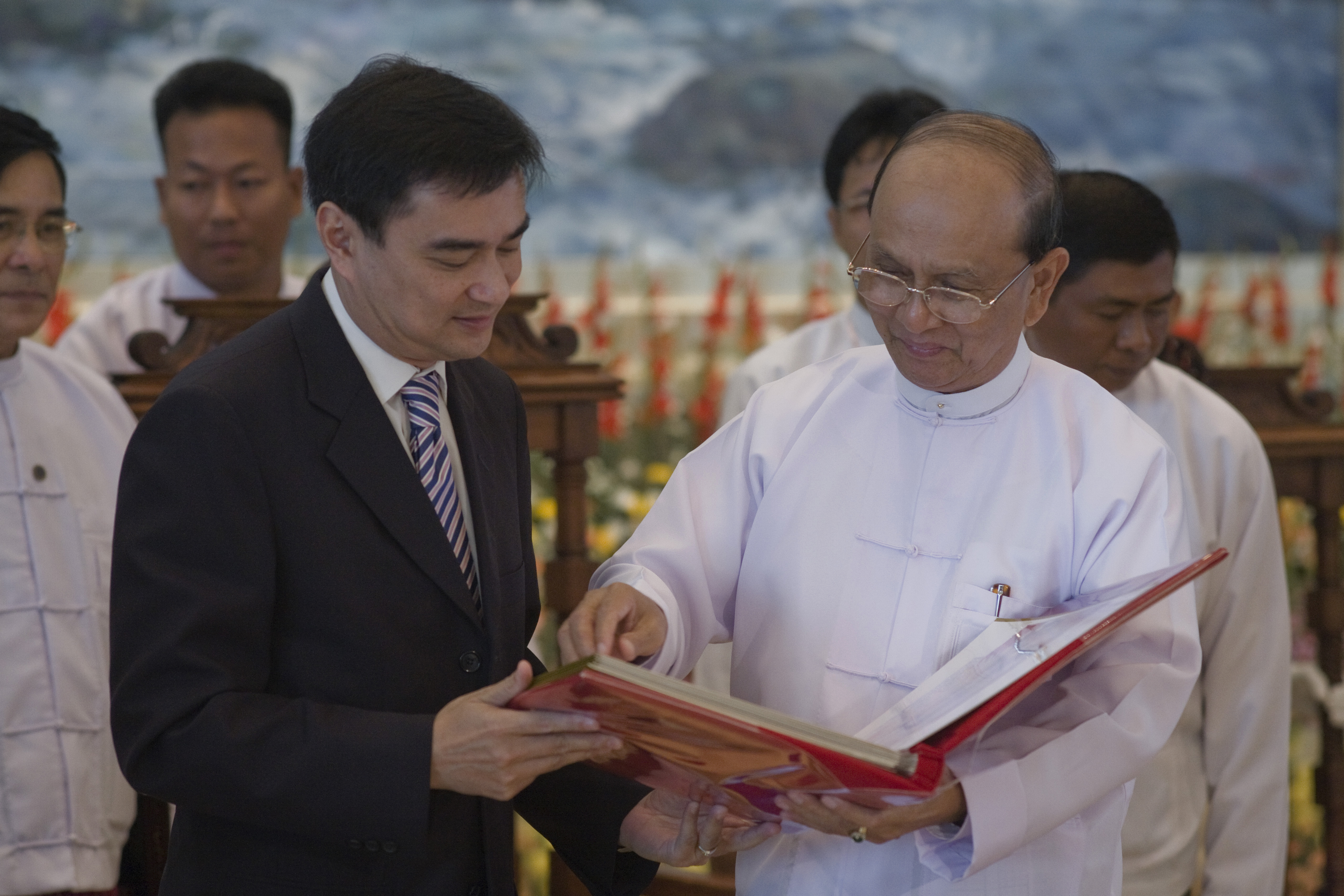
Abhisit with Prime Minister Thein Sein of Myanmar

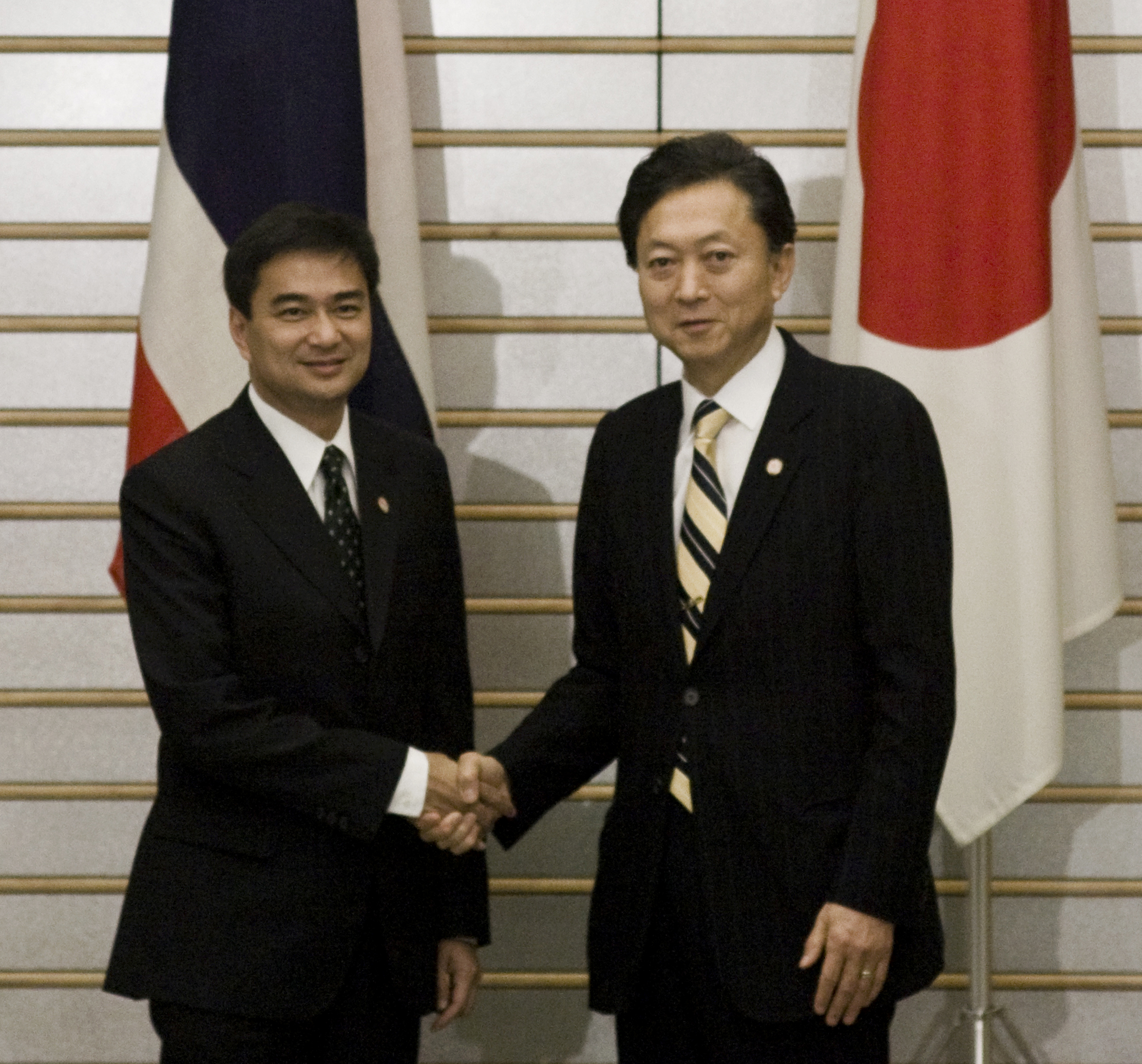
Abhisit with Japanese Prime Minister Yukio Hatoyama in 2009.

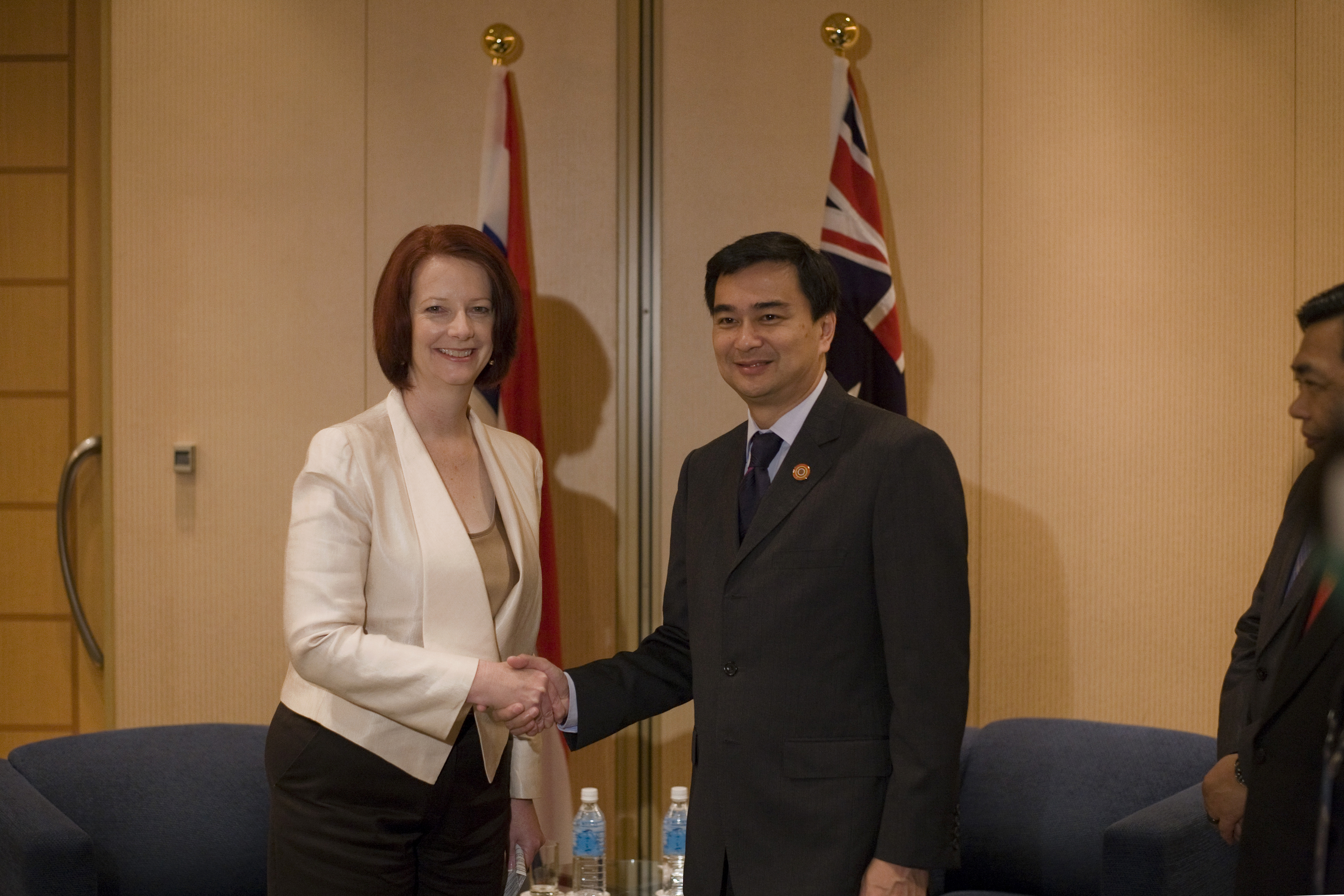
Abhisit with Australian Prime Minister Julia Gillard in 2010.

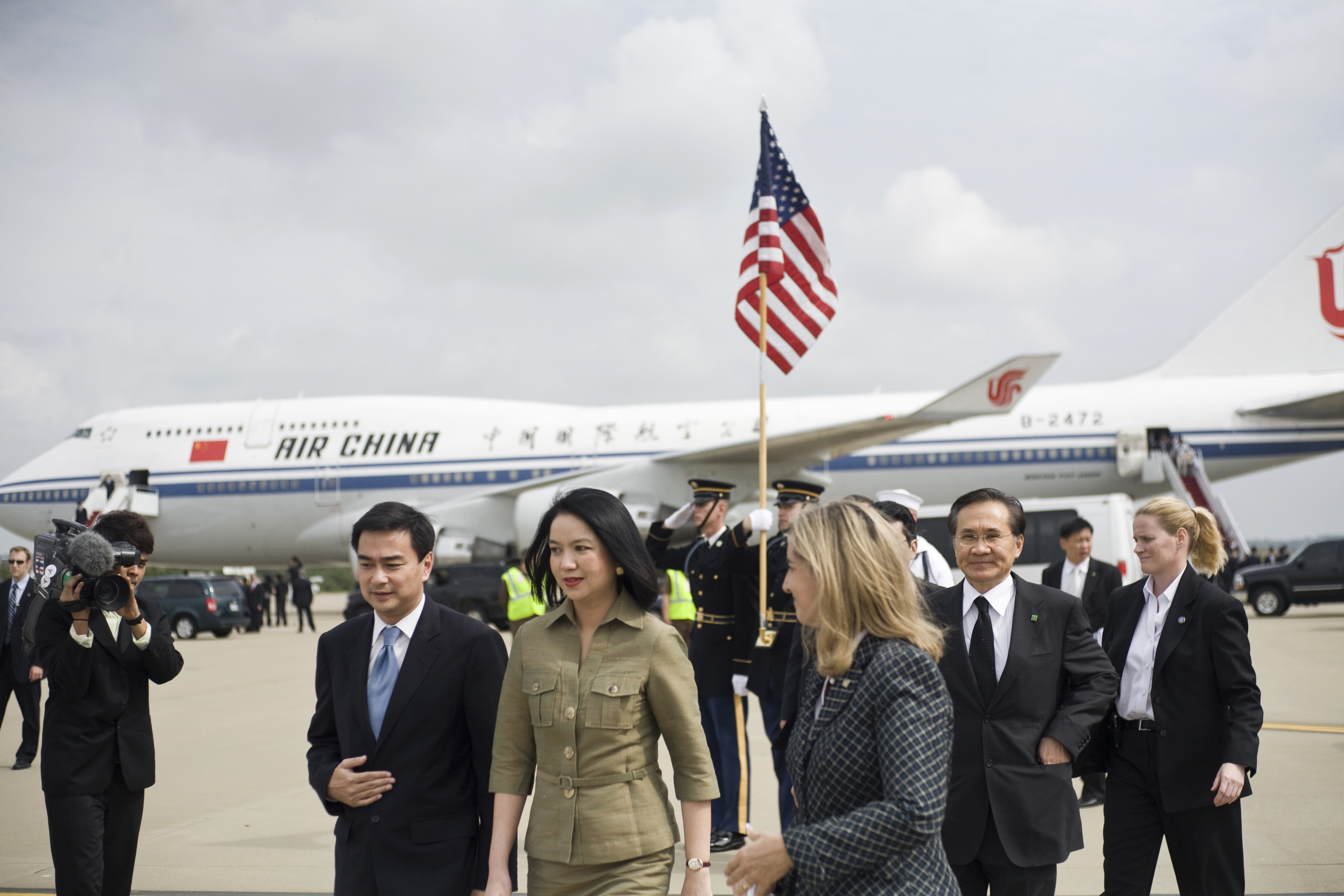
Abhisit with US officials at Pittsburgh International Airport.

=== Myanmar ===
Abhisit officially visited Myanmar in October 2010 to strengthen the relationship between the two countries. Abhisit met with Senior-General Than Shwe to promote cordial ties and bilateral development between the neighboring countries. The meeting covered subjects on rule of law, stability and development in border areas, economy and technology cooperation, boosting bilateral trade and investment, promoting tourism, and building a deep-sea port in Dawei, Myanmar workers in Thailand, and internal affairs of both countries.

Traders said that adding new border trade zones since 2009 has encouraged cross-border trade and maintained border stability. The opening of new borders would lower illegal trade and boost tourism.

In addition, Abhisit hoped that the Myawaddy-Mae Sot crossing would reopen soon after Myanmar had closed the checkpoint due to internal security problems.

==== Deep sea port ====
After a bilateral meeting between Abhisit and Prime Minister Thein Sein, the two premiers agreed to jointly develop a deep-sea port at Dawei, on Myanmar's Andaman Sea coast. Abhisit said the port will be linked to a new economic zone in the region.

Experts said the port would remove trade barriers and significantly shorten the distance that ships from Europe, the Middle East, and Africa have to travel to reach China, Thailand, Vietnam, and Laos. Ships now travel up to an additional 2,316 kilometers in the region because they have to pass through Singapore.

The agreement signed during Abhisit's visit to Myanmar also included the construction of 160 km (160 miles) of road and rail between Kanchanaburi Province in Thailand and the Dawei port in Myanmar.

Italian-Thai Development Pcl Ltd is expected to sign a contract to construct the port with the Myanmar Port Authority by the end of November. The construction is estimated to cost 400 billion baht (approximately US$13 billion), which includes a railway, roads, industrial estates, a refinery, and a steel mill.

=== Japan ===
Foreign Minister Katsuya Okada affirmed strong ties between Japan and Thailand, showing that he still had confidence in the Thai economy. The meeting covered the exchange of ideas on different matters, including relationships in trade and investment between the two countries.

=== China ===
Hu Jintao, Chinese leader praised Abhisit's ability to maintain a strong relationship that has been established for 35 years. After the first official visit of Abhisit to China, President Hu declared that both of the governments would support each other in diplomatic relations in the region and economics, especially international trading and investment. Abhisit noted that the transportation system that links the northern part of Thailand and China would be developed within a few years in order to strengthen relationship between Thai and Chinese.

==== Thailand-China high-speed train ====
Thailand and China agreed to proceed with rail connections that will connect the two countries through neighboring Laos. The plan also calls for high-speed routes connecting Nong Khai to Bangkok and then eastwards to the industrially-driven Thai eastern seaboard, with a third line linking the capital to the country's southern region near the Malaysian border at Padang Basar. The planned links aim to enhance rising trade flows sparked by the new China-Association of Southeast Nations (ASEAN) free-trade agreement and facilitate with modern infrastructure the region's move towards a common ASEAN market.

On China's part, it will build a standard railway from Kunming to Vientiane, covering a distance of 420 km. This line will then link with Thailand across the Mekong River to Nong Khai before continuing to Bangkok and Rayong. China says it is willing to provide support in manpower, training, and technology transfer to the State Railway of Thailand.

China has said it would promote Thailand as a tourist destination among Chinese. It would as well consider buying more rice from Thailand, while adding the rail link would allow people in the region to travel and enhance logistics.

=== Cambodia ===
==== Preah Vihear and border conflict ====
On 8 July 2008, the UN World Heritage Committee added Preah Vihear to the World Heritage Site list. The People's Alliance for Democracy (PAD) claimed that this gave Cambodia de facto sovereignty over disputed territory immediately adjacent to the temple, and used this claim to launch large nationalist protests against the government of Somchai Wongsawat.

After Abhisit rose to power, he appointed Kasit Piromya as foreign minister. Prior to his appointment, the former diplomat led PAD's anti-Cambodia protests. During PAD's siege and occupation of Suvarnabhumi Airport, Kasit reportedly said "I will use Hun Sen's blood to wash my feet," recalling the historic incident where King Naresuan of Siam did the same to King Barom Reachea IV of Cambodia. In a 2008 television interview, he called Cambodian Prime Minister Hun Sen "crazy", a "slave", and a "nak leng" (commonly translated as "gangster"). After his appointment, he later wrote to Hun Sen, saying it was all a misunderstanding, and that "nak leng" actually meant "a person who is lionhearted, a courageous and magnanimous gentleman."

In April 2009, fighting erupted between Thai and Cambodian troops near Preah Vihear. At least two Thai soldiers and two Cambodian soldiers were killed. The Cambodian government claimed its army had killed at least four Thai soldiers and captured 10 more, but the Thai government denied that any Thai soldiers were killed or injured. Both armies blamed the other for firing first and denied entering the other's territory.

Fighting escalated in early-February 2011, when Thai forces allegedly used banned cluster munitions against Cambodian villages. Three Thais and eight Cambodians were killed and dozens of people wounded in the bloodiest border fighting in nearly two decades. As part of an ASEAN-brokered ceasefire deal, Thailand and Cambodia agreed on 22 February to allow unarmed military observers from Indonesia to be posted along their border. The Thai government later reneged on the agreement, refusing to allow foreigners into border areas. "There's a [bilateral] mechanism in place, so there's no need to run crying to ASEAN or the international community," Foreign Minister Kasit proclaimed.

Fighting further escalated on 22 April 2011, leaving at least five dead near Ta Moan and Ta Krabey temples 140 to 153 kilometers west of Preah Vihear. Both sides claimed that the other side fired first. Cambodia accused the Thai military of again firing cluster munitions into villages, this time up to 20 kilometers inside Cambodia. Cambodia also accused the Thais of using chemical weapons. The accusations were rejected by the Thai military. Cambodian Defence Ministry spokesman Chhum Socheat claimed that Thai artillery landed more than 20 kilometers inside Cambodian territory. Over 25,000 Thais and over 23,000 Cambodians were evacuated. Fighting continued and by 26 April had expanded into the area around Preah Vihear temple. Army Chief Prayut Chan-o-cha revealed that cabinet discussions were underway on whether to declare war with Cambodia. Plans for ministerial-level talks on 27 April were cancelled by Thailand on the evening of the 26th.

On 25 June, Thailand withdrew from the World Heritage Convention. Suwit Khunkitti, head of the Thai delegation to UNESCO, claimed that following the withdrawal, the World Heritage Committee could no longer force Thailand to comply with its decisions. The withdrawal occurred after five days of negotiations between Thailand, Cambodia, and the World Heritage Committee, during which the Thai delegation staged a walkout. After the walkout, the committee reaffirmed the need to ensure the protection and conservation of the temple site from any damage and further encouraged Thailand and Cambodia to use the convention as a tool to support conservation, sustainable development, and dialogue. Thailand's withdrawal occurred immediately afterwards.

==== Recall of ambassadors ====
In November 2009, Cambodia announced that Thaksin Shinawatra had been appointed a special advisor to the Cambodian government and to Cambodian Prime Minister Hun Sen. Thaksin had been residing in exile in Dubai, and continued to live there after the appointment. On 5 November 2009, Abhisit recalled Thailand's ambassador from Cambodia in protest. Abhisit said Cambodia was interfering in Thailand's internal affairs and as a result all bilateral co-operation agreements would be reviewed. In retaliation, Cambodia announced it was withdrawing its ambassador from Thailand. Sok An, a member of the Council of Ministers and Deputy Prime Minister of Cambodia, said Thaksin's appointment is a decision internal to Cambodia. "We are looking forward to learning from Thaksin's great economic experience and we are convinced that his experience will contribute to our country's economic development," said a Cambodia government spokesman. The mutual withdrawal of ambassadors was the most severe diplomatic action to have occurred between the two countries since the Franco-Thai war of 1940–41 during which Thailand regained Preah Vihear.

The increase in tensions between Cambodia and Thailand caused Abhisit's popularity to skyrocket, with support tripling according to one poll after diplomatic ties were downgraded. However, his rise in popularity was short-lived, and soon fell dramatically. When the crisis flared up again in February 2011, The People's Alliance for Democracy demanded for Abhisit to step down.

In August 2010, Thaksin resigned as an economic advisor to the Cambodian government. Abhisit normalized relations with Cambodia. Both countries sent back their ambassadors.

==== Use of cluster munitions ====
In February border clashes with Cambodian security forces, the Thai army was accused by the Cluster Munition Coalition (CMC) of firing cluster munitions into a Cambodian village. According to the coalition, this was the first confirmed use of cluster munitions anywhere in the world since the Convention on Cluster Munitions banning the weapons became international law. The government later admitted to using Dual-Purpose Improved Conventional Munition (DPICM), but denied that they were actually cluster munitions. However, the CMC claimed that DPICMs were a classic example of cluster munitions under the convention. Abhisit's government repeatedly denied that the military had cluster munitions in its arsenal, although it admitted that it had weapons with similar features to cluster munitions. Abhisit's spokesman claimed that the Thai government had the right to categorise weapons differently from militaries in other countries. The CMC's investigation found that a Thai cluster bomb had killed two Cambodian policemen during the February clashes and warned that thousands of people remained at risk from unexploded bomblets in several villages along the border.

The governments of Norway and the UK condemned the Thai government for its use of cluster munitions. "We condemn in the strongest terms the use of cluster munitions that causes unacceptable harm to the civilian population," said the UK Foreign and Commonwealth Office in a statement. "These weapons kill and maim civilians and have unacceptable humanitarian consequences long after they are used," said Norwegian Minister of Foreign Affairs Jonas Gahr Støre.

=== Vietnam ===
Abhisit and the Prime Minister of Vietnam met on 10 July 2009, to discuss how to address the global economic crisis. Abhisit arrived in Hanoi for a one-day visit with his Vietnamese counterpart Nguyễn Tấn Dũng. The two reviewed an honor guard before heading for an hour-and-half talk behind closed doors. "Your visit will contribute to expanding and deepening the friendship and multifaceted cooperation between Vietnam and Thailand," Dung told his guest during the five-minute photo opportunity.

In a regular press conference on 9 July, Foreign Ministry spokesman Le Dung told reporters that the two prime ministers were expected to discuss how each is dealing with the 2008 financial crisis, discuss the rice trade, tourism, transport links and protection of the Mekong River. Thailand is the world's leading exporter of the grain while Vietnam is ranked second. Thailand and Vietnam are important trading partners, and their bilateral trade reached US$6.5 billion in 2008. Thailand also ranked ninth among foreign investors in Vietnam, having poured nearly US$6 billion into the country. Vietnam, which has recorded average economic growth of 7% over the past decade, saw its economy expand only 3.9% in the first half of 2009.

=== Saudi Arabia ===
In August 2008, the Department of Special Investigation announced that it had found a suspect for the murder of several Saudi Arabian diplomats. The "sensitive" case, which had been stalled for 20 years due to concerns that some powerful Thais would be implicated in a public investigation, had caused a severe strain on Thai-Saudi relations. "Abu Ali" (meaning "Father of Ali"), which might or might not be the suspect's real name, was described as an Arab. His whereabouts are unknown. An arrest warrant was issued and the DSI sought the aid of Interpol in apprehending the suspect. The DSI also claimed that it had no evidence that the Blue Diamond Affair "blue diamond" ever existed in the first place. The blue diamond was at the center of the gems theft case that is presumed to have caused the murders.

In August 2010, Abhisit promoted Lieutenant-General Somkid Boonthanom from chief of the Chiang Mai region to assistant national police chief. Somkid had earlier been indicted for the murder of Mohammad al-Ruwaili, a Saudi assigned to investigate the blue diamond theft. The Saudi embassy said in a statement:

The embassy is deeply concerned to learn that the high ranking officer accused in this case was further promoted in a manner that may affect the course [of] legal proceedings against the defendants...In light of these grave concerns, all current efforts and attempts by both countries to solve the pending issues directly affecting restoring bilateral relations may be seriously jeopardized.

Deputy Prime Minister Suthep Thaugsuban said he would send a letter to the Saudis which would clarify the matter. Foreign Minister Kasit Piromya met Saudi chargé d'affaires Nabil Ashri and announced he had explained everything and no letter was necessary. Abhisit then said the foreign ministry would provide a written explanation, but that the letter had to be painstakingly translated to prevent any misinterpretation. However, Abhisit then met with the chargé d'affaires Ashri and gave an interview to the press calling the Saudis misinformed. In an official statement, the Saudi's blasted Abhisit's rhetoric:

Mr Nabil Ashri expressed his astonishment to the news published about the said meeting with H.E. the Prime Minister of Thailand which portrayed the Chargé d'Affairs as "ill-informed" and according to H.E. Mr. Abhisit, that he seemed to have "insufficient information about the matter" of the promotion of Pol. Lt. Gen. Somkid Boonthanom.

Somkid then announced that he would not accept Abhisit's promotion. Suthep praised Somkid for his sacrifice and said that "His decision will make it easy to solve the problem between Thailand and Saudi Arabia."

== Political protests ==
During Abhisit’s tenure as prime minister, the United Front for Democracy Against Dictatorship (UDD), a group formed to protest the 2006 military coup, staged several protests calling for Abhisit to dissolve the government and hold new elections. The largest gatherings occurred in April 2009 and from March to May 2010, ultimately escalating into violent clashes between protestors and the military that left 91 people dead and more than 2,000 injured.

=== April 2009 protests ===
In early April, the UDD staged a mass protest in Bangkok after former Prime Minister Thaksin Shinawatra said via video broadcast that members of the privy council masterminded the 2006 military coup, and conspired with the military to ensure that Abhisit became prime minister. As the week-long Songkran (Thai New Year) holiday began, protests escalated in Bangkok. Fighting erupted between anti-government protesters, government supporters, and the general population. Abhisit declared a state of emergency for Bangkok and surrounding areas due to heightened escalation of tension and denounced the anti-government protesters as "national enemies". Abhisit also issued a decree that empowered the government to censor television broadcasts. A television journalist reported that he was ordered not to show images damaging to the military or government. Thaksin appeared on a D-Station television broadcast to appeal to King Bhumibol to intervene and end the violence. Legislation authorizing the use of emergency decrees was originally pushed through parliament in 2005 by the Thaksin government, provoking charges of authoritarianism at the time by the Democrat Party. Under the state of emergency, gatherings of more than five people were prohibited and the press was not permitted to present news which could incite worry.

On 12 April, protesters surrounded Abhisit's limousine at the Interior Ministry in Bangkok and hurling objects at his windows. Abhisit made it out safely while one of his deputies was wounded by the protesters. Government spokesman Panitan Wattanayakorn said that Abhisit's inner circle viewed the attack as a well-coordinated assassination attempt, claiming that security footage of the incident showed men with masks and guns were positioned on the perimeter of the attack, apparently waiting for protesters to break through the car's bulletproof windows.

In the pre-dawn of Monday 13 April, army soldiers cleared protesters blocking the main roads from the Din Daeng intersection near Victory Monument in central Bangkok. At least 70 people were injured. The same day, the government ordered the blocking of D Station, satellite news station that was broadcasting the clashes, claiming that the station was calling for protesters to gather in Bangkok. Several community radio stations were shut down and searched upon suspicion of supporting the UDD. Violent clashes at numerous locations in Bangkok continued while arrest warrants were issued for Thaksin and 13 protest leaders. Some protest leaders voluntarily gave themselves in to police on 14 April 2009. Afterward, the Thai government revoked Thaksin's ordinary passport.

According to government figures, more than 120 people were injured in the unrest, most of them UDD demonstrators although some military personnel, pro-government supporters, and members of the general public were also injured. At least one UDD protester died from gunshot wounds sustained during the military's attack in Din Daeng, although the Army claimed the wound was not caused by their standard firearm. The UDD later claimed that at least six demonstrators were killed in the unrest and their bodies hauled away by the military; however, they had no evidence for their claim. The dead bodies of two UDD protesters were found floating in the Chao Phraya River, their hands tied behind their backs and their bodies badly beaten, although police had yet to conclude whether their murders were politically motivated. Abhisit aide Satit Wongnontaey claimed that two government supporters were shot dead by red shirt protesters in clashes in Din Daeng, although he had no evidence for his claim. The Bangkok Metropolitan Administration estimated that it had incurred 10 million baht (approximately US$300,000) in property damages, including 31 damaged and burned buses. Standard & Poor's lowered Thailand's local currency rating to "A−" from "A", although Finance Minister Korn Chatikavanij claimed this would increase the government's borrowing cost minimally.

=== March–May 2010 protests ===
==== Background ====
In February, the UDD announced plans to hold protests calling for elections. In early February, Abhisit established 38 security centers with over 20,000 security personnel in the north and northeast to prevent the protests. Abhisit also escalated efforts to monitor and censor community radio stations, which were often used by rural residents to voice their discontent and by activists to organize protests.

On 7 February 2010, Abhisit's spokesperson compared UDD leaders to "dogs" and vowed to use the National Telecommunications Commission to crack down on red shirt community radio stations. He noted that if the current law for the NTC cannot enforce the crackdown, the government would try to pass a special law that would make such a crackdown. The NTC acting secretary-general was also a member of the government-appointed Situation Monitoring Committee in the run-up to Thaksin's February court verdict. The government claimed to foreign diplomats and foreign chambers of commerce that the UDD would "spark violence" and "intensify its agitation and step up protests in Bangkok and around the country in order to disrupt the work of the government and the judiciary." The UDD announced that it would rally against the government on 14 March.

Abhisit informed the Democrat Party-led Bangkok Metropolitan Administration that he had intelligence of planned bomb attacks in at least two locations and grenade attacks in 30–40 locations in Bangkok. When questioned about the matter, Army spokesman Colonel Sansern Kaewkamnerd said the Army had no such intelligence.

On 9 March, Abhisit imposed the Internal Security Act from 11 to 23 March and relocated his cabinet to an army base. A 50,000-strong security force was deployed on Bangkok.

The 14 March protests were the largest in Thai history, and were peaceful. However, Thailand's free-to-air TV channels, all controlled by the government or military, claimed that there were only 25,000 protesters. The protesters remained at the Rajadamnoen protest site and later started a satellite site at Rajaprasong intersection. There were dozens of bombings in Bangkok over the weeks, far from the protest areas, with nobody claiming responsibility and no arrests made. A Porsche was rammed into protester motorcycles at Rajprasong intersection, injuring several. In a separate incident, a woman rammed her car into a crowd of protesters, but drove away before she could be arrested.

Negotiations between the protesters and the government failed to result in an election date. Abhisit declared a state of emergency on the evening of 8 April.

==== Crackdown at Rajadamnoen ====
On 10 April, government troops unsuccessfully tried to take back control of Phan Fah Bridge near Rajadamnoen, killing 24 protesters, including one Japanese journalist. More than 800 people were injured. The military noted that uniformed soldiers died from cerebral edema (a swelling of the brain) after being hit on the head by a rock.

On 16 April, security forces raided a hotel attempting to arrest protest leaders who Suthep Thaugsuban called "terrorists". The protest leaders escaped before they could be captured. That same day, Abhisit relieved Suthep from his security responsibilities and replaced him with the Commander of the Royal Thai Army General Anupong Paochinda. Tensions continued to grow, as pro-government rallies started to appear alongside the anti-government ones. On 22 April, a series of explosions in Bangkok killed at least one person and injured more than 85 others, including four foreigners. At least some of the explosions were caused by grenades, which the government claimed were fired from the red shirt encampment.

==== Crackdown at Rajaprasong ====
The main protest area at Ratchaprasong intersection was surrounded with armoured vehicles and snipers in early May. The protest site was declared a "live-fire zone" and troops were ordered to shoot to kill. From 13 to 18 May, 41 civilians were killed, including one Italian journalist, and over 2,100 were injured. One military death occurred due to accidental friendly fire. Abhisit claimed that all civilians killed were either armed terrorists or civilians shot by terrorists, and noted that some civilians were shot by terrorists disguised in Army uniforms. Protest leaders handed themselves in to police and were jailed without bail. Red Shirt media was censored and dozens of prominent Red Shirts were arrested for lese majeste.

Official government investigations into the crackdowns exonerated the military and blamed the protesters and "black shirts" for the killings. Not a single black shirt was identified or charged.

=== Relationship with PAD and UDD ===
On 21 April 2009, Abhisit's government launched a media war to dispute claims made by the UDD during the April protests. He also announced the public distribution of millions of VCDs documenting the government's views on the unrest. At the time, the government's emergency and censorship decrees were still in place.

Abhisit was accused of applying disparate standards in the treatment of UDD and PAD protestors. For instance, the government was quick to issue warrants for UDD members after the outbreak of violence, even though they had yet to issue warrants for PAD protestors involved in the airport seizures that took place months earlier. In an interview with the Financial Times, Abhisit said "I can understand [the UDD] feeling the cases against PAD have been slow. The problem is that PAD action didn't take place during my administration and the process that began to investigate." When the interviewer noted that the airport sieges ended just two weeks before Abhisit came to power, he claimed that "I have summoned the police chief and expressed my concern that the case is ruling slowly and they have made some progress."

Abhisit was Democrat Party leader during the PAD protests. After Samak Sundaravej was replaced by Somchai Wongsawat, the People’s Alliance for Democracy refused to stop their protests, claiming that Somchai was a proxy for Thaksin Shinawatra. After he was named prime minister, Abhisit proposed a five-point roadmap to national reconciliation. When Abhisit was voted in by parliament 235 to 198 after Somchai Wongsawat was relieved from premiership for buying votes. Abhisit said his priority was the people, focusing mainly on the interests of the people and lower class citizens through the "People’s Agenda" policy platform, and saying the government must be "honest and truly democratic" without any conflict of interest. Leading to PAD's development of a new political party "Thien Hang Dhama", which later changed to "New Political Party" to drive their new ideology overlapping each other's political base. Claiming that Democrat party only protects their own interest and ineffectively solving the country's problem.

== Elections ==
=== By-elections and local elections ===
In the first round of by-elections after Abhisit's appointment as prime minister, the Democrat-led coalition won 20 seats out of 29 contested seats. June by-elections in Sakon Nakhon were expected to be a shoo-in for the government-member Bhum Jai Thai Party due to its control over the powerful Ministry of Interior. However, Bhum Jai Thai was roundly defeated by the Thaksin-affiliated Puea Thai Party.

Elections were held for councillors and district councillors in August 2010 for the Bangkok Metropolitan Administration, a jurisdiction where the Democrat Party traditionally dominated. The Democrat Party won, receiving 45 seats for Bangkok Metropolitan Councillors, followed by Puea Thai Party with 15 seats, and the Independent Party with one seat. For District Councillors, the Democrat Party won 210 seats, followed by Puea Thai Party with 39 seats and the Independent Party with seven seats.

=== 3 July general election ===
On 6 May 2011, after months of speculation, Abhisit submitted a royal decree to King Bhumibol to dissolve parliament. Election for the House of Representatives was set for 3 July. Election-related violence began immediately after the election date was set. Pracha Prasopdee, ex-MP for Samut Prakan Province who had won all five of the previous elections, was shot in the back on the night of 10 May. Bail was immediately revoked for opposition leaders Jatuporn Prompan and Nisit Sinthuprai for allegedly violating national security and insulting King Bhumibol after they were released from jail. The opposition leaders were originally jailed for months as part of the 2010 Thai military crackdown on protesters and had been released on bail. They lost their parliamentary immunity after parliament was dissolved.

Abhisit unveiled a slate of candidates highlighted by 30 celebrities and heirs of political families, including Chitpas Bhirombhakdi, heiress of the Singha Beer fortune and former staff member of Abhisit's secretariat office. Abhisit promised to increase the minimum wage by 25% if the Democrat Party won the election.

Nearly all polls conducted in the months prior to the election showed that the Democrat Party would gain fewer parliamentary seats than the Pheu Thai Party, and even Democrat Party Finance Minister Korn Chatikavanij admitted that, "we're doing terribly in the polls" and that, "it was obvious from the beginning" that they would not win a majority. Newin Chidchob, de facto leader of coalition partner Bhum Jai Thai Party, predicted that the Democrat Party would win only 160 out of 500 seats. Abhisit dismissed the polls, and days before the election exuded confidence that the Democrat Party would certainly win the election and form the next government. He promised to "evaluate his own performance" if the Democrat Party won fewer than 170 seats.

In his last campaign rally, Abhisit claimed that the Democrat Party was the only way that Thais would live, "under the same sky" and that a victory for Puea Thai would result in "mob rule." Abhisit positioned the election as a referendum on Thaksin. "If you want the country get rid of the poison that is Thaksin, then you should vote for us and vote for us to get more than 250 seats!"

The Democrats were defeated in the elections, winning only 159 seats compared to the 265 seats won by the Pheu Thai Party led by political novice Yingluck Shinawatra. Abhisit conceded the defeat and, on 4 July, resigned as the leader of the Democrat Party. However, on 6 August, he was re-elected as the leader of the Democrat Party with the support of 96% of those eligible to vote at the party's assembly, some 330 people including local branch leaders and MPs. Abhisit insisted that when he announced his resignation he had no plans to return to the party leadership, but pressure and support from within the party convinced him otherwise. He has also said he wants to "expand the party" and hopes to win 88 more seats at the next election.

== Accusations of corruption ==
The Abhisit government was charged in several cases of corruption, particularly related to spending under the Thai Khem Khaeng economic stimulus program. After much public pressure, Abhisit appointed Banlu Siripanich head of an investigative committee to investigate allegations within the Ministry of Public Health. Banlu's committee's findings included: bribery by a supplier of ambulances; irregularities in the purchase of UV fans; overspending on construction of building; inflated prices for machines and equipment. Public Health Minister and Democrat MP Witthaya Kaewparadai, Deputy Minister from Bhumjaithai Party Manit Nop-amornbodi (who was in charge of the projects) resigned due to the scandal.

Abhisit's Social Development and Human Security Minister also resigned due to a corruption scandal. In addition, Apirak Kosayodhin, the Democrat Party Governor of Bangkok, were indicted by the National Counter Corruption Commission on 11 November 2008 for corruption in the purchase of 6.6 billion baht of fire-fighting equipment. Apirak resigned from his office on 13 November.

Flood victims in Phatthalung Province became nauseous after eating canned fish products which were donated through the Social Development and Human Security Ministry. Opposition party spokesman, Prompong Nopparit accused Democrat Minister Vitoon Nambutr of corruption in the procurement of the fish. Democrat Minister Vitoon Nambutr insisted there were no irregularities and that the ministry did not procure it for distribution. However, he later resigned to take responsibility for this situation.

Abhisit's government came under accusations that the 26 billion baht Sufficiency Economy Community project was tainted with corruption. Abhisit replied to the accusations by suggesting that the "alleged malpractice might have originated during the period when the office was in charge of managing small, medium, and large (SML) enterprises…. The SML project was created by the Thaksin Shinawatra government."

Democrat MPs saw their personal net worth increase by 4.3 billion baht while Abhisit was prime minister. Democrat financier Kalaya Sophonphanit's personal wealth increased by 422 million baht, while the wealth of MPs Wilat Chanpitak and Chalermlak Kebsap increased by 303 and 302 million baht respectively. Ten out of 10 MPs whose wealth increased the most during Abhisit's premiership were all Democrat MPs.

=== TPI illegal donation scandal ===
In early 2009, the Democrat Party was accused by the opposition of receiving 258 million baht in illegal donations from businessman-turned-politician Prachai Leophairatana. Prachai was the founder of failed petrochemical firm TPI Polene (which was under rehabilitation under the Financial Institutions Development Fund) as well as advertising shell companies Messiah Business and Creation. In the lead-up to the 2005 general election, while Abhisit was Deputy Party Leader, TPI Polene allegedly transferred the funds to Messiah Business and Creation, which then transferred the funds to senior Democrat Party leaders and their relatives in batches of less than 2 million baht each to over 70 separate bank accounts (2 million baht is the maximum that banks can transfer without reporting to the Anti-Money Laundering Office). The opposition claimed that the Democrats never reported the donation, which was far in excess of legal limits, to the Election Commission. Abhisit denied the allegations, claiming that his party's accounts had been checked by auditors. Other Democrat Party leaders claimed that "the alleged donation never took place" and that the "party never obtained it." Receiving and using an unlawful donation could result in the dissolution of the Democrat Party and the banning of its executives from political office for violating the Political Party Act.

The Opposition raised the issue in a debate of no-confidence, and accused Abhisit of approving false account reports for 2004 and 2005 to the EC and filing false information. The government won the vote, despite the Bangkok Post calling the evidence against the Democrats "overwhelming" and even the pro-Democrat Nation called the opposition's presentation "clear-cut". However, the scandal was subsequently investigated by the Department of Special Investigation. The DSI prepared a 7,000-page report which it submitted to the Election Commission in early 2010. The EC claimed that the DSI report contained many holes.

== Popularity ==
At a parliamentary session of the House of Representatives, Abhisit claimed that he had a higher approval rating than his popular predecessor Thaksin Shinawatra.

== See also ==
- Abhisit cabinet
