= Korn Dabbaransi =

Thai politician (born 1945)

- กร ทัพพะรังสี
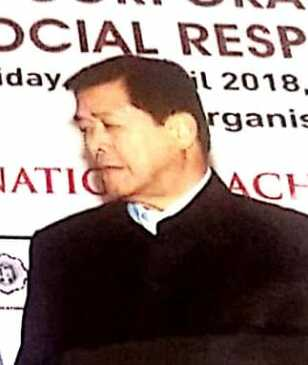
- Korn in 2018

Deputy Prime Minister of Thailand
- In office 5 March 2002 – 8 November 2003
- Prime Minister: Thaksin Shinawatra
- In office 5 October 1998 – 9 November 2000
- Prime Minister: Chuan Leekpai
- In office 25 November 1996 – 9 November 1997
- Prime Minister: Chavalit Yongchaiyudh

Minister of Science and Technology
- In office 10 March 2004 – 1 August 2005
- Prime Minister: Thaksin Shinawatra
- Preceded by: Chettha Thannajaro
- Succeeded by: Prawit Rattanapian

Minister of Public Health
- In office 5 October 1998 – 9 November 2000
- Prime Minister: Chuan Leekpai
- Preceded by: Rakkiat Sukthana
- Succeeded by: Sudarat Keyuraphan

Minister of Industry
- In office 25 November 1996 – 9 November 1997
- Prime Minister: Chavalit Yongchaiyudh
- Preceded by: Kosit Panpiemras
- Succeeded by: Somsak Thepsuthin

Minister to the Office of the Prime Minister
- In office 9 August 1988 – 9 December 1990
- Prime Minister: Banharn Silpa-archa

Personal details
- Born: 14 September 1945 (age 81) Bangkok, Thailand
- Party: Thai Nation Party (1974–92, 2007–2008); Chart Pattana (1992–2003); Thai Rak Thai (2003–2007); Pracharaj (2007)
- Spouse: Raphiphan Dabbaransi
- Education: University of Massachusetts

Korn Dabbaransi (Thai: กร ทัพพะรังสี, RTGS: Kon Thappharangsi, alternatively transcribed as Thapparangsi or Dabaransi, Thai pronunciation: [kɔːn tʰáppʰáraŋsǐː]; born 14 September 1945) is a Thai politician. He was the leader of the National Development Party from 1998 to 2003. Korn served as deputy prime minister and as a cabinet minister in several governments. He currently serves as the President of the Thai-Chinese Friendship Association.

== Family and education ==
Korn Dapparansi is a fourth generation Thai Chinese. He is a grandson of former deputy prime minister Phin Choonhavan and a nephew of former prime minister Chatichai Choonhavan. He graduated from Saint Gabriel's College and the University of Massachusetts.

== Political career ==
He entered politics in 1974, representing the Thai Nation Party of his uncles Chatichai and Pramarn Adireksarn. Korn served as Deputy Minister of Industry in the government of General Prem Tinsulanonda from 1986 to 1988. He was a minister to the Office of Prime Minister in his uncle Chatichai's cabinet from 1990 to 1991. After the military coup d'état of 1991, he was again Minister to the Office of Prime Minister in the short-lived military-backed government of Suchinda Kraprayoon. After the events of the Black May 1992, that toppled the Suchinda administration, he left the Thai Nation Party and founded the National Development Party, together with Chatichai.

In December 1994, Korn was again appointed Minister to the Office of Prime Minister by Prime Minister Chuan Leekpai, he held that position until the government lost its majority in 1995. In Chavalit Yongchaiyudh's coalition government, Korn held the position of Deputy Prime Minister and Minister of Industry from 1996 to 1997. In 1998, Korn took over the chairmanship of the National Development Party from Chatichai. In October of that year, he was made Deputy Prime Minister again under Chuan Leekpai, holding the public health portfolio additionally.

In the succeeding cabinet of Thaksin Shinawatra, Korn was again Deputy Prime Minister from March 2002 to November 2003, when Thaksin dropped the National Development Party from his coalition. Thereupon Korn defected to the Prime Minister's Thai Rak Thai Party. He was called up to the cabinet as Minister of Science and Technology again in March 2004, serving until August 2005.

In 2007, Korn left Thai Rak Thai for the Royalist People's Party (Pracharaj) of Sanoh Thienthong, became deputy leader, but resigned from the party in October of the same year, to re-join the Thai Nation Party after 15 years.

== Other offices ==
Korn was the president of the International Badminton Federation (IBF). He has been the chairman of the Thai-Chinese Friendship Association since 2002.

== Honours ==
=== National honours ===
- Knight Grand Cordon (Special Class) of the Most Exalted Order of the White Elephant (1989)
- Knight Grand Cordon (Special Class) of the Most Noble Order of the Crown of Thailand (1988)
- Serving Free People's Medal (1968)

=== Foreign honours ===
- Brunei:
  - First Class of the Most Distinguished Order of Paduka Seri Laila Jasa (2002)
- Sweden:
  - Commander Grand Cross of the Order of the Polar Star (2003)
