= Puea Pandin Party =

Thai political party

Puea Pandin Party พรรคเพื่อแผ่นดิน For Country' Party
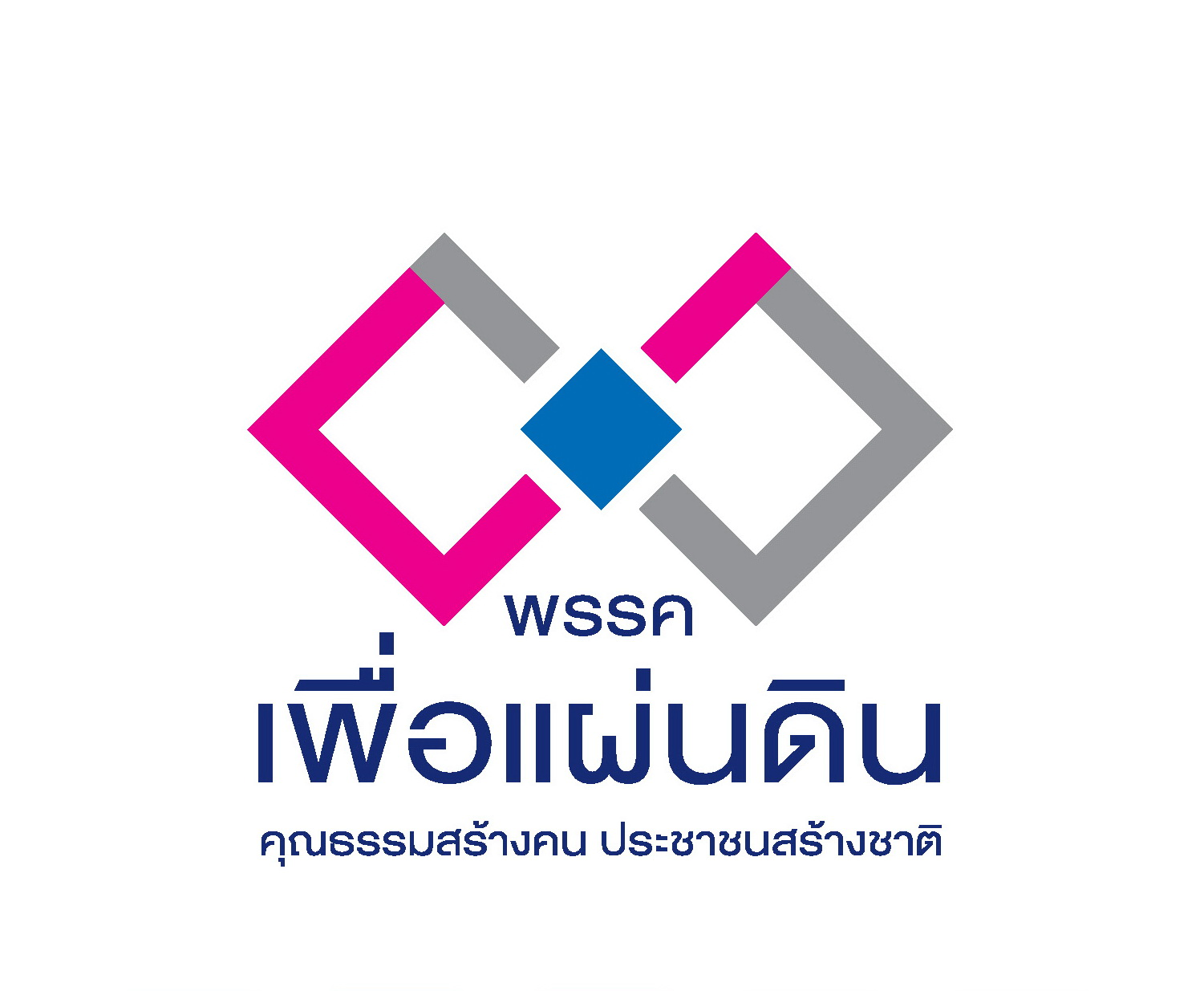
- Leader: Pramuan Ampia
- Secretary-General: Yutsaphon Sutham
- Founded: 2 October 2007
- Dissolved: 13 March 2023
- Split from: Thai Rak Thai Party
- Merged into: Chart Pattana Puea Pandin Party
- Headquarters: Don Mueang, Bangkok, Thailand
- Ideology: Thai nationalism

Website
- http://www.ppd.or.th/

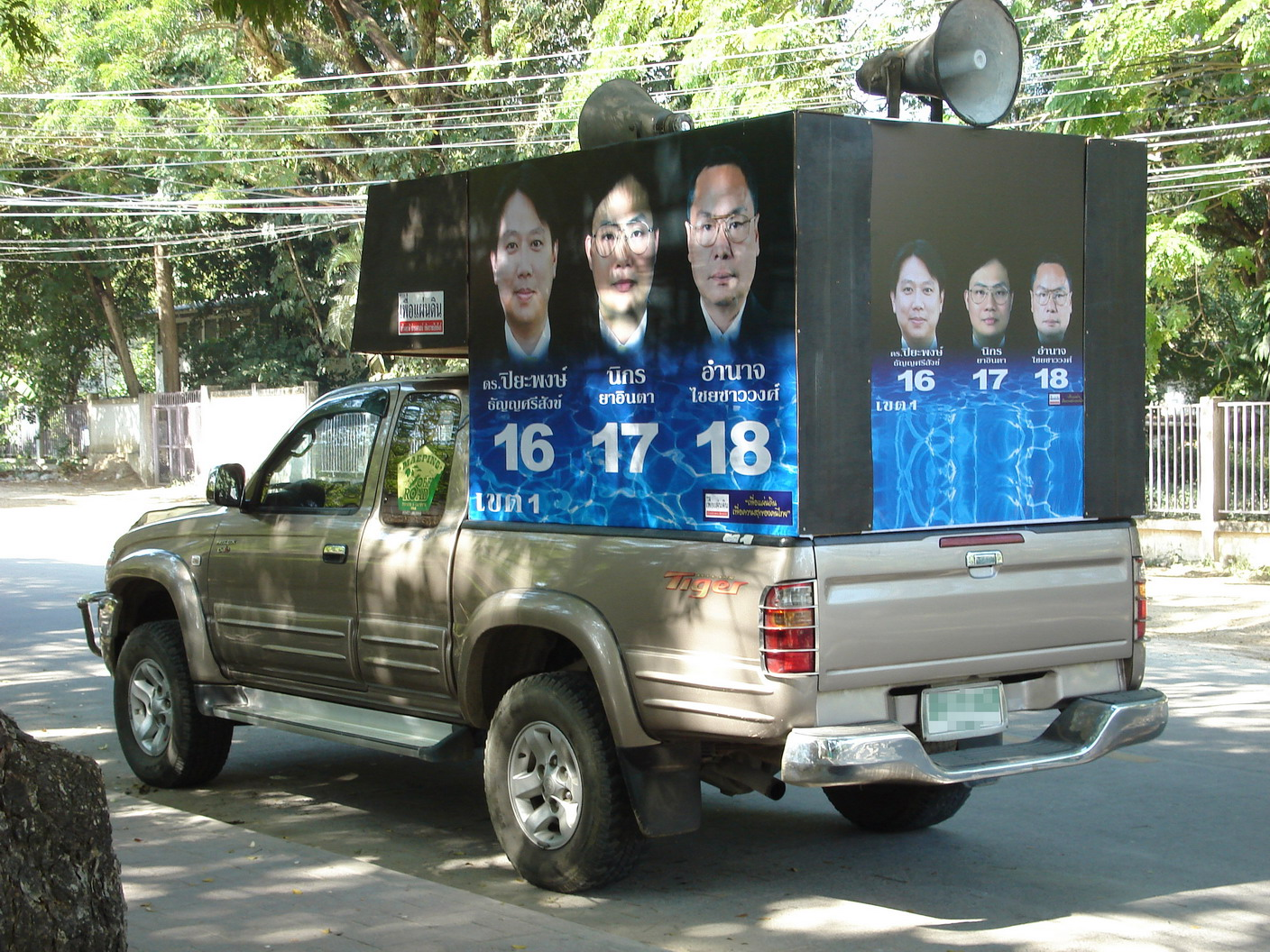
Canvassing car of the Puea Pandin Party in Chiang Mai 2007

Puea Pandin Party (Thai: พรรคเพื่อแผ่นดิน) was a Thai political party founded on 11 September 2007 by more than 200 politicians. Its most notable members included Thaksin's former foreign minister Surakiart Sathirathai, Suranand Vejjajiva and Preecha Laohaphongchana.

== Background and formation ==
Puea Pandin presented itself as a compromise party, a neutral and moderate alternative to the two main rivals, the Democrat Party and the People's Power Party (PPP). It included both former allies and opponents of deposed prime minister Thaksin Shinawatra and his outlawed Thai Rak Thai Party (TRT). Suwit Khunkitti and Watchara Punnachet were elected party leader and party secretary general respectively. The party appointed Vatana Asavahame as the party chairman, and Police General Pracha Promnok as party chief adviser. General Pallop Pinmanee, adviser to the Internal Security Command Operation, accepted to become adviser to the party, overseeing security.

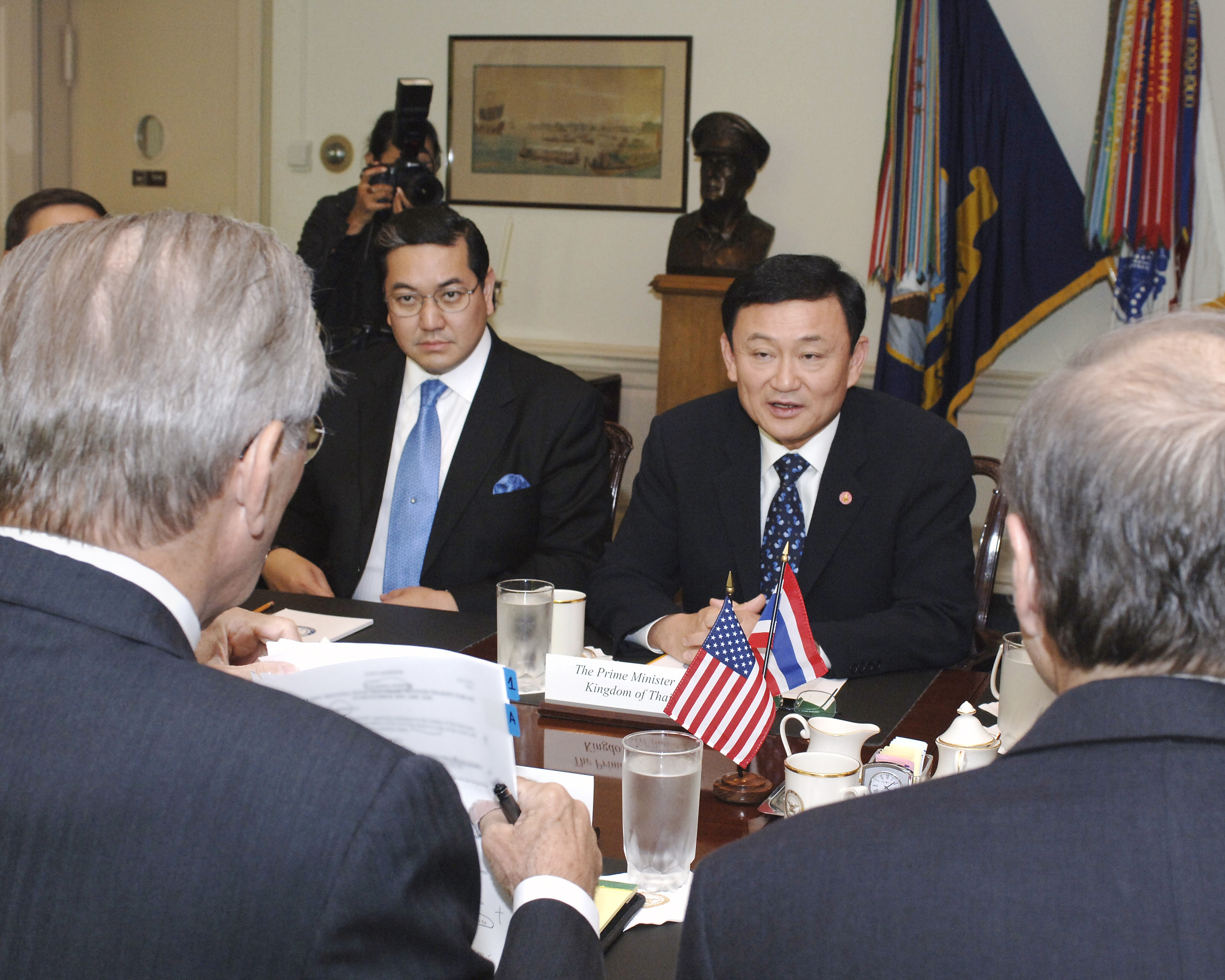
Thaksin (right) with Foreign Minister Surakiart Sathirathai (left) at Rumsfeld in Pentangon, 2005

== 2007 election ==
At the party's first caucus, Puea Pandin leader Suwit Khunkitti vowed to win more than 60 seats in Parliament and promised to implement nine policies to improve the state of the Thai economy. By 28 October 2007, the party had formed its finance and tourism team in the form of the party's Academic Council, chaired by former Deputy Prime Minister, Surakiart Sathirathai. Members included former Governor of the Bank of Thailand Vijit Supinich, former Secretary to the Ministry of Finance Supachai Pisitvanit, former Secretary to the Ministry of Agriculture and Cooperatives Bunpod Hongthong and Finance specialists Vichien Techapaiboon and Nithit Pukkanasud. Although Surakiart Sathirathai was one of 111 TRT executives banned from politics for five years, he said that the party's Academic Council only provides policy guidelines and is not part of the political party. The tourism team was led by former Tourism Authority of Thailand Governor Juthamas Siriwan and former senators Suradej Yasawat and Jirayu Vasurut. All three were also deputy party leaders. Their main policy was to make Thailand a hub for tourism with expected earnings of 1.33 trillion baht in 2011.

Three days before the 2007 general election, deputy party leader Juthamas Siriwan resigned from the party amidst a bribery scandal stemming from her tenure as governor of the Tourism Authority of Thailand and president of the Bangkok International Film Festival.

In the election, the party won 24 seats in parliament: seven party-list candidates and 17 constituency candidates. Most of them were elected in districts in the Northeastern Region (Isan), especially in the provinces of Nakhon Ratchasima and Surin. The party became a junior partner in the government coalition led by Samak Sundaravej and his PPP. Its representation increased to 32 seats after the Constitutional Court dissolved the PPP in the 2008 political crisis and its members defected to other parties. Puea Pandin then changed its allegiance and helped to elect Abhisit Vejjajiva of the Democrat Party prime minister.

== Since 2011 ==
Many Puea Pandin's members of parliament defected to other parties ahead of the election in 2011, hoping to increase their chances of being re-elected. By the end of the 2007-2011 term, 12 of the 32 Puea Pandin MPs had joined the Bhumjaithai Party, three had defected to Pheu Thai, two to the Democrats, two to Chartthaipattana, and one each to Matubhum and Tankun Pandin. The remaining nine representatives joined forces with their Chart Pattana Party colleagues, running under the new Chart Pattana Puea Pandin Party and winning 7 of 500 seats.

After conflicts between the two parties, Puea Pandin returned to contest the 2014 general election on its own, but the election was declared invalid by the Constitutional Court. In the following 2019 general election, the party failed to gain seats.

On 13 March 2023 the Election Commission of Thailand approved the dissolution of the party.
