= Tewan Liptapallop =

Thai politician (born 1959)

- เทวัญ ลิปตพัลลภ
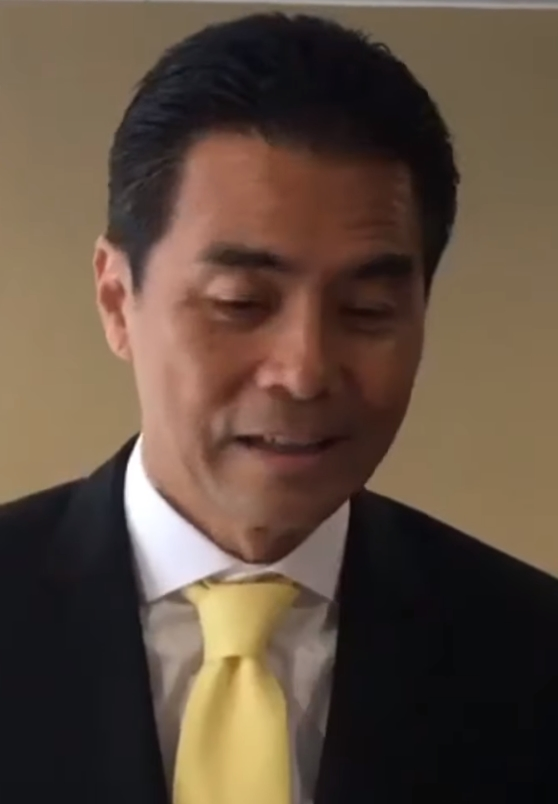
- Tewan Liptapanlob in 2019

Adviser to the Prime Minister of Thailand
- Incumbent
- Assumed office 15 September 2023
- Prime Minister: Srettha Thavisin

Minister to the Office of the Prime Minister
- In office 10 July 2019 – 20 July 2020
- Prime Minister: Prayut Chan-o-cha
- Preceded by: Kobsak Pootrakool; Suwaphan Tanyuvardhana
- Succeeded by: Anucha Nakasai

Leader of the Chart Pattana Party
- Incumbent
- Assumed office 21 August 2023
- Preceded by: Korn Chatikavanij (Chart Pattana Kla Party)
- In office 21 November 2018 – 15 October 2022
- Preceded by: Wannarat Channukul
- Succeeded by: Korn Chatikavanij (Chart Pattana Kla Party)

Personal details
- Born: 29 December 1959 (age 66) Chom Bueng, Ratchaburi, Thailand
- Party: Chart Pattana Party
- Relatives: Suwat Liptapanlop (brother)
- Education: Chulalongkorn University

Tewan Liptapallop (Thai: เทวัญ ลิปตพัลลภ, RTGS: Thewan Liptaphanlop; born 29 December 1959) is a Thai politician. He served from 10 July 2019 to 20 July 2020 as the Prime Minister's Office Minister in the second cabinet of Prime Minister Prayut Chan-o-cha.

== Early life and education ==
Tewan Liptapallop was born on December 29, 1959. He is the younger brother of Suwat Liptapanlop. Tewan graduated with a Bachelor of Law degree from Chulalongkorn University.

== Political career ==
Tewan entered politics by being elected a member of the House of Representatives for the first time in March 1992 under the Justice Unity Party and has been elected a total of 3 times. In 2007, he was disqualified from politics for five years for serving as a member of the executive committee of the Thai Rak Thai Party. In 2018, Tewan was elected as the leader of the Chart Pattana Party.

== Royal decorations ==
- 2005 - Knight Grand Cordon (Special Class) of The Most Noble Order of the Crown of Thailand
- 2020 - Knight Grand Cordon (Special Class) of the Most Exalted Order of the White Elephant
