= Thais United =

Thais United พรรครวมใจไทย
- Chairman: Chettha Thannajaro
- Secretary-General: Pradit Pattaraprasit
- Founded: 26 June 2007
- Dissolved: 3 October 2007
- Headquarters: Bangkok

Thais United (Thai: รวมใจไทย, Ruam Jai Thai; also translated as United Thai Heart, Thai Unity and United Hearts Thai) was a political party in Thailand founded on 26 June 2007. Its members included many well-known politicians, among them former deputy prime minister Somkid Jatusripitak (and 110 other former Thai Rak Thai party executives), former Democrat Party secretary-general Pradit Pattaraprasit, former Bangkok governor Bhichit Rattakul, former Thai Rak Thai member Pravich Rattanapian, former Stock of Exchange president Kittiratt Na-Ranong, former Mahachon Party leader Anek Laothamatas, Chaianan Samudavanija (a staunch critic of former premier Thaksin Shinawatra) and economics lecturer Somjai Phagaphasvivat.

In September 2007, it was announced that it had merged with the National Development Party to form a joint party, provisionally named Thais United National Development Party.

== Leadership ==
- Party leader: Chettha Thannajaro
- Secretary general: Pradit Pattaraprasit
- Party spokesperson: Wannarat Channukul
