= Poonpirom Liptapanlop =

Thai politician

Poonpirom Liptapanlop, also known as Madam Ting, is a Thailand politician who serves as minister of Energy in 2008. She is married to Thailand's former deputy prime minister Suwat Liptapanlop, who was banned from politics for five years after the Thai Rak Thai Party was dissolved by military coup and found guilty of election fraud in 2007.

== See also ==
- List of female cabinet ministers of Thailand
- Suwat Liptapanlop
