= Chart Pattana Party (2007) =

Thai political party

Chart Pattana Party พรรคชาติพัฒนา
- Abbreviation: CPN
- Leader: Tewan Liptapanlop
- Chairperson: Suwat Liptapanlop
- Secretary-General: Prasart Tanprasert
- Spokesperson: Yaowapa Boorapolchai
- Founded: 3 October 2007
- Merger of: Thais United (Ruam Jai Thai Chart Pattana Party); Puea Pandin Party (Chart Pattana Puea Pandin Party); Kla Party (Chart Pattana Kla Party)
- Split from: Thai Rak Thai Party
- Preceded by: National Development Party
- Merged into: Pheu Thai Party (de facto)
- Headquarters: Mueang, Nakhon Ratchasima
- Membership (2021): 12,746
- Ideology: Populism; Localism
- Political position: Centre
- Colors: Red Blue and Yellow
- House of Representatives: 3 / 500

The Chartpattana Party commonly known as the Chart Pattana Party (Thai: พรรคชาติพัฒนา, lit. 'National Development Party') is a populist political party in Thailand. In the 2007 Thai general election, the advisory chairman of the party was Wannarat Channukul. His brother-in-law, the party's chairman Suwat Liptapanlop, is however considered its de facto leader. The party tends to have most of its vote share focused in Nakhon Ratchasima province.

== History ==
It was founded under the name of Ruam Jai Thai Chart Pattana (lit. 'Thais United National Development Party') as a merger of Thais United and the former National Development Party in September 2007. In the 2007 Thai general election, the party received enough votes to gain eight out of 480 seats in the House of Representatives of Thailand. After 2008, the party was a member of the six-party coalition government led by the Democrat Party's leader, Prime Minister Abhisit Vejjajiva. The party's leader Wannarat Channukul was Minister of Energy in Abhisit's cabinet. The party name was shortened to Ruam Chart Pattana.

In 2011, the Ruam Chart Pattana Party merged with the Puea Pandin Party and changed its name to Chart Pattana Puea Pandin. In the election on 3 July 2011, the party won 7 of the 500 seats in the House of Representatives, five constituency-based and two on the party list. Four of its constituencies were in Nakhon Ratchasima, the party's stronghold and home province of its leaders. After the elections and Pheu Thai Party's victory, the party agreed with Pheu Thai and three other minor parties to form a coalition government under the leadership of Yingluck Shinawatra. Later in 2011, the party name was again simplified to its current version.

Thai tennis player Paradorn Srichaphan and taekwando athlete Yaowapa Boorapolchai joined the Chart Pattana Party to run in the 2011 elections.

Sophon Kaosoo, 50, a Chart Pattana Party candidate, was killed while campaigning in the local council elections, due to take place on 2 March 2014. Police believe that the assassination was most likely politically motivated.

Later, at the 2/2022 Extraordinary Annual General Meeting on Monday, 26 September 2022 in Nakhon Ratchasima Province, the meeting resolved to change the party regulations and the name of the party to the Chart Pattana Kla Party. At the same time, there was also a resolution to elect Korn Chatikavanij, former leader of Kla Party, to be a member of the party's executive committee.

The party won only two seats in the 2023 general election. Korn announced on 25 June 2023 that he had resigned his leadership position. The party will elect a new leader and executive committee in early August 2023.

On 25 April 2024, the Chart Pattana Kla Party held the 2024 Annual General Meeting to elect the Party Executive Committee for 2 vacant deputy party leader positions. The meeting resolved to elect Wutthipong Thonglao, Prachinburi MP. and Aran Phanthumchinda, former deputy secretary-general of the party is the deputy leader of the party Along with the amendment of the party regulations, the party name was changed back to Chart Pattana Party Including changing the party logo.

== General election results ==
Election	Total seats won	Total votes	Share of votes	Outcome of election	Election leader
Ruam Jai Thai Chart Pattana Party era
2007	9 / 500	948,544	2.60%	▲9 seats; Coalition party	Chettha Thanajaro
Ruam Chart Pattana Party era
Chart Pattana Puea Pandin Party era
2011	7 / 500	495,762	1.48%	▼2 seats; Coalition party	Wannarat Channukul
Chart Pattana Party era
2014	Invalidated	Invalidated	Invalidated	Unconstitutional - nullified	Suwat Liptapanlop
2019	2 / 500	252,044	0.70%	▼5 seats; Coalition party	Suwat Liptapanlop
Chart Pattana Kla Party era
2023	2 / 500	212,676	0.56%	0 seats; Coalition party	Korn Chatikavanij
Chart Pattana Party era
