= National Development Party (Thailand) =

Thai political party

National Development Party พรรคชาติพัฒนา
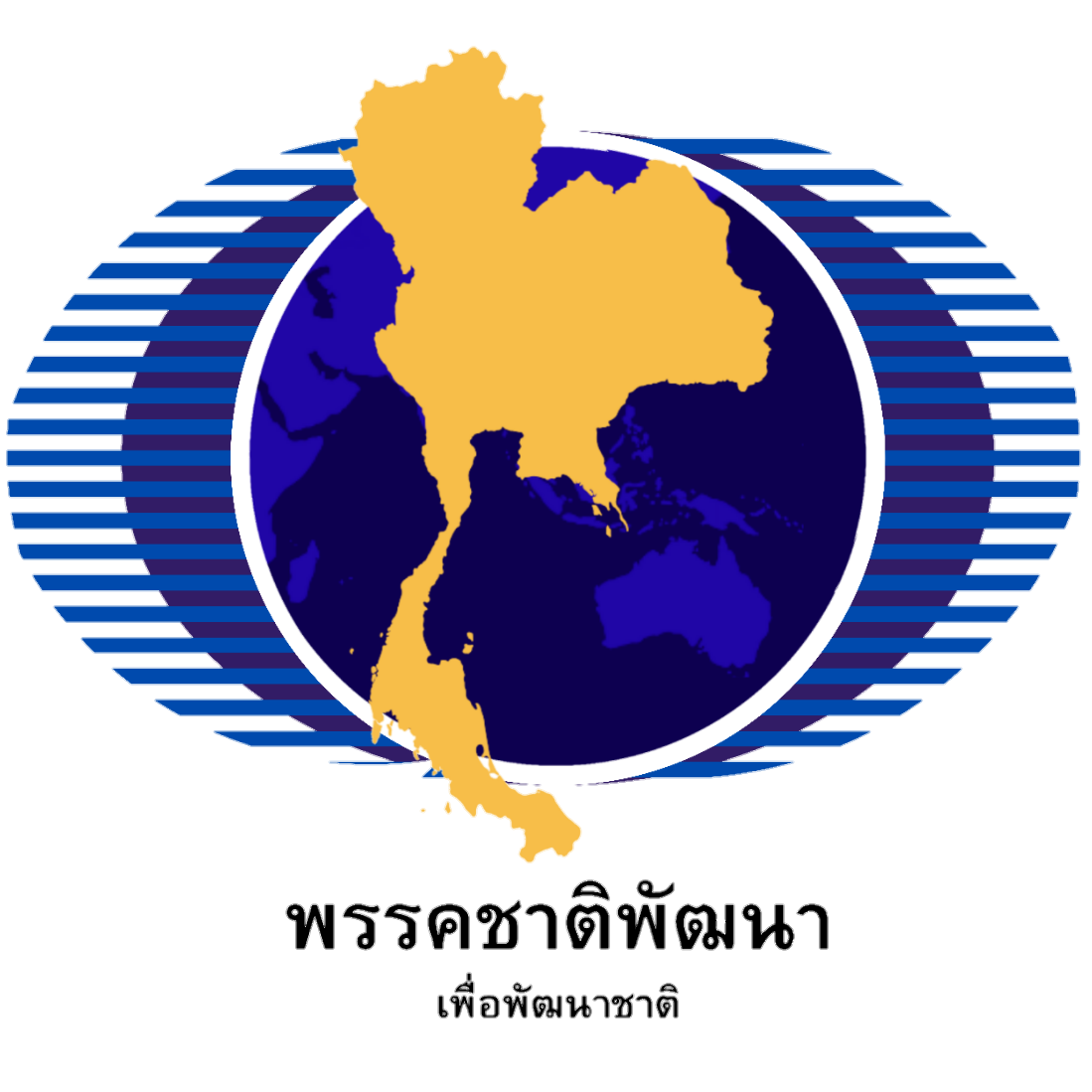
- Leader: Chatichai Choonhavan (first); Suwat Liptapanlop (last)
- Founded: 20 April 1982 (Thai People's Party) 24 May 1992 (Chart Pattana Party)
- Dissolved: 31 August 2004
- Split from: Thai Nation Party
- Merged into: Thai Rak Thai Party
- Succeeded by: Chart Pattana Party
- Headquarters: Bangkok

The National Development Party (Thai: พรรคชาติพัฒนา, RTGS: Phak Chat Pattana) was a Thai political party that existed from 1992 until its merger into Thai Rak Thai Party in 2004. After the dissolution of the Thai Rak Thai Party in 2007, the National Development group merged into the Ruam Jai Thai Chart Pattana Party.

It was founded by the former prime minister Chatichai Choonhavan. During the 1990s, it was among the country's four strongest parties. Like other Thai parties, it consisted of internal factions and lacked a strong organisation. It had no political ideology, but served the personal interests of its opportunistic leaders. It was often affected by defections to other parties. The heartland of the National Development Party was the Northeastern region (Isan).

== Establishment ==
Legally, the National Development Party was the successor of the Thai People's Party established by General Arthit Kamlang-ek in 1982. By 1992, it was only an empty shell, as General Arthit and all notable members had abandoned it. Shortly ahead of the elections in September 1992, Chatichai Choonhavan, who had been prime minister until the military coup d'état in 1991, and a group of other Thai Nation Party politicians around Chatichai's nephew Korn Dabbaransi took over the party and renamed it. The establishment followed a rupture in the Thai Nation Party, whose leadership around Somboon Rahong and secretary general Banharn Silpa-archa had stood at the side of the military junta (NPKC) during the popular protests and bloody crackdown of Black May. Therefore, the Thai Nation Party was considered one of the "devil parties". A faction of Thai Nation deputies around Chatichai's cousin Korn Dabbaransi felt uncomfortable with this policy and persuaded Chatichai to leave the party. The new party was set up as a vehicle to support a second premiership for Chatichai. They were joined by members of the likewise military-allied Justice Unity Party who now wanted to disassociate themselves from the junta. They included General Arthit Kamlang-ek (who thus returned to his original party), Somchai Khunpluem ("Kamnan Poh", or the "Godfather of Chonburi") and Suwat Liptapanlop, an entrepreneur from Nakhon Ratchasima. Moreover, the party could win over Democrat Party secretary general Prachuab Chaisarn.

Chatichai stressed the fact that his party had nothing to do with the military junta and the Black May events. He presented it as a new party which consisted mainly of younger lawmakers, espoused democracy and took a neutral position in the polarised political spectrum. The party succeeded in winning financially strong sponsors and win over politicians from other parties. In the September 1992 election, the party won 60 seats and thus become the third strongest force countrywide. It joined the government coalition led by Chuan Leekpai but left it again after less than a year.

== Thaksin government ==
In December 2001, the National Development Party, which had been the largest opposition party, joined the coalition government of Prime Minister Thaksin Shinawatra. Thaksin dropped the party from the coalition in November 2003. Therefore, several politicians left the National Development Party to join Thaksin's Thai Rak Thai Party Thaksin exerted further pressure and before the 2005 election, the party had merged into the Thai Rak Thai Party.

After the 2006 coup d'état, the Constitutional Tribunal dissolved the Thai Rak Thai Party in May 2007, and in September the National Development Group merged with Thais United to form the Ruam Jai Thai Chart Pattana Party.

== Leaders ==
- Chatichai Choonhavan (1992-1998)
- Korn Dabbaransi (1998-2003)
- Suwat Liptapanlop (2003-2005)
