= First Prayut cabinet =

Government of Thailand from 2014 to 2019

- 61st Council of Ministers of Thailand
- 2014–2019
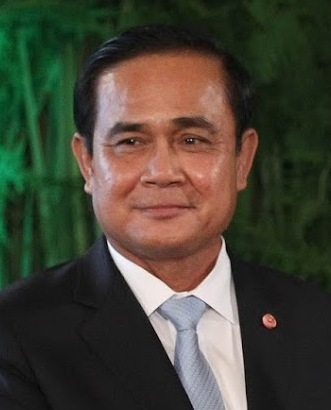
- Date formed: 30 August 2014
- Date dissolved: 10 July 2019

People and organisations
- Monarch: Bhumibol Adulyadej (until 13 October 2016); Vajiralongkorn (since 13 October 2016)
- Prime Minister: Prayut Chan-o-cha
- Prime Minister's history: 2014–2019
- Deputy Prime Ministers: First appointment (31 August 2014): Prawit Wongsuwan; Pridiyathorn Devakula (until 19 August 2015); Yongyuth Yuthavong (until 19 August 2015); Thanasak Patimaprakorn (until 23 November 2017); Wissanu Krea-ngam; Second appointment (19 August 2015): Prajin Juntong (until 8 May 2019); Narong Pipathanasai (until 23 November 2017); Somkid Jatusripitak; Third appointment (23 November 2017): Chatchai Sarikulya (until 8 May 2019)
- No. of ministers: 17
- Total no. of members: 68
- Status in legislature: Military government

History
- Legislature term: 2014 National Legislative Assembly
- Budgets: 2015 budget; 2016 budget; 2017 budget; 2018 budget; 2019 budget
- Predecessor: Yingluck cabinet
- Successor: Second Prayut cabinet

The First Prayut cabinet, formally known as the 61st Council of Ministers (คณะรัฐมนตรีไทย คณะที่ 61), was formed on 30 August 2014. General Prayut Chan-o-cha, the coup leader against then Prime Minister Yingluck Shinawatra's caretaker government and later appointed as leader of the National Council for Peace and Order, was elected as prime minister on 21 August 2014 and received the appointment from the royal command on 24 August 2014.

== Election of the prime minister ==
21 August 2014; Nomination of Prayut Chan-o-cha (Ind.) as Prime Minister; Absolute majority: 99/197
Vote	Votes
Yes	191 / 197
No	0 / 197
Abstain	3 / 197
Not voting	3 / 197

== Lists of Ministers ==
Portfolio	Minister (Deputy Minister)	Term		Refs.
Portfolio	Minister (Deputy Minister)	Took office	Left office	Refs.
Prime Minister	Prayut Chan-o-cha	24 August 2014	9 June 2019	
Deputy Prime Ministers	Prawit Wongsuwan	30 August 2014	10 July 2019	
Deputy Prime Ministers	Pridiyathorn Devakula	30 August 2014	19 August 2015	
Deputy Prime Ministers	Yongyuth Yuthavong	30 August 2014	19 August 2015	
Deputy Prime Ministers	Thanasak Patimaprakorn	30 August 2014	23 November 2017	
Deputy Prime Ministers	Wissanu Krea-ngam	30 August 2014	10 July 2019	
Deputy Prime Ministers	Prajin Juntong	19 August 2015	8 May 2019	
Deputy Prime Ministers	Narong Pipatanasai	19 August 2015	23 November 2017	
Deputy Prime Ministers	Somkid Jatusripitak	19 August 2015	10 July 2019	
Deputy Prime Ministers	Chatchai Sarikulya	23 November 2017	8 May 2019	
Office of the Prime Minister	Panadda Diskul	30 August 2014	15 December 2016	
Office of the Prime Minister	Suwaphan Tanyuvardhana	30 August 2014	15 December 2016	
Office of the Prime Minister	Ormsin Chivapruck	15 December 2016	23 November 2017	
Office of the Prime Minister	Suvit Maesincee	15 December 2016	23 November 2017	
Office of the Prime Minister	Suwaphan Tanyuvardhana	23 November 2017	8 May 2019	
Office of the Prime Minister	Kobsak Pootrakool	23 November 2017	29 January 2019	
Minister of Defence	Prawit Wongsuwan	30 August 2014	10 July 2019	
Minister of Defence	Udomdej Sitabutr	30 August 2014	23 November 2017	
Minister of Defence	Chinchan Changmongkon	23 November 2017	10 July 2019	
Minister of Finance	Sommai Phasee	30 August 2014	19 August 2015	
Minister of Finance	Apisak Tantivorawong	19 August 2015	10 July 2019	
Minister of Finance	Wisudhi Srisuphan	18 November 2014	8 May 2019	
Minister of Foreign Affairs	Thanasak Patimaprakorn	30 August 2014	19 August 2015	
Minister of Foreign Affairs	Don Pramudwinai	19 August 2015	10 July 2019	
Minister of Foreign Affairs	Don Pramudwinai	30 August 2014	19 August 2015	
Minister of Foreign Affairs	Weerasak Futrakul	15 December 2016	8 May 2019	
Minister of Tourism and Sports	Kobkarn Wattanavrangkul	30 August 2014	23 November 2017	
Minister of Tourism and Sports	Weerasak Kowsurat	23 November 2017	8 May 2019	
Minister of Social Development and Human Security	Adul Saengsingkaew	30 August 2014	23 November 2017	
Minister of Social Development and Human Security	Anantaporn Kanchanarat	23 November 2017	8 May 2019	
Minister of Science and Technology (Merged under the Ministry of Higher; Education, Science, Research and Innovation on 2 May 2019)	Pichet Durongkaveroj	30 August 2014	15 December 2016	
Minister of Science and Technology (Merged under the Ministry of Higher; Education, Science, Research and Innovation on 2 May 2019)	Atchaka Sibunruang	15 December 2016	23 November 2017	
Minister of Science and Technology (Merged under the Ministry of Higher; Education, Science, Research and Innovation on 2 May 2019)	Suvit Maesincee	23 November 2017	8 May 2019	
Minister of Agriculture and Cooperatives	Pitipong Phungbun na Ayutthaya	30 August 2014	19 August 2015	
Minister of Agriculture and Cooperatives	Chatchai Sarikulya	19 August 2015	23 November 2017	
Minister of Agriculture and Cooperatives	Krisada Boonyarat	23 November 2017	10 July 2019	
Minister of Agriculture and Cooperatives	Amnuay Patise	18 November 2014	19 August 2015	
Minister of Agriculture and Cooperatives	Chutima Bunyapraphasara	15 December 2016	23 November 2017	
Minister of Agriculture and Cooperatives	Luck Wajananawat	23 November 2017	9 May 2019	
Minister of Agriculture and Cooperatives	Wiwat Salyakamthorn	23 November 2017	10 July 2019	
Minister of Transport	Prajin Juntong	30 August 2014	19 August 2015	
Minister of Transport	Arkhom Termpittayapaisith	19 August 2015	10 July 2019	
Minister of Transport	Arkhom Termpittayapaisith	30 August 2014	19 August 2015	
Minister of Transport	Ormsin Chivapruck	19 August 2015	15 December 2016	
Minister of Transport	Pichit Akrathit	15 December 2016	23 November 2017	
Minister of Transport	Pailin Chuchottaworn	23 November 2017	10 July 2019	
Minister of Digital Economy and Society (Formerly Ministry of Information and Communication Technology)	Pornchai Rujiprapa	30 August 2014	19 August 2015	
Minister of Digital Economy and Society (Formerly Ministry of Information and Communication Technology)	Uttama Savanayana	19 August 2015	12 September 2016	
Minister of Digital Economy and Society (Formerly Ministry of Information and Communication Technology)	Pichet Durongkaveroj	15 December 2016	10 July 2019	
Minister of Natural Resources and Environment	Dapong Ratanasuwan	30 August 2014	19 August 2015	
Minister of Natural Resources and Environment	Surasak Karnjanarat	19 August 2015	8 May 2019	
Minister of Energy	Narongchai Akrasanee	30 August 2014	19 August 2015	
Minister of Energy	Anantaporn Kanchanarat	19 August 2015	23 November 2017	
Minister of Energy	Siri Jirapongphan	23 November 2017	10 July 2019	
Minister of Commerce	Chatchai Sarikulya	30 August 2014	19 August 2015	
Minister of Commerce	Apiradi Tantraporn	19 August 2015	23 November 2017	
Minister of Commerce	Sontirat Sontijirawong	23 November 2017	29 January 2019	
Minister of Commerce	Apiradi Tantraporn	30 August 2014	19 August 2015	
Minister of Commerce	Suvit Maesincee	19 August 2015	15 December 2016	
Minister of Commerce	Sonthirat Sonthijirawong	15 December 2016	23 November 2017	
Minister of Commerce	Chutima Bunyapraphasara	23 November 2017	10 July 2019	
Minister of Interior	Anupong Paochinda	30 August 2014	10 July 2019	
Minister of Interior	Sutee Markboon	30 August 2014	8 May 2019	
Minister of Justice	Paiboon Khumchaya	30 August 2014	6 December 2016	
Minister of Justice	Suwaphan Tanyuvardhana	15 December 2016	23 November 2017	
Minister of Justice	Prajin Juntong	23 November 2017	8 May 2019	
Minister of Labour	Surasak Karnjanarat	30 August 2014	19 August 2015	
Minister of Labour	Sirichai Distakul	19 August 2015	1 November 2017	
Minister of Labour	Adul Saengsingkaew	23 November 2017	8 May 2019	
Minister of Culture	Veera Rojpojanarat	30 August 2014	10 July 2019	
Minister of Education	Narong Pipatanasai	30 August 2014	19 August 2015	
Minister of Education	Dapong Ratanasuwan	19 August 2015	6 December 2016	
Minister of Education	Teerakiat Jaroensettasin	15 December 2016	8 May 2019	
Minister of Education	Krissanapong Kiratikara	30 August 2014	19 August 2015	
Minister of Education	Surachet Chaiwong	30 August 2014	8 May 2019	
Minister of Education	Teerakiat Jaroensettasin	19 August 2015	15 December 2016	
Minister of Education	Panadda Diskul	15 December 2016	23 November 2017	
Minister of Education	Udom Kachintorn	23 November 2017	8 May 2019	
Minister of Public Health	Rajata Rajatanavin	30 August 2014	19 August 2015	
Minister of Public Health	Piyasakol Sakolsatayadorn	19 August 2015	10 July 2019	
Minister of Public Health	Somsak Chunharas	30 August 2014	19 August 2015	
Minister of Industry	Chakramon Phasukavanich	30 August 2014	19 August 2015	
Minister of Industry	Atchaka Sibunruang	19 August 2015	15 December 2016	
Minister of Industry	Uttama Savanayana	15 December 2016	29 January 2019	
Minister of Industry	Somchai Harnhirun	23 November 2017	8 May 2019	

== Disclosure of interest ==
=== 2014 asset disclosures ===
In October 2014 Thailand's National Counter-Corruption Commission (NCCC) made public the assets of the prime minister and his cabinet. One-third of the ministers are worth more than 100 million baht.

The prime minister declared 128 million baht (US$4 million) in net assets and 645,754 baht (US$19,676) in debts. Deputy Prime Minister Pridiyathon Devakula, the wealthiest cabinet member, declared 1,378 million baht (US$42 million) in assets with no debt. Next is Panadda Diskul, who runs the Office of the Prime Minister, who declared 1,315 million baht (US$40 million) in assets and no debt. The least wealthy cabinet member is Education Minister Narong Pipatanasai with 6.95 million baht (US$211,696) in assets and 2.92 million baht (US$88,000) in debt.

== See also ==
- National Council for Peace and Order
- Second Prayut cabinet
