= Suvit Maesincee =

Thai politician

- สุวิทย์ เมษินทรีย์
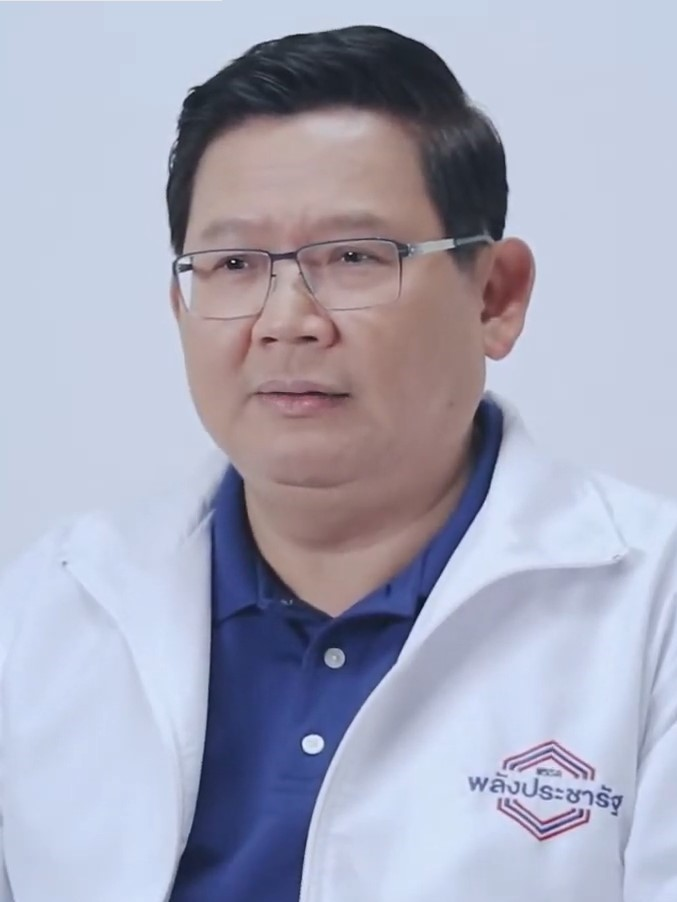

Minister of Higher Education, Science, Research and Innovation
- In office 10 July 2019 – 15 July 2020
- Prime Minister: Prayut Chan-o-cha
- Preceded by: Position established
- Succeeded by: Anek Laothamatas

Minister of Science and Technology
- In office 23 November 2017 – 23 January 2019
- Prime Minister: Prayut Chan-o-cha
- Preceded by: Atchaka Sibunruang
- Succeeded by: Position dissolved

Minister to the Office of the Prime Minister
- In office 15 December 2016 – 23 November 2017 Serving with Ormsin Chivapruck
- Prime Minister: Prayut Chan-o-cha
- Preceded by: Suwaphan Tanyuvardhana; Panadda Diskul
- Succeeded by: Suwaphan Tanyuvardhana; Kobsak Pootrakool

Personal details
- Born: 12 May 1961 (age 65) Bangkok, Thailand
- Party: Sang Anakot Thai (2022—present)
- Other political affiliations: Palang Pracharath Party (2018–2020)
- Spouse: Pakakrong Maesincee
- Education: Mahidol University; NIDA; Kellogg
- Profession: Politician; pharmacist

Suvit Maesincee (Thai: สุวิทย์ เมษินทรีย์, RTGS: Suwit Mesinsi; born 12 May 1961) is a former Thai politician. He served as the first Minister of Higher Education, Science, Research and Innovation in the second cabinet of Prime Minister Prayut Chan-o-cha. Anek Laothamatas was appointed as his successor. On 19 January 2022, Maesincee joined the newly formed party Sang Anakot Thai (Building Thailand's Future), founded by Uttama Savanayana and Sontirat Sontijirawong.

== Early life and education ==
Suwit Maesincee was born on 12 May 1961 in Bangkok. He graduated from high school from Debsirin School. Then he graduated bachelor's degree in Pharmacy from the Faculty of Pharmacy, Mahidol University and master's degree in Marketing From the Faculty of Business Administration, National Institute of Development Administration and a Ph.D. in marketing from Kellogg School of Management, Northwestern University, USA.

== Careers ==
Suvit Maesincee used to serve as a Director of the Institute for Good Governance Promotion and is the Director of The Siam Industrial Gases Association (SIGA). He was an advisor to Deputy Prime Minister Somkid Jatusripitak.

After the 2014 Thai coup d'état, Suvit was appointed a member of the National Reform Council. Later in August 2015, Suwit Maesincee was appointed Deputy Minister of Commerce in the government of Prayut Chan-o-cha. Then, in December 2016, he was appointed Minister of the Prime Minister's Office. He was appointed as the last Minister of Science and Technology on 23 November 2017 and resigned from his position on 29 January 2019 due to the dissolution of the ministry. Then he was appointed as Minister of Higher Education, Science, Research, and Innovation being the first person in the position for this newly established ministry.
