= Prayut cabinet =

Prayut cabinet may refer to:

- First Prayut cabinet, the Thai government led by Prayut Chan-o-cha from 30 August 2014 to 16 July 2019
- Second Prayut cabinet, the Thai government led by Prayut Chan-o-cha from 16 July 2019 to 1 September 2023
