= Second Prayut cabinet =

Government of Thailand from 2019 to 2023

- 62nd Council of Ministers of Thailand
- 2019–2023
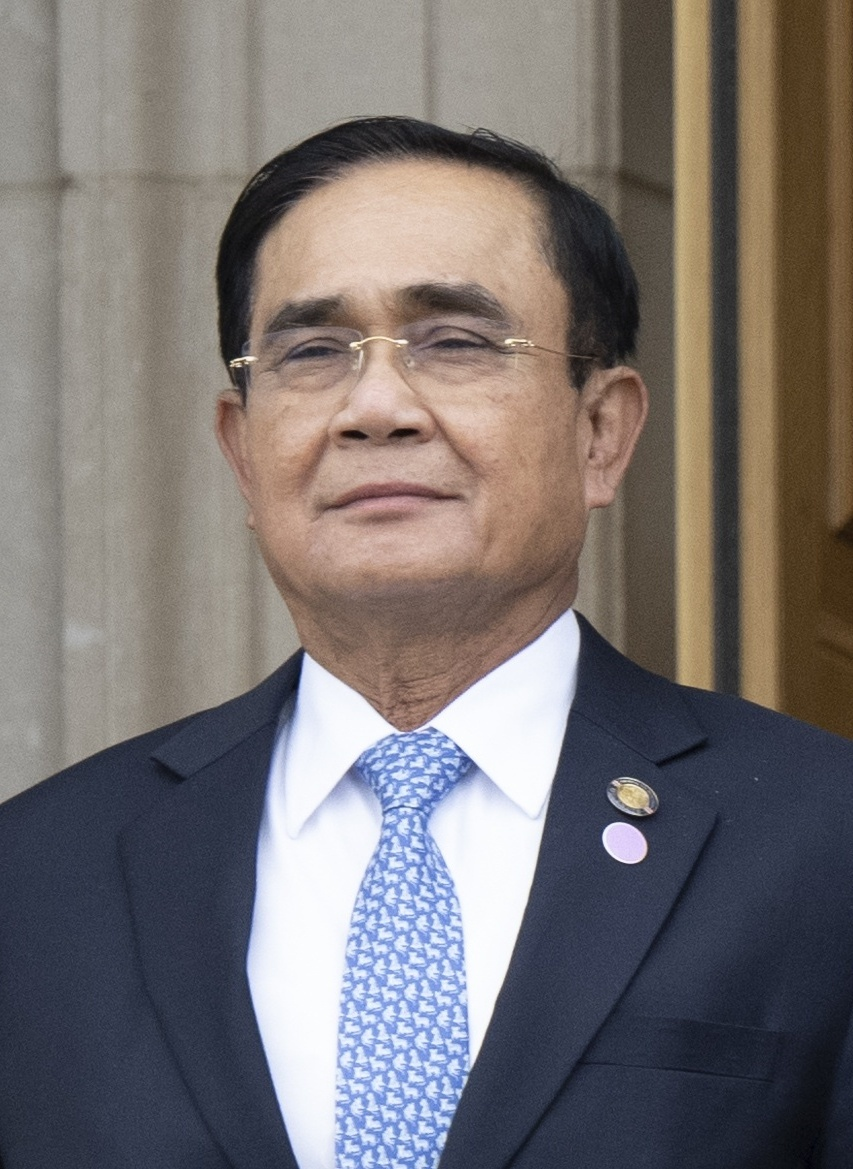
- Date formed: 10 July 2019
- Date dissolved: 1 September 2023

People and organisations
- Monarch: Vajiralongkorn
- Prime Minister: Prayut Chan-o-cha; Prawit Wongsuwon (acting)
- Prime Minister's history: 2019–2023
- Deputy Prime Ministers: First appointment (10 July 2019): Prawit Wongsuwon; Wissanu Krea-ngam; Anutin Charnvirakul; Jurin Laksanawisit; Second appointment (5 August 2020): Don Pramudwinai; Supattanapong Punmeechaow
- No. of ministers: 35
- Total no. of members: 45
- Member party: Palang Pracharath Party; Bhumjaithai Party; Democrat Party; Chart Thai Pattana Party; Action Coalition Party; Thai Local Power Party; New Economics Party; Chart Pattana Party; Thai Forest Conservation Party; Thai Nation Power Party; People Progressive Party; Pheu Chart Thai Party; Thai Teachers for People Party; Thai People Justice Party; Polamuang Thai Party; New Democracy Party; New Palangdharma Party; Tairaktham Party; ~~Thai Civilized Party~~; ~~Prachatumthai Party~~; ~~Prachaniyom Party~~; ~~People Reform Party~~
- Status in legislature: Coalition government
- Opposition party: Pheu Thai Party; Move Forward Party; Thai Liberal Party; Prachachart Party; Puea Chat Party; Thai People Power Party; Thai Civilized Party; ~~New Economics Party~~; ~~Future Forward Party~~
- Opposition leader: Sompong Amornwiwat (until 28 October 2021); Chonlanan Srikaew (since 23 December 2021)

History
- Election: 2019 general election
- Legislature term: HoR 25th: 2019–2023
- Budgets: 2020 budget; 2021 budget; 2022 budget; 2023 budget
- Predecessor: First Prayut cabinet
- Successor: Srettha cabinet

The Second Prayut cabinet, formally known as the 62nd Council of Ministers (คณะรัฐมนตรีไทย คณะที่ 62), was formed on 10 July 2019 after the 2019 general election. The coalition is led by Palang Pracharath Party which nominated Prayut Chan-o-cha, who was then serving as Prime Minister of Thailand through the National Council for Peace and Order, as its candidate for prime minister. Prayut was elected as prime minister on 5 June 2019 and received the appointment from the royal command on 9 June 2019.

The cabinet was officially sworn into office by King Vajiralongkorn on 16 July 2019.

== Election of the prime minister ==
5 June 2019; Nomination of Prayut Chan-o-cha (PPRP) and Thanathorn Juangroongruangkit (FFP) as Prime Minister; Absolute majority: 376/750
Vote	Parties	Votes
Prayut Chan-o-cha	Senators (249), Palang Pracharath Party (116), Democrat Party (51), Bhumjaithai Party (50), Chart Thai Pattana Party (10), Action Coalition of Thailand Party (5), Chart Pattana Party (3), Thai Local Power Party (2), Thai Forest Conservation Party (2), Thai Nation Power Party (1), People Progressive Party (1), Thai Civilized Party (1), Palang Thai Rak Thai Party (1), Thai Teachers for People Party (1), Prachaniyom Party (1), Prachatumthai Party (1), People Reform Party (1), Polamuang Thai Party (1), New Democracy Party (1), New Palangdharma Party (1)	500 / 750
Thanathorn Juangroongruangkit	Pheu Thai Party (136), Future Forward Party (79), Thai Liberal Party (10), Prachachart Party (7), New Economics Party (6), Puea Chat Party (5), Thai People Power Party (1)	244 / 750
Abstain	Senators (1), Democrat Party (1), Bhumjaithai Party (1)	3 / 750
Not voting	Future Forward Party (2), Democrat Party (1)	3 / 750

== Lists of Ministers ==
Party key	Action Coalition for Thailand
Party key	Bhumjaithai Party
Party key	Chart Thai Pattana Party
Party key	Chart Pattana Party
Party key	Democrat Party
Party key	Independent
Party key	Palang Pracharath Party

Portfolio	Minister (Deputy Minister)	Term		Refs.
Portfolio	Minister (Deputy Minister)	Took office	Left office	Refs.
Prime Minister	Prayut Chan-o-cha	9 June 2019	22 August 2023 (Note: Suspended: 24 August – 30 September 2022)	
Deputy Prime Ministers	Prawit Wongsuwan	10 July 2019	1 September 2023	
Deputy Prime Ministers	Somkid Jatusripitak	10 July 2019	14 July 2020	
Deputy Prime Ministers	Wissanu Krea-ngam	10 July 2019	1 September 2023	
Deputy Prime Ministers	Anutin Charnvirakul	10 July 2019	1 September 2023	
Deputy Prime Ministers	Jurin Laksanawisit	10 July 2019	1 September 2023	
Deputy Prime Ministers	Don Pramudwinai	5 August 2020	1 September 2023	
Deputy Prime Ministers	Supattanapong Punmeechaow	5 August 2020	1 September 2023	
Office of the Prime Minister	Tewan Liptapallop	10 July 2019	20 July 2020	
Office of the Prime Minister	Anucha Nakasai	5 August 2020	1 September 2023	
Office of the Prime Minister	Thanakorn Wangboonkongchana	30 November 2022	1 September 2023	
Minister of Defence	Prayut Chan-o-cha	10 July 2019	1 September 2023	
Minister of Defence	Chaicharn Changmongkol	10 July 2019	1 September 2023	
Minister of Finance	Uttama Savanayana	10 July 2019	15 July 2020	
Minister of Finance	Predee Daochai	5 August 2020	1 September 2020	
Minister of Finance	Arkhom Termpittayapaisith	1 October 2020	1 September 2023	
Minister of Finance	Santi Promphat	10 July 2019	1 September 2023	
Minister of Foreign Affairs	Don Pramudwinai	10 July 2019	1 September 2023	
Minister of Tourism and Sports	Pipat Ratchakitprakarn	10 July 2019	1 September 2023	
Minister of Social Development and Human Security	Chuti Krairiksh	10 July 2019	1 September 2023	
Minister of Higher Education, Science, Research and Innovation	Suvit Maesincee	10 July 2019	15 July 2020	
Minister of Higher Education, Science, Research and Innovation	Anek Laothamatas	5 August 2020	1 September 2023	
Minister of Agriculture and Cooperatives	Chalermchai Sri-on	10 July 2019	1 September 2023	
Minister of Agriculture and Cooperatives	Thamanat Prompow	10 July 2019	8 September 2021	
Minister of Agriculture and Cooperatives	Mananya Thaiseth	10 July 2019	1 September 2023	
Minister of Agriculture and Cooperatives	Prapat Pothasuthon	10 July 2019	1 September 2023	
Minister of Agriculture and Cooperatives	Sunthorn Pansaengthong	10 July 2019	1 September 2023	
Minister of Transport	Saksayam Chidchob	10 July 2019	3 March 2023	
Minister of Transport	Athirath Rattanaseth	3 March 2023	1 September 2023	
Minister of Transport	Thaworn Senniam	10 July 2019	24 February 2021	
Minister of Transport	Veerasak Wangsuppakitkoson	23 March 2021	1 September 2023	
Minister of Digital Economy and Society	Puttipong Punnakanta	10 July 2019	24 February 2021	
Minister of Digital Economy and Society	Chaiwut Thanakamanusorn	23 March 2021	1 September 2023	
Minister of Natural Resources and Environment	Varawut Silpa-archa	10 July 2019	1 September 2023	
Minister of Energy	Sontirat Sontijirawong	10 July 2019	15 July 2020	
Minister of Energy	Supattanapong Punmeechaow	5 August 2020	1 September 2023	
Minister of Commerce	Jurin Laksanawisit	10 July 2019	1 September 2023	
Minister of Commerce	Veerasak Wangsuppakitkoson	10 July 2019	23 March 2021	
Minister of Commerce	Sinit Lertkrai	23 March 2021	1 September 2023	
Minister of Interior	Anupong Paochinda	10 July 2019	1 September 2023	
Minister of Interior	Nipon Boonyamanee	10 July 2019	5 September 2022	
Minister of Interior	Songsak Thongsri	10 July 2019	1 September 2023	
Minister of Interior	Naris Khamnurak	30 November 2022	1 September 2023	
Minister of Justice	Somsak Thepsuthin	10 July 2019	17 March 2023	
Minister of Labour	Chatumongol Sonakul	10 July 2019	20 July 2020	
Minister of Labour	Suchart Chomklin	5 August 2020	1 September 2023	
Minister of Labour	Narumon Pinyosinwat	5 August 2020	8 September 2021	
Minister of Culture	Itthiphol Khunpluem	10 July 2019	1 September 2023	
Minister of Education	Nataphol Teepsuwan	10 July 2019	24 February 2021	
Minister of Education	Trinuch Thienthong	23 March 2021	1 September 2023	
Minister of Education	Kalaya Sophonpanich	10 July 2019	1 September 2023	
Minister of Education	Kanokwan Wilawan	10 July 2019	1 September 2023	
Minister of Public Health	Anutin Charnvirakul	10 July 2019	1 September 2023	
Minister of Public Health	Satit Pitutacha	10 July 2019	1 September 2023	
Minister of Industry	Suriya Juangroongruangkit	10 July 2019	17 March 2023	

== See also ==
- First Prayut cabinet
