= Kobsak Pootrakool =

Thai economist and politician

- กอบศักดิ์ ภูตระกูล
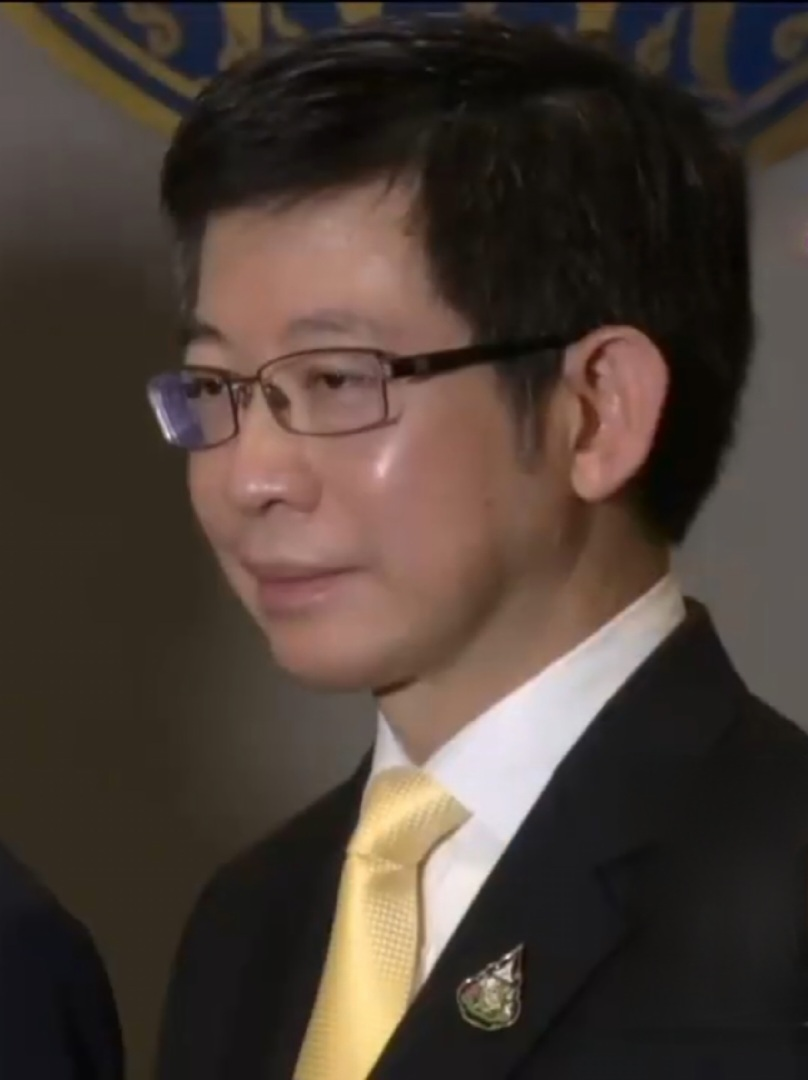

Minister of the Office of the Prime Minister
- In office 23 November 2017 – 29 January 2019 Serving with Suwaphan Tanyuvardhana
- Prime Minister: Prayut Chan-o-cha
- Preceded by: Ormsin Chivapruck; Suvit Maesincee
- Succeeded by: Tewan Liptapallop

Personal details
- Born: 23 August 1968 (age 58) Bangkok, Thailand
- Party: Palang Pracharath Party (2018–2020)
- Education: MIT; Williams College
- Profession: Economist; politician

Kobsak Pootrakool (Thai: กอบศักดิ์ ภูตระกูล, RTGS: Kopsak Phutrakun; born 23 August 1968) is a Thai economist and former politician. He served as Minister of the Office of the Prime Minister in the first cabinet of Prime Minister Prayut Chan-o-cha. Before entering politics, he worked at the Bank of Thailand and the Bangkok Bank.

== Education ==
Kobsak Pootrakool obtained a scholarship from the Bank of Thailand to study in the United States after finishing high school. He went on to earn a BA in mathematics and economics from Williams College in 1991 and a PhD in macroeconomics and international economics from the Massachusetts Institute of Technology in 1997.

== Professional career ==
After graduation, he came to work at the Bank of Thailand for 14 years, developing and implementing monetary policy and financial institution policy. He was seconded to the Stock Exchange of Thailand from 2008 to 2009 as executive director of its Research Institute for Capital Market. He resigned from the central bank in 2010 and joined Bangkok Bank to work on international banking.

== Political career ==
An interim constitution promulgated after the 2014 Thai coup d'état established a committee chaired by Borwornsak Uwanno to draft a new constitution. Kobsak was appointed to this Constitution Drafting Committee when a member resigned. The committee was dissolved in September 2015 after its draft was rejected by the National Reform Council. A new committee chaired by Meechai Ruchuphan replaced it and drew up a version that passed referendum on 7 August 2016 and came into effect on 6 April 2017.

Not long after the committee dissolution, Kobsak was appointed as vice minister for Office of Prime Minister, working under deputy prime minister Somkid Jatusripitak who was in charge of economic affairs. He was later appointed to the National Economic Reform Committee and eventually to the cabinet as Minister of the Office of the Prime Minister on 23 November 2017.

When Palang Pracharath Party was established in 2018 to prepare the ruling government for the 2019 Thai general election, Kobsak was named as party spokesman. The new party was criticized by rival parties from having four serving ministers of the cabinet in executive positions, giving it an unfair advantage in the upcoming campaign. Although Kobsak, as spokesman, asserted that the ministers will not abuse their authority, all four ministers, including Kobsak, resigned from the cabinet on 29 January 2019 to devote their time to the election.

The general election resulted in a coalition government led by Palang Pracharath party, with Prayut Chan-o-cha elected as prime minister. Kobsak was not appointed to the new cabinet but instead given the post of deputy secretary-general to the prime minister. A year later, the military faction within the party consolidated its power and pushed out the technocrat faction. Somkid Jatusripitak, deputy prime minister in charge of the economy, resigned together with his economic ministerial team, including Kobsak.
