= Timeline of the 2020 Thai protests (September 2020) =

On 5 September, approximately 300 members of the Bad Student group protested at the Ministry of Education for their three demands, i.e., an end to government harassment, reform of outdated regulations, and reform of the entire education system, delivering an ultimatum that the Education Minister should otherwise resign. A few days later, a debate was held between the Bad Student group and Education Minister Nataphol Teepsuwan, where a student representative raised the issues of restriction of freedom of political expression, arbitrary and physical punishments, and failure to protect students from sexual predators. The minister agreed to some of the issues but rejected some points, such as abandoning uniforms.

On 13 September, the House Committee on Political Development, Mass Communications and Public Participation responded to protesters' demands by agreeing to organize a dialogue forum set for 22 September, following the planned 19 September protest at Thammasat University, to discuss their proposals, including monarchy reform, the first time in the contemporary era that this matter has been raised in a Thai parliament.

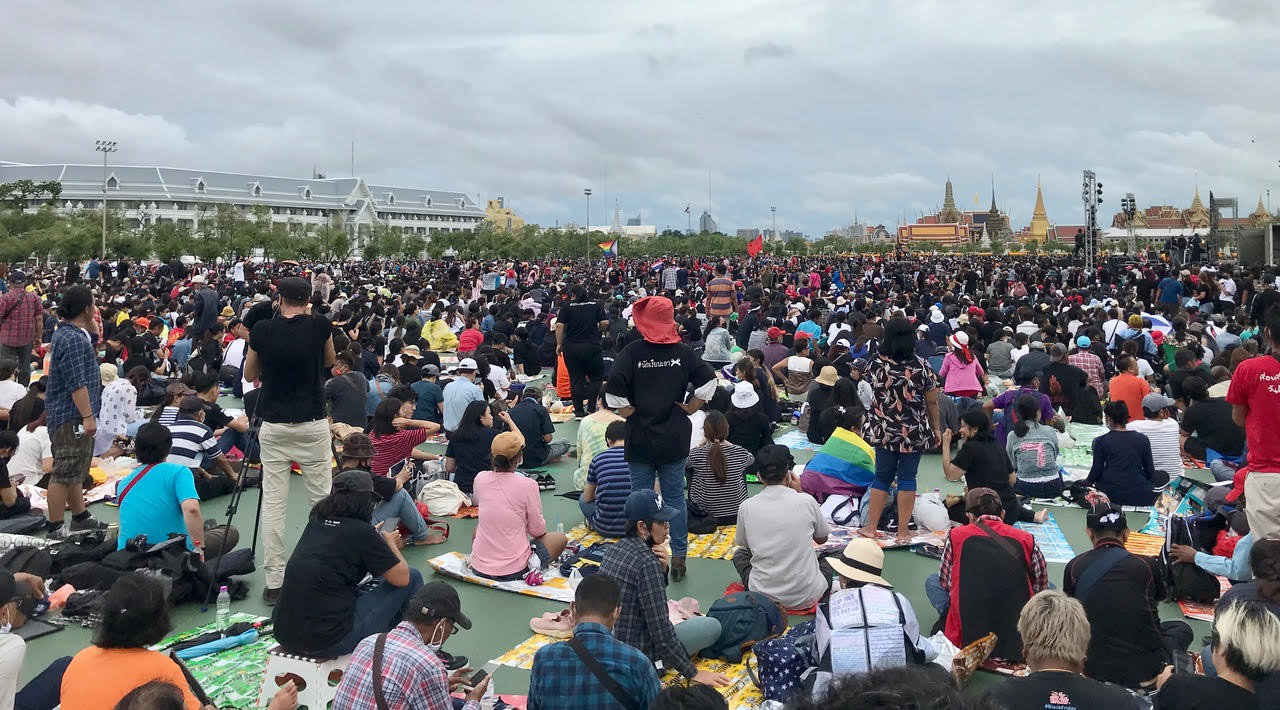
The occupation of Sanam Luang by demonstrators on 19 September 2020.

In a rally described as one of the largest protests in years, on 19 September, protesters gathered at Thammasat University after university gates were opened following a stand-off. Protesters occupied Sanam Luang in the afternoon and stayed overnight, with attendance estimated at anywhere between 5,000 and 10,000 while the police mobilized more than 10,000 officers. On 20 September, the protesters installed a plaque symbolizing democracy at Sanam Luang, intended as a successor to the original memorial plaque installed at the Royal Plaza during the 1932 Siamese Revolution, which had disappeared in 2017. The protesters shifted from their originally declared objective of moving to Government House, which was heavily barricaded, and instead submitted their demands to the President of the Privy Council via the chief of the Metropolitan Police Bureau before dispersing, and its leader declared victory. There were no reports of violence; protest leader Parit Chiwarak called for a general strike on 14 October to commemorate the 1973 Thai popular uprising. The plaque was removed less than 24 hours after it was installed; however, it has since proliferated as an online meme. Some international media described the rally as an open challenge to Vajiralongkorn's rule, and complaints have been filed against the protest leaders, including an accusation of lèse majesté.

On 23 September, pro-government group Thai Phakdee submitted to the Senate an unverified list of 130,000 names of people who it said opposed charter reform. On 24 September, Parliament voted to set up a study committee, effectively delaying a scheduled vote on constitutional amendment by at least a month. Discontent prompted #RepublicofThailand to trend first in the country's Twitter, with more than 700,000 retweets, the first mass public expression of republican sentiment in the country.

On 29 September, Prayut ordered state agencies to provide evidence to a treason case filed regarding the 10 August rally, which included demands for reform of the monarchy. It is reported that Nathaporn Toprayoon, the petitioner, hoped that a court decision would end further discussion of such reform in the protests and pave the way for prosecuting supporters of the movement.
