= Santi Promphat =

Thai politician (born 1952)

- สันติ พร้อมพัฒน์
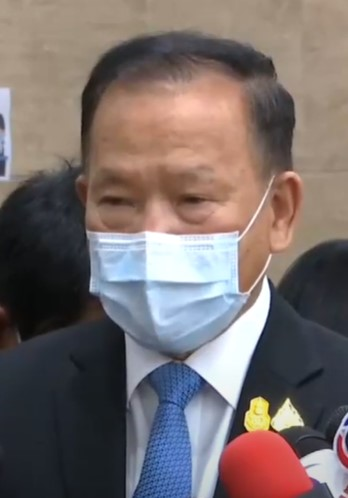

Deputy Minister of Public Health
- In office 1 September 2023 – 3 September 2024
- Prime Minister: Srettha Thavisin
- Minister: Chonlanan Srikaew; Somsak Thepsuthin

Deputy Minister of Finance
- In office 16 July 2019 – 1 September 2023
- Prime Minister: Prayut Chan-o-cha
- Minister: Uttama Savanayana; Predee Daochai; Arkhom Termpittayapaisith

Minister to the Office of the Prime Minister
- In office 30 June 2013 – 7 May 2014
- Prime Minister: Yingluck Shinawatra
- Preceded by: Sansanee Nakpong; Niwatthamrong Boonsongpaisan
- Succeeded by: Panadda Diskul; Suwaphan Tanyuvardhana

Minister of Social Development and Human Security
- In office 9 August 2011 – 30 June 2013
- Prime Minister: Yingluck Shinawatra
- Preceded by: Issara Somchai
- Succeeded by: Paveena Hongsakul

Minister of Transport
- In office 6 February 2008 – 2 December 2008
- Prime Minister: Samak Sundaravej; Somchai Wongsawat
- Preceded by: Theera Haochareon
- Succeeded by: Sophon Saram

Personal details
- Born: 1 January 1952 (age 74) Bangkok, Thailand
- Party: Palang Pracharath (since 2018)
- Other political affiliations: Pheu Thai (until 2014)
- Spouse: Wanpen Promphat
- Education: Ramkhamhaeng University
- Profession: Politician

Santi Promphat (Thai: สันติ พร้อมพัฒน์, RTGS: Santi Phromphat; born January 1, 1952) is a Thai politician who served as Deputy Minister of Finance in Prime Minister Prayut Chan-o-cha's government.

== Education ==
Santi graduated with a Bachelor of Arts (Political Science) from Ramkhamhaeng University in 2002 and a Master of Arts (Political Science) from Ramkhamhaeng University in 2004 and passed the Senior Executive Judicial Training Program (Class 11) in 2006–2007.

== Political career ==
In 2012 he served as Minister of Social Development and Human Security in Yingluck Shinawatra cabinet, in the same year he attended the Coordinated Mekong Ministerial Initiative Against Trafficking meeting in Hanoi, Vietnam. On March 15, 2012, he was accused of slander by permanent secretary of Human Development, Panita Kambhu na Ayutthaya. In 2013 he addressed greetings with Visakha Puja Day. On January 17, 2014, he inspected human rights abuses at fishing industries after discovering that his country was placed on a black list by the Tier 2 Watch company for three years straight. On March 1, 2013, he, Minister of Labor Phadermchai Sasomsub, and Police General Adul Saengsingkaew have participated in a discussion on combating human trafficking which was hosted by Surapong Tovichakchaikul. From May 15 to 16, 2013 he participated at a meeting which was hosted by the Royal Thai Government in cooperation with Asia-Pacific Development Center on Disability and World Bank to promote rights for disabled individuals in Thailand.

In 2018, Santi moved to Palang Pracharath Party to form a government with Prime Minister Prayut Chan-o-cha.
