= Rajata Rajatanavin =

Thai physician

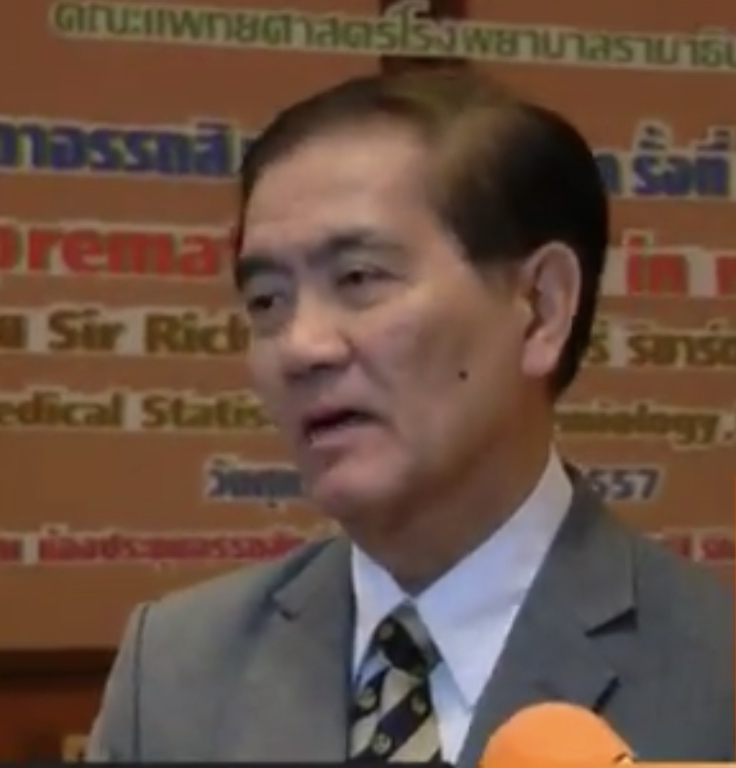
Rajata in 2014

Rajata Rajatanavin (Thai: รัชตะ รัชตะนาวิน; RTGS: Ratchata Ratchatanawin, born 13 August 1950) is a Thai physician and professor. He was President of Mahidol University, and served as Minister of Public Health in the first cabinet of Prime Minister Prayut Chan-o-cha.
