= Supattanapong Punmeechaow =

Thai politician

- สุพัฒนพงษ์ พันธ์มีเชาว์
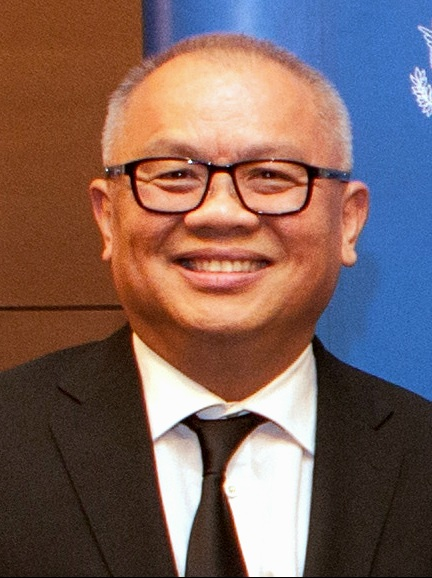

Deputy Prime Minister of Thailand
- In office 5 August 2020 – 1 September 2023
- Prime Minister: Prayut Chan-o-cha

Minister of Energy
- In office 5 August 2020 – 1 September 2023
- Prime Minister: Prayut Chan-o-cha
- Preceded by: Sontirat Sontijirawong
- Succeeded by: Pirapan Salirathavibhaga

Personal details
- Born: 12 January 1960 (age 66) Bangkok, Thailand
- Party: United Thai Nation (until 2024)
- Spouse: Nipa Punmeechaow
- Education: Chulalongkorn University
- Profession: Businessman; professor; politician

Supattanapong Punmeechaow (Thai: สุพัฒนพงษ์ พันธ์มีเชาว์, RTGS: Suphatthanaphong Phanmichao) is a Thai business executive and government minister. As of 5 August 2020, he serves as Deputy Prime Minister of Thailand and Minister of Energy in the second cabinet of Prime Minister Prayut Chan-o-cha.

== Early life and education ==
Supattanapong graduated from the Department of Chemical Engineering, Faculty of Engineering and Master's Degree from the Department of Business Administration, Faculty of Commerce and Accountancy Chulalongkorn University. He received many certificates for various courses such as from the Capital Market Academy Program, Advance Management Program from INSEAD, France.

== Careers ==
He was former president and CEO of PTT Global Chemical from October 2014 to September 2019, former executive vice president and chairman of Risk Management Committee of PTT Public Company Limited, former chairman of the board of Global Power Synergy and former chairman of the board of Global Green Chemicals Public Company Limited. On 24 July 2020, Supattanapong resigned from the position of PTT Global Chemical Company Limited, as well as resigned from the position of director and member of Corporate Risk Committee, PTT Public Company Limited, which he held the position since 25 September 2014.

== Political careers ==
It is expected that he is preparing to take over as minister of energy. On August 6 in the same year, The king by the advice of Prime Minister Prayut Chan-o-cha appointed him as Deputy Prime Minister merged with the position of Minister of Energy.

Political offices
Preceded by Sontirat Sontijirawong	Minister of Energy; 2020–present	Incumbent
