= Atchaka Sibunruang =

Thai politician

- อรรชกา สีบุญเรือง
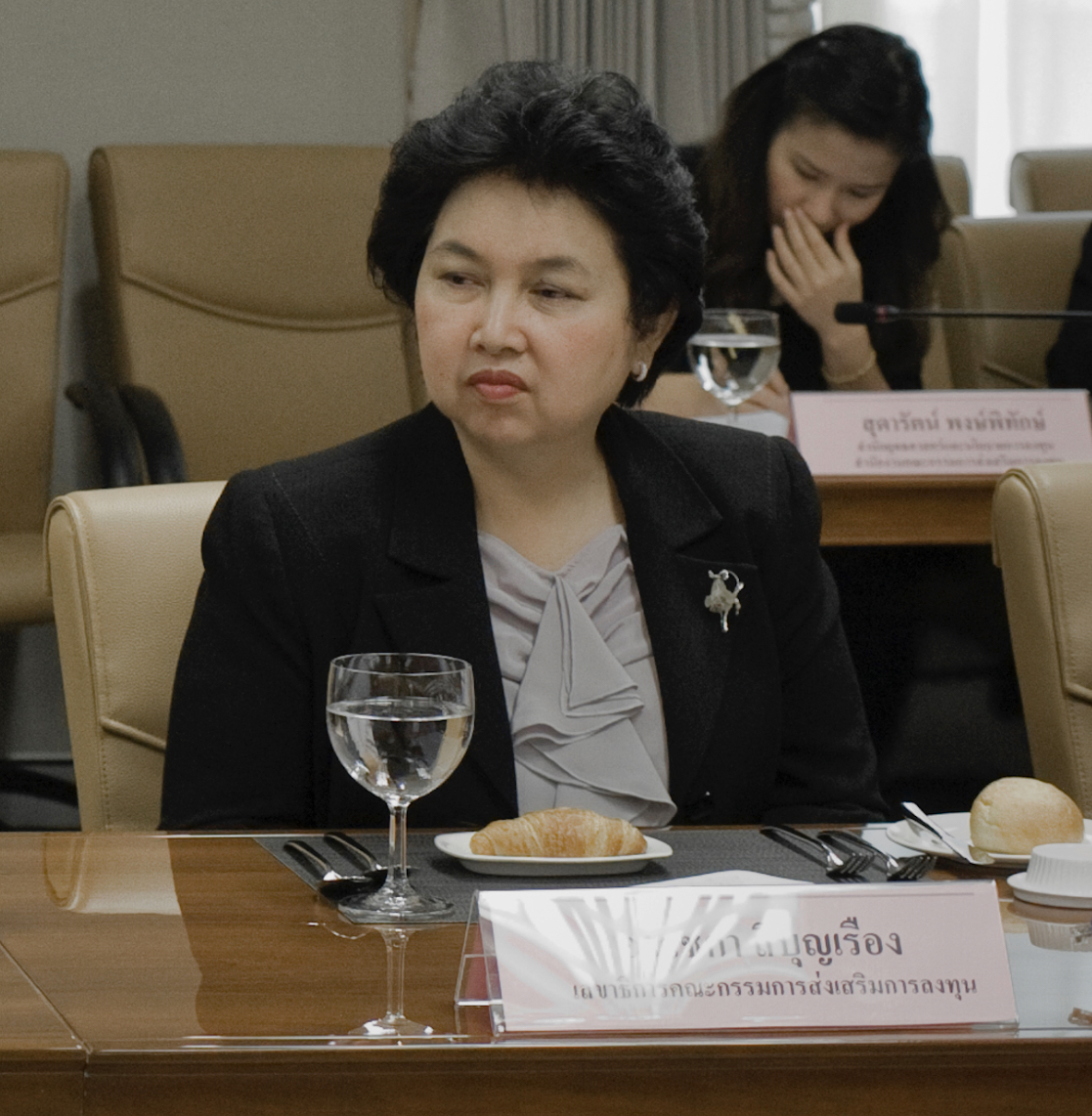
- Atchaka Sibunruang in 2011

Minister of Science and Technology
- In office 15 December 2016 – 23 November 2017
- Prime Minister: Prayut Chan-o-cha
- Preceded by: Pichet Durongkaveroj
- Succeeded by: Suvit Maesincee

Minister of Industry
- In office 19 August 2015 – 15 December 2016
- Prime Minister: Prayut Chan-o-cha
- Preceded by: Chakamon Phasukwanit
- Succeeded by: Uttama Savanayana

Personal details
- Born: 14 July 1955 (age 71) Bangkok, Thailand
- Education: Chulalongkorn University; University of Sussex
- Profession: Politician; government official

Atchaka Sibunruang (Thai: อรรชกา สีบุญเรือง, RTGS: Atchaka Sibunrueang; born 14 July 1955) is a Thai civil servant and chairman of the National Food Institute of Thailand, working mainly in industrial economy management. She served as Minister of Industry and Minister of Science and Technology in the first cabinet of Prime Minister Prayut Chan-o-cha.

== Education ==
She has a Bachelor of Economics from Chulalongkorn University. She also has a master's degree and D. Phil degree in economics from University of Sussex, United Kingdom.

== Careers ==
Atchaka Sibunruang began her career as a lecturer at the Faculty of Economics, Chulalongkorn University in 1977 to 1978, then went to study at the masters and doctorate level in England. She returned to work under the Office of the Board of Investment in 1984 until she was appointed as an investment advisor in 2004.

In 2005, Atchaka was appointed director of the Office of Industrial Economics, Ministry of Industry and Secretary-General of the Board of Investment in 2008, Deputy Permanent Secretary of the Ministry of Industry in 2012 and Director-General of the Department of Industrial Promotion the following year, was appointed as the Permanent Secretary of the Ministry of Industry in 2012 it was the first woman ever to receive the title.

Atchaka is appointed Minister of Industry in the government of Prayut Chan-o-cha on 19 August 2015 at the same time, therefore, she resigned from the position of Permanent Secretary of the Ministry of Industry. In December 2016, she was appointed as the Minister of Science and Technology.

Atchaka is also a guest lecturer in the Faculty of Commerce and Accountancy and the Faculty of Political Science at Thammasat University as well.

== Royal decorations ==
- 2008 - Knight Grand Cordon (Special Class) of The Most Noble Order of the Crown of Thailand
- 2013 - Knight Grand Cordon (Special Class) of the Most Exalted Order of the White Elephant
