= Uttaradit School =

Coordinates: 17°38′00″N 100°05′49″E

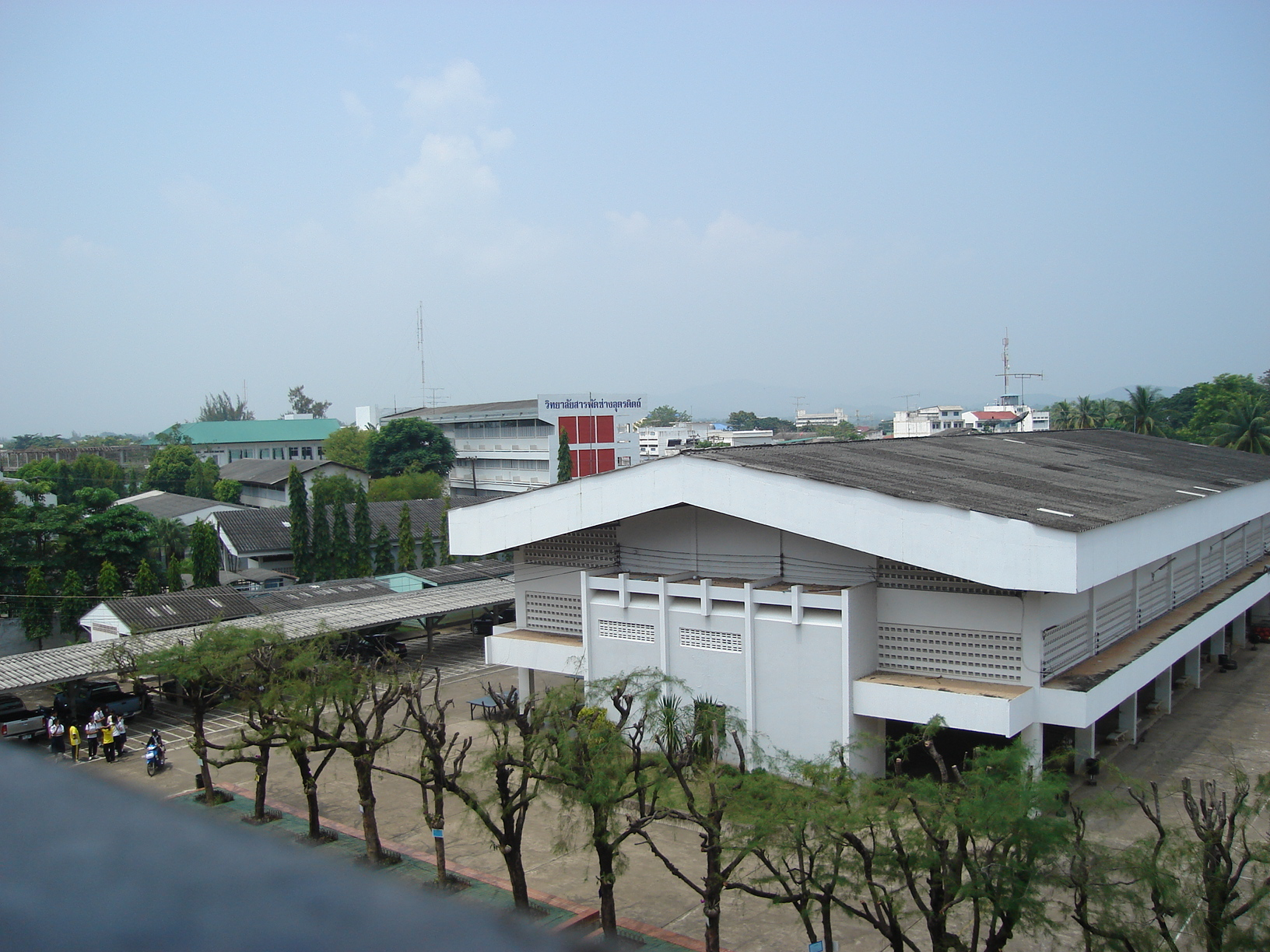

Location
- 15 Injaimee Road, Tha-It, Mueang, Uttaradit 53000; Uttaradit; Thailand

Information
- Type: Public
- Motto: Pali: สุวิชาโน ภวํ โหติ (ผู้รู้ดี คือผู้เจริญ) "Those who know well, are those who prosper." — (Proverb)
- Established: 1909; 117 years ago
- Authority: Office of the Basic Education Commission, Ministry of Education
- School code: 53012001
- Director: Dr. Weerapun Donthuam
- Enrollment: 2,673
- Classes offered: Grade 7-Grade 12
- Colours: Blue; Pink
- Song: March Uttaradit School (Thai: มาร์ชโรงเรียนอุตรดิตถ์)
- Mascot: Mondop Phra Thaen Sila At
- Website: http://www.utd.ac.th

Uttaradit School (Thai: โรงเรียนอุตรดิตถ์, Rong Rian Uttaradit) is a high school in Uttaradit, Thailand. It was established in 1909 as a provincial school (Thai: โรงเรียนประจำจังหวัดอุตรดิตถ์, Rong Rian Prajam Changwat Uttaradit) in Uttaradit
Uttaradit School It is an educational institution that used to receive the Royal School award in the category of a large secondary school. Currently, the school is divided into lower secondary and upper secondary levels. open for coeducational education

== History ==
In the reign of King Chulalongkorn, he saw the importance of education for Thai children and promoted education for Thai people thoroughly. Give people the opportunity to have the opportunity to study in the local area. Therefore, a ministry in charge of education, religion and nursing was established, namely the Ministry of Justice. In 1907, schools were established throughout Siam. Uttaradit Province established a school in Uttaradit Province. and saw the importance of schools in various temples, having the potential to teach books, so Wat Wang Tao Mo or Wat Tha Thanon at present is one of the temples that the authorities deem appropriate to be established as a school and named Wat Tha Thanon Wittayakhom School Since 1909

Later, in the year 1928, moved to the current location of Uttaradit Kindergarten. Later in the year 1941, moved to the current location (No. 15 Prachanimit Road, Tha It Subdistrict, Mueang District, Uttaradit Province. ) Originally opened to teach junior high school in the year 1952, changed the name from Uttaradit Provincial School is Uttaradit School.

Academic year 1985 opened 1 branch school (currently cancelled) and set up a new secondary school named Nam Rid Wittaya School)

== Type of Classes ==
Currently, Uttaradit School is open for teaching in grades 7-12 in the academic year 2022, with a plan to organize 12-13 classrooms per grade, a total of 74 classrooms, with details as follows.

Lower secondary level

Classrooms at the lower secondary level are divided into 6 types:

1. Special classroom type Science, Mathematics, Technology and Environment, 1 room
2. Special classroom type: Science and Mathematics,1 room
3. Special classroom type: Intensive English Program, 1 room
4. Special classroom type: Art, Music, Thai dancing, 1 room
5. Normal classroom type: science, mathematics, 4 rooms
6. Normal classroom type: Additional subjects/Art-General, 4 rooms

Higher secondary level

Classrooms at the high school level are divided into 8 types:

1. Special classroom type Science, Mathematics, Technology and Environment, 2 rooms
2. Special classroom type: Intensive English Program, 1 room
3. Normal classroom type: science, mathematics, 4 rooms
4. Special classroom type: focusing on engineering, 1 room
5. Special classroom type: ICT Talent, 1 room
6. Normal classroom type: Mathematics and English, amount 1 room
7. Normal classroom type: Chinese, Japanese and English, 1 room
8. Normal classroom type: Leadership, 1 room
9. Special classroom type: Art, Music, Thai dancing, 1 room

== Facts ==
- School Abbreviation : U.T.

== School colours ==
- Blue is everyone has a moral.
- Pink is Blood of unity affection.

== See also ==
- Official Website (in Thai)
- Official Page (in Thai)
