= Predee Daochai =

Thai financial executive

- ปรีดี ดาวฉาย
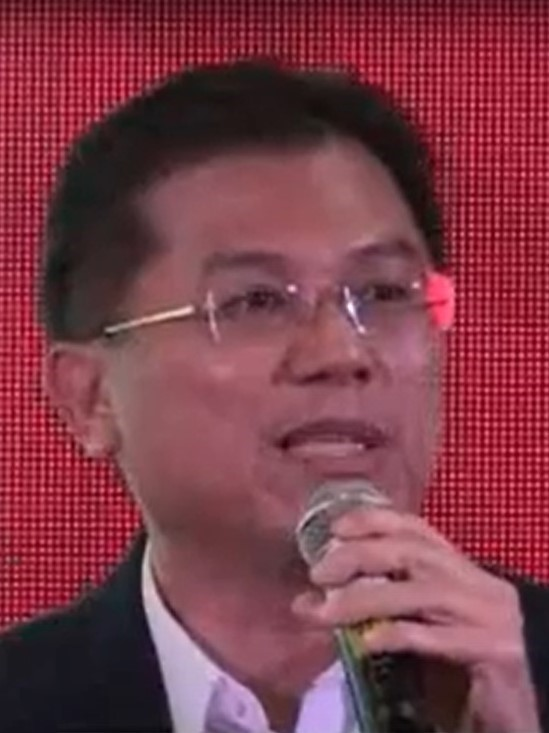

Minister of Finance
- In office 5 August 2020 – 1 September 2020
- Prime Minister: Prayut Chan-o-cha
- Preceded by: Uttama Savanayana
- Succeeded by: Arkhom Termpittayapaisith

Personal details
- Born: 9 September 1958 (age 67) Bangkok, Thailand
- Education: Thammasat University; University of Illinois at Urbana–Champaign
- Profession: Lawyer; banker

Predee Daochai (RTGS: Pridi Daochai; born 9 September 1958) is a Thai financial lawyer and executive. He served as Minister of Finance in the second cabinet of Prime Minister Prayut Chan-o-cha.

== Early life and education ==
Predee graduated with a bachelor's degree in Laws (2nd Class Honors) from Thammasat University, Barrister-at-law of the Thai Bar Association, and Master of Comparative Law from University of Illinois at Urbana–Champaign.

== Careers ==
Predee has been appointed a member of the government of Prayut Chan-o-cha in several sets such as members of the Special Economic Development Zone Policy Committee Chairman, The Thai Bankers' Association, the Board of Investment. He was a member of the National Legislative Assembly in 2014.

In September 2020, he resigned as Finance Minister after a reported conflict with his deputy, Santi Promphat, although health reasons were also cited for his resignation.

== Royal decorations ==
- Knight Grand Cordon (First Class) of the Most Exalted Order of the White Elephant
- Knight Grand Cordon (2nd Class) of The Most Noble Order of the Crown of Thailand

Political offices
Preceded by Uttama Savanayana	Minister of Finance; 2020–2020	Succeeded by Arkhom Termpittayapaisith
