= List of ministers of justice (Thailand) =

Minister of Justice
- รัฐมนตรีว่าการกระทรวงยุติธรรม
- Seal of the Ministry of Justice

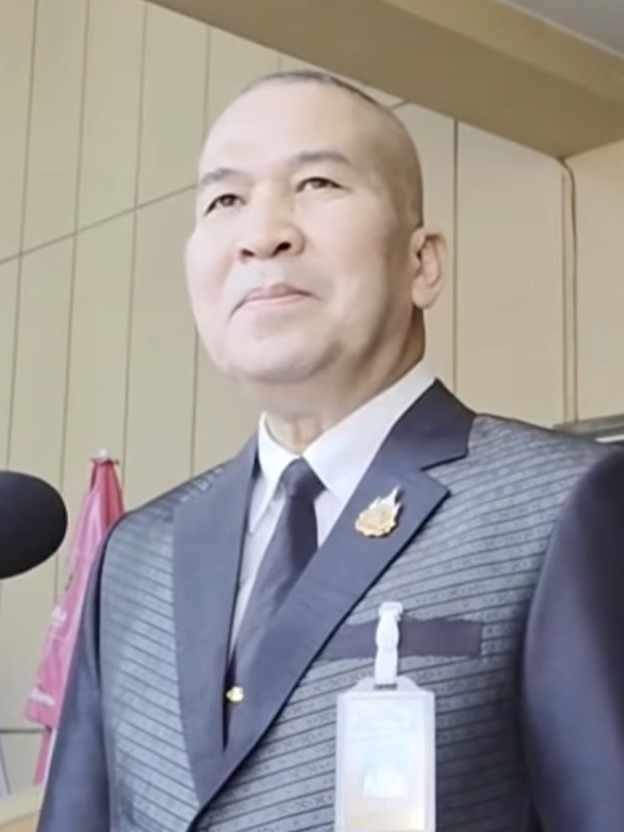
- Incumbent; Rutthaphon Naowarat since 19 September 2025
- Ministry of Justice
- Style: Mr. Minister (informal); The Honourable (formal); His Excellency (diplomatic)
- Member of: Cabinet of Thailand; National Security Council
- Seat: Ministry of Justice headquarters
- Nominator: Prime Minister of Thailand
- Appointer: King of Thailand (by royal command)
- Term length: until the expiration of the term or the dissolution of the prime minister
- Formation: 1891; 135 years ago
- Deputy: Deputy Minister of Justice
- Salary: ฿115,740 per month ($3,464 USD)
- Website: www.moj.go.th

This is a list of ministers of justice of Thailand.

== List of ministers of justice ==
=== Siam (1891–1932) ===
Order (period)	List of people	Start the agenda	End of agenda
1	Prince Svasti Sobhana, the Prince Svastivatana Visishtha	1891	1894
2	Gagananga Yukala, the Prince Bijitprijakara	1894	1896
3	Prince Raphi Phatthanasak, Prince of Ratchaburi	1896	1910
4	Prince Charunsakdi Kridakorn	1910	1912
5	Chao Phraya Abhairaja Maha Yuttithammathorn (Lop Suthat)	1912	1926
6 (1)	Chao Phraya Sridharmadhibes	1928	1932

=== Thailand (1932–present) ===
The functions of the Ministry of Justice lapsed during the following periods:

- A coup by Field Marshall Phin Choonhavan during November 8–24, 1947.
- A coup led by Field Marshall Sarit Thanarat during September 16–21, 1957.
- A coup led by Field Marshall Sarit Thanarat during October 20, 1958 – February 9, 1959.
- A Self-coup led by Field Marshall Thanom Kittikachorn during November 17, 1971 – December 17, 1972.
- The coup led by Admiral Sangad Chaloryu during October 6–8, 1976. and October 20, 1977 – November 11, 1977.
- National Peace Keeping Council oversaw operations during February 24, 1991 – March 1, 1991.
- The Council for National Security oversaw operations during September 19, 2006 – October 1, 2006.
- The National Council for Peace and Order oversaw operations during May 22, 2014 – August 30, 2014.

Number	Incumbent	Cabinet	Start date	End date
1 (1,2)	Phraya Thepwituraphahusarutabordi (Bunchuy Wanikkul)	2	10 December 1932	1 April 1933
1 (1,2)	Phraya Thepwituraphahusarutabordi (Bunchuy Wanikkul)	3	1 April 1933	20 June 1933
2 (1–3)	Phraya Nitisardpisan (Wan Jamornmarn)	4	21 June 1933	1 September 1933
2 (1–3)	Phraya Nitisardpisan (Wan Jamornmarn)	4	1 September 1933	16 December 1933
2 (1–3)	Phraya Nitisardpisan (Wan Jamornmarn)	5	16 December 1933	22 September 1934
2 (1–3)	Phraya Nitisardpisan (Wan Jamornmarn)	6	22 September 1934	9 August 1937
3	Chaophraya Mahithorn (La-or Krairurk)	7	9 August 1937	21 December 1937
4 (2)	Chao Phraya Sridharmadhibes	8	21 December 1937	16 December 1938
5 (1,2)	Thawan Thamrongnawasawat	9	16 December 1938	7 March 1942
5 (1,2)	Thawan Thamrongnawasawat	10	7 March 1942	1 August 1944
4 (3)	Chao Phraya Sridharmadhibes	11	1 August 1944	31 August 1945
6	Direk Jayanama	12	31 August 1945	September 1945
7	Phraya Nonrajvasuwat (Thongdi Nonrajvasuwat)	13	17 September 1945	31 January 1946
4 (4)	Chao Phraya Sridharmadhibes	14	31 January 1946	4 March 1946
8	Luang Chamnarnnitikaset (Uthai Sangmanee)	15	24 March 1946	11 June 1946
5 (3–5)	Thawan Thamrongnawasawat	16	11 June 1946	23 August 1946
5 (3–5)	Thawan Thamrongnawasawat	17	23 August 1946	30 May 1947
5 (3–5)	Thawan Thamrongnawasawat	18	23 August 1946	8 November 1947
9	Seni Pramoj	19	24 November 1947	21 February 1948
10 (1)	Phraya Attargarinipon (Sitti Chulnanon)	20	21 February 1948	8 April 1948
11 (1,2)	Phra Manulparnwimonsard (Chom Jamornmarn)	21	8 April 1948	25 June 1949
11 (1,2)	Phra Manulparnwimonsard (Chom Jamornmarn)	22	25 June 1949	18 July 1950
12 (1)	Liang Chaiyakarn	22	18 July 1950	11 January 1951
13 (1,2)	Khemmachart Bunyarattaphan	22	11 January 1951	29 November 1951
13 (1,2)	Khemmachart Bunyarattaphan	23	29 November 1951	6 December 1951
14 (1,2)	Phra Nititharnpiset (Chub Matayomchan)	24	6 December 1951	24 March 1952
14 (1,2)	Phra Nititharnpiset (Chub Matayomchan)	25	24 March 1952	July 1896
15	Phraya Latphreethamprakal (Wong Latphree)	25	31 July 1953	21 March 1957
12 (2)	Liang Chaiyakarn	26	21 March 1957	16 September 1957
10 (2,3)	Phraya Attargarinipon (Sitti Chulnanon)	27	21 September 1957	1 January 1958
10 (2,3)	Phraya Attargarinipon (Sitti Chulnanon)	28	1 January 1958	31 January 1958
16	Phra Dullayapaksuwaman (Bin Patthamathan)	28	4 February 1958	20 October 1958
10 (4.5)	Phraya Attargarinipon (Sitti Chulnanon)	29	9 February 1959	8 December 1963
10 (4.5)	Phraya Attargarinipon (Sitti Chulnanon)	30	8 December 1963	7 March 1969
17	Luang Jumrulnetisard (Jumrul Poshyananda)	31	9 March 1969	17 November 1971
18	Kamol Wanprapa	32	18 December 1972	14 October 1973
19	Prakob Hutasingh	33	14 October 1973	22 May 1974
20	Kitti Sihannan	34	27 May 1974	15 February 1975
21	Thiam Chaiyanan	35	15 February 1975	14 March 1975
22	Yai Sawichart	36	14 March 1975	8 January 1976
23	Boonteng Thongsawat	36	8 January 1976	20 April 1976
24	Prasit Kanchanawat	37	20 April 1976	25 September 1976
25 (1)	Chuan Leekpai	38	25 September 1976	6 October 1976
26	Sena Rattamalai	39	8 October 1976	20 October 1977
27	Sutham Patrakom	40	11 November 1977	12 May 1979
27	Sutham Patrakom	41	12 May 1979	11 February 1980
28	Rat Srikraiwin	41	11 February 1980	3 March 1980
25 (2)	Chuan Leekpai	42	3 March 1980	5 March 1981
29	Marut Bunnag	42	11 March 1981	19 March 1983
30	Pipob Asitirat	43	30 April 1983	5 August 1986
31	Sa-ard Piyawan	44	11 August 1986	3 August 1988
32	Jamrus Mungkalarat	45	9 August 1988	9 December 1990
33	Uthai Pimjaichon	46	14 December 1990	23 February 1991
34	Prapas Ouychai	47	6 March 1991	22 March 1992
35	Sawat Khamprakorb	48	17 April 1992	9 June 1992
36	Wichien Watanakun	49	18 June 1992	23 September 1992
37 (1)	Suwit Khunkitti	50	29 September 1992	15 September 1993
38	Sawai Pattano	50	23 September 1993	12 July 1995
39	Chalerm Yubamrung	51	18 July 1995	24 November 1996
37 (2)	Suwit Khunkitti	52	29 November 1996	8 November 1997
40	Suthat Ngernmuen	53	14 November 1997	9 November 2000
41 (1)	Phongthep Thepkanjana	54	17 February 2001	5 March 2002
42	Chaturon Chaisang	54	5 March 2002	3 October 2002
43	Purachai Piamsomboon	54	3 October 2002	8 February 2003
41 (2)	Phongthep Thepkanjana	54	8 February 2003	11 March 2005
44	Suwat Liptapanlop	55	11 March 2005	2 August 2005
45	Chitchai Wannasathit	55	2 August 2005	19 September 2006
46	Charnchai Likhitjitta	56	9 October 2006	6 February 2008
47	Sompong Amornvivat	57	6 February 2008	9 September 2008
48	Somsak Kiatsuranont	58	24 September 2008	2 December 2008
49	Pirapan Salirathavibhaga	59	20 December 2008	9 August 2011
50	Pracha Promnok	60	9 August 2011	30 June 2013
51	Chaikasem Nitisiri	60	30 June 2013	22 May 2014
52	Paiboon Koomchaya	61	30 August 2014	5 December 2016
-	Wissanu Krea-ngam (Acting)	61	6 December 2016	15 December 2016
53	Suwaphan Tanyuvardhana	61	15 December 2016	23 November 2017
54	Prajin Juntong	61	23 November 2017	8 May 2019
55	Somsak Thepsuthin	62	10 July 2019	17 March 2023
56	Tawee Sodsong	63	1 September 2023	3 September 2024
56	Tawee Sodsong	64	3 September 2024	19 September 2025
57	Rutthaphon Naowarat	65	19 September 2025	

== See also ==
- Ministry of Justice
- รัฐมนตรีว่าการกระทรวงยุติธรรมของไทย (Thai Minister of Justice)
