= Pichet Durongkaveroj =

Thai politician

- พิเชฐ ดุรงคเวโรจน์
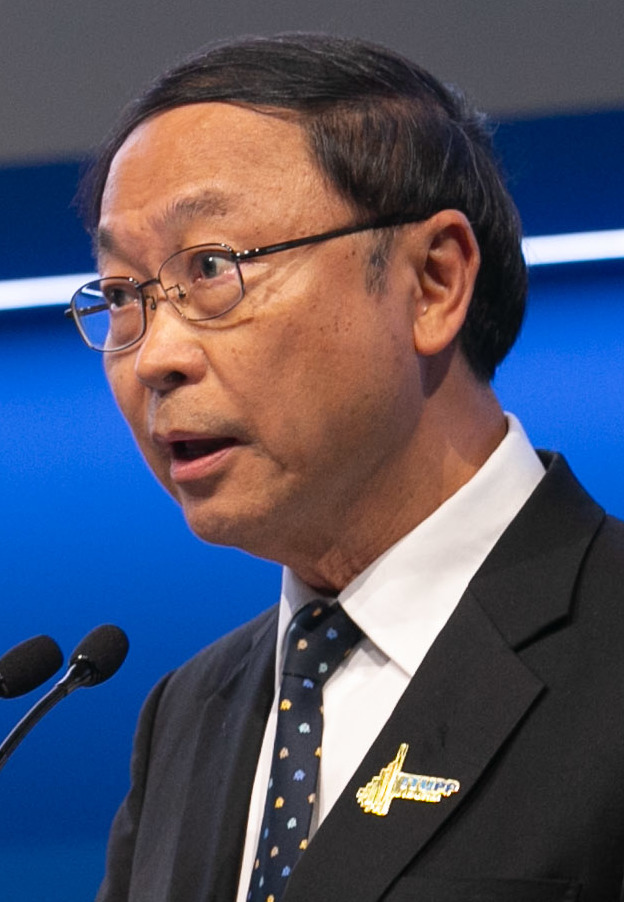
- Pichet Durongkaveroj in Dubai at ITU Plenipotentiary Conference 2018

Minister of Digital Economy and Society
- In office 15 December 2016 – 10 July 2019
- Prime Minister: Prayut Chan-o-cha
- Preceded by: Position established
- Succeeded by: Puttipong Punnakanta

Minister of Science and Technology
- In office 30 August 2014 – 15 December 2016
- Prime Minister: Prayut Chan-o-cha
- Preceded by: Peerapan Palusuk
- Succeeded by: Atchaka Sibunruang

Personal details
- Born: 7 September 1955 (age 71) Bangkok, Thailand
- Spouse: Sapa Durongkaveroj
- Education: UNSW; Trinity University; Wharton Business School
- Profession: Politician

Pichet Durongkaveroj (Thai: พิเชฐ ดุรงคเวโรจน์, RTGS: Phichet Durongkhawerot; born 7 September 1955) is a former Thai politician. He was the Minister of Science and Technology and Minister of Digital Economy and Society in the first cabinet of Prime Minister Prayut Chan-o-cha.

== Education ==
Pichet graduated from high school from Assumption College. He has a B.E. in electrical engineering from the University of New South Wales in Australia and a M.Eng.Sc. in applied solar energy from Trinity University, United States. He received his Ph.D. in public policy and management from the Wharton School of the University of Pennsylvania, United States.

== Careers ==
Pichet was a lecturer at King Mongkut's University of Technology Thonburi and previously held the position of director of the Secretariat Office of National Information Technology Committee from 1993 to 1997. He was the director of the Electronic Commerce Development Center from 1999 to 2001 and chaired the ASEAN Working Group on Information and Communication Technology from 2001 to 2003. In 2003, he was appointed director of the Knowledge Network Institute of Thailand and, in 2009, he was appointed secretary-general of the National Science Technology and Innovation Policy Office, Ministry of Science and Technology.

In 2014, he was appointed Minister of Science and Technology in the government of Prayut Chan-o-cha. In 2016, he was appointed Minister of Digital Economy and Society.

Since July 2020, he has been an independent director of the board of directors of Bangkok Bank.

== Royal decorations ==
Pichet has received the following royal decorations in the honours system of Thailand:

- Knight Grand Cordon (Special Class) of The Most Noble Order of the Crown of Thailand
- Knight Grand Cordon (Special Class) of the Most Exalted Order of the White Elephant
- Knight Grand Cross (First Class) of Order of the White Elephant
