= Anek Laothamatas =

Thai politician and academic

- เอนก เหล่าธรรมทัศน์
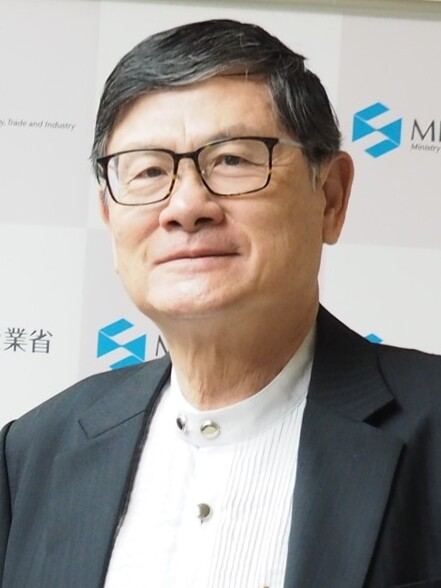
- Laothamatas in 2022

Minister of Higher Education, Science, Research and Innovation
- In office 5 August 2020 – 1 September 2023
- Prime Minister: Prayut Chan-o-cha
- Preceded by: Suvit Maesincee
- Succeeded by: Supamas Isarabhakdi

Personal details
- Born: 20 January 1954 (age 72) Lampang, Thailand
- Party: Action Coalition Party
- Spouse: Jiraporn Laothamatas
- Education: Carleton College; University of Georgia; Columbia University
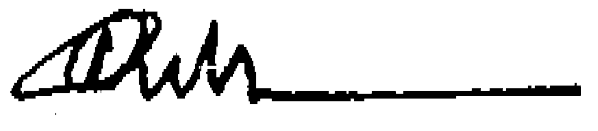
- Signature

Anek Laothamatas (Thai: เอนก เหล่าธรรมทัศน์, RTGS: Anek Laothammathat; born 20 January 1954) is a Thai political scientist and politician. He serves as Minister of Higher Education, Science, Research and Innovation in the second cabinet of Prime Minister Prayut Chan-o-cha since 5 August 2020.

== Early life and education ==
Anek graduated from middle school at Assumption College Lampang and high school at Assumption College. After that in 1972, he took the entrance examination for higher education at the Faculty of Medicine, Chulalongkorn University. He co-founded Chulalongkorn People's Party in 1976. After the 6 October 1976 massacre, he took political asylum in the forest in Phatthalung, Trang and Satun provinces for about 4 years. He moved to the United States, and studied political sciences at the College of Charleston, where he got a BA, and then got a master's from the University of Georgia. He received a PhD from Columbia University. Upon graduation, he was assigned to teach a course in Southeast Asian Political Economy before returning to be a professor at the Faculty of Political Science, Thammasat University and holds the position of Vice Rector for Academic Affairs and Dean of the Faculty of Political Science, Thammasat University. He was also invited as a visiting professor at the Paul H. Nitze School of Advanced International Studies at Johns Hopkins University in Washington, D.C.

== Political careers ==
Anek began his political life as an advisor to Marut Bunnag, the then Speaker of the House of Representatives and he participated in the founding King Prajadhipok's Institute. Later in the government of Chavalit Yongchaiyudh was an advisor to Chaturon Chaisang, Deputy Minister of Finance before becoming an advisor to Sanan Kachornprasart, Minister of the Interior in the Chuan Leekpai government.

After that, he became active in the Democrat Party until finally being the deputy leader of the party. Later, when Sanan conflict with Member of Chuan Leekpai in the party, he resigned from the Democratic Party to form the Mahachon Party and assume the position of First party leader.

In 2007, Anek joined with Pradit. Phatthaprasit established a new political party, the Thais United National Development Party, but Anek resigned from that party the following year, and in 2018, Anek was a member and executive director of the Action Coalition for Thailand.

In 2020, he was appointed Minister of Higher Education, Science, Research and Innovation in the government of Prayut Chan-o-cha in the August Cabinet reshuffle. He announced his vision that soon Thailand will be the fifth nation in Asia to be able to produce spacecraft and send it to orbit the Moon. It is expected that the process will take no more than seven years, and may involve cooperation and support from the people in raising funds.

== Writing career ==
Anek Laothamatas made his name in academic world with “Tale of Two Democracies”, which explores the divide in Thai society between the rural and urban sectors.

== Royal decorations ==
Anek has received the following royal decorations in the Honours System of Thailand:

- Knight Grand Cordon (Special Class) of The Most Noble Order of the Crown of Thailand
- Knight Grand Cordon (Special Class) of the Most Exalted Order of the White Elephant
- Companion of The Most Admirable Order of the Direkgunabhorn

Political offices
| Preceded by Suvit Maesincee | Minister of Higher Education, Science, Research and Innovation; 2020–present | Incumbent |
