= Trinuch Thienthong =

Thai politician (born 1972)

Treenuch Thienthong
- ตรีนุช เทียนทอง
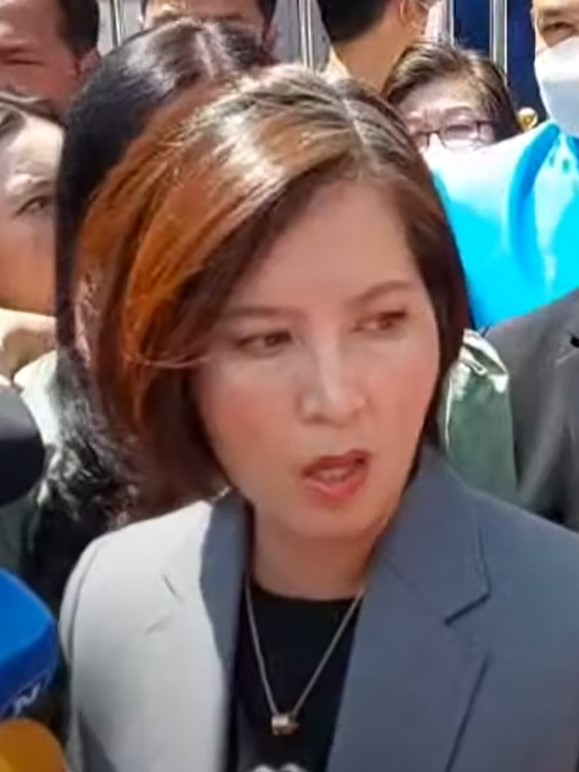

Minister of Labour
- In office 19 September 2025 – 30 March 2026
- Prime Minister: Anutin Charnvirakul
- Preceded by: Pongkawin Juangroongruangkit
- Succeeded by: Julapun Amornvivat

Minister of Education
- In office 22 March 2021 – 1 September 2023
- Prime Minister: Prayut Chan-o-cha
- Preceded by: Nataphol Teepsuwan
- Succeeded by: Permpoon Chidchob

Member of the House of Representatives
- Incumbent
- Assumed office 6 January 2001

Leader of the Palang Pracharath Party
- Incumbent
- Assumed office 7 March 2026 (Note: Acting (5 January – 7 March 2026))
- Preceded by: Prawit Wongsuwon

Personal details
- Born: 12 September 1972 (age 54) Sa Kaeo, Thailand
- Party: Palang Pracharath
- Spouse: Jesada Chokdamrongsuk
- Education: Western Illinois University
- Profession: Politician

Treenuch Thienthong (Thai: ตรีนุช เทียนทอง, RTGS: Trinut Thianthong; born 12 September 1972) is a Thai politician who is the current leader of the Palang Pracharath Party. She previously served as the Minister of Labour in the first cabinet of Prime Minister Anutin Charnvirakul (2025–2026) and as the Minister of Education in the second cabinet of Prayut Chan-o-cha (2021–2023). She was the first woman to serve as Thailand's Minister of Education.

== Early life and education ==
Treenuch was born on 12 September 1972 in Watthana Nakhon District, Sa Kaeo Province, when it was still part of Prachinburi Province. She is the niece of Sanoh Thienthong, an influential figure and behind-the-scenes powerbroker in Thai politics.

Treenuch has a Bachelor of Business in Finance and Master of Arts in economics from Western Illinois University in the United States.

== Political career ==
Treenuch was elected as a member of the House of Representatives for Sa Kaeo Province in the 2001 Thai general election under the Thai Rak Thai Party. She was subsequently elected four more times, the last time under the Pheu Thai Party. In 2018, she moved to work with the Palang Pracharath Party, and in the 2019 Thai general election, she was elected for a fifth term.

On 22 March 2021, she assumed the position of Minister of Education, making her the first female politician to be elected to this position.

== Personal life ==
Treenuch is married to Dr. Jesada Chokdamrongsuk, former Permanent-Secretary of the Ministry of Public Health.
