= Chaophraya Mahithon =

Chaophraya Mahithon (La-or Krairiksh)
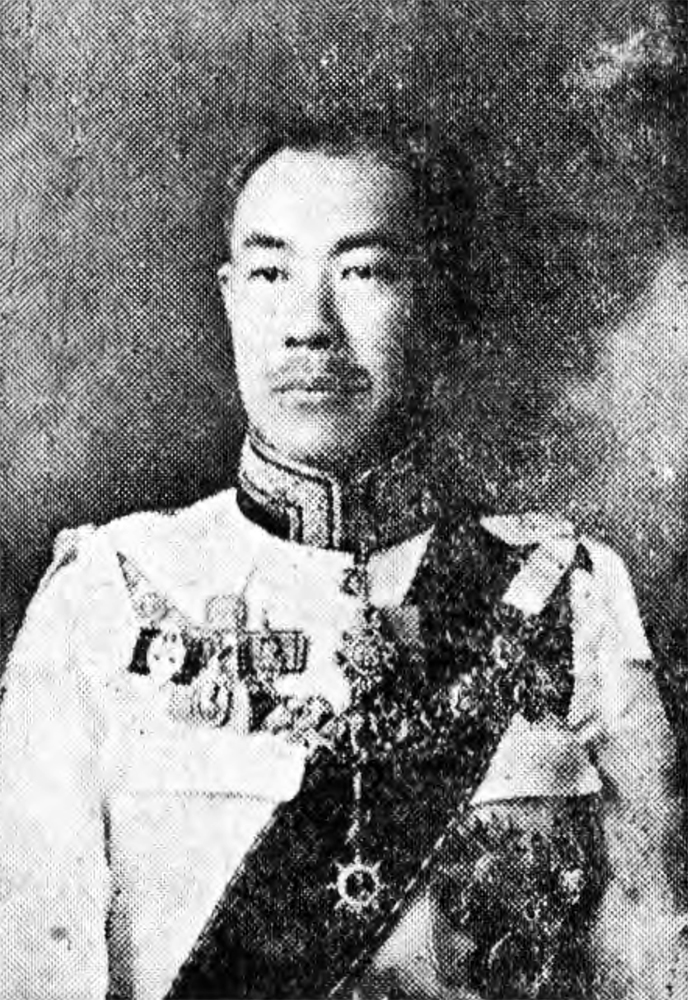

Minister of Justice
- In office 9 August 1937 – 21 December 1937 (4 months and 12 days)

Personal details
- Born: July 2, 1874
- Died: May 8, 1956 (aged 81)

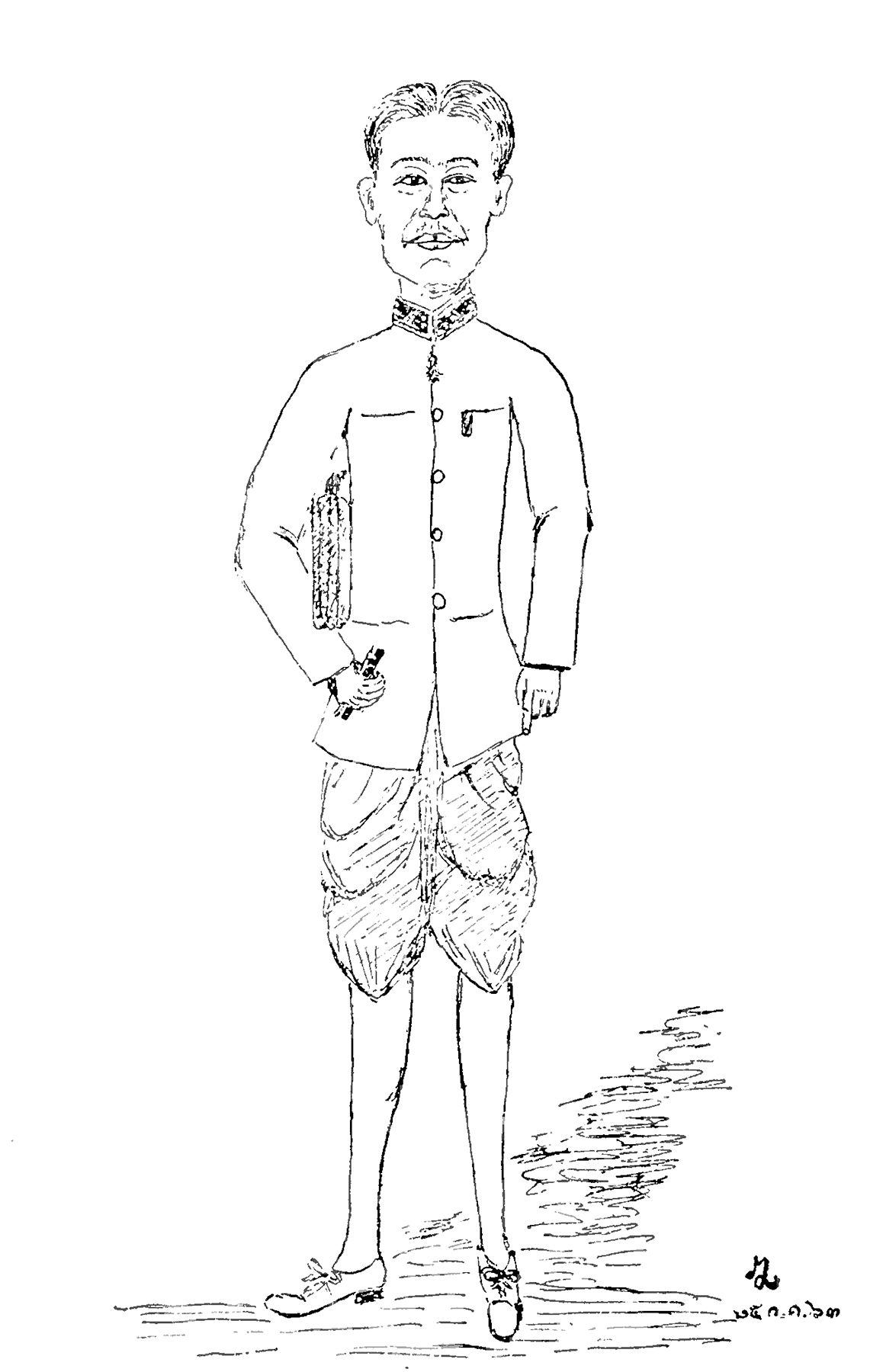
Caricature of Chaophraya Mahithon, drawn by King Vajiravudh

Chaophraya Mahithon (July 2, 1874 – May 8, 1956), personal name La-or Krairiksh, was a former Privy Councilor during the reign of King Prajadhipok, former Royal Secretary, former Minister of Justice, and former President of the Supreme Court.

== Life ==
La-or Krairiksh was born on Thursday, the 4th waning moon of the 8th lunar month, corresponding to July 2, 1874, at 8 a.m. in Khlong San district, Thonburi Province. He was the fourth child of Phraya Phetcharat (Mora) and his third wife, Tal Krairiksh. He married Kleep, the daughter of Muen Nararak (Pin Bangyikhan), who owned a garden in Bangyikhan, Thonburi. Her mother's name was Hun, born into the Sonthirat family, a high-ranking noble family during the early Rattanakosin period.

== Education ==
- 1885, studied at Wat Chakrawad Rachawat School.
- 1886, Suankularb Palace School
- 1897, passed 1st level of the Bar Examination from the Law School of the Ministry of Justice, becoming the first Barrister in Thailand.

== Civil service ==
- 1891 – assisted in the Supreme Court
- Assisting in the Department of Royal Secretariat
- Judge of the Criminal Court (currently the Court of Justice)
- Commander and Law Instructor at the Ministry of Justice's Law School
- Secretary to the Minister of Justice (His Royal Highness Prince Raphi Phatthanasak)
- 1898 – Chief Justice of the Civil Court
- 1901 – Permanent Secretary Ministry of Justice
- 1910 – Supreme Court Judge
- May 16, 1911 – Director-General of the Supreme Court
- 1911 – Royal Secretary for the Council of State
- 1914 – became the Minister of Law (the first head of the Department of Law)
- 1918 – Director-General of the Supreme Court (President of the Supreme Court) (the first commoner to hold this position)
- December 15, 1919 – Royal Secretary
- Privy Councilors
- 1937 – Minister of Justice
