= Apisak Tantivorawong =

Thai politician

- อภิศักดิ์ ตันติวรวงศ์
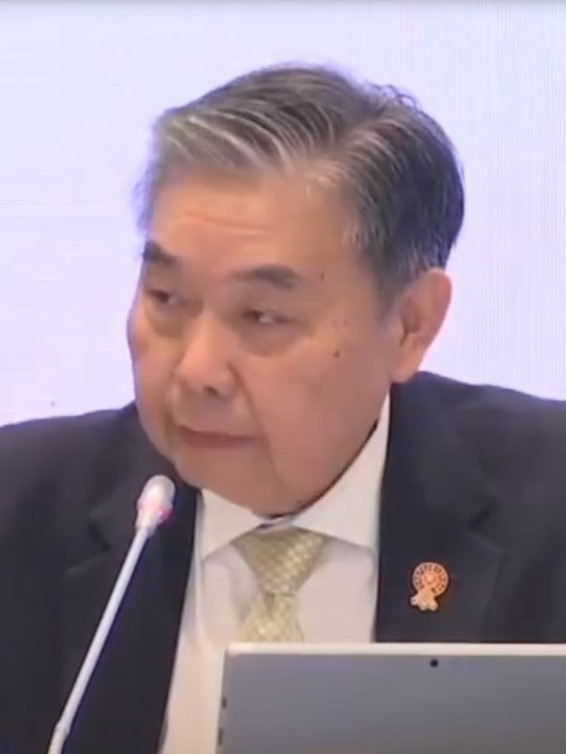

Minister of Finance
- In office 19 August 2015 – 10 July 2019
- Prime Minister: Prayut Chan-o-cha
- Preceded by: Sommai Phasee
- Succeeded by: Uttama Savanayana

Personal details
- Born: 28 August 1953 (age 72)

Apisak Tantivorawong (Thai: อภิศักดิ์ ตันติวรวงศ์, RTGS: Aphisak Tantiworawong; born 28 August 1953) is a Thai banker and financial executive. He served as Minister of Finance in the first cabinet of Prime Minister Prayut Chan-o-cha from 2015 to 2019.

Political offices
Preceded by Sommai Phasee	Minister of Finance; 2015–2019	Succeeded by Uttama Savanayana
