= Palang Pracharath Party =

Palang Pracharath Party พรรคพลังประชารัฐ
- Abbreviation: PPRP
- Leader: Trinuch Thienthong
- Secretary-General: Yuttana Sritabut
- Spokesperson: Yuttana Sritabut
- Founders: Chuan Chuchan; Suchart Jantarachotikul
- Founded: 2 March 2018; 8 years ago
- Preceded by: National Council for Peace and Order (Main)
- Headquarters: Lat Phrao, Bangkok
- Membership: 53,813
- Ideology: Militarism; National conservatism; Right-wing populism; Monarchism; Economic populism
- Political position: Right-wing
- Colours: Green; Blue; Red; Orange
- Slogan: ก้าวข้ามความขัดแย้ง ขจัดปัญหา พัฒนาทุกพื้นที่ ('Overcoming conflicts, eliminating problems, developing every area')
- Anthem: "พลังประชารัฐ" ('Palang Pracharath')
- House of Representatives: 5 / 500
- PAO Chief Executives (including party affiliates): 8 / 76

Website
- pprp.or.th

The Palang Pracharath Party (Thai: พรรคพลังประชารัฐ, RTGS: Phak Phalang Pracharat, pronounced [pʰák pʰā.lāŋ prā.tɕʰāː.rát]; lit. 'People's State Power Party') is a Thai right-wing conservative civil-military political party with ties to the National Council for Peace and Order, the military junta that ruled the country after the 2014 coup. It was established in 2018 by Chuan Chuchan (ชวน ชูจันทร์) and Suchart Jantarachotikul (สุชาติ จันทรโชติกุล) as a "party of power" to support Prayut Chan-o-cha in 2019 Thai general election.

In the 2019 Thai general election, Palang Pracharath's candidate for prime minister was incumbent prime minister and military junta leader, Prayut Chan-o-cha. Although Palang Pracharath came 2nd in the polls, it successfully nominated Prayut and formed a coalition government with votes from 249 senators, and MPs from the Democrat and Bhumjaithai parties.

Prior to the 2023 general election, several former members of Palang Pracharath split off to form the United Thai Nation Party, and were later joined by Prayut Chan-o-cha. The party split again in 2024 after the Paetongtarn cabinet reshuffled. As a result, 20 MPs from Thamanat’s faction were expelled and later joined the Kla Tham Party.

== Founding ==
Former logo of Palang Pracharath Party

Co-founder Suchart Jantarachotikul is a retired army colonel who was a classmate of Prayut Chan-o-cha at the Armed Forces Academies Preparatory School, shortly served as a member of parliament of the New Aspiration Party representing Songkhla Province in 1992 and was a member of the junta-appointed National Reform Steering Assembly from 2015 to 2017.

Palang Pracharath supported Prayut Chan-o-cha, who had ruled the country as the head of the military junta since the 2014 coup d'état, in the 2019 election. While multiple parties supported Prayut, the party was viewed as the "official pro-junta party" or "pro-Prayut party" because many party leaders are also junta cabinet members and advisors. Additionally, the party's name, Palang Pracharath, was the same as the junta's key policy initiative.

The party was supported by the Sam Mitr ("Three Friends" or "Three Allies") group of former prime minister Thaksin Shinawatra's cabinet ministers: Somsak Thepsuthin, Suriya Jungrungreangkit, and former deputy prime minister Somkid Jatusripitak. The group has tried to win over former members of parliament from the pro-Thaksin Pheu Thai Party (and its predecessors Thai Rak Thai and People's Power Party), the Red Shirts movement, as well as the Democrat Party. The Sam Mitr, by operating as a group of friends, were able to mobilize politically while at the time, parties were not allowed to.

In November 2018, the Sam Mitr group and over 150 former members of parliament formally joined Palang Pracharath. As of November, at least 44 were former Pheu Thai, People's Power Party (Palang Prachachon), and Thai Rak Thai Party MPs. Additionally, at least 14 came over from the Democrat Party.

== 2019 elections ==
Since its founding, the party has been widely criticized for its leaders' close relationship to the junta and alleged abuse of their cabinet positions to fund-raise and campaign for Palang Pracharath. While Prayut had strong ties to Palang Pracharath, campaigned in a quasi-political fashion to promote himself in 2017-2018 prior to election campaigning being legally permitted, and was seen as its real leader, he was not an official member of the party. In late January, 2019, after the publication of the royal decree formalizing the election, four Prayut cabinet ministers resigned from their positions to campaign full-time. As, under the new constitution, parties are allowed to name non-members as their prime minister candidates, the following day, the party announced their three candidates for prime minister would be Prayut Chan-o-cha, Uttama Savanayana, and former deputy prime minister, Somkid Jatusripitak. On February 8, 2019, the party announced that their only PM candidate would be Prayut. Uttama, party leader, remarked that with Prayut as the PM candidate, Palang Pracharath would become "invincible."

Prayut was nominated and was duly elected Prime Minister of Thailand by members of the lower house and every member of the junta-appointed Senate save one, returning him to the position he had held as junta leader.

== Policies ==
The party adopted the state policies of the 'Pracharat' (literally “people’s state”) scheme, developed by the 2014–2019 military regime. The term is derived from a term in the Thai national anthem and was previously employed in the Eighth National Economic and Social Development Plan (1997–2001). The terms implies a state-people partnership, and the state program introduced populist policies specifically designed to counter the populist policies of the Pheu Thai Party, such as support for cheap housing, debt relief for both laborers and farmers, improving the minimum wage, and payments for newborns and mothers. This blurring of state-political policies meant that during the electoral campaign, the party enjoyed the advantage of distributing a state Pracharat welfare card to poorer, rural, traditionally Pheu Thai voters, using state funding, which was criticised as a form of vote-buying. Since winning the election, the Party has continued the Pracharat 'brand' and welfare scheme, which while introducing welfare policies targeting the poor, which has been criticised as a form of replacing a political society with a 'depoliticised' welfare society supported by a hierarchical form of capitalism (e.g., monopolies).

== Notable members ==
=== Former members ===
- Sakoltee Phattiyakul, party executive and former PDRC leader
- Santi Promphat, former Yingluck Shinawatra cabinet minister
- Thamanat Prompow, party executive and former Prayut Agriculture and Cooperatives Deputy Minister
- Nataphol Teepsuwan, deputy party leader, former Democrat MP and PDRC leader.
- Puttipong Punnakanta, party executive, political adviser to the prime minister, and former PDRC leader
- Suvit Maesincee, deputy party leader and former Prayut Science and Technology Minister
- Kobsak Pootrakool, party spokesman and former Prayut Minister of the Office of the Prime Minister
- Suriya Juangroongruangkit, former Thaksin Shinawatra cabinet minister
- Somsak Thepsuthin, former Thaksin Shinawatra cabinet minister
- Uttama Savanayana, first party leader and former Prayut Industry Minister
- Sontirat Sontijirawong, secretary-general and former Prayut Commerce Minister

On 29 January 2019, all four Prayut cabinet ministers (Uttama Savanayana, Suvit Maesincee, Sontirat Sontijirawong and Kobsak Pootrakool) resigned from their government positions after months of criticism.

Prawit Wongsuwon, former Commander-in-Chief of the Royal Thai Army, and regarded as the mastermind of the 2014 military coup and of the junta regime, attended a party meeting in July 2019 and on June 22, 2020, accepted the Party's invitation to become its leader. Prawit replaced Uttama Savanayana, who lost the party leadership after the party’s executive board was dissolved, following the mass resignation of 18 board members, mainly the technocratic faction, including Suriya Juangroongruangkit and Somsak Thepsuthin. This then led to a cabinet reshuffle, in which the military faction, led by Prayut, asserted its dominance.

== Controversies and scandals ==
=== Potential conflicts of interest controversy ===
The Pheu Thai Party has complained to the Election Commission (EC), accusing the Palang Pracharat Party of enjoying undue support from government figures and agencies. Democrat Party leader, Abhisit Vejjajiva, and others have called current cabinet ministers who are also party leaders to resign, citing possible potential conflicts of interests such as abusing government resources and budget allocation to gain an unfair advantage in the upcoming election.

In response, Palang Pracharat party spokesman and Minister of the Office of the Prime Minister, Kobsak Pootrakool, assured that cabinet members will behave ethically and not abuse their authority.

In November 2018, Prayut's cabinet approved an 86.9 billion baht cash handout package. Critics responded by alleging that the cash handouts are an attempt at "using people's tax money to buy votes" in the upcoming elections. The Election Commission also responded by announcing that it is looking into whether or not to open an investigation into this matter.

Palang Pracharat leader and Industry Minister, Uttama Savanayana, denied the allegations and said that the cash handouts are intended to help the poor and the needy.

=== Gerrymandering controversy ===
Per the new constitution, the Election Commission was tasked with redrawing the country's constituency boundaries. However, as the EC was about to announce the new boundaries, Prime Minister Prayut Chan-o-cha invoked Section 44 to issue an order extending the announcement. The order also exempted the new constituency boundaries from existing laws and guidelines. Previously, each district are only allowed to be drawn three different ways to prevent partisan gerrymandering. However, under Prayut's new order, the EC would be allowed to draw boundaries in any matter they wish.

This prompted criticism from the Pheu Thai and Democrat Parties, as well as from a watchdog organization, Open Forum for Democracy Foundation. They argued the delay would enable the EC to draw maps that favor pro-junta parties, namely Palang Pracharat. Some journalists and commentators compared this to gerrymandering in the United States, while others opined that the junta had already won the election.

Election Commission chairman, Ittiporn Boonpracong, denied the allegations, citing eye surgery as the cause of the delay.

On 29 November, the EC completed and released the new district constituencies. Following the release, political parties and watchdog organizations stated that they found many instances of gerrymandering that would benefit the pro-junta Palang Pracharat Party.

=== Dinner fundraiser scandal ===
On 19 December, Palang Pracharath held a 200-table dinner fundraiser raising 600 million baht. During the event, an Isranews journalist obtained a photograph of the floor plan and confirmed its authenticity with event organizers. The map detailed the number of tables purchased by various individuals and organizations. Among the organizations on the floor plan were the Finance Ministry, Tourism Authority of Thailand, and "Bangkok," which is widely believed to be the Bangkok Metropolitan Administration. This has raised concerns that state agencies were using taxpayers' money to aid the pro-junta party. Concerns were also raised that Palang Pracharath leaders, who are also currently serving as cabinet ministers, used their government positions to solicit funds, which would be illegal.

Others pointed out that the fundraiser was organized within a week after the ban on political activity was lifted. This would not have been possible unless the organizers had insider knowledge of when the ban would be lifted because the venue would have needed to be booked at least a month in advance.

According to the map, party leaders also purchased multiple tables at the fundraiser, also raising concerns. At 3 million baht per table, this would mean that leaders contributed more than the legal maximum of 10 million baht per individual to the party. Additionally, this raised concerns regarding the source of the money.

On this issue, former EC commissioner, Somchai Srisutthiyakorn, stated that if the party leaders used their personal funds to purchase the tables, they would need to be investigated for their unusually high wealth. However, if they purchased tables for other individuals, in effect, hiding their identities in financial disclosures, they may be breaking election, bribery, and money laundering laws.

The Finance Ministry and Tourism Authority of Thailand has denied any links to the fundraiser dinner. Meanwhile, party secretary-general and commerce minister, Sontirat Sontijirawong, stated the map is inauthentic and accused Isranews of spreading false news.

After public outcry, the Election Commission confirmed that they are looking into the matter.

Due to regulations, Palang Pracharath had to publicly release records within a month of the fundraiser. In late January, the party released records accounting for 90 million baht raised at the dinner. The records revealed that most of the donations were either from recipients of government concessions (such as airport duty-free conglomerate King Power) or government contractors.

Palang Pracharath declined to answer questions on the floor plan names suspected of being government entities: Finance Ministry, Tourism Authority of Thailand, and Bangkok municipal government.

According to the party, the other 532 million baht raised were paid for after the fundraising deadline, so those records will be published in the party's donors list at a later date.

=== State welfare card scandal ===
In December, a Yasothon resident alleged that people attempting to collect their state welfare cards were given documentation and forced to join the Party. Officials told them that if they refused to join the party, they would not receive state welfare cards. However, if they did, they would also be given 100 baht to assist with transportation.

Palang Pracharath denied any links to state welfare card distribution. The Election Commission stated that they were looking into the matter.

In late January 2019, Nattawut Saikua, a Thai Raksa Chart politician raised concerns about Palang Pracharath using state welfare cards to solicit support from voters. He cited several reports of state welfare card owners receiving phone calls from individuals asking them to vote for Palang Pracharath to ensure continued support for the program. Nattawut believes that these individuals are either government workers or linked to the government in some manner because of their access to records of card holders.

== Election results ==
| Election | Total seats won | Total votes | Share of votes | Seat change | Outcome of election | Election leader |
|---|---|---|---|---|---|---|
| 2019 | 116 / 500 | 8,433,137 | 23.73% | ▲116 seats | Governing coalition | Prayut Chan-o-cha |
| 2023 | 40 / 500 | 530,017 | 11.33% | ▼81 seats | Junior partner in governing coalition (until 2024) | Prawit Wongsuwon |
| 2023 | 40 / 500 | 530,017 | 11.33% | ▼81 seats | Opposition (2024–2025) | Prawit Wongsuwon |
| 2023 | 40 / 500 | 530,017 | 11.33% | ▼81 seats | Junior partner in minority governing coalition (after 2025) | Prawit Wongsuwon |
| 2026 | 5 / 500 | 130,730 | 0.40% | ▼35 seats | Junior partner in governing coalition | Trinuch Thienthong |
