= Somsak Chunharas =

Thai medical doctor and public health official

- Born: July 28, 1953 (age 72)
- Occupations: Medical doctor and public health official
- Known for: Deputy Minister of Public Health from 2014–2015
- Medical career
- Institutions: National Health Foundation of Thailand

Somsak Chunharas (Thai: สมศักดิ์ ชุณหรัศมิ์, RTGS: Somsak Chunharat; born 28 July 1953) is a Thai medical doctor and public health official. He served as Deputy Minister of Public Health from 2014–2015, and has been a member of numerous national and international health committees and advisory boards. He also is President of the National Health Foundation of Thailand.

== Publications ==
- Swanson, RC; Atun, R; Best, A; Betigeri, A; de Campos, F; Chunharas, S; Collins, T; Currie, G; Jan, S; McCoy, D; Omaswa, F; Sanders, D; Sundararaman, T; Van Damme, W (2015). "Strengthening health systems in low-income countries by enhancing organizational capacities and improving institutions". Global Health. 11: 5. doi:10.1186/s12992-015-0090-3. PMC 4340278. PMID 25890069.
- Russell, E; Swanson, RC; Atun, R; Nishtar, S; Chunharas, S (2014). "Systems thinking for the post-2015 agenda". Lancet. 383 (9935): 2124–5. doi:10.1016/S0140-6736(14)61028-X. PMID 24953473.
- Swanson, RC; Cattaneo, A; Bradley, E; Chunharas, S; Atun, R; Abbas, KM; Katsaliaki, K; Mustafee, N; Mason Meier, B; Best, A (2012). "Rethinking health systems strengthening: key systems thinking tools and strategies for transformational change". Health Policy Plan. 27 Suppl 4 (Suppl 4): iv54-61. doi:10.1093/heapol/czs090. PMC 3529625. PMID 23014154.
- Chunharas, S (2006). "An interactive integrative approach to translating knowledge and building a "learning organization" in health services management". Bull World Health Organ. 84 (8): 652–7. doi:10.2471/blt.05.026922. PMC 2627438. PMID 16917653.
