= Nataphol Teepsuwan =

Thai politician (born 1966)

- ณัฏฐพล ทีปสุวรรณ
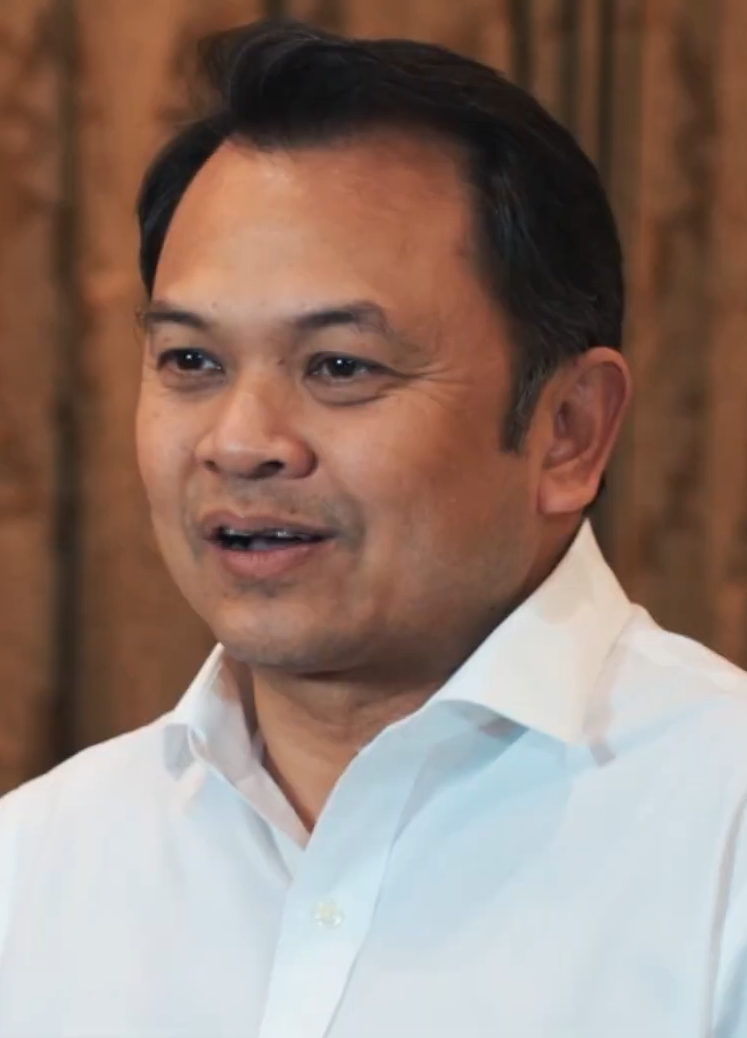
- Nataphol Teepsuwan in 2020

Minister of Education
- In office 10 July 2019 – 24 February 2021
- Prime Minister: Prayut Chan-o-cha
- Preceded by: Teerakiat Jaroensettasin
- Succeeded by: Trinuch Thienthong

Personal details
- Born: 29 May 1966 (age 60) Boston, Massachusetts, U.S.
- Party: Palang Pracharath Party
- Other political affiliations: Democrat Party (2007–18)
- Spouse: Taya Teepsuwan
- Education: Boston University; Thammasat University
- Profession: Businessman; politician

Nataphol Teepsuwan (Thai: ณัฏฐพล ทีปสุวรรณ, RTGS: Natthaphon Thipsuwan; born 29 May 1966) is a Thai politician. He served as Minister of Education in the second cabinet of Prime Minister Prayut Chan-o-cha from 10 July 2019 until he was removed from office. In February 2021, he was found guilty of insurrection during protests that led to the 2014 coup d'état. He was released from prison on bail that same month, which stands in contrast to his sentence still standing at a prison term of seven years and four months.

== Early life and education ==
Nataphol was born on 29 May 1966 in Boston, Massachusetts, United States. He was the son of Viraphan Teepsuwan, Chairman of the Siam City Cement, and Chantima Teepsuwan. He married Taya Teepsuwan and has 3 children.

He graduated high school from The Williston Northampton School in the US and then Bachelor of Business Administration in Marketing, Boston University and master's degree in marketing (English Program), Thammasat University.

== Careers ==
Nataphol is a businessman and the executive of the Campana tile business. He also holds the position of General Manager of Royal Thai Company Limited in the Dubai Branch and overseeing the expansion of "Royal Thai" branded carpet in the Middle East. Nataphol was also the President of Rugby School Thailand.

== Political careers ==
Nataphol turns himself into political careers by running the election for a member of the House of Representatives in the 2007 election for Democrat Party. After the election, he was appointed by the Democratic Party meeting to serve as the Director of the Democratic Party. Later, he resigned from the party on 11 November 2014 to lead the rally against the amnesty law in 2013–2014 Thai political crisis.

After the coup he has joined the Palang Pracharath Party before being elected as a vice-leader on 29 September 2018 to run 2019 Thai general election. On 10 July 2019, he was appointed to the position of Minister of Education. On 24 February 2021, the Criminal Court sentenced Nataphol to imprisonment for seven years and four months, resulting in him immediately terminated his position as Minister of Education.

== Royal decorations ==
- 2012 - Knight Grand Cordon (Special Class) of the Most Exalted Order of the White Elephant
