= Ormsin Chivapruck =

Thai civil servant and politician

Ormsin Chivapruck ออมสิน ชีวะพฤกษ์
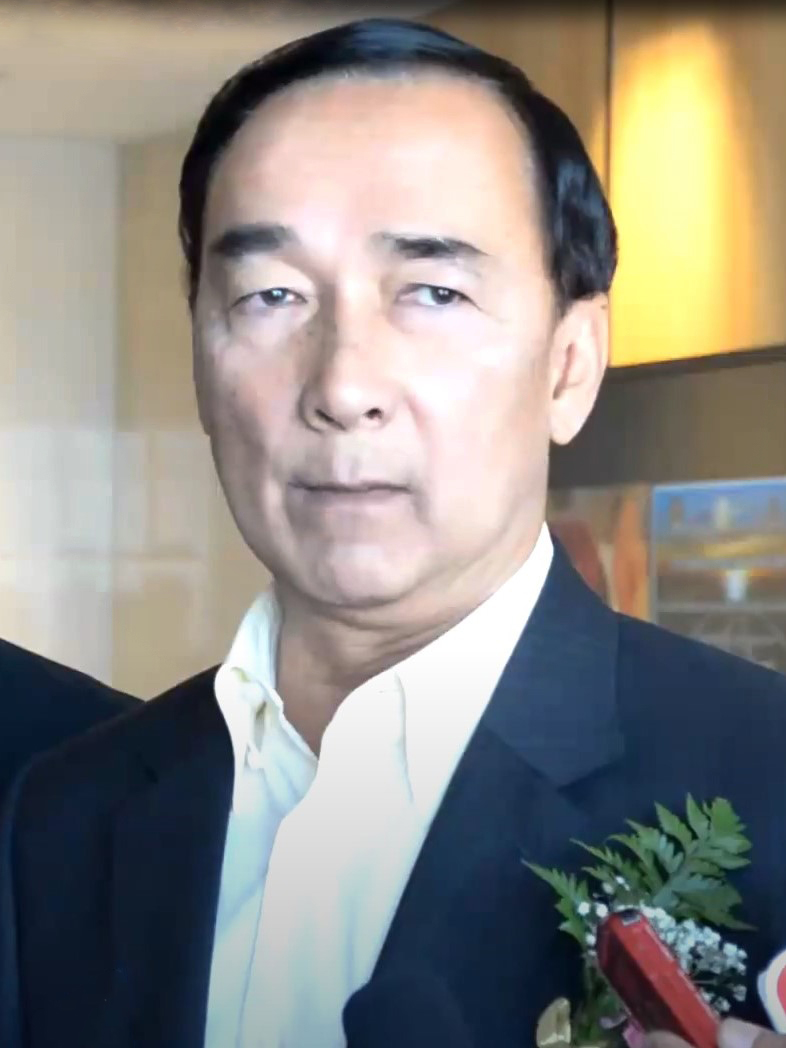
- Ormsin Chivapruck in 2014

Minister to the Office of the Prime Minister
- In office 16 December 2016 – 24 November 2017 Serving with Suvit Maesincee
- Prime Minister: Prayut Chan-o-cha
- Preceded by: Panadda Diskul; Suwaphan Tanyuvardhana
- Succeeded by: Kobsak Pootrakool; Suwaphan Tanyuvardhana

Personal details
- Born: 1 April 1951 (age 75) Pathum Thani, Thailand
- Spouse: Nisa Chivapruck
- Education: Aligarh Muslim University; Kasetsart University; Harvard University

Ormsin Chivapruck (Thai: ออมสิน ชีวะพฤกษ์, RTGS: Omsin Chiwaphruek; born 1 April 1951) is a Thai civil servant and politician who served as Minister to the Office of the Prime Minister in the Cabinet of Thailand from 16 December 2016 to 24 November 2017. He is a former President of Thailand Post.

== Early life ==
Ormsin was born on 1 April 1951 in Pathum Thani Province. He graduated high school level from Wat Hong Pathummawat School before obtaining a Bachelor of Economics from Aligarh Muslim University in India and a Master of Business Administration from Kasetsart University, followed by a degree in the Advanced Management Program from Harvard University.

== Career ==
He used to work under the Communications Authority of Thailand (CAT), holding the highest position as Deputy Governor of the Communications Authority of Thailand. Later, he was appointed Senior Vice President of Finance and thereafter President of the Thai Post Company Limited from 2007 to 2011.

After the coup in Thailand in 2014, under government administration of National Council for Peace and Order, he was appointed Chairman of the State Railway of Thailand. In August 2015, he was appointed Deputy Minister of Transport in the government of Prayut Chan-o-cha. In December 2016, he was appointed as Minister for the Office of the Prime Minister.
