= Teerakiat Jaroensettasin =

Thai politician

- ธีระเกียรติ เจริญเศรษฐศิลป์
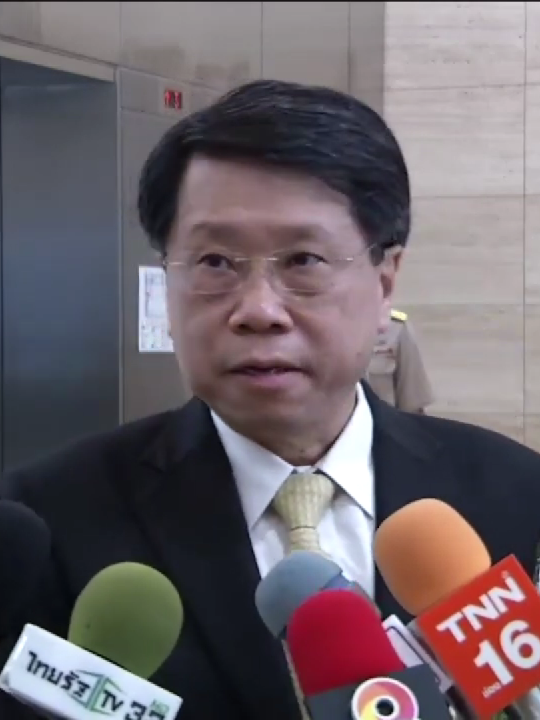

Minister of Education
- In office 15 December 2016 – 8 May 2019
- Preceded by: Dapong Ratanasuwan
- Succeeded by: Nataphol Teepsuwan

Deputy Minister of Education
- In office 19 August 2015 – 15 December 2016
- Prime Minister: Prayut Chan-o-cha
- Preceded by: Krissanapong Kiratikara
- Succeeded by: Panadda Diskul

Personal details
- Born: 3 November 1962 (age 63)

Teerakiat Jaroensettasin (Thai: ธีระเกียรติ เจริญเศรษฐศิลป์, RTGS: Thirakiat Charoensetthasin; born 3 November 1962) is a Thai physician and politician. He served in first Prayuth Chan-o-cha cabinet from 2015 to 2019. He also won the Gusi Peace Prize in 2019.
