= Action Coalition Party =

Thai political party

Action Coalition Party พรรครวมพลัง
- Abbreviation: ACP
- Leader: Danuch Tanterdtid
- Secretary-General: Sunetta Sae-Koh
- Founder: Suthep Thaugsuban; Anek Laothamatas; PDRC
- Founded: 25 May 2018
- Preceded by: People's Democratic Reform Committee
- Headquarters: Bangkok, Thailand
- Membership (2021): 28,694
- Ideology: Conservatism; Nationalism; Reformism; Decentralisation; Monarchism
- Political position: Right-wing
- Colours: Purple
- Slogan: Use wisdom to serve the people (นําปัญญารับใช้ประชาชน)
- House of Representatives: 0 / 500

Website
- https://act-party.org/

The Action Coalition Party (ACP; Thai: พรรครวมพลัง, RTGS: Phak Ruam Phalang'), formerly the Action Coalition for Thailand Party, is a political party in Thailand founded on 25 May 2018 by Tavisak Na Taguathung, the lawyer of Suthep Thaugsuban.

On 3 June 2018, the Action Coalition for Thailand Party held its first meeting and outlined its platform and its determination to reform the country. The party's rhetoric is similar to that of the People's Democratic Reform Committee (PDRC), the main pressure group of the 2013–2014 Thai political crisis. Former PDRC leader Suthep Thaugsuban is ACT's most prominent member, serving as chairman of the campaign committee. Also among the founding members were former Governor of the Bank of Thailand Chatumongol Sonakul, political scientist Anek Laothamatas, and retired police general Vasit Dejkunjorn.

Last logo as the Action Coalition for Thailand Party 2019–2022

On 24 April 2022, Action Coalition for Thailand Party resolved to change its name to Action Coalition Party, hoping people will easily remember it in the next election.
