= Sontirat Sontijirawong =

Thai politician (born 1960)

- สนธิรัตน์ สนธิจิรวงศ์
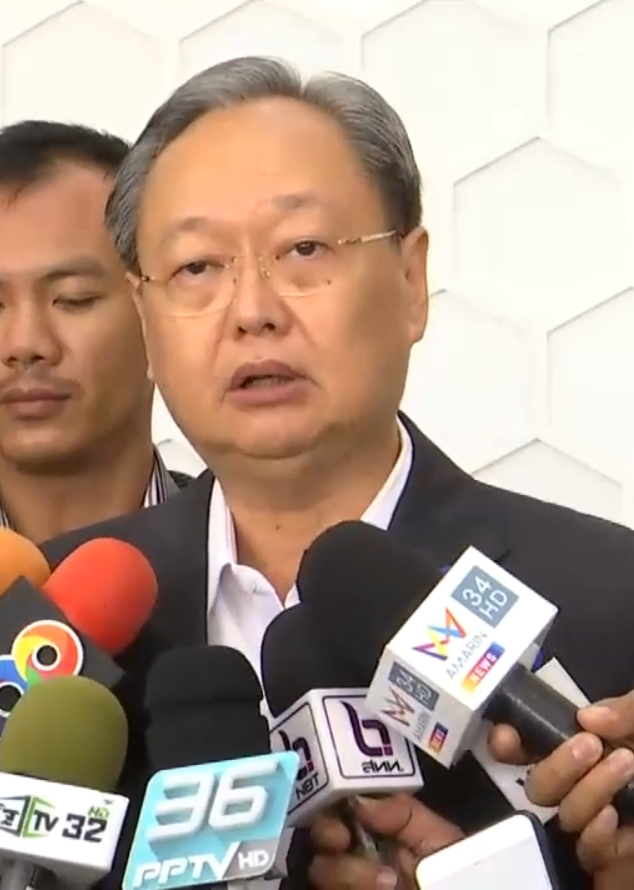
- Sontirat in 2019

Minister of Energy
- In office 10 July 2019 – 15 July 2020
- Prime Minister: Prayut Chan-o-cha
- Preceded by: Siri Jirapongpan
- Succeeded by: Supattanapong Punmeechaow

Minister of Commerce
- In office 23 November 2017 – 29 January 2019
- Prime Minister: Prayut Chan-o-cha
- Preceded by: Apiradi Tantraporn
- Succeeded by: Jurin Laksanawisit

Personal details
- Born: 19 March 1960 (age 66) Kanchanaburi, Thailand
- Party: Palang Pracharath Party (2018-2020), (2023-)
- Other political affiliations: Sang Anakot Thai (2022-2023)
- Education: Chulalongkorn University
- Profession: Businessman; Politician

Sontirat Sontijirawong (Thai: สนธิรัตน์ สนธิจิรวงศ์, RTGS: Sonthirat Sonthichirawong; born 19 March 1960) is a former Thai politician. He served as Minister of Energy in the second cabinet of Prime Minister Prayut Chan-o-cha. Supattanapong Punmeechaow was appointed as his successor. On 19 January 2022, Sontirat formed a new party alongside Uttama Savanayana called Sang Anakot Thai (Building Thailand's Future).

== Early life and education ==
Sontirat born on 19 March 1960 in the area of Mueang Kanchanaburi district (now promoted into Dan Makham Tia district since the 1990s). He holds a bachelor's degree in Material science and a Master of Business Administration from Chulalongkorn University.

== Careers ==
Sontirat was a businessman. He was a former member of the National Reform Council, later he was appointed as an advisor to the Minister of Industry in September 2015 by the advice of Deputy Prime Minister Somkid Jatusripitak and then was appointed as Deputy Minister of Commerce in December 2016 and Minister of Commerce in November 2017. After he joined Palang Pracharath Party in the 2019 Thai general election, he was appointed by Prayut Chan-o-cha to the position of Minister of Energy until July 2020.

== Royal decorations ==
- 2015 - Companion (Fourth Class) of The Most Admirable Order of the Direkgunabhorn
- 2017 - Knight Grand Cross (First Class) Order of the Crown of Thailand
- 2020 - Knight Commander (Second Class) Order of the White Elephant
