= Panadda Diskul =

Thai civil servant and politician

Mom Luang Panadda Diskul ปนัดดา ดิศกุล MPCh MWM TChW
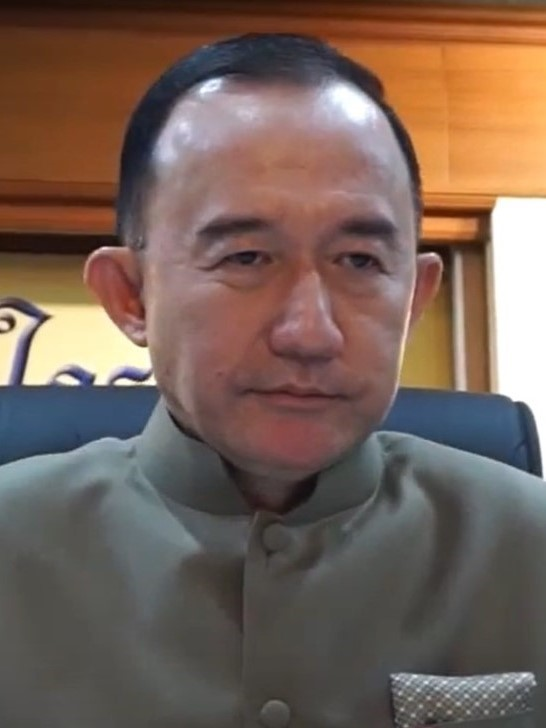

Privy Councillor of Thailand
- Incumbent
- Assumed office 16 May 2026
- Monarch: Vajiralongkorn

Minister attached to the Office of the Prime Minister
- In office 30 August 2014 – 15 December 2016 Serving with Suwaphan Tanyuvardhana
- Prime Minister: Prayut Chan-o-cha
- Preceded by: Santi Promphat
- Succeeded by: Ormsin Chivapruck

Deputy Minister of Education
- In office 15 December 2016 – 23 November 2017
- Prime Minister: Prayut Chan-o-cha
- Minister: Teerakiat Jaroensettasin

Permanent Secretary for the Office of the Prime Minister
- In office 28 May 2014 – 30 September 2015
- Minister: Himself
- Preceded by: Tongthong Chandransu
- Succeeded by: Eak Angsananont

Governor of Chiang Mai Province
- In office 1 October 2010 – 30 September 2012
- Preceded by: Amornphan Nimanan
- Succeeded by: Thanin Suphasan

Personal details
- Born: 26 August 1956 (age 69) Bangkok, Thailand
- Spouse: Amporn Diskul na Ayudhya
- Children: Varadis Diskul na Ayudhya
- Education: Brigham Young University; Sophia University; National Defence College of Thailand

Mom Luang Panadda Diskul (Thai: หม่อมหลวงปนัดดา ดิศกุล RTGS: Panatda Ditsakun; born 26 August 1956) is a Thai politician and government official who serves as a Privy Councillor. He previously served as Minister to the Prime Minister's Office and Deputy Minister of Education in the government of Prayut Chan-o-cha. A former Senator and Permanent Secretary of the Office of the Prime Minister, his career in the Ministry of Interior includes serving as Deputy Permanent Secretary, Governor of Nakhon Pathom and Chiang Mai, and Deputy Governor of Samut Sakhon, Pathum Thani, and Buriram.

== Early life and education ==
Panadda Diskul is the only son of Mom Rajawongse Sangkadis Diskul, a diplomat who served as ambassador of Thailand to Malaysia, Switzerland, the Vatican and founder of the Varadis Palace Museum Foundation and Manthana Diskul na Ayudhya. He is a great-grandson of Prince Damrong Rajanubhab, the first Minister of the Interior of Siam. The name "Panadda" comes from Pali and means "great-grandson"; His nickname is Khun Len (คุณเหลน), also meaning "great-grandson". The lower nobility title Mom Luang indicates his remote royal lineage. Panadda is married to Amporn Diskul na Ayudhya, they have one son.

Panadda attended Prasarnmit Demonstration School (a high school attached to Srinakharinwirot University) and completed his schooling in Australia at The King's School, Parramatta (as did Vajiralongkorn, the future King Rama X). He studied at Brigham Young University, graduating with a master's degree in international relations. Later he completed courses in Thai-Japanese history at Sophia University, and in higher administration at the National Defence College of Thailand in 2007.

== Careers ==
After graduation, Panadda taught as a lecturer in law and social sciences at the Chulachomklao Royal Military Academy. He then became an official in the Ministry of the Interior, initially working in the Foreign Affairs Division in the position of Foreign Affairs Officer. In 1998, he was appointed Director of Political and Administrative Strategy in the Strategy and Planning Office. The following year he became the Office Director of the Minister of the Interior. In 2003, Panadda moved to the provincial administration and became deputy governor of Samut Sakhon Province. A year later, he took up the same post in Pathum Thani Province, and in 2007, Buri Ram Province. During this period, he simultaneously served as a security consultant in the office of the Permanent Secretary in the Ministry of the Interior.

In 2009, he was appointed as provincial governor of Nakhon Pathom, and in 2011 as that of Chiang Mai Province. After two years in Chiang Mai, he returned to the Interior Ministry, where he was appointed Deputy Permanent Secretary for security and foreign affairs.

=== Privy Councillor ===
Following the completion of his term as a Senator, on 16 May 2026, Vajiralongkorn appointed Mom Luang Panadda as a Privy Councillor. He succeeded Supachai Phungam, who had resigned from the position due to health reasons.

== Political careers ==
After the coup of 2014, Panadda was moved to the Office of the Prime Minister, where in 2015 he was first Permanent Secretary before being appointed as a minister of the Prime Minister's Office. In a cabinet reshuffle in December 2016, Panadda was moved to the Ministry of Education as Deputy Minister. According to disclosures provided to the National Anti-Corruption Commission, Panadda was the richest member of the Cabinet at the beginning of 2017, with assets of 1.3 billion baht. His fortune consists mainly of valuable land in the Bangkok districts of Nang Loeng and Bang Sue. Among other things, Panadda owns and manages Prince Damrong Rajanubhab Civil Servant Training School of the Varadis Palace Museum & Library, the former residence of his great-grandfather, and home to the Damrong Rajanubhab Library.

== Awards and decorations ==
Panadda Diskul is an Honorary Doctor of Administrative Sciences from Rajabhat University of Chiang Mai and Maejo University. He is a Knight Grand Cordon, Special Class of the Order of the White Elephant and the Order of the Crown of Thailand, and a Grand Companion (Third Class) of the Order of Chula Chom Klao.

Government offices
Preceded by Santi Promphat	Minister to the Office of the Prime Minister; 30 August 2014 - 15 December 2016	Succeeded by Ormsin Chivapruck
