= Suwaphan Tanyuvardhana =

Thai officer and politician (born 1953)

Suwaphan Tanyuvardhana MPCh MWM
- สุวพันธุ์ ตันยุวรรธนะ
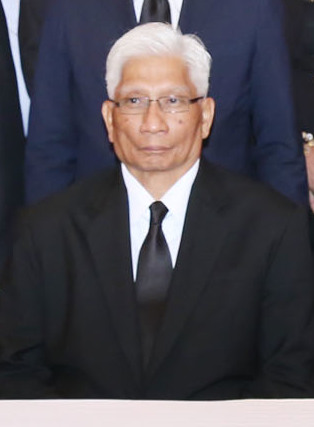
- Suwaphan Tanyuvardhana in 2017

Minister attached to the Office of the Prime Minister
- In office 23 November 2017 – 8 May 2019 Serving with Kobsak Pootrakool
- Prime Minister: Prayut Chan-o-cha
- Preceded by: Ormsin Chivapruck; Suvit Maesincee
- Succeeded by: Tewan Liptapanlop
- In office 30 August 2014 – 15 December 2016 Serving with Panadda Diskul
- Prime Minister: Prayut Chan-o-cha
- Preceded by: Varathep Ratanakorn
- Succeeded by: Ormsin Chivapruck; Suvit Maesincee

Minister of Justice
- In office 15 December 2016 – 23 November 2017
- Prime Minister: Prayut Chan-o-cha
- Preceded by: Paiboon Koomchaya
- Succeeded by: Prajin Juntong

Director of the National Intelligence Agency
- In office 1 September 2009 – 30 September 2014
- Prime Minister: Abhisit Vejjajiva; Yingluck Shinawatra; Prayut Chan-o-cha
- Preceded by: Adul Korwatana
- Succeeded by: Chatpong Chatrakom

Personal details
- Born: December 23, 1953 (age 72) Ratchaburi, Thailand
- Spouse: Rungnapa Tanyuvardhana
- Education: Chiang Mai University

Suwaphan Tanyuvardhana (Thai: สุวพันธุ์ ตันยุวรรธนะ, RTGS: Suwaphan Tanyuwatthana; born 23 December 1953 in Ratchaburi) is a Thai officer and politician. He is a former director of the National Intelligence Agency from 2009 until 2014.

== Early life ==
Suwaphan was born on 23 December 1953 in Ratchaburi Province.

Suwaphan attended high school at Daruna Ratchaburi School and Triam Udom Suksa School and then study at Faculty of Law, Chiang Mai University.

== Early career ==
Suwaphan took government service under the National Intelligence Agency previously served as Deputy Director and was the director of the National Intelligence Agency in 2009. He also served as a committee in the Emergency Situation Center during the government of Abhisit Vejjajiva and continued to work in the government, Yingluck Shinawatra and the government of General Prayut Chan-o-cha until his retirement on 30 September 2014.

== Political career ==
In August 2014, he was appointed Minister to the Prime Minister's Office in the government of General Prayut Chan-o-cha. Later in December 2016, he was appointed Minister of Justice. Later in November 2017, he was appointed as Minister for the Office of the Prime Minister again after having held the position when he started the Cabinet.

Later on May 7, 2019, Suwapan submitted a resignation letter from the Prime Minister's Office to General Prayut Chan-o-cha, Prime Minister, to hold the position senator which will take effect the next day, which is on Wednesday 8 May 2019.

== Royal decorations ==
Suwaphan has received the following royal decorations in the Honours System of Thailand:

- Knight Grand Cordon (Special Class) of The Most Noble Order of the Crown of Thailand
- Knight Grand Cordon (Special Class) of the Most Exalted Order of the White Elephant
