= Uttama Savanayana =

Thai politician (born 1960)

- อุตตม สาวนายน
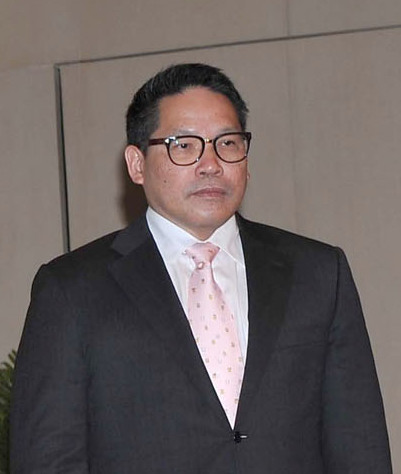
- Uttama Savayana in 2016

Minister of Finance
- In office 10 July 2019 – 15 July 2020
- Prime Minister: Prayut Chan-o-cha
- Preceded by: Apisak Tantivorawong
- Succeeded by: Predee Daochai

Leader of the Palang Pracharath Party
- In office 29 September 2018 – 27 June 2020
- Preceded by: Position established
- Succeeded by: Prawit Wongsuwan

Minister of Industry
- In office 16 December 2016 – 29 January 2019
- Prime Minister: Prayut Chan-o-cha
- Preceded by: Atchaka Sibunruang
- Succeeded by: Suriya Juangroongruangkit

Minister of Information and Communication Technology
- In office 19 August 2015 – 12 September 2016
- Prime Minister: Prayut Chan-o-cha
- Preceded by: Pornchai Rujiprapa
- Succeeded by: Prajin Juntong (acting)

Personal details
- Born: 19 May 1960 (age 66) Bangkok, Thailand
- Party: Palang Pracharath Party (2018-2020), (2023-2025); Sang Anakot Thai Party (2022-2023)
- Spouse: Itchaya Savanayana
- Education: Brown University; University of Massachusetts Amherst
- Profession: Businessman; professor; politician

Uttama Savanayana (Thai: อุตตม สาวนายน, RTGS: Uttama Sawanayon; born 19 May 1960) is a Thai politician. He served as Minister of Finance in the second cabinet of Prime Minister Prayut Chan-o-cha. He resigned in July 2020. On 19 January 2022, Savanayana formed a new party called Sang Anakot Thai (Building Thailand's Future) along with Sontirat Sontijirawong.

== Early life and education ==
Uttam Saanayana was born on 19 May 1960 to be the son of Lek and Ya Yee Savanayana. He graduated from primary and secondary school from Chulalongkorn University Demonstration School and bachelor's degree in electrical engineering From Brown University, USA. Then he studied Master of Business Administration (Finance and International Business) at Kellogg School of Management, Northwestern University and Ph.D. in Financial Management, Isenberg School of Management, University of Massachusetts Amherst.

== Careers ==
Uttama is a private financial institution manager. He worked as a teacher in a higher education institution and became Deputy Dean of Academic Department and Lecturer in the Faculty of Finance, National Institute of Development Administration and was appointed rector of Bangkok University in June 2015. He was an advisor to the Minister of Finance, Somkid Jatusripitak and Assistant Minister to the Prime Minister's Office. Later in 2015, he was appointed Minister of Information and Communication Technology in the government of Prayut Chan-o-cha but submitted a resignation letter on 12 September 2016 to have the appointment of the Digital Economy and Society Minister, a ministry to be established. He was appointed an advisor to the Prime Minister on 15 September 2016. In December 2016, he was appointed Minister of Industry and Minister of Finance respectively.

== Royal decorations ==
- 2017 - Knight Grand Cordon (Special Class) of the Most Exalted Order of the White Elephant
- 2020 - Knight Grand Cordon (Special Class) of The Most Noble Order of the Crown of Thailand

Political offices
Preceded by Apisak Tantivorawong	Minister of Finance; 2019–2020	Succeeded by Predee Daochai
