= Benjamin Mauerberger =

South African fixer

- Citizenship: South Africa; Cambodia
- Spouse: Cattaliya Beevor

Benjamin Mauerberger, also known as Ben Smith and Benjamin Berger, is a South African fixer.

== Career ==
=== Boiler room operation ===
In October 2003, Mauerberger was fined $30,000 and banned for seven years as a broker by the New Zealand Securities Commission for his role in Maeur-Swisse, an Auckland-based boiler room operation.

=== Scam center investigation ===
In late September 2025, investigative journalist Tom Wright, writing in the Whale Hunting newsletter, published a monthlong investigation on Mauerberger's ties to a $1.5 billion money laundering network tied to scam centers in Southeast Asia. Wright had published photographs of Mauerberger with former Prime Minister of Thailand Thaksin Shinawatra and Thammanat Prompow.

On 19 September 2025, the Dismantle Foreign Scam Syndicates Act was introduced to the US House of Representatives by Representative Jefferson Shreve, listing Mauerberger on "A list of all foreign persons sanctioned by the United States for being responsible for, complicit in, or responsible for ordering, controlling, or otherwise directing, online financial scams against United States nationals."

The reports were cited in a 30 September 2025 session of Thailand's Parliament by Opposition MP Rangsiman Rome, alleging Mauerberger had sought Thai nationality on 22 October 2024, but his application was denied due to incomplete documents. Mauerberger subsequently filed a defamation lawsuit against Rangsiman. Rangsiman alleged Mauerberger was also an advisor to former Cambodian Prime Minister Hun Sen and his son, current Cambodian Prime Minister Hun Manet. Mauerberger's lawyer Thanadon Suwannarit claimed that Mauerberger knew Thammanat Prompow through Thaksin Shinawatra.

On 21 October 2025, Thammanat denied links to Mauerberger's network of scam centers, urging the public not to jump to conclusions about Mauerberger. On 21 October 2025, Wright published an article detailing how both Thailand's Deputy Minister of Finance Vorapak Tanyawong's wife Kanokporn and Mauerberger held shares in the same Singapore-based fund.

Following the publication of the Whale Hunting investigation, Thailand's Deputy Minister of Finance Vorapak Tanyawong resigned on 22 October 2025 after allegations that his wife was paid by Mauerberger's criminal network he was appointed to investigate.

On 6 November 2025, Winyat Chartmontree, personal lawyer for former Prime Minister Thaksin Shinawatra, stated that Shinawatra and Mauerberger were just acquaintances and that Thaksin had not invested in any of his businesses.

In December 2025, the Thai government seized $300 million in assets connected to Mauerberger's network, and issued arrest warrants for 42 individuals.

In December 2025, photos were leaked showing Mauerberger posing with Prime Minister Anutin Charnvirakul, Deputy Prime Minister Ekniti Nitithanprapas, former army chief Gen Apirat Kongsompong, former senator Upakit Pachariyangkun, and former national police inspector-general Pol Gen Visanu Prasarttongosoth. The photos were likewise questioned by MP Rangsiman on Facebook, who questioned whether action had not been taken against him due to his connections to prominent Thai politicians.

On 21 December 2025, Thailand's Department of Special Investigation (DSI) announced that it would will summon former Digital Economy and Society (DES) Minister Prasert Jantararuangtong to discuss his role in signing an MOU in Singapore in the presence of Mauerberger.

== Personal life ==
In addition to holding South African citizenship, Mauerberger was reported to hold a Cambodian diplomatic passport. Mauerberger later applied for Thai citizenship when Anutin was interior minister, but he did not approve Mauerberger's application.

Mauerberger is married to Cattaliya Beevor, a Thai national.
