= First Anutin cabinet =

Government of Thailand (2025–2026)

- 65th Council of Ministers of Thailand
- 2025-2026
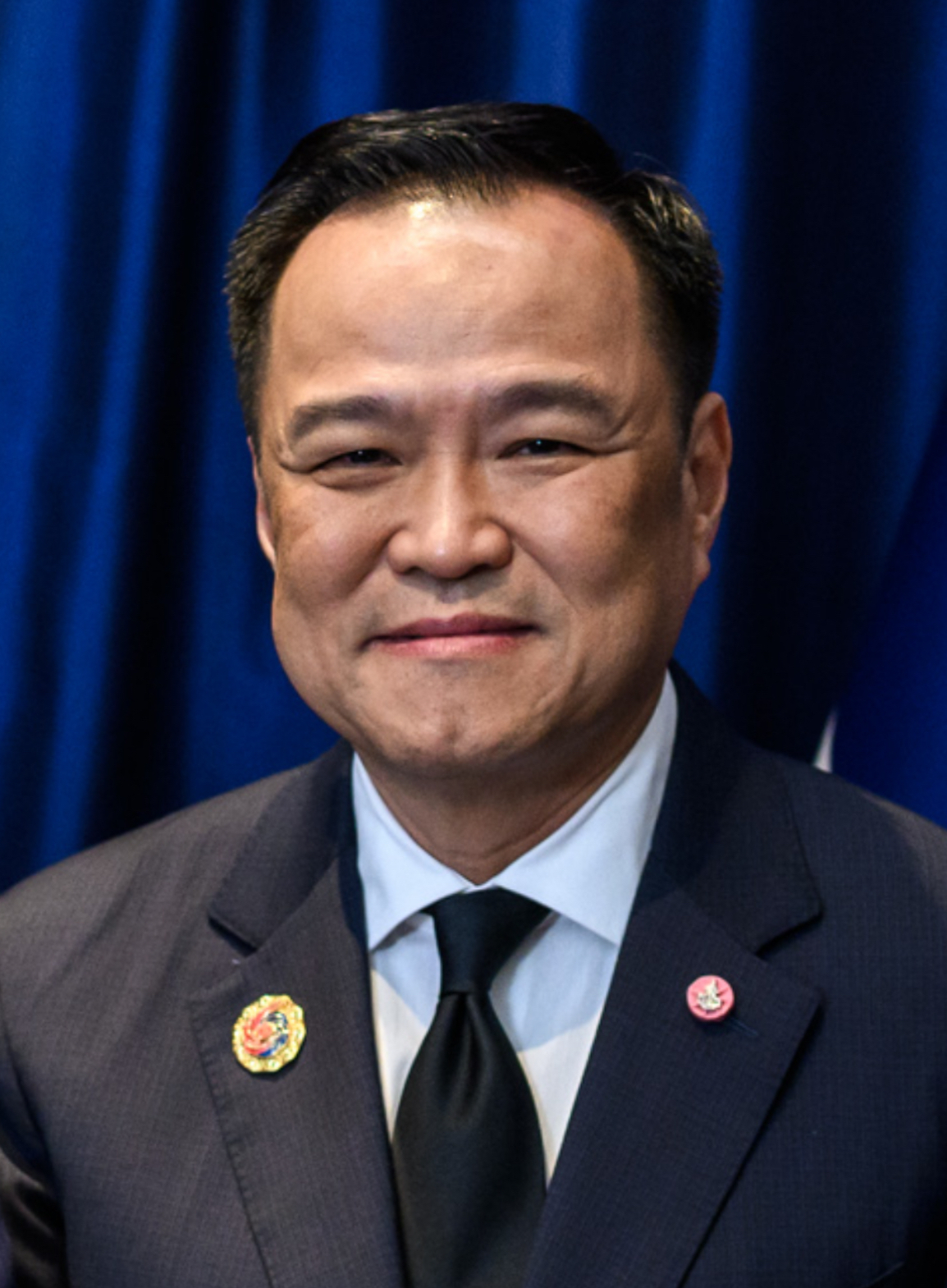
- Date formed: 19 September 2025
- Date dissolved: 30 March 2026

People and organisations
- Monarch: Vajiralongkorn
- Prime Minister: Anutin Charnvirakul
- Deputy Prime Minister: Phipat Ratchakitprakarn; Sophon Saram; Borwornsak Uwanno; Ekniti Nitithanprapas; Thamanat Prompow; Suchart Chomklin
- Member party: Bhumjaithai; United Thai Nation (18 Group and Akanat's Group); Kla Tham; Palang Pracharath; Pheu Thai (Sakda's Group); Thai Sang Thai; Democrat (Sanphet's Group); New Democracy; Thai Progress Party
- Status in legislature: Minority coalition government With confidence and supply from People's Party (Note: In opposition, but supports the government under five conditions in the MOA.)
- Opposition party: People's; Pheu Thai; Democrat; Chartthaipattana; Palang Pracharath; United Thai Nation; Chart Pattana Party; Thai Ruam Palang; Thai Sang Thai; Thai Liberal; Fair Party
- Opposition leader: Natthaphong Ruengpanyawut

History
- Legislature term: HoR 26th: 2023–2025
- Predecessor: Paetongtarn cabinet
- Successor: Second Anutin cabinet

The First Anutin cabinet, formally known as the 65th Council of Ministers, (Note: Thai: คณะรัฐมนตรีไทย คณะที่ 65) was formed after the removal of Paetongtarn Shinawatra as Prime Minister of Thailand. The coalition is led by the Bhumjaithai Party, which nominated Anutin Charnvirakul as its candidate for prime minister. Anutin's candidacy was supported by the People's Party, but the party remains in opposition and does not have ministers in the cabinet.

In forming the government, the Bhumjaithai Party led a coalition of eight political parties, winning a total of 146 seats in the Thai House of Representatives. The party nominated its leader, Anutin Charnvirakul, as Thailand's 32nd Prime Minister. Although the People's Party supported the appointment of the Prime Minister, it chose not to join the government, instead serving in opposition alongside the Pheu Thai Party and some of its former coalition partners. This marked the first minority government in Thailand in 50 years, since the Second Seni cabinet.

== History ==
Anutin was elected as prime minister on 5 September 2025 and received the appointment from the royal command on 7 September 2025.

The cabinet was officially sworn into office by King Vajiralongkorn on 24 September 2025.

== Election of the prime minister ==
5 September 2025; Nomination of Anutin Charnvirakul (PTP) and Chaikasem Nitisiri (PTP) as Prime Minister; Absolute majority: 247/492
Vote	Parties	Votes
Anutin Charnvirakul	People's (143), Bhumjaithai Party (68), United Thai Nation (33), Kla Tham (25), Palang Pracharath (18), Pheu Thai (9), Thai Sang Thai (6), Thai Liberal (1), Democrat (4), New Democracy (1), Fair (1), Thai Progress (1)	311 / 492
Chaikasem Nitisiri	Pheu Thai (128), Chart Thai Pattana (10), Prachachart (8), Palang Pracharath (2), Chart Pattana (2), Thai Ruam Palang (2)	152 / 492
Abstain	Democrat (20), United Thai Nation (3), Pheu Thai (2), Bhumjaithai (1), Prachachart Party (1)	27 / 492
Not voting	Pheu Thai (1), Democrat (1)	2 / 492

== List of ministers ==
Portfolio	Order	Minister	Took office	Left office	Party
Prime Minister	–	Anutin Charnvirakul	7 September 2025	19 March 2026	Bhumjaithai
Deputy Prime Ministers	1	Phipat Ratchakitprakarn	19 September 2025	30 March 2026	Bhumjaithai
Deputy Prime Ministers	2	Sophon Saram	19 September 2025	16 March 2026	Bhumjaithai
Deputy Prime Ministers	3	Borwornsak Uwanno	19 September 2025	30 March 2026	Independent
Deputy Prime Ministers	4	Ekniti Nitithanpraphat	19 September 2025	30 March 2026	Independent
Deputy Prime Ministers	4	Ekniti Nitithanpraphat	19 September 2025	30 March 2026	Bhumjaithai
Deputy Prime Ministers	5	Thamanat Prompow	19 September 2025	30 March 2026	Kla Tham
Deputy Prime Ministers	6	Suchart Chomklin	19 September 2025	30 March 2026	Bhumjaithai
Office of the Prime Minister	7	Paradorn Prissananantakul	19 September 2025	30 March 2026	Bhumjaithai
Office of the Prime Minister	8	Supamas Isarabhakdi	19 September 2025	30 March 2026	Bhumjaithai
Office of the Prime Minister	9	Napinthorn Srisanpang	19 September 2025	30 March 2026	Bhumjaithai
Office of the Prime Minister	10	Santi Piyatat	19 September 2025	30 March 2026	Independent (Note: Santi Piyatat joined the cabinet on behalf of Palang Pracharath Party, but is not affiliated with the party.)
Office of the Prime Minister	10	Santi Piyatat	19 September 2025	30 March 2026	Bhumjaithai
Minister of Defence	11	Natthaphon Narkphanit	19 September 2025	30 March 2026	Independent
Deputy Minister of Defence	12	Adul Boonthamcharoen	19 September 2025	30 March 2026	Independent
Minister of Finance	*	Ekniti Nitithanpraphat	19 September 2025	30 March 2026	Independent
Minister of Finance	*	Ekniti Nitithanpraphat	19 September 2025	30 March 2026	Bhumjaithai
Deputy Ministers of Finance	*	Vorapak Tanyawong	19 September 2025	22 October 2025	Independent
Minister of Foreign Affairs	13	Sihasak Phuangketkeow	19 September 2025	30 March 2026	Independent
Minister of Foreign Affairs	13	Sihasak Phuangketkeow	19 September 2025	30 March 2026	Bhumjaithai
Minister of Tourism and Sports	14	Atthakorn Sirilatthayakorn	19 September 2025	30 March 2026	Kla Tham
Minister of Social Development and Human Security	15	Akara Prompow	19 September 2025	30 March 2026	Kla Tham
Minister of Higher Education, Science, Research and Innovation	16	Surasak Phanchareonworakul	19 September 2025	30 March 2026	Bhumjaithai
Minister of Agriculture and Cooperatives	*	Thamanat Prompow	19 September 2025	30 March 2026	Kla Tham
Deputy Ministers of Agriculture and Cooperatives	17	Amin Mayuso	19 September 2025	30 March 2026	Kla Tham
Deputy Ministers of Agriculture and Cooperatives	18	Nares Thamrongthipyakhun	19 September 2025	30 March 2026	Kla Tham
Minister of Transport	*	Phipat Ratchakitprakarn	19 September 2025	30 March 2026	Bhumjaithai
Deputy Ministers of Transport	19	Mallika Jiraphanwanich	19 September 2025	16 March 2026	Bhumjaithai
Minister of Digital Economy and Society	20	Chaichanok Chidchob	19 September 2025	30 March 2026	Bhumjaithai
Minister of Natural Resources and Environment	*	Suchart Chomklin	19 September 2025	30 March 2026	United Thai Nation (18 Group)
Minister of Natural Resources and Environment	*	Suchart Chomklin	19 September 2025	30 March 2026	Bhumjaithai
Minister of Energy	21	Atthaphon Rerkpiboon	19 September 2025	30 March 2026	Independent
Minister of Commerce	22	Suphajee Suthumpun	19 September 2025	30 March 2026	Independent
Minister of Commerce	22	Suphajee Suthumpun	19 September 2025	30 March 2026	Bhumjaithai
Minister of Interior	*	Anutin Charnvirakul	19 September 2025	30 March 2026	Bhumjaithai
Deputy Ministers of Interior	23	Songsak Thongsri	19 September 2025	30 March 2026	Bhumjaithai
Deputy Ministers of Interior	24	Sakda Wichiansilp	19 September 2025	30 March 2026	Bhumjaithai
Deputy Ministers of Interior	25	Sasithorn Kittithorakul	19 September 2025	30 March 2026	Bhumjaithai
Minister of Justice	26	Rutthaphon Naowarat	19 September 2025	30 March 2026	Independent
Minister of Labour	27	Treenuch Thienthong	19 September 2025	30 March 2026	Palang Pracharath
Minister of Culture	28	Sabida Thaiseth	19 September 2025	30 March 2026	Bhumjaithai
Minister of Education	29	Narumon Pinyosinwat	19 September 2025	30 March 2026	Kla Tham
Deputy Minister of Education	30	Ong-art Wongprayoon	19 September 2025	30 March 2026	Kla Tham
Minister of Public Health	31	Pattana Promphat	19 September 2025	30 March 2026	Palang Pracharath
Minister of Public Health	31	Pattana Promphat	19 September 2025	30 March 2026	Bhumjaithai
Deputy Minister of Public Health	32	Worachot Sukonkhajorn	19 September 2025	30 March 2026	Palang Pracharath
Deputy Minister of Public Health	32	Worachot Sukonkhajorn	19 September 2025	30 March 2026	Bhumjaithai
Minister of Industry	33	Thanakorn Wangboonkhongchana	19 September 2025	30 March 2026	United Thai Nation (18 Group)
Minister of Industry	33	Thanakorn Wangboonkhongchana	19 September 2025	30 March 2026	Bhumjaithai
Deputy Minister of Industry	34	Yossing Liamlert	19 September 2025	30 March 2026	United Thai Nation (18 Group)
Deputy Minister of Industry	34	Yossing Liamlert	19 September 2025	30 March 2026	Kla Tham
