= Asda Jayanama =

Thai diplomat (1941–2026)

Asda Jayanama (Thai: อัษฎา ชัยนาม; RTGS: Atsada Chaiyanam; 17 September 1941 – 12 January 2026) was a Thai career diplomat. He is noted for his criticisms of the Myanmar military regime, Thai Prime Minister Thaksin Shinawatra, and former Thai Foreign Minister Surakiart Sathirathai.

== Early life and education ==
Asda Jayanama was born in Bangkok on 17 September 1941, to a family of diplomats. He was related to Direk Jayanama, ambassador to Japan during World War II. His younger brother, Surapong Jayanama, was ambassador to Germany, Vietnam, and South Africa. Another brother, Apipong, was former Director General of the Department of American and South Pacific Affairs. Asda was married and had two children.

Asda studied at Bangkok Christian College in Thailand and Denstone College in England. He graduated from the University of California, Los Angeles in 1964 with a B.A. and 1965 with a M.A. in economics.

== Career in diplomacy ==
Jayanama joined the Ministry of Foreign Affairs of Thailand in 1966. He served as Second Secretary at the Royal Thai Embassy to Burma from 1969-1973. He was afterwards appointed Chief of the South and West Asia Division in the Political Department in 1973. From 1974 to 1976 he was made Chief of the International Development Affairs Division, International Organizations Department.

From 1976 to 1979, he was appointed First Secretary of the Royal Thai Embassy in Vienna, where he was also the Alternate Representative of Thailand to the United Nations Industrial Development Organization (UNIDO) and International Atomic Energy Agency (IAEA). Afterwards, he was made Chief of the African and Arabian Affairs Division back at the Headquarters. He was promoted and served the South-East Asia Division as Director from 1979 to 1981.

From 1981 to 1984, he was transferred to Paris where he served as Deputy Representative of Thailand to the United Nations Educational, Scientific and Cultural Organization (UNESCO). He became ambassador to Vietnam from 1984 to 1986, ambassador to Singapore from 1986 to 1990, and ambassador to New Zealand from 1990 to 1993.

Asda became Director-General of the Department of International Organizations from 1993 to 1995. Along with his brother, Surapong Jayanama, Asda led negotiations that resulted in the entry of Myanmar into the Association of Southeast Asian Nations (ASEAN) in 1997. He afterwards was appointed Thailand's ambassador to the United Nations from 1996 to 2001. He retired after finishing his posting to the UN.

== Criticism of Myanmar regime ==
As a diplomat, Asda long had outspoken views against the military government of Myanmar. After retiring from government service, he increased his criticism of the regime, noting that "ASEAN's constructive engagement policies have failed...The Asean values of non-interference of domestic affairs and quiet diplomacy should be re-examined and reinterpreted for modern times". He also noted "What then did ASEAN get from Burma's entry [into ASEAN]? Actually nothing, except problems... Burma never respects Asean's rules and even tried to get Asean to adjust to its own needs. And Asean just let that happen... If we compare Asean to a dog, and Burma as its tail, it seems that the tail is now wagging the dog".

Asda's brother, Surapong, was also a strong critic of the Myanmar regime and called Thailand's policy to Myanmar "Eight Long Years of Disgrace". vSome have viewed the transfer of Surapong from Director General of the East Asia Department to become ambassador to Germany as being punishment for being too outspoken.

After the government of Thaksin Shinawatra continued the Chuan Leekpai government's policy of engaging Myanmar, Asda's starting publicly criticizing Thaksin and Foreign Minister Surakiart Sathirathai. Asda claimed that Thailand's policy was due to Thai business interests in Myanmar. Regarding Surakiart's road map for reconciliation with Myanmar, Asda noted that "It was clear to diplomats, even junior officers, at the Foreign Ministry that the Thai road map was doomed from the very beginning". He called the Thai policy "greenhorn" and noted "it may not be obvious to fly-by-night politicians, but to well trained diplomats it is political common sense that the (Myanmar) State Peace and Development Council would never accept the Thai proposal for holding a forum".

== Criticism of Thaksin Government and Surakiart Sathirathai ==
In 2003, Asda's younger brother Apipong, Director General of the Department of American and South Pacific Affairs, and his Deputy, Isorn Pocmontri, were transferred by Foreign Minister Surakiart Sathirathai to the Institute of Foreign Affairs. The Jayanama family viewed this as an inactive post, although the Ministry noted several challenges faced by the Institute. Asda unsuccessfully sought to challenge the transfer in the Administrative Court.

Asda joined his brother, Surapong (who had recently declared candidacy in the Thai Senate elections), and Kasit Piromya, former Thai ambassador to the US, in publicly criticizing Thaksin in mass protests in early 2006. In public rallies, Asda claimed that Thaksin's two state visits to India during his first term were fuelled by his personal interests to strike a satellite deal for the family-owned Shin Corp.

Asda's views were criticized by Foreign Minister Kantathi Suphamongkhon. Regarding Asda's claim that Thaksin's state visit to India was to seal a deal for Shinawatra Satellite, Kantathi said "I travelled with the prime minister and was by his side from dusk to dawn. I can guarantee he never talked about personal matters".

He was exceptionally vocal in his attack on former Foreign Minister Surakiart Sathirathai, noting that "Because we have a weak foreign minister who responded to Thaksin as if he was his servant, we have been unable to solve any problems". He also attacked Surakiart's bid for Secretary General of the UN, claiming that he was a poor choice for the UN top post and that he had no chance of getting the job.

Asda also claimed that Surakiart Sathirathai parked his car outside the official residence of UN secretary-general at night so he could see it. "It's very embarrassing," Asda told the crowd.

Asda also called Surakiart "a third rate politician", "clumsy", "bungling", and "lacking a brand name".

Deputy Prime Minister Surakiart Sathirathai threatened to file a defamation suit if Asda did not stop tarnishing his reputation in public.

== Death ==
Jayanama died on 12 January 2026, at the age of 84.
