= Thawisan Ladawan =

Thai nobility and privy councillor

Mom Luang Thawisan Ladawan
- ทวีสันต์ ลดาวัลย์
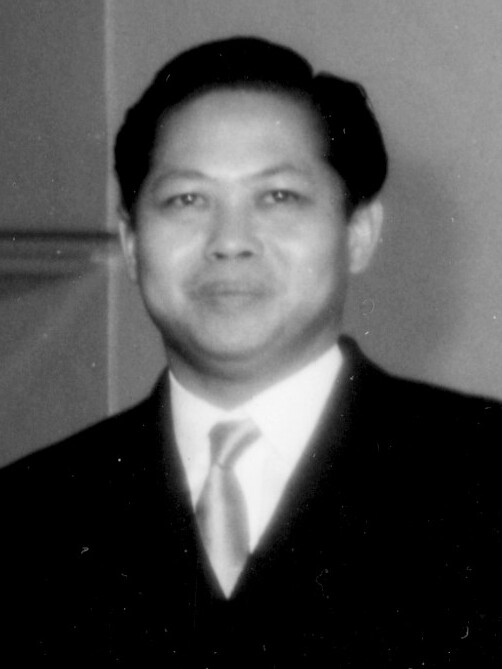

His Majesty's Principal Private Secretary
- In office 18 September 1969 – 1 October 1994
- Monarch: Bhumibol Adulyadej
- Preceded by: Nikorntewan Devakula
- Succeeded by: Peerapong Kasemsri

Personal details
- Born: Thawisan Ladawan; 26 January 1924 Bangkok, Thailand
- Died: 7 April 2006 (aged 82) Bangkok, Thailand
- Spouse: Busba Kitiyakara
- Children: Suthawan Sathirathai
- Parent(s): Bung Ladawan; Nueang Bunnag
- Occupation: Diplomat

Thawisan Ladawan (Thai: ทวีสันต์ ลดาวัลย์; 26 January 1924 – 7 April 2006) was husband of Busba Kitiyakara (younger sister of Queen Sirikit), a member of King Bhumibol Adulyadej's Privy Council, and for 26 years, Principal Private Secretary to King Bhumibol Adulyadej.

== Education ==
Thawisan attended Vajiravudh College and graduated from the inaugural class of Faculty of Law, Thammasat University in 1938.

== Career ==
After graduating, he worked in the Ministry of Foreign Affairs in several capitals, including Paris and Brussels, and earned a Diplome d'Etudes Superieures de Droit International Public from Paris University in 1954. He became Deputy Director-General of the Protocol Department before departing in 1968 to serve as Deputy Principal Private Secretary to Bhumibol. A year later he became Bhumibol's Principal Private Secretary, and was later appointed to the Privy Council.

== Family ==
Thawisan was the son of Phra Phum Phichai (Mom Ratchawong Bung Ladawan) and Nueang Bunnag. His father was the ruler of Chaiyaphum Province, Lamphun Province, Mae Hong Son Province, and Kamphaeng Phet Province.

Thawisan married Busba Kitiyakara in 1958. They had a daughter, Suthawan Ladawan Sathirathai on 24 September 1958. He divorced her soon afterwards and never remarried. Suthawan married Surakiart Sathirathai.

== Death ==
He died at the age of 82 of chronic liver disease.

== Honours ==
=== Thai honours ===
- Knight Grand Cross (First Class) of the Most Illustrious Order of Chula Chom Klao (1984)
- Knight Grand Cordon (Special Class) of the Most Exalted Order of the White Elephant (1978)
- Knight Grand Cordon (Special Class) of the Most Noble Order of the Crown of Thailand (1975)
- Chakrabarti Mala Medal (1974)
- Royal Cypher Medal of King Rama IX, 2nd Class (1971)
- Court Medal of King Rama IX (1960)

=== Foreign honour ===
- West Germany: Grand Cross First Class of the Order of Merit of the Federal Republic of Germany (1984)
