= Umesh Pandey =

Thai journalist and politician

- อุเมส ปานเดย์

Thai Trade Representative
- Incumbent
- Assumed office 5 November 2024
- Prime Minister: Paetongtarn Shinawatra

Umesh Pandey (Thai: อุเมส ปานเดย์) is a Thai journalist and politician, currently serving as Thai Trade Representative. Umesh previously served as editor of the Bangkok Post and an adviser to the Pheu Thai Party economic policy committee. He also served as a vice-minister under prime minister Srettha Thavisin.

== Career ==
Umesh was editor of the Bangkok Post from July 2016 to May 2018. He was forced to resign by the newspaper's board of directors after he refused to curtail criticism of Thailand's military-led government.

In 2019, Umesh was a party list candidate for the Thai Raksa Chart Party, which was dissolved by the Constitutional Court.
