= Suthawan Sathirathai =

Thai academic (born 1958)

Than Phu Ying Suthawan Sathirathai
- สุธาวัลย์ เสถียรไทย
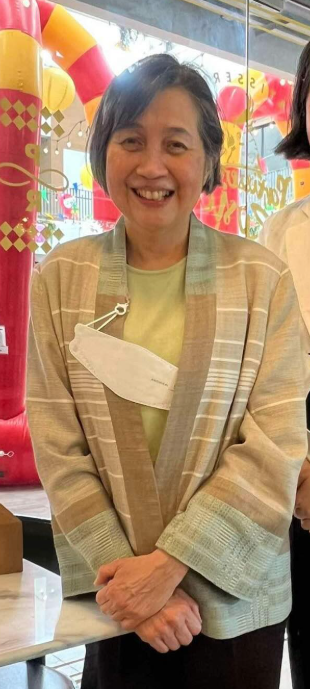
- Born: Suthawan Ladawan na Ayudhaya; 24 September 1958 (age 67); Bangkok, Thailand
- Education: Chulalongkorn University; Tufts University; Cambridge (Ph.D.)
- Occupations: Scholar; university lecturer
- Spouse: Surakiart Sathirathai
- Children: Santithan Sathirathai
- Parents: Thawisan Ladawan (father); Busba Kitiyakara (mother)

Than Phu Ying Suthawan Sathirathai (Thai: สุธาวัลย์ เสถียรไทย; RTGS: Suthawan Sathianthai) is the only daughter of Than Phu Ying Busba Kitiyakara (younger sister of Queen Sirikit), thus first cousin of the current king. She is the wife of Surakiart Sathirathai, former Deputy Prime Minister in charge of foreign affairs under the government of Thaksin Shinawatra. She was a lecturer in environmental economics at Chulalongkorn University.

== Education and early career ==
She began studied at Chulalongkorn University Demonstration School until grade 5 and then moved to Chitralada School. She studied in bachelor's degree at the Department of Electrical Engineering, Faculty of Engineering Chulalongkorn University. After graduating with a master's degree in economics from Tufts University, United States she became an environmental researcher at the Thailand Development Research Institute (TDRI) and was funded by the British Council to study doctoral degree in Land Economy at Cambridge University, England.

She returned to serve as a lecturer at the Faculty of Economics, Chulalongkorn University as deputy director of the Ecology Economics Center and became the head of the education project, she produced research results on environmental impacts in the case of the construction of Kaeng Suea Ten Dam.

At present, she resigned from government service as an independent scholar and established The State Institute for Social and Environmental Development Foundation is an academic NGO aimed at conducting studies and research with an emphasis on public participation to lead to good management and fairness to society and the environment.

== Ancestry ==
Ancestors of Suthawan Sathirathai

16. Ladawan, Prince Bhumindra Bhakdi
8. Prince Phoem Ladawan
17. Sat
4. Bung Ladawan, Phra Phum Phichai
9. Khli
2. Thawisan Ladawan
20. (=22.) Chum Bunnag, Phraya Montri Suriyawong
10. Chae Bunnag, Phraya Kraiphet Rattana Songkhram
21. Pao Bunnag
5. Neung Bunnag
22. (=20.) Chum Bunnag, Phraya Montri Suriyawong
11. Nim Bunnag
23. Klan
1. Suthawan Sathirathai
24. Chulalongkorn
12. Kitiyakara Voralaksana, Prince of Chanthaburi I
25. Uam Bisalayabutra
6. Nakkhatra Mangkala, Prince of Chanthaburi II
26. Devan Udayavongse, Prince Devavongse Varoprakarn
13. Princess Apsarasaman Devakula
27. Yai Sucharitakul
3. Busba Kitiyakara
28. Prince Sai Sanidvongs
14. Sadan Sanidvongs, Chao Phraya Wongsanupraphat
29. Khian Sasisamit
7. Bua Sanidvongs
30. Ruai Bunyathon
15. Bang Snidvongs na Ayudhya, Thao Wanida Phicharini
31. Wae na Bang Xang

== Honours ==
- Dame Grand Cordon (Special Class) of the Most Exalted Order of the White Elephant (2004)
- Dame Grand Cordon (Special Class) of the Most Noble Order of the Crown of Thailand (2003)
- Dame Grand Commander (Second Class, upper grade) of the Most Illustrious Order of Chula Chom Klao (2004)
