= Chantawit Tantasith =

Thai politician

- ฉันทวิชญ์ ตัณฑสิทธิ์

Deputy Minister of Commerce
- In office 30 June 2025 – 19 September 2025
- Prime Minister: Paetongtarn Shinawatra
- Minister: Jatuporn Buruspat

Personal details
- Spouse: Werapong Prapha (m. 2025)
- Parent(s): Takorn Tantasith; Pornpanee Tantasith

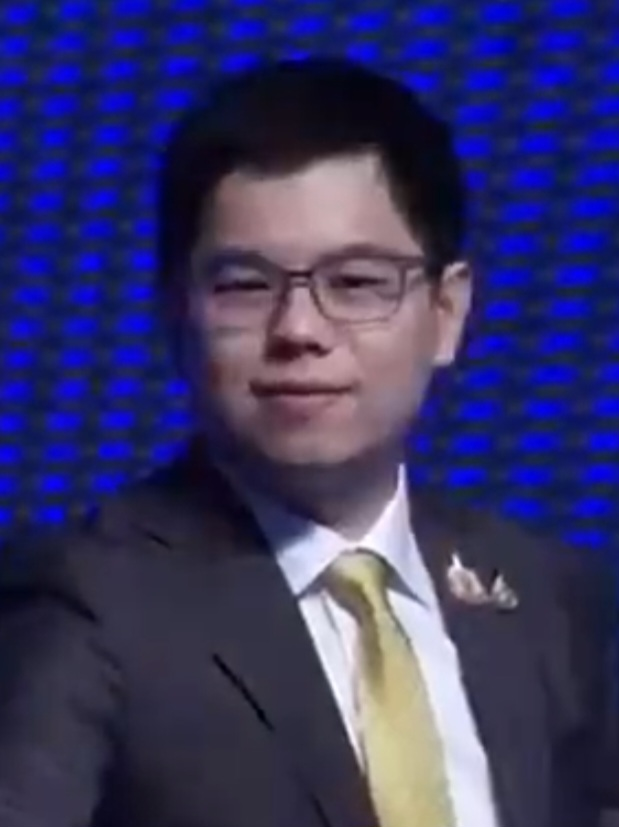
Chantawit at the World Tapioca Conference in 2025

Chantawit Tantasith (Thai: ฉันทวิชญ์ ตัณฑสิทธิ์, RTGS: Chanthawit Tanthasit) is a Thai politician, serving as Deputy Minister of Commerce from June 2025 to September 2025

== Early life and education ==
Chantawit is the son of politician Takorn Tantasith and Pornpanee Tantasith.

== Career ==
=== Ministry of Commerce ===
In July 2025, Chantawit led a delegation from the Ministry to New York City to meet with US businesses in collaboration with the US-ASEAN Business Council and the Business Council for International Understanding.
