= Takorn Tantasith =

- ฐากร ตัณฑสิทธิ์

Former Secretary-General of the National Broadcasting and Telecommunications Commission (NBTC), Thailand
- In office 5 January 2012 – 30 June 2020

Secretary-General of Thai Sang Thai Party
- Incumbent
- Assumed office 31 March 2023
- Preceded by: Sita Tiwaree

Personal details
- Born: 10 September 1960 (age 65) Kalasin, Thailand
- Party: Thai Sang Thai
- Spouse: Pornpanee Tantasith

Takorn Tantasith (Thai: ฐากร ตัณฑสิทธิ์) is the Former Chairman of the Standing Committee on Higher Education, Science, Research and Innovation, The House of Representatives and also Member of the Parliament of Thailand . Previously, he served as the first Secretary-General of the National Broadcasting and Telecommunications Commission (NBTC), Thailand. Being Secretary-General, he holds the highest executive position at the Office of the NBTC, having roles and responsibilities as stipulated by the Act on Organization to Assign Radio Frequency and to Regulate the Broadcasting and Telecommunications Services B.E. 2553 (2010). Takorn was appointed Secretary-General of the NBTC on 5 January 2012, for a five-year term, and in late 2016 was reappointed for a second term starting 5 January 2017. Prior to this, he was Acting Secretary-General of the NBTC, and Secretary-General of the National Telecommunications Commission (NTC)from 2009–2012.

During Takorn's tenure as Secretary-General, the NBTC organized two spectrum auctions in 2015. The first auction for the 1800 MHz spectrum lasted two days and resulted in 80 billion baht in revenue. The second auction, held a month later for the 900 MHz spectrum, lasted four days and generated 150 billion baht. Earlier in 2015, Takorn managed a nationwide campaign to register mobile SIM cards in Thailand, and ordered a temporary suspension of Thai TV's licence following the channel's non-payment of its digital television licence fees.

Following the 2015 auctions and the expansion of 4G mobile services, the NBTC organized auctions in 2018 for the expiring 1800 MHz and 900 MHz spectrum bands which generated a total revenue of 50 billion baht. In 2019, the Office of NBTC held an auction for 700 MHz band. The total revenue earned was 56 billion baht this time. In February 2020, the NBTC released 5G spectrum in the 700 MHz, 1800 MHz, 2600 MHz, and 26 GHz bands.

== Early life and education ==
Takorn was born on 10 September 1960. He graduated with a Bachelor of Laws (Second-Class Honors) from Ramkhamhaeng University, Thailand, in 1982, and a master's degree in Public Administration from Detroit University, United States, in 1986. In 2013, Takorn received an honorary doctorate in Public Administration from Prince of Songkla University, Thailand. He was also awarded a "Technology Person of the Year" in 2015 by Foundation of Science and Technology of Thailand in 2015, an honorary degree for doctor of philosophy by Srinakharinwirot University in 2017, and Human Resource Excellence Award presented by Thammasat University in 2017.

== Personal life ==
Takorn is married to Pornpanee Tantasith, who was a lecturer at Assumption University (ABAC). They have two sons, Chantawit and Kritti, and one daughter, Isaree. Chantawit currently serves as Deputy Minister of Commerce in the Paetongtarn Cabinet.

== Career ==
- 2017–2020: Secretary-General of the NBTC (second term)
- 5 January 2012 to 4 January 2017: Secretary-General of the NBTC
- 20 December 2010 to 4 January 2012: Acting Secretary-General of the NBTC
- 1 December 2009 to 19 December 2010: Acting Secretary-General of the National Telecommunications Commission (NTC)
- 2006-2009: Deputy Secretary-General of the NTC
- 2005-2006: Principal Expert, Office of the NTC
- 2005: Advisor to the Chairman of the State Audit Commission, Office of the Auditor General of Thailand
- 1987-2004: Budget Analyst, Bureau of the Budget

== Royal Decorations & Awards ==
Takorn has received the following royal decorations in the Honours System of Thailand:

- 2013 Knight Grand Cordon (Special Class) of the Most Exalted Order of the White Elephant
- 2010 Knight Grand Cordon (Special Class) of the Most Noble Order of the Crown of Thailand
- 2003 Knight Commander (Second Class) of the Most Exalted Order of the White Elephant
- 1999 Knight Commander (Second Class) of the Most Noble Order of the Crown of Thailand

Takorn has received the following awards.

- 2017 Honorary Degree for a Doctor of Philosophy by Srinakharinwirot University
- 2017 Human Resource Excellence Award presented by Thammasat University
- 2015 Quality Person of the Year Award in the Technology category by the Foundation of Science and Technology Council of Thailand.
