= Chalermchai Sri-on =

Thai politician (born 1965)

- เฉลิมชัย ศรีอ่อน
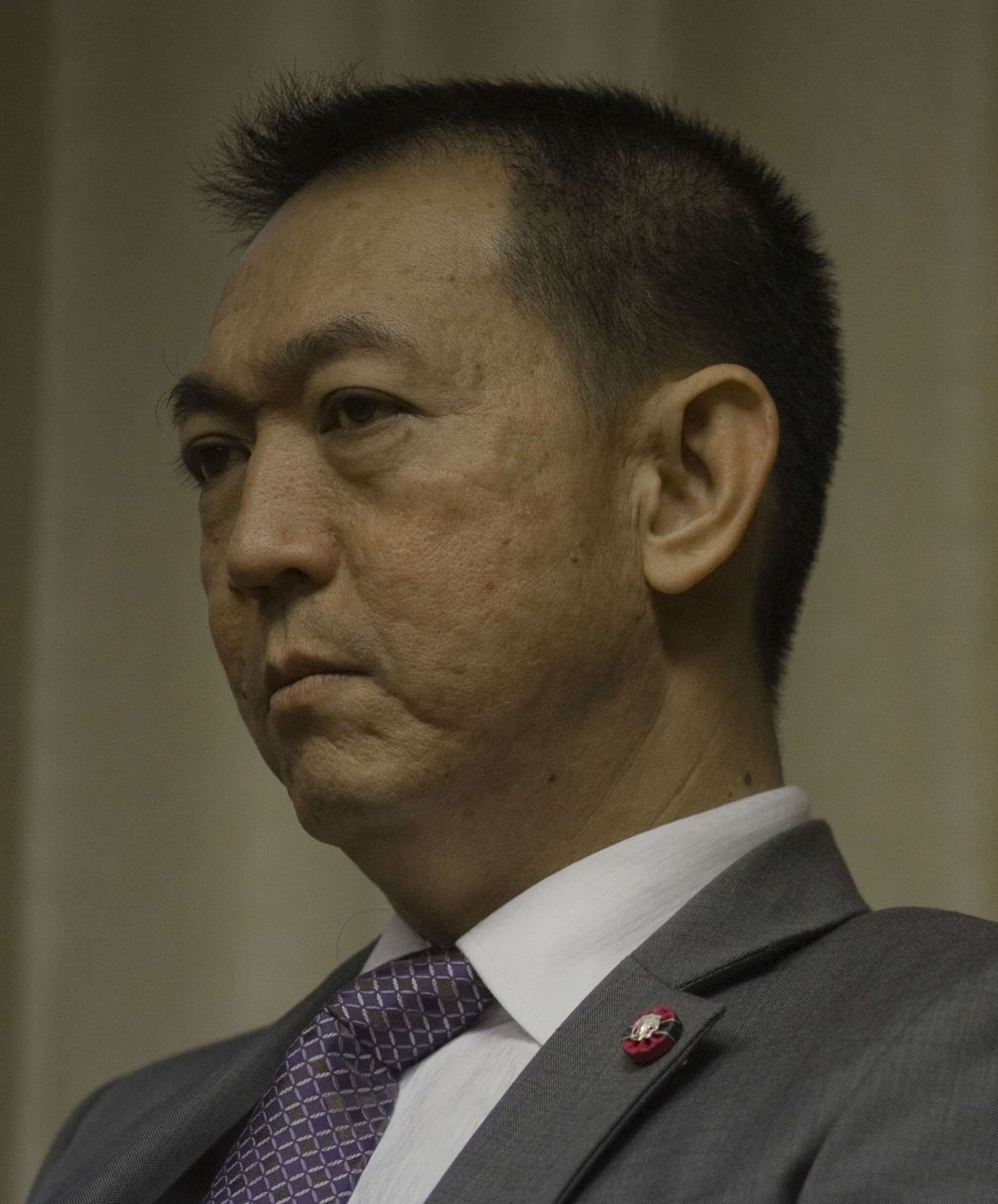

Minister of Natural Resources and Environment
- In office 3 September 2024 – 19 September 2025
- Prime Minister: Paetongtarn Shinawatra; Suriya Juangroongruangkit (acting); Phumtham Wechayachai (acting)
- Preceded by: Patcharawat Wongsuwan
- Succeeded by: Suchart Chomklin

Leader of the Democrat Party
- In office 14 November 2023 – 12 September 2025; Acting until 9 December 2023
- Preceded by: Jurin Laksanawisit
- Succeeded by: Pramual Pongthavaradet (acting); Abhisit Vejjajiva

Minister of Agriculture and Cooperatives
- In office 10 July 2019 – 1 September 2023
- Prime Minister: Prayut Chan-o-cha
- Preceded by: Krisada Boonyarat
- Succeeded by: Thamanat Prompow

Minister of Labour
- In office 8 June 2010 – 9 August 2011
- Prime Minister: Abhisit Vejjajiva
- Preceded by: Paitoon Kaewtong
- Succeeded by: Padermchai Sasomsap

Personal details
- Born: 7 March 1965 (age 61) Pran Buri, Thailand
- Party: Democrat (-2025); Kla Tham Party (2025-)
- Spouse: Thanyavee Sri-on
- Education: Ramkhamhaeng University
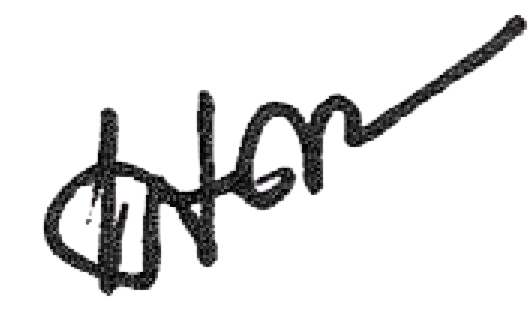
- Signature

Chalermchai Sri-on (Thai: เฉลิมชัย ศรีอ่อน; RTGS: Chaloemchai Si-on) is a Thai politician who is former leader of the Democrat Party. He previously served as Minister of Agriculture and Cooperatives in the second cabinet of Prime Minister Prayut Chan-o-cha.

== Early life and education ==
Chalermchai Sri-on was born on 7 March 1965 in Pran Buri District, Prachuap Khiri Khan Province. His father was an overseas Chinese who has wives in both China and Thailand. He graduated high school from Phrommanuson School, Phetchaburi Province. Undergraduate from Faculty of Law, Ramkhamhaeng University and master's degree in Art (Policy and Planning) from Krirk University.

== Political careers ==
Chalermchai started his political careers as a member of the Prachuap Khiri Khan Provincial Council in 1990 - 2000 and as the Chairman of the Prachuap Khiri Khan Provincial Council in 1995 to 1997 and was the first member of the Prachuap Khiri Khan Provincial House of Representatives in 2001 election and subsequent elections in 2005, 2007 and 2011. Chalermchai is the Deputy Leader of the Democrat Party responsible of the central region. Subsequently, in the Cabinet reshuffle of the government of Abhisit Vejjajiva on 6 June 2010, he was appointed Minister of Labour.

In the government of Prayut Chan-o-cha, he was appointed Minister of Agriculture and Cooperatives.

On December 9, 2023, he was elected with 88.5% of the votes as the leader of the Democrat Party, considered the ninth Democrats leader.

He has been facing resistance from the public during his reign of the Democrat Party. To counter this, he has called for changes within the party to win back the previous dominance this party had back in its golden era of Chuan Leekpai.

He resigned as leader of the Democrat Party on September 12, 2025, citing health reasons.

== Royal decorations ==
Chalermchai has received the following royal decorations in the Honours System of Thailand:

- 2010 - Knight Grand Cordon (Special Class) of the Most Exalted Order of the White Elephant
- 2008 - Knight Grand Cordon (Special Class) of The Most Noble Order of the Crown of Thailand

Political offices
Preceded by Krisada Boonyarat	Minister of Agriculture and Cooperatives; 2019–2023	Succeeded by Thamanat Prompow
