= Werapong Prapha =

Thai businessman and politician

- วีระพงษ์ ประภา

Thai Trade Representative
- Incumbent
- Assumed office 5 November 2024 - 19 September 2025
- Prime Minister: Paetongtarn Shinawatra

Personal details
- Born: 30 September 1984 (age 41)
- Party: Democrat
- Spouse: Chantawit Tantasith (m. 2025)
- Education: University of Cambridge (MBA) London School of Economics (MSc) Victoria University of Wellington (BCom)
- Nickname: Art

Werapong Prapha (Thai: วีระพงษ์ ประภา) is a Thai politician, currently serving as Thai Trade Representative. He previously worked as an executive of international organizations on sustainability and trade policy in the global supply chains.

== Early life and education ==
Werapong was born on 30 September 1984 in Hat Yai district, Songkhla, Thailand. He is the son of Kamphol and Wathinee Prapha, both established Thai businesspeople.

Werapong began his education in Thailand before moving to New Zealand, where he completed high school at Burnside High School in Christchurch. He earned a Bachelor’s degree with First Class Honours in Accounting, International Business, and Commercial Law from Victoria University of Wellington. He later pursued a Master’s in International Development from the London School of Economics and Political Science in the United Kingdom.

In May 2024, Werapong completed an Executive MBA at the University of Cambridge. He received a scholarship based on his track record in the civil society.

== Career ==
Werapong began his career as an accountant and financial consultant with Ernst &Young in New Zealand, United Kingdom and Ireland, advising multinational companies in the agricultural and financial sectors.

Werapong later pivoted his career into the civil society sector. He worked as a consultant for the United Nations Development Program (UNDP) and as a Public Communications Manager for the Thailand Development Research Institute (TDRI).

From 2014 to 2022, Werapong served as a Senior Policy Advisor for Oxfam in Thailand and later in Boston, Massachusetts. He engaged large US multinational corporations, such as Amazon, Walmart, and Kroger, to adopt sustainability practices as part of their core strategies. Werapong also authored numerous policy papers and blogs and led cross-sector negotiations between government, private sector, and civil society to foster sustainable business practices.

Between 2022 and 2024, Werapong worked as a Senior Program Manager at the Freedom Fund, a social-mission philanthropy based in London. He oversaw over 40 projects on sustainability, human rights, and environmental protection across Europe, the Americas, and Southeast Asia. His work was documented in Moody’s Infinite Game (2024).

On 5 November 2024, Prime Minister Paetongtarn Shinawatra appointed Werapong as Thai Trade Representative.
