= Narumon Pinyosinwat =

Thai politician (born 1973)

- นฤมล ภิญโญสินวัฒน์
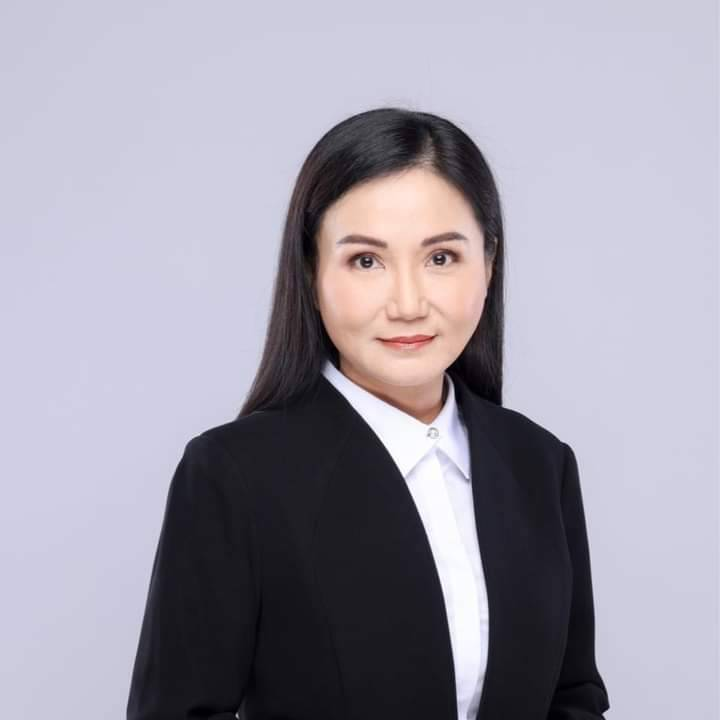
- Official portrait, 2023

Minister of Education
- In office 30 June 2025 – 30 March 2026
- Prime Minister: Paetongtarn Shinawatra; Suriya Juangroongruangkit (acting); Phumtham Wechayachai (acting); Anutin Charnvirakul
- Preceded by: Permpoon Chidchob
- Succeeded by: Prasert Jantararuangtong

Minister of Agriculture and Cooperatives
- In office 3 September 2024 – 30 June 2025
- Prime Minister: Paetongtarn Shinawatra
- Preceded by: Thamanat Prompow
- Succeeded by: Atthakorn Sirilatthayakorn

Thailand Trade Representative
- In office 3 October 2023 – 2 September 2024
- Prime Minister: Srettha Thavisin
- Preceded by: Chayotid Kridakon
- Succeeded by: Chayotid Kridakon

Deputy Minister of Labour
- In office 5 August 2020 – 8 September 2021
- Prime Minister: Prayut Chan-o-cha
- Minister: Suchart Chomklin
- Preceded by: Ladawan Wongsriwong

Government spokesperson
- In office 30 July 2019 – 29 July 2020
- Prime Minister: Prayut Chan-o-cha
- Preceded by: Puttipong Punnakanta
- Succeeded by: Anucha Burapachaisri

Personal details
- Born: Narumon Sa-adchom; 29 October 1973 (age 52) Khlong Toei, Bangkok, Thailand
- Party: Kla Tham (2023–present)
- Other political affiliations: Palang Pracharath (2018–2023)
- Spouse: Jumpol Pinyosinwat (m. 2018)
- Children: 2
- Education: Chulalongkorn University (BS); Georgia State University (MS); University of Pennsylvania (PhD)

Narumon Pinyosinwat (Thai: นฤมล ภิญโญสินวัฒน์, RTGS: Naruemon Phinyosinwat; born 29 October 1973) is a Thai politician who served as the Minister of Education in the cabinets of Paetongtarn Shinawatra and Anutin Charnvirakul. She previously served as the Thai Trade Representative and as the Deputy Minister of Labour in the second cabinet of Prime Minister Prayut Chan-o-cha. She previously served as government spokesperson.

== Early life and education ==
Narumon was born on 29 October 1973 in Bangkok's Khlong Toei. She graduated with a Bachelor of Science in Statistics (Applied Mathematics) from Faculty of Commerce and Accountancy, Chulalongkorn University before continuing to study until completing a master's degree Master of Science (Applied Mathematics) at Georgia State University. Then she graduated with a Master of Business Administration (Applied Economics) and a Doctor of Philosophy (Finance) from the Wharton School of the University of Pennsylvania, USA.

== Careers ==
She was previously a lecturer and professor at the NIDA business school, National Institute of Development Administration. She was previously an advisor to Minister of Labour, General Sirichai Distakul. After General Sirichai resigned from a minister position, she was appointed the Vice Minister of Finance by Mr.Apisak Tantivorawong.

== Political careers ==
Naruamon joined the Palang Pracharat Party to run for the party's fifth party list of members of the House of Representatives and get elected later, after resigning to serve as a spokesman for the Prime Minister's Office in the Government of Prayut Chan-o-cha.

On 9 September 2021, Narumon was sacked from cabinet due to the Royal Gazette published a royal command removing them both from their portfolios and the cabinet after he was earlier accused of being behind a move to oust Prime Minister Prayut during last week's censure debate in parliament.

On 28 September 2023, She resigned from Palang Pracharath Party and was appointed as the Thailand Trade Representative on 3 October.

On 6 August 2024, Narumon was elected as the leader of the Kla Tham Party, succeeding Chawengsak Jaikam.

On 3 September 2024, Narumon was appointed as Minister of Agriculture and Cooperatives, succeeding Captain Thamanat Prompow in the administration of Paetongtarn Shinawatra.

== Royal decorations ==
Narumon her received the following royal decorations in the Honours System of Thailand:

- 2021 - Knight Grand Cordon of The Most Noble Order of the Crown of Thailand
- 2017 - Knight Grand Cross of the Most Exalted Order of the White Elephant
