= Tom Wright (journalist) =

American journalist

Tom Wright is a British journalist known for his investigative work, known for his The Wall Street Journal reporting on the 1Malaysia Development Berhad (1MDB) scandal.

== Career ==
Wright served as The Wall Street Journal's Asia Economics Editor from 2013 to 2019.

=== 1MDB ===
Wright and Bradley Hope jointed covered the 1MDB scandal, later writing Billion Dollar Whale: The Man Who Fooled Wall Street, Hollywood, and the World about fugitive Jho Low. Wright has continued to report on Jho Low's whereabouts.

=== Project Brazen ===
In 2021, Wright and Bradley Hope launched Project Brazen, a multimedia journalism platform focused on international stories, including crime and business.

In September 2025, Wright published a Project Brazen investigation on a financial network tied to scam centers in Southeast Asia led by South African Benjamin Mauerberger. The investigation alleged Thailand's Deputy Finance Minister Vorapak Tanyawong was tasked with investigating the network, which paid his wife, Kanokporn Tanyawong, $3 million. On 22 October 2025, Vorapak resigned from his position.

== Publications ==
- Billion Dollar Whale: The Man Who Fooled Wall Street, Hollywood, and the World (2018)
- Fat Leonard: The Man Who Corrupted the US Navy (2024)
