= Krisada Boonyarat =

Thai politician (born 1957)

Krisada Boonyarat (Thai: กฤษฎา บุญราช, RTGS: Kritsada Bunyarat; born 5 July 1957) is a former Thai civil servant who served as Permanent Secretary of the Ministry of Interior, and was the Minister of Agriculture and Cooperatives in the first cabinet of Prime Minister Prayut Chan-o-cha. Chalermchai Sri-on was appointed as his successor.
