= Billion Dollar Whale =

2018 book by Tom Wright and Bradley Hope

- First edition
- Author: Tom Wright, Bradley Hope
- Language: English
- Genre: Non-fiction
- Publisher: Hachette Books
- Publication date: September 18, 2018
- Publication place: United States
- Media type: Print (Hardcover and Paperback)
- Pages: 400
- ISBN: 978-0-316-43650-2

Billion Dollar Whale (original title: Billion Dollar Whale: The Man Who Fooled Wall Street, Hollywood, and the World) is a non-fiction book by The Wall Street Journal correspondents Tom Wright and Bradley Hope. Published on September 18, 2018, by Hachette Books, the book focuses on how Malaysian financier Jho Low allegedly masterminded a US$4.5 billion fraud in what is referred to as the 1Malaysia Development Berhad scandal.

The book received positive reviews despite attempts to block it from distribution in multiple countries in a campaign by London-based law firm Schillings.

== Overview ==
Billion Dollar Whale is a book based on extensive investigative reporting by Wall Street Journal correspondents Tom Wright and Bradley Hope. Their reporting made them finalists for the 2016 Pulitzer Prize.

Billion Dollar Whale chronicles the exploits of Malaysian fugitive businessman Jho Low, wanted by authorities internationally for his connection with the 1Malaysia Development Berhad scandal. It describes how Low manipulated former Malaysian Prime Minister Najib Razak into creating a sovereign wealth fund that raised ten billion dollars, and how half of the raised funds eventually disappeared. The book sheds light on the lax oversight that allowed Low to siphon out such large amounts of money to finance his lavish lifestyle. It also details his time in the United States and his relationships with Gulf Arab royalty and Hollywood actors, among others.

Low is the “whale” referred to in the book's title. The term refers to a high roller, which is a gambler who consistently wagers large amounts of money.

== Reception ==
Overall, Billion Dollar Whale was well received. Upon release, the book was quickly sold out in certain Malaysian book chains. In a Financial Times review, the book is described as perfect material for a Hollywood script. It was longlisted for the Financial Times and McKinsey Business Book of the Year Award in 2018. Billion Dollar Whale has been listed as a New York Times bestseller.

A review by The Star Tribune noted that the details presented in the book "can be a slog but give the book authority".

By November 2021, the book had sold over 500,000 copies internationally, and remained a bestseller in Asia.

Low, while hiding as a fugitive in China to avoid being arrested, released a statement on his website dismissing the events reported on in the book:

[T]his book is written with allegations disguised as fact and gossip passed off as legitimate reporting. The narrative is framed to allow the authors to write about celebrities, and models and parties, without ever proving any of the allegations… Billion Dollar Whale is guilt-by-lifestyle, and trial-by-media at its worst.

== Release ==
After the book's release in the United States, London-based law firm Schillings, who represented Low in the 1MDB case, started working to halt its publication and distribution. The tactics used to disrupt distribution to British and Australian booksellers included threatening letters and legal missives. Some book vendors were warned about putting the book into the "True Crime" section of bookstores. The campaign against the publication of the book was unsuccessful and bookstores began selling copies on 12 September 2019.

== Adaptation ==
Sidney Kimmel Entertainment obtained the film rights to Billion Dollar Whale. A television adaptation is in the works, produced by Beau Willimon and Jordan Tappis, with David Henry Hwang as screenwriter and executive producer. Michelle Yeoh will also serve as a producer.

== See also ==
- Najib Razak controversies
