= Vorapak Tanyawong =

Thai politician

- วรภัค ธันยาวงษ์
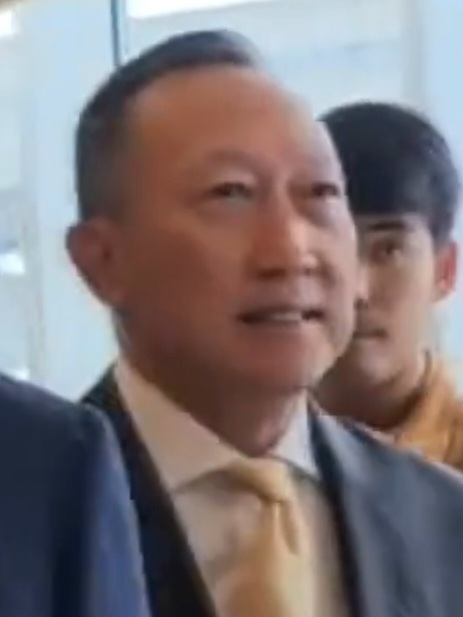

Deputy Minister of Finance
- In office 19 September 2025 – 22 October 2025
- Prime Minister: Anutin Charnvirakul
- Minister: Ekniti Nitithanprapas

Personal details
- Spouse: Kanokporn Tanyawong
- Relations: Kant Tanyawong (son)

Vorapak Tanyawong (Thai: วรภัค ธันยาวงษ์, RTGS: Woraphak Thanyawong) is a Thai politician who served as Deputy Minister of Finance in 2025.

== Career ==
Vorapak previously served as an executive at Krungthai Bank, before joining the Anutin Charnvirakul Cabinet in September 2025. According to Whale Hunting, Vorapak was previously listed as an adviser to Cambodian bank BIC group, which allegedly has ties to a money laundering network.

=== Cybercrime hub investigation ===
In late September 2025, the Whale Hunting newsletter written by journalist Tom Wright published that that Vorapak and his wife, Kanokporn Tanyawong, were connected to a cybercrime hub network in Cambodia. The newsletter made allegations that Kanokporn had been paid $3 million in cryptocurrency to a Chinese-Cambodian criminal network led by South African fixer Benjamin Mauerberger that Vorapak was previously tasked with investigation as a member of a government committee. The $3 million was cited from signed corporate filings in Singapore.

On 21 October 2025, Prime Minister of Thailand Anutin Charnvirakul requested Vorapak provide a written response to allegations, while also denying reports that Vorapak had been named to lead Thailand's new anti-scam committee.

Vorapak resigned on 22 October 2025. He denied the allegations, and stated that he planned to file a defamation lawsuit. Later on 22 October 2025, Anutin stated he would not fill the vacancy created by Vorapak's resignation.

Following his resignation, opposition lawmakers called for an investigation into Vorapak's activities.

On 25 March 2026, Whale Hunting published an article focused on Vorapak's son Kant, who has posted photos of himself on social media traveling on Mauerberger's Gulfstream and vacationing on his superyacht.
