= Kantathi Suphamongkhon =

Thai foreign minister (born 1952)

- กันตธีร์ ศุภมงคล
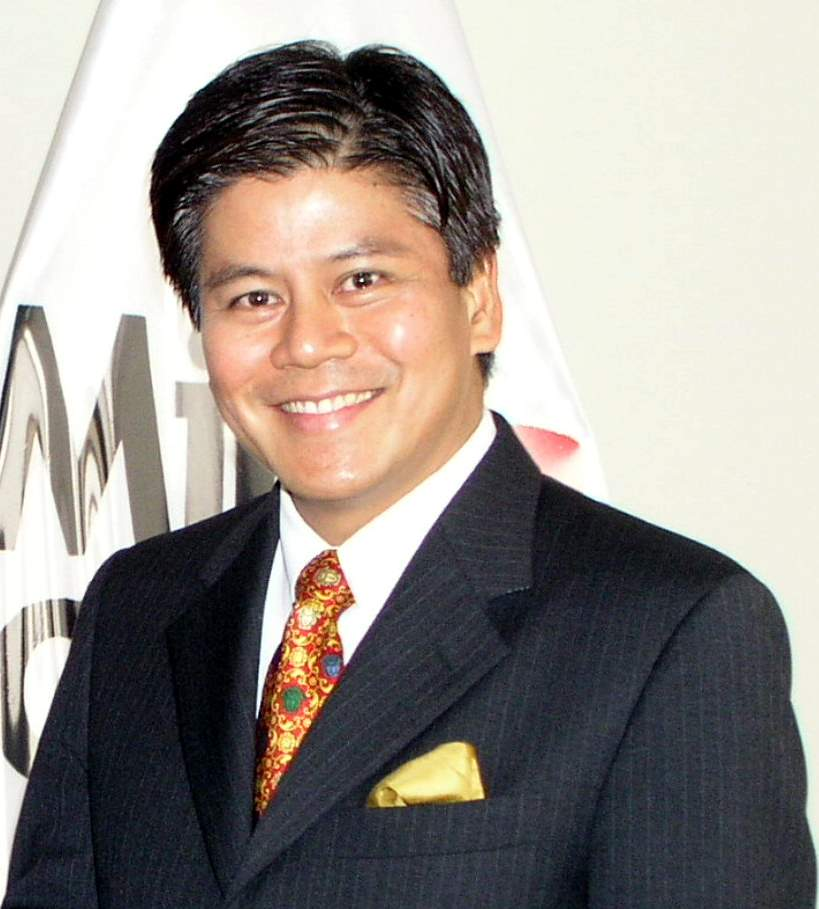
- Kantathi Suphamongkhon in 2008

Minister of Foreign Affairs
- In office 11 March 2005 – 19 September 2006
- Prime Minister: Thaksin Shinawatra
- Preceded by: Surakiart Sathirathai
- Succeeded by: Nitya Pibulsonggram

Thai Trade Representative
- In office March 2001 – March 2005

Member of Parliament
- In office 2001–2005

Director of Policy and Planning, Ministry of Foreign Affairs
- In office 1992–1994

Representative of Thailand at the United Nations, New York
- In office 1987–1991

Personal details
- Born: April 3, 1952 (age 74) Bangkok, Thailand
- Party: Thai Rak Thai Party
- Spouse: Soparvan Suphamongkhon
- Children: Renee Dootsdi Suphamongkhon
- Parents: Ambassador Konthi Suphamongkhon (father); Khunying Dootsdi Suphamongkhon (mother)
- Education: USC, PhD; American University, MA; UCLA, BA
- Profession: Professor; diplomat; politician; business executive

Kantathi Suphamongkhon (Thai กันตธีร์ ศุภมงคล, born 3 April 1952) is a Thai diplomat, politician, university professor and a real estate developer. He served as the 39th minister of foreign affairs of Thailand from 11 March 2005 until the military coup d'état on 19 September 2006. In that capacity, he also served as chairman of the Human Security Network, established in 1999 as an association of countries working to promote the concept of human security as a feature of national and international public policy.

While foreign minister, Kantathi enhanced Thailand's diplomatic role in the Association of Southeast Asian Nations (ASEAN), and in the world at large. He advanced Thailand's constructive role in global affairs. Among other things, while in Pyongyang on several occasions, Kantathi encouraged the Democratic People's Republic of Korea (DPRK) or North Korea to enter or resume the Six-Party Talks. He had been to the DPRK several times and has worked closely with the then U.S. Secretary of State Condoleezza Rice, the People's Republic of China's Foreign Minister Li Zhaoxing, and the Republic of Korea's Foreign Minister Ban Ki-moon, with the goal of maintaining peace and security on the Korean Peninsula.

Kantathi has been appointed University of California Regents' Professor at the University of California, Los Angeles (UCLA) as well as senior fellow at the Burkle Center for International Relations at UCLA. As distinguished professor of law and diplomacy, he taught law, diplomacy and international trade at UCLA from 2007 until 2014 in various departments and schools, namely department of political science, International Institute and Anderson School of Management. Kantathi is presently a member of the advisory board of the RAND Corporation Center for Asia Pacific Policy.

== Career ==
From 11 March 2005 - 19 September 2006, Kantathi was Minister of Foreign Affairs of the Kingdom of Thailand. From 2001 - 2005 Kantathi was Thai Trade Representative, a position with cabinet rank.

Kantathi was executive director and one of the founding members of the Thai Rak Thai Party, as well as a former spokesperson for the party.

Kantathi also served as special adviser to Her Royal Highness Princess Chulabhorn Walailak of Thailand. In this role, he accompanied Her Royal Highness on trips to numerous countries pertaining to medical research, the environment, and various other international activities. Kantathi was also foreign affairs adviser to several prime ministers of Thailand as well as foreign affairs advisor to the Speaker of the House of Representatives of Thailand.

Kantathi was elected member of the Thai Parliament for two terms (1995 and again 2001). Prior to entering politics, he was a career diplomat in Thailand's Ministry of Foreign Affairs for 10 years (1985–1995), four of which were spent as a representative of Thailand to the United Nations in New York (1987–1992). His diplomatic career began in the ministry's International Organizations Department where he focused on the United Nations when Thailand was serving its two years as a member of the United Nations Security Council. Later, Kantathi worked in the Political Affairs Department. In 1992, he was Adviser on Foreign Affairs to the Speaker of the House Representatives in the Thai Parliament. Kantathi was also director of the Policy and Planning Division in the Ministry of Foreign Affairs during 1993–1994.

Kantathi has worked in the private sector as Director of the Post Publishing Public Company, which publishes the Bangkok Post and Post Today newspapers. He is currently Chairman of Kanta Enterprise International Limited (KEI), a company which focuses on international real estate development.

Kantathi has taught various subjects including international law, international relations, international trade and foreign policy, negotiations and foreign policy, international politics and globalization, foreign policy of Thailand, Southeast Asian studies, and psychology.

== Education ==
Kantathi holds a Ph.D. in international relations from the University of Southern California, an MA in international studies from American University in Washington, D.C., a BA in political science from the University of California at Los Angeles. He graduated High School from General H.H. Arnold High School in Wiesbaden, Germany. He also attended the American High School on the Rhine in Bonn, Germany. Both were U.S. Department of Defense high schools.

== Memberships and affiliations ==
- Member of advisory board, RAND Corporation Center on Asia Pacific Policy
- Pacific Council on International Policy
- Los Angeles World Affairs Council
- Senior fellow, Burkle Center for International Relations
- Advisory Committee on Protection of the Sea (ACOPS)
- American Society of International Law
- Asia Society (International Council Member)

== Awards and decorations ==
- Thai Royal decoration: Knight Grand Cordon of the Most Exalted Order of the White Elephant
- El Sol del Peru: conferred on behalf of the President of Peru in October 2005

== Speeches ==
- Harberger Lecture with Regents Professor and Burkle Senior Fellow Dr. Suphamongkhon May 19, 2008 "
- Burkle Senior Fellow Dr. Suphamongkhon's Letter to the Next US President May 8, 2008 ""
- Thailand: What is Going On?: An Informal Discussion on the Current Situation in Thailand, Apr 22, 2009" ""

== Publications ==
- The Temple of Preah Vihear: An Insider's Recollection, Issue 7, April–May 2011" ""
- Stop Thailand's Free Fall Into the Abyss Now, May 17, 2010" ""
- Can Thailand Avoid the Abyss?, Apr 21, 2009" ""
- International community coming to realize 'the responsibility to protect', Apr 15, 2009" ""
- "Dear Mr. President", Bangkok Post, November 2, 2008
- What the World Expects from the next US President", BBC World News Service, September 9, 2008 ""
- Globalization: Can Poor Nations Catch Up? UCLA Today Online, May 27, 2008" ""
- International Institute Commencement Address: 14 Points for Success June 17, 2008""
- An Icelandic Dinner with Bobby Fisher January 2, 2007 ""

== Audio links ==
- Thai TV Program on Air 23 Mar 2011 part I on YouTube
- Thai TV Program on Air 23 Mar 2011 part II on YouTube
- Audio Clips Free Speech Radio News 90.7 FM interview: Thaipoliticalcrisis.
- Audio clips from Jamaica Radio
