= Ekniti Nitithanprapas =

Thai politician (born 1971)

- เอกนิติ นิติทัณฑ์ประภาศ
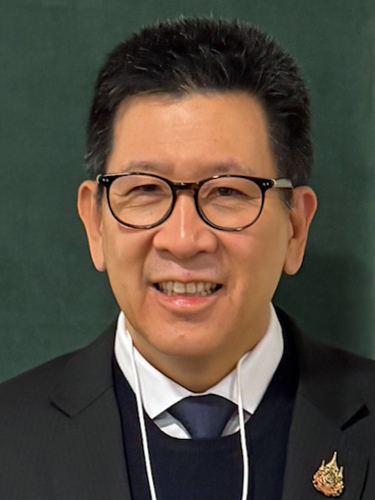
- Ekniti in 2026

Deputy Prime Minister of Thailand
- Incumbent
- Assumed office 19 September 2025
- Prime Minister: Anutin Charnvirakul

Minister of Finance
- Incumbent
- Assumed office 19 September 2025
- Prime Minister: Anutin Charnvirakul
- Preceded by: Pichai Chunhavajira

Personal details
- Born: 17 September 1971 (age 55)
- Party: Bhumjaithai
- Spouse: Roikaeo Nitithanprapas
- Education: University of Illinois at Urbana-Champaign; Thammasat University

Ekniti Nitithanprapas (Thai: เอกนิติ นิติทัณฑ์ประภาศ, RTGS: Ekniti Nitithanpraphat; born 17 September 1971) is a Thai politician, serving as Minister of Finance and Deputy Prime Minister since 2025.

== Career ==
=== Overseas ===
Ekniti possesses extensive international professional experience. He served as a Senior Advisor to the Executive Director at the World Bank in Washington, D.C., from 2006 to 2009, representing the South East Asia Constituency.

Following his tenure at the World Bank, he was appointed as Minister (Economic and Financial) at the Royal Thai Embassy in London, covering the United Kingdom and Europe. In this capacity, he acted as a key representative for the Thai Ministry of Finance in coordinating regional economic policies and monitoring the European economic landscape.

In June 2020, Ekniti was appointed as a Member of the Governing Board of Tax Inspectors Without Borders (TIWB), a joint initiative of the Organisation for Economic Co-operation and Development (OECD) and the United Nations Development Programme (UNDP). He was the first Asian to hold a position on the board.

As a member of the Governing Board, he contributed to setting strategic directions for tax audit capacity building in developing countries and promoting international tax transparency and fairness.

=== Private sector ===
Ekniti has served as chairman and as a board member (including at subcommittee level) of Thai state enterprises and private-sector companies, most of them public companies listed on the Stock Exchange of Thailand. These included serving as chairman of Krung Thai Bank, Thai Airways International, and the National Credit Bureau, as well as chairman of the Executive Board of Directors of the Export–Import Bank of Thailand. He also served as a director of Siam Commercial Bank.

=== Public service ===
Prior to his appointment as Minister of Finance in the Anutin cabinet, Ekniti served as director-general of Thailand's Treasury Department.

In September 2025, he resigned as chairman of TMBThanachart Bank, effective 16 September 2025. He also resigned from PTT Exploration and Production PCL as a director and chair of its Corporate Governance and Sustainability Committee, effective the same date.

=== Minister of Finance ===
After taking office, Ekniti was tasked with forming a special team to investigate suspicious financial flows linked to online scams and related crimes.

Deputy Minister of Finance Vorapak Tanyawong subsequently resigned on 22 October 2025 following allegations linking him and his wife to a transnational scam operation.

=== Royal decorations ===
Ekniti has received the following royal decorations in the Honours System of Thailand:

- 2025 – Knight Grand Cordon of the Most Exalted Order of the White Elephant
- 2020 – Knight Grand Cordon of The Most Noble Order of the Crown of Thailand
- 2020 - Chakrabarti Mala Medal – Medal for Long Service and Good Conduct (Civil)
