= Thammanat Prompao =

Thai politician (born 1965)

- ธรรมนัส พรหมเผ่า
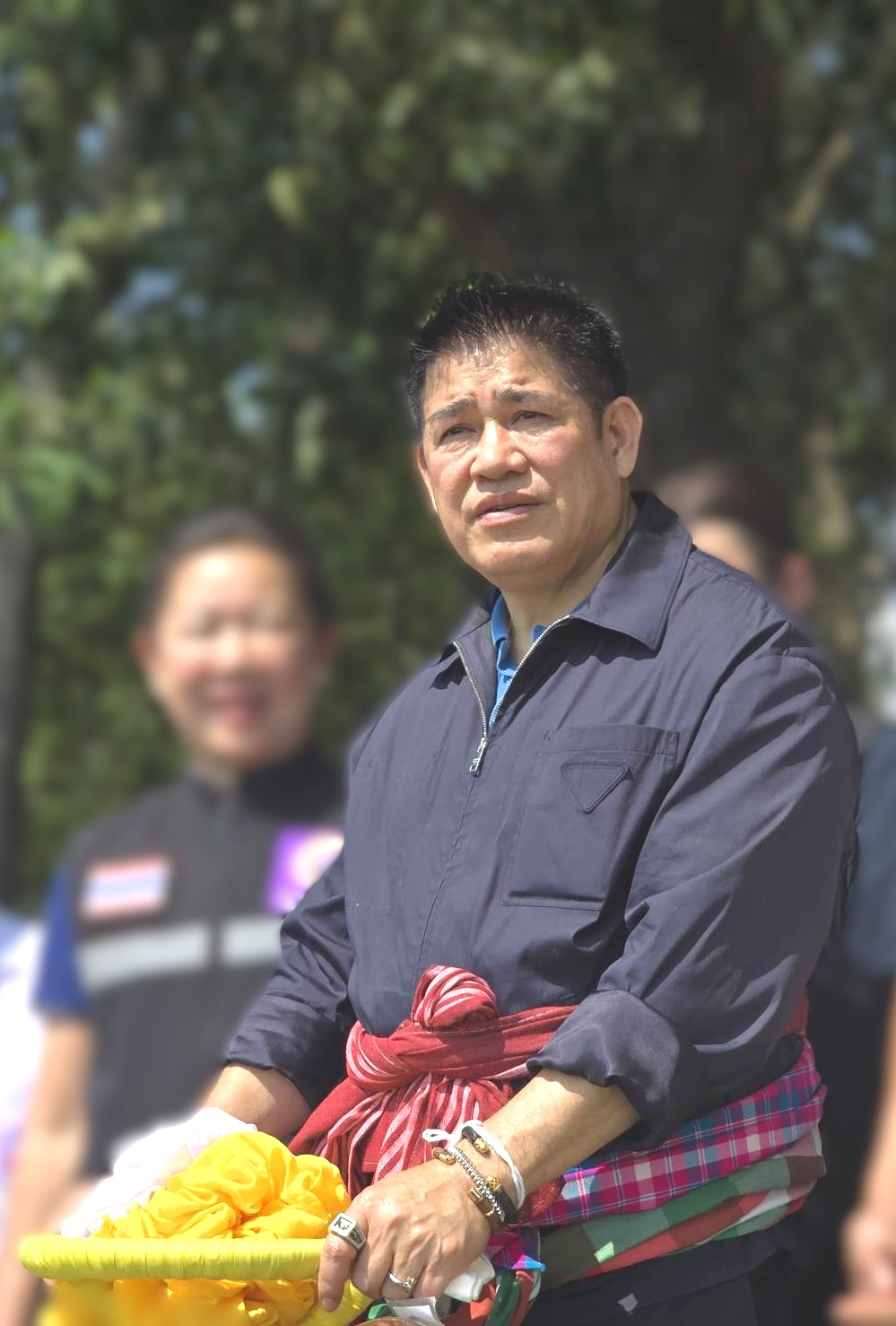
- Thammanat in Chiang Rai in 2025

Deputy Prime Minister of Thailand
- In office 19 September 2025 – 30 March 2026
- Prime Minister: Anutin Charnvirakul

Minister of Agriculture and Cooperatives
- In office 19 September 2025 – 30 March 2026
- Prime Minister: Anutin Charnvirakul
- Preceded by: Atthakorn Sirilatthayakorn
- Succeeded by: Suriya Juangroongruangkit
- In office 1 September 2023 – 3 September 2024
- Prime Minister: Srettha Thavisin
- Preceded by: Chalermchai Sri-on
- Succeeded by: Narumon Pinyosinwat

Deputy Minister of Agriculture and Cooperatives
- In office 10 July 2019 – 8 September 2021
- Prime Minister: Prayut Chan-o-cha
- Minister: Chalermchai Sri-on

Leader of the Kla Tham Party
- Incumbent
- Assumed office 28 April 2026
- Preceded by: Narumon Pinyosinwat

Leader of the Thai Economic Party
- In office 10 June 2022 – 8 October 2022
- Preceded by: Vich Thephasadin Na Ayutthaya
- Succeeded by: Chawengsak Jaikam

Member of the House of Representatives
- Incumbent
- Assumed office 8 February 2026
- Constituency: Party-list
- In office 24 March 2019 – 12 December 2025
- Preceded by: Arunee Chamnanya
- Constituency: Phayao 1st District

Personal details
- Born: 18 August 1965 (age 61) Phayao, Thailand
- Party: Kla Tham (2022–2023; 2024–present)
- Other political affiliations: Thai Rak Thai (1999–2007); Pheu Thai (2008–2018); Palang Pracharath (2018–2022; 2023–2024)
- Spouse: Arisara Prompow
- Domestic partner: Thanaporn Sriviraj
- Children: 7
- Education: Calamus International University; California University FCE
- Profession: Politician

Military service
- Allegiance: Thailand
- Branch/service: Royal Thai Army
- Years of service: 1989 - 1999
- Rank: Captain

Thammanat Prompao (RTGS: Thamanat Phromphao; born 18 August 1965), (Note: Former legally changed names as follows: Yutthaphum Bowphrom, Phatchara Bowphrom, Phatchara Prompow, Manas Prompow and Thammanatw Prompow (ธรรมนัสว์)) is a Thai politician who previously served as the Deputy Prime Minister of Thailand as part of the First Anutin cabinet (2025-26) and as Minister for Agriculture and Cooperatives from 1 September 2023 to 3 September 2024. He formerly served as the Deputy Minister of the Agriculture and Cooperatives Ministry of Thailand under Second Prayut cabinet until 2021. He also served as chairman of the National Water Resources Committee (NWRC). He has long served as a political "fixer" for the military junta that assumed power in the 2014 Thai coup d'état. Thammanat has described himself as "the main artery" in Prime Minister Prayut Chan-o-cha's 17-party government coalition which Thammanat helped forge in the 2019 Thai general election.

== Education ==
Thammanat holds a bachelor's degree from Chulachomklao Royal Military Academy, a master's degree in Buddhism from Mahachulalongkornrajavidyalaya University and a master's in political science from Ramkhamhaeng University. He has a PhD in public administration from Calamus International University and California University FCE (CUFCE). His dissertation, The forms of the local performance development and promotion with image and identity in order to increase the value-added and value-creation: a case study of Phayao Province was "posted" in the European Journal according to Thammanat. Some have suggested that the doctoral degree might be bogus. Deputy Prime Minister Wissanu Krea-ngam says it does not matter if the doctoral degree is fake as it is irrelevant. Thammanat has vowed to file around 100 lawsuits against those who he believes have lied about his past.

== Heroin smuggling ==
Thammanat Prompao was convicted of conspiring to import heroin to Australia. The ruling was handed down on 31 March 1994 when he was sentenced to six years imprisonment. He served four years, then was deported upon his release. BBC Thai reporters traveled to Downing Court in Sydney to view court records. Forbidden to make photocopies, they translated a relevant court document into Thai as proof of the conviction that Thammanat continues to deny. Deputy Prime Minister Gen Prawit Wongsuwon asked the Thai people to leave the past in the past, saying the case has already been cleared up and that it was a matter concerning one person that has nothing to do with the nation. Thamanat claims he will sue the Sydney Morning Herald for defamation, although he declines to respond to their reporting.

== Controversies ==
In 1998, while using the name Manat Bophlom, Thammanat was arrested in connection with the abduction and murder of Phulsawat Jiraporn, a young economist with the Thailand Development Research Institute. According to Bangkok Post and Thai Enquirer, Thammanat was detained for about three years while the case was under investigation, which led to the revocation of his army rank.

He has maintained that he was arrested only because he owned the premises where the crime occurred and denied any involvement in the killing.

The Criminal Court and later the Supreme Court of Thailand acquitted him and convicted other defendants in 2004.

Some Thai media reports in the late 1990s referred to him by the nickname "Captain Tui" (Thai: ผู้กองตุ๋ย), a term derived from tabloid coverage of the case; later outlets noted that he rejected the nickname and denied the allegations associated with it.

== Military service ==
Thamanat served in the Royal Thai Army, rising to the rank of captain. He frequently uses his former military rank before his name and is often referred to as "Captain" by the media.

Political activists have asked the Election Commission of Thailand (EC) to answer several Thammanat-related questions: how he managed to get reinstated in the army after his long stay in Australia in "state-sponsored accommodation" and then got promoted in 1997 after returning to Thailand, and why he used the military rank of captain in documents he submitted to join the current cabinet even though his title was revoked in a Royal Thai Government Gazette announcement in September 1998.

== Political career ==
Thammanat began his political career with the Thai Rak Thai Party in 1999. In the 2014 Thai general election, he ran for a seat in the House of Representatives as a Pheu Thai Party candidate, but the election was declared invalid. When the National Council for Peace and Order seized power in 2014, he was one of the persons ordered to report to the National Council for Peace and Order. In 2018, Thammanat joined the Palang Pracharath Party, being appointed chairman for its northern strategy, and was elected to the House of Representatives for Phayao District 1 by defeating Arunee Chamnanya of the Puea Thai Party.

As Deputy Agriculture Minister Thammanat has been active in his support of Thai farmers. In December 2019 he proposed spending 18 billion baht to purchase 30 million latex foam pillows to prop up rubber prices for struggling growers. The proposal would require buying 150,000 tonnes of latex from Thai rubber farmers who would be paid 65 baht per kilogram instead of the market price of 40 baht. The chief of Thai Hua Rubber PLC, in favour of the idea, suggested that the pillows—estimated to cost 600 baht to manufacture—could be sold at low prices or given free to foreign tourists.

Along with several other ministers of Prime Minister Prayut's government, Thammanat was the subject of a multi-day censure debate in the Thai Parliament in February 2020. Opposition parties charged that Thammanat is ineligible to be a cabinet minister because of his criminal record, and says he lied to Parliament about his case. In the course of the debate Thammanat tried to block the admission of Australian court records, arguing that accepting an Australian court's decision as proof of his unfitness for office would be an infringement of Thai sovereignty. During the debate Thammanat went on to claim that the 3.2 kilograms of heroin he was accused of smuggling into Australia was ordinary flour. At debate's end, he was rebuked by 17 members of his own party and received fewer votes of confidence than the five other ministers involved, but kept his job as Deputy Minister of Agriculture.

On 9 September 2021, Thammanat was sacked from the cabinet after he had been accused of being behind a move to oust Prime Minister Prayut Chan-o-cha during the previous week's censure debate in parliament. He and 20 MPs loyal to him were later expelled from Palang Pracharath in January 2022. His group joined the Thai Economic Party, of which he became party leader. Thammanat and his followers returned to Palang Pracharath in February 2023, after Prayut's faction had split from Palang Pracharath to join the United Thai Nation Party.

Following the 2023 Thai general election, Thammanat became Minister of Agriculture in the Srettha cabinet led by the Pheu Thai Party. In August 2024, Srettha was removed by the Constitutional Court and replaced by Paetongtarn Shinawatra. During the negotiations for the formation of the new cabinet, conflict emerged within Palang Pracharath between the factions of Thammanat and party leader Prawit Wongsuwon over ministerial positions. This culminated in Pheu Thai's decision to remove Phalang Pracharath from the government coalition but still retaining the faction led by Thammanat, which obtained three cabinet seats.

== Personal life ==
Thammanat’s parliamentary declaration of assets in August 2019 listed two wives, four children, and a net worth of about A$42 million, including a Bentley, Rolls-Royce, Tesla, and Mercedes-Benz along with 12 Hermès and 13 Chanel handbags, luxury watches, and Thai Buddha amulets.

== Royal decorations ==
- 2021 – Knight Grand Cross (First Class) of The Most Exalted Order of the White Elephant
- 2020 – Knight Grand Cross (First Class) of The Most Noble Order of the Crown of Thailand
