= Thailand Trade Representative =

Thailand Trade Representative ผู้แทนการค้าไทย
- Incumbent; Werapong Prapha; Serving since 5 November 2024; Umesh Pandey; Serving since 5 November 2024
- Office of the Prime Minister; Office of the Thai Trade Representative
- Appointer: Prime Minister of Thailand
- Formation: 29 November 2002
- First holder: Kantathi Suphamongkhon; Kornpoj Asawinwijit

The Thailand Trade Representative (Thai: ผู้แทนการค้าไทย, TTR) is a Thai political position under the prime minister of Thailand tasked with promoting trade and international investment with Thailand. The position was established in 2002 during the premiership of Thaksin Shinawatra.

The current Thai Trade Representatives are Werapong Prapha and Umesh Pandey, serving since 2024.
