= Surakiart Sathirathai =

Thai politician (born 1958)

Surakiart Sathirathai MPCh MWM MP
- สุรเกียรติ์ เสถียรไทย
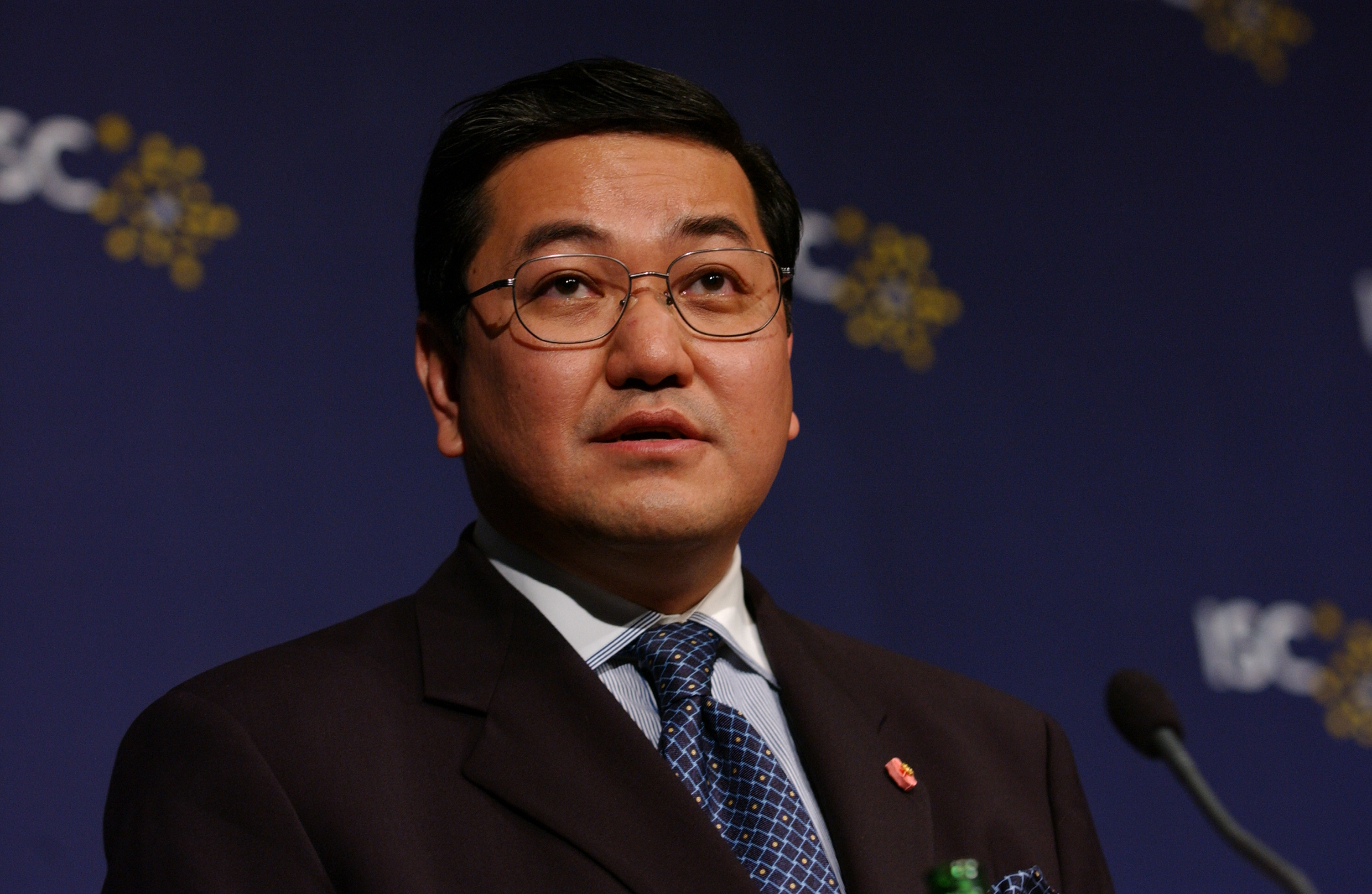
- Surakiart in 2004

Deputy Prime Minister of Thailand
- In office 11 March 2005 – 19 September 2006
- Prime Minister: Thaksin Shinawatra

Minister of Foreign Affairs
- In office 14 February 2001 – 11 March 2005
- Prime Minister: Thaksin Shinawatra
- Preceded by: Surin Pitsuwan
- Succeeded by: Kantathi Suphamongkhon

Finance Minister of Thailand
- In office 18 July 1995 – 28 May 1996
- Prime Minister: Banharn Silpa-archa
- Preceded by: Tarrin Nimmanahaeminda
- Succeeded by: Bordee Junnanont

Personal details
- Born: June 7, 1958 (age 68) Bangkok, Thailand
- Other political affiliations: Puea Pandin Party
- Spouse: Suthawan Sathirathai
- Children: Santithan Sathirathai
- Education: Chulalongkorn University (LL.B.); The Fletcher School of Law and Diplomacy (MALD); Harvard Law School (LL.M., S.J.D.)
- Occupation: Politician; diplomat
- Known for: Nominee in 2006 United Nations Secretary-General selection
- Website: Personal website

Surakiart Sathirathai (Thai: สุรเกียรติ์ เสถียรไทย; RTGS: Surakiat Sathianthai; born 7 June 1958, Bangkok) is a Thai politician who, from 2005 to 2006, served as Deputy Prime Minister of Thailand, overseeing Foreign Affairs, Education and Culture. He previously served as Minister of Foreign Affairs from 2001 to 2005. He is former President of the Asian Society of International Law and former President of the Asian Peace and Reconciliation Council.

== Family and early career ==
Surakiart grew up in Bangkok. His father was Sunthorn Sathirathai, former Deputy Permanent Secretary of the Thai Ministry of Finance, and his mother was Kuakoon Sawat-chuto Sathirathai, Professor in French literature at Chulalongkorn University. Surakiart graduated with a First Class (valedictorian) degree in law from Bangkok's Chulalongkorn University. He earned two master's degrees: one in law (LL.M.) from Harvard Law School with a thesis on human rights, and another in law and diplomacy from the Fletcher School of Law and Diplomacy, Tufts University. Surakiart was the first Thai to earn a doctorate in law from Harvard Law School. His doctoral thesis, "An Understanding of the Relationship Among International Legal Discourse About Development, Third World Countries, and International Peace," (1985) explored the global trade law regime from the perspective of the third world. He later co-edited Third World Attitudes Toward International Law: An Introduction (1987) and authored various articles on law and development including "Peace and Security: The Challenge and the Promise", 41 Texas International Law Journal 513 (2006). From the late 1980s until the late 1990s, Surakiart taught at the Faculty of Law, Chulalongkorn University and ultimately served as its Dean from 1992 to 1995.

== Career in Thai politics ==
In 1995, Surakiart became Thailand's youngest Finance Minister under Prime Minister Banharn Silapa-Archa. Surakiart's supporters maintain that although he inherited a national economy beset by structural challenges that ultimately exposed it to the Thai financial crisis, Surakiart designed and implemented reforms that, while deeply unpopular, moved the economy in the right direction and have become an essential part of Thailand's economic policy. Nevertheless, he resigned less than a year after his appointment over his handling of the collapse of the Bangkok Bank of Commerce.

After his tenure at the Finance Ministry, Surakiart was appointed Vice-Chairman of the Advisory Council on Economic and Foreign Affairs under Prime Minister Chavalit Yongchaiyudh until 1997. Following that, he was President of the Institute of Social and Economic Policy (ISEP), a think tank, from 1997 to 2001. In the late 1990s, Surakiart led several major Thai corporations through restructurings and bankruptcy proceedings and founded and chaired a major Bangkok law firm.

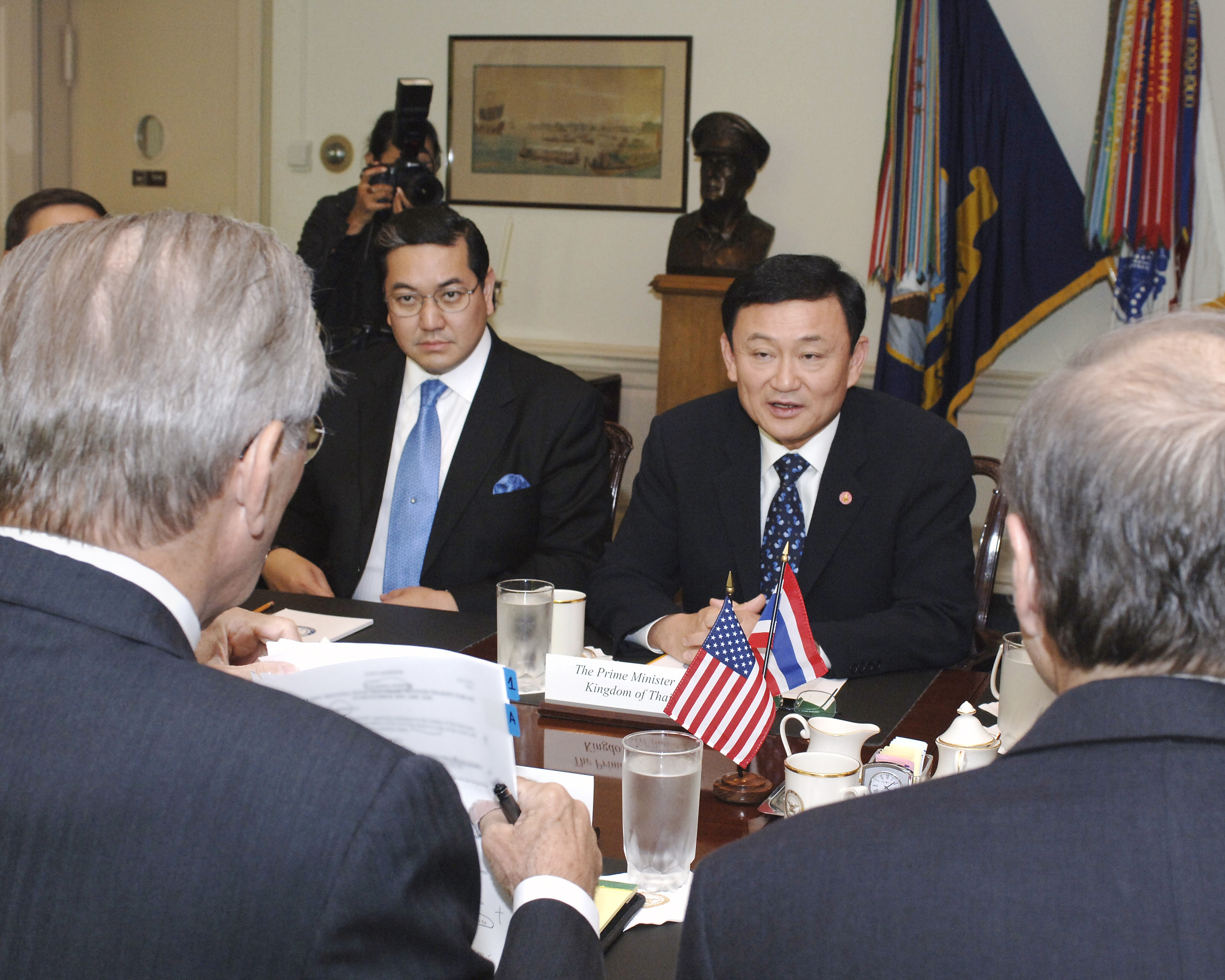
Prime Minister Thaksin Shinawatra and Deputy Prime Minister Surakiart on September 19, 2005

In 2001, Prime Minister Thaksin Shinawatra appointed Surakiart as Minister of Foreign Affairs, a position he held until early 2005 when he became Deputy Prime Minister. As Foreign Minister, Surakiart sought to promote regional economic development through various cooperative networks, including Ayeyarwaddy-Chao Phraya-Mekong Economic Cooperation Strategy (ACMECS) and the Asia Cooperation Dialogue (ACD). On 8 March 2001, Surakiart make a two-day official visit to Malaysia to enhance relations between the two countries. As Deputy Prime Minister and Acting Minister of Culture, Surakiart now oversees the Ministries of Foreign Affairs, Education, and Culture.

On 2 October 2006, he became an independent politician by resigning from his last political party Thai Rak Thai following the coupe d'tat of Thailand. His intention in this political exodus is still unknown but the military junta of Thailand has announced to continue supporting his bid for UN top job.

== Campaign to become UN Secretary General ==
The Royal Thai Government had nominated Surakiart as Thailand's candidate for United Nations Secretary-General. Many other nations, including the members of the Association of Southeast Asian Nations (ASEAN) had pledged to support Surakiart's bid. He was also rumored to have the backing of China, a permanent member of the Security Council. Surakiart's candidature may have been adversely affected by the controversial policies of Thaksin Shinawatra, whose relations with the military junta in Myanmar and handling of unrest in the predominantly Muslim south of the country were particularly contentious. Notably, the Asian Human Rights Commission campaigned against Surakiart on account of Thailand's policy toward Myanmar. However, Surakiart's supporters contended that he spearheaded Thailand's "prosper thy neighbor" policy of regional economic coordination and that his quiet diplomatic style had helped resolve numerous long-standing regional disputes.

The Secretary General is appointed by the General Assembly, on the recommendation of the Security Council. To be elected, a candidate to the post needs 9 votes from the Security Council, including those of all 5 permanent members. The General Assembly then holds a vote; two-thirds of Member States need to support the candidacy for the Secretary General to be appointed.

=== Straw poll results ===
In July 2006 a straw poll was held among the UNSG candidates and Surakiat was placed third, behind Ban Ki-moon from South Korea and Shashi Tharoor from India. Surakiart scored 7 encouragements, 3 discouragements, and 5 no opinions. Ban scored 12-1-2 and Tharoor scored 10-2-3.

In a second 14 September straw poll, Surakiart gained some ground, scoring 9 encouragements, 3 discouragements, and 3 no opinions. However, he still scored third behind Ban and Tharoor. Ban scored 14-1-0 and Tharoor scored 10-3-2.

In a straw poll held on 28 September, however, Surakiart fell into fourth place, winning only 5 encouragements, 7 discouragements and 3 no opinions. The entry of additional candidates, including former Latvian President Vaira Vike-Freiberga, into the race, combined with the military coup that took place only weeks before the poll, were likely causes of Surakiart's loss of support.

South Korea's foreign minister, Ban Ki-moon, won the support of the Security Council's five permanent members in an informal vote on the next UN secretary-general held on 3 October 2006, and was subsequently elected Secretary-General.

=== Jayanama Family's Opposition to Campaign ===
Opposition to Surakiart has been especially vocal among the Jayanama family of Thai diplomats. In a mass rally in front of thousands of anti-Thaksin protesters, former ambassador to the UN Asda Jayanama noted "Because we have a weak foreign minister who responded to Thaksin as if he were his servant, we have been unable to solve any problems".. Asda also claimed that Surakiart Sathirathai parked his car outside the official residence of UN secretary-general at night so he could see it. "It's very embarrassing," Asda told the crowd. The former diplomat blasted Surkiart's candidacy as a lost cause and an embarrassment for Thailand's international standing, claiming that it was "silly" to believe that handshakes from 127 countries amounted to formal endorsements. He has also publicly called Surakiart "a third rate politician", "clumsy", "bungling", and "lacking a brand name"..

Surakiart responded by accusing Asda of defaming him and threatened to file a defamation suit if he didn't stop attacking him in public. .

While Foreign Minister, Surakiart transferred Asda's younger brother Surapong Jayanama to become ambassador to Germany (from Director General of the East Asia Department of the Thai Ministry of Foreign Affairs). He also transferred Asda's younger brother Apipong Jayanama to become head of the Institute of Foreign Affairs (from Director General of the Department of American and South Pacific Affairs). Some have speculated that Asda's opposition to Surakiart might stem from these events .

== Personal life ==
He is married to Thanpuying Suthawan Sathirathai. They have one son.

== Academic rank ==
- 2010 Professor of Chulalongkorn University

== Honours ==
=== Thai honours ===
- Knight Grand Cordon (Special Class) of the Most Exalted Order of the White Elephant (2001)
- Knight Grand Cordon (Special Class) of the Most Noble Order of the Crown of Thailand (1996)
- Knight Grand Cross (First Class) of the Most Admirable Order of the Direkgunabhorn (2003)
- Grand Companion (Third Class, upper grade) of the Most Illustrious Order of Chula Chom Klao (2004)
- Boy Scout Citation Medal of Vajira, First Class (2004)
- Red Cross Medal of Appreciation, First Class (Gold Medal) (2008)
- Red Cross Medal of Merit (2019)

=== Foreign honours ===
- Bahrain: First Class of the King Hamad Order of the Renaissance (2004)
- Brunei: First Class of the Most Honourable Order of Seri Paduka Mahkota Brunei (2002)
- Cambodia: Grand Officer (Mahasena) of the Royal Order of Sahametrei (2001)
- Philippines: Parliamentary Achievement Medal (2006)
- Netherlands: Knight Grand Cross of the Order of Orange-Nassau (2004)
- Sweden: Commander Grand Cross of the Order of the Polar Star (2003)
