= 2025 in Thailand =

- Decades: 2000s; 2010s; 2020s; 2030s
- See also: Other events of 2025; Timeline of Thai history

The following is a list of events and scheduled events in the year 2025 in Thailand. The year 2025 is the 244th year of the Rattanakosin Kingdom of Thailand. It is the tenth year in the reign of King Vajiralongkorn (Rama X), and is reckoned as year 2568 in the Buddhist Era, the Thai calendar.

== Incumbents ==
- King: Vajiralongkorn
- Prime Minister: Paetongtarn Shinawatra (until 29 August); Suriya Juangroongruangkit (acting; 1 to 3 July); Phumtham Wechayachai (acting; 3 July to 7 September); Anutin Charnvirakul (since 7 September)
- Supreme Patriarch: Ariyavongsagatanana (Amborn Ambaro)
- President of the National Assembly: Wan Muhamad Noor Matha (Prachachat)
- House of Representatives: 26th
- Senate: 13th

== Events ==
=== January ===
- 1 January – A tour bus crashes into a tree in Surat Thani province, killing five and injuring more than 30.
- 4 January – Myanmar repatriates 151 Thai prisoners.
- 7 January –
  - Missing Chinese actor Wang Xing is found in Myanmar by Thai officials after being lured to Myanmar, with the case attracting attention on Chinese social media.
  - Former Cambodian opposition MP Lim Kimya is shot dead in Bangkok shortly after arriving from Cambodia. His suspected killer is arrested in Cambodia the next day.
- 8 January - 2025 Bangkok smog: PM2.5 levels in Bangkok exceeded acceptable health standards, beginning the annual air pollution season.
- 13 January – South Thailand insurgency: 10 paramilitary rangers are injured in a bomb attack in Pattani.
- 18 January – 2 February – 2025 Under-19 Women's T20 World Cup in Malaysia and Thailand
- 23 January –
  - Same-sex marriage officially becomes legal in Thailand.
  - A court in Khon Kaen province convicts Olympic gold medalist and boxer Somluck Kamsing of sexually assaulting a 17-year old girl in 2023 and sentences him to more than three years' imprisonment.
- 24 January – 2025 Bangkok smog: 352 schools in Bangkok are forced to close as a result of the city's poor air quality.
- 28 January – The Paetongtarn cabinet approves ฿620 million to combat PM 2.5 dust pollution, forest fires and haze.
- 30 January –
  - Five Thais captured by Hamas during the 7 October attacks in Israel in 2023 are released by the group as part of the January 2025 Gaza war ceasefire.
  - Amid worsening air quality in central, northern and north-eastern Thailand, the government imposes a ban on crop burning.

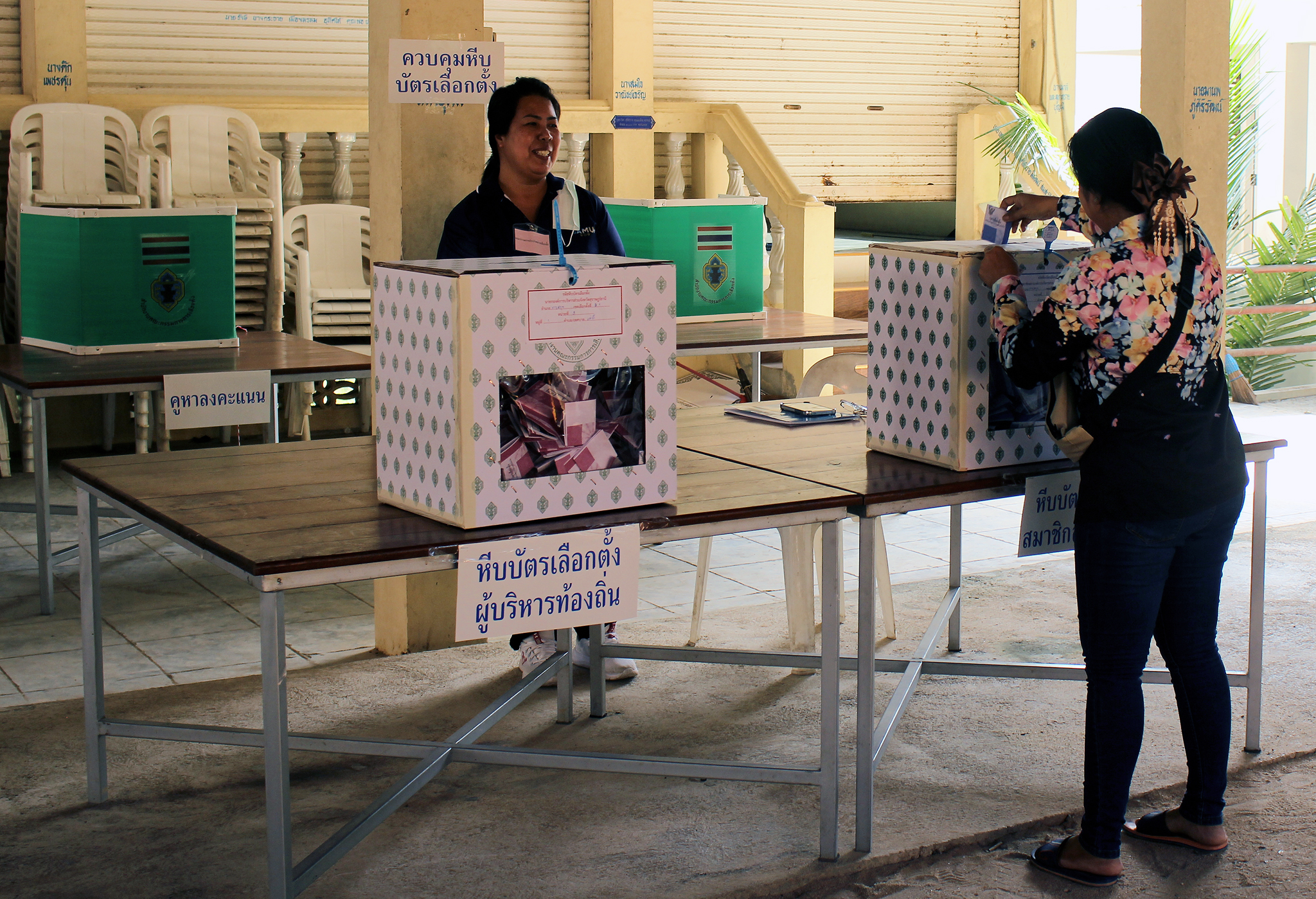
Ballet boxes for the PAO election held in Surat Thani province.

=== February ===
- 1 February – The 2025 Thai Provincial Administrative Organization election is held in 47 provinces.
- 5 February – The Thai government stops the supply of electricity, fuel and the internet to several Burmese towns along the border with Thailand that are known to host scam operations.
- 9 February – Five Thai hostages released by Hamas as part of the January 2025 Gaza war ceasefire on 30 January arrive in Thailand.
- 10 February – Seabed drilling on a bridge connecting Ko Samui to the mainland begins.
- 13 February – Thai soldiers prevent a group of Cambodian visitors at the disputed Prasat Ta Muen Thom temple from singing the Cambodian national anthem, creating some tension between the two countries.
- 15 February – The military in Tak province receives over 260 people, mainly Ethiopians, who were held in scam centres across the border in Myawaddy, Myanmar.
- 20 February –
  - After a decade-long manhunt Suthee Chuamthaisong, who was convicted of corruption by the Supreme Court in 2019 in relation to the rice pledging scheme under Prime Minister Yingluck Shinawatra, is found by Thai authorities.
  - Around 200 Chinese nationals who were held in scam centres in Myanmar are repatriated to China via Mae Sot Airport.
- 21 February – The Embassy of Israel in Bangkok issues outlines encouraging Israelis in Thailand to behave amid tensions between the Israeli community and locals in Pai.
- 22 February — The Supreme Court orders the removal of Bhumjaithai Party MP for Bueng Kan Constituency 2 Suwanna Phumphiro for vote-buying.
- 23 February – Former prime minister Thaksin Shinawatra issues a public apology over the Tak Bai incident in 2004 as part of a visit to southern Thailand.
- 26 February – A tour bus carrying adults on a study trip overturns and falls into a ditch in Prachinburi province, killing 18 people and injuring 23 others.
- 27 February – Forty Uyghurs held in Thailand for over a decade are deported to China at the request of the Chinese government.

=== March ===
- 5 March – The Supreme Administrative Court annuls a 1975 directive from the Ministry of Education banning students from wearing cosmetics or having long hair.
- 8 March – South Thailand insurgency: A series of bombings occur in Narathiwat and Pattani provinces, killing five people and injuring 30 others.
- 11 March – Surachate Hakparn is dismissed as deputy commander of the Royal Thai Police as part of an investigation into money laundering.
- 14 March – The United States imposes sanctions on unidentified incumbent and former Thai officials for their role in the deportation of 40 Uyghurs to China in February.
- 15 March – A section of the Dao Khanong Expressway Bridge collapses in Bangkok, killing five people.
- 26 March –
  - Prime Minister Paetongtarn Shinawatra survives a no-confidence vote in parliament.
  - The Constitutional Court of Thailand removes Somchai Lenglak as a member of the Senate following his conviction for electoral fraud.
- 28 March — A magnitude 7.7 earthquake with an epicenter in neighboring Myanmar shakes multiple areas of Thailand, killing at least 62 people in Thailand, mostly from a building collapse in Bangkok.
- 29 March — Orn-uma Boonsiri of the Bhumjaithai Party is elected unopposed as MP for Bueng Kan Constituency 2 in a by-election to replace her husband Suwanna Phumphiro.
- 31 March — Former MP Sira Jenjaka is sentenced to a one-year prison term for his running for a constituency seat in Bangkok during the 2019 Thai general election despite being ineligible to do so due to a fraud conviction in 1995.

=== April ===
- 2–4 April – 6th BIMSTEC Leaders' Summit in Bangkok.
- 11 April – Nopparat Benjawattananan, a former head of the National Office of Buddhism who fled Thailand following a corruption scandal in 2017, is arrested in the United States.
- 13 April – Four volunteer rangers are injured in a bomb attack outside a Buddhist temple in Ra-ngae district, Narathiwat province.
- 17 April – A court in Khon Kaen sentences MP Ekarat Changlao to nearly 13 years' imprisonment for embezzling 405 million baht from a cooperative.
- 19 April – Ten thousand dancers win the Guinness World Record for the longest Lanna Nail Dance in Chiang Mai.
- 20 April – Seventeen people are injured in separate bomb and gun attacks in Narathiwat province.
- 21 April – A double-decker bus collides with a trailer in Na Di district, Prachinburi province, killing seven people and injuring 40 others.
- 24 April – Three vehicles figure in a collision along Motorway 7 in Samut Prakan province, killing eight people and injuring four others
- 25 April – A Viking DHC-6 Twin Otter of the Royal Thai Police crashes into the sea during a training flight near Hua Hin Airport, killing all six people on board.

=== May ===
- 1 May – The first recorded human fatality from anthrax in Thailand is confirmed in a patient who died in Mukdahan province.
- 20 May – Fossils of a new species of dinosaur are found in Phu Wiang National Park.
- 22 May – The Supreme Administrative Court convicts former prime minister Yingluck Shinawatra of severe negligence over anomalies in rice sales to other countries and failing to act on possible corruption in her government's rice subsidy scheme and sentences her to pay more than 10 billion baht ($304 million) in losses.
- 28 May – A Cambodian soldier is killed following a 10-minute clash between the Royal Cambodian Armed Forces and the Royal Thai Armed Forces in a disputed area along Ubon Ratchathani Province.
- 31 May – Suchata Chuangsri wins Miss World 2025 in India.

=== June ===
- 6 June – The body of Thai national Nattapong Pinta, who was taken hostage by Palestinian militants during the 7 October attacks in Israel in 2023, is retrieved by Israeli forces in the Gaza Strip.
- 16 June – Thirteen foreign nationals are arrested in a raid on a rented house in Samut Prakan province on suspicion of running an Internet fraud operation that amassed $1.2 million from overseas victims, mostly from Australia.
- 18 June – The Bhumjaithai party leaves the ruling coalition following criticism over a leaked phone call between Prime Minister Paetongtarn Shinawatra and former Cambodian Hun Sen in which the former is heard disparaging a Thai military commander. Paetongtarn apologizes over the remarks the next day.
- 21 June –
  - Thailand officially closes a key Cambodian border crossing in Buriram province.
  - The Department of Special Investigation seizes 2.4 metric tons of methamphetamine disguised as corn flour packages worth $90.8 million from a tourist boat off the coast of Rayong province and arrests eight men for attempted drug smuggling.
- 23 June –
  - Thailand orders a ban on tourists and others doing non-essential travel from departing the country through land borders with Cambodia.
  - The government bans traders from selling cannabis to customers without a prescription.
- 24 June – Prime Minister Paetongtarn Shinawatra implements a cabinet reshuffle.

=== July ===
- 1 July – The Constitutional Court of Thailand suspends Paetongtarn Shinawatra as prime minister as part of an ethics investigation into her leaked phone call with Hun Sen.
- 2 July – Transport minister and deputy prime minister Suriya Jungrungreangkit takes office as interim prime minister.
- 3 July – Phumtham Wechayachai takes office as interim prime minister by virtue of a prearranged cabinet reshuffle by Paetongtarn Shinawatra that saw him become her deputy.
- 11 July – A pile-up along Suksawat Road in Bangkok injures 55 people.
- 15 July – A woman is arrested in Nonthaburi province on suspicion of seducing several senior Buddhist monks into sexual relationships with her and extorting 385 million baht ($11.9 million) since 2022 in blackmail efforts against them.
- 23 July – Thailand recalls its ambassador from Cambodia and expels Cambodia's envoy following a landmine incident that injured five Thai soldiers on their disputed border in Ubon Ratchathani province.
- 24 July – Cross-border clashes break out between Thai and Cambodian forces, killing at least 15 people in Surin, Ubon Ratchathani and Sisaket provinces.
- 25 July – 2025 Cambodia‒Thailand conflict: Martial law is declared in eight districts of Chanthaburi and Trat provinces bordering Cambodia.
- 28 July –
  - Or Tor Kor Market shooting: Six people, including the perpetrator, are killed in a mass shooting at the Or Tor Kor Market in Bangkok.
  - Negotiations to end the 2025 Cambodia–Thailand conflict are held in Malaysia, culminating with prime minister Anwar Ibrahim declaring a ceasefire agreement between the warring countries.
- 29 July – Twenty Cambodian soldiers are captured by Thai forces along their disputed border. Two of them are repatriated on 1 August.
- 30 July – Nine people are killed in an explosion at a fireworks workshop in Suphan Buri province.

=== August ===
- 9 August – Three soldiers are injured in a landmine explosion while patrolling the disputed border with Cambodia in Sisaket province.
- 12 August – A soldier is injured in a landmine explosion while patrolling the disputed border with Cambodia in Surin province.
- 19 August – The Bank of Thailand imposes a daily limit of 50,000 baht ($1,537) on online transfers as part of efforts to reduce fraud.
- 22 August – The Criminal Court of Thailand acquits former prime minister Thaksin Shinawatra on charges of committing lèse-majesté in a television interview by South Korean media in 2015.
- 26 August – Luang Phor Alongkot, the abbot of the Wat Phrabatnampu temple in Lopburi province, is arrested on charges of embezzling donations to the temple's HIV/AIDS hospice.
- 27 August –
  - Anchan Preelert, a former civil servant who was sentenced in 2021 to an initial 87 years' imprisonment for lèse-majesté, is released following a pardon from King Vajiralongkorn.
  - One person is killed while seven others are reported missing following a landslide in Chiang Mai province.
- 29 August –
  - The Constitutional Court dismisses Paetongtarn Shinawatra as prime minister after finding her guilty of violating ethics in a leaked phone call with Cambodian Senate president Hun Sen in June.
  - The Bank of Thailand announces that new 20 and 50 baht notes made with polymer are to be released in November.

=== September ===
- 3 September – Acting prime minister Phumtham Wechayachai submits a decree to dissolve parliament. The decree is rejected by the Privy Council of Thailand the next day.
- 5 September –
  - Business tycoon Anutin Charnvirakul from the Bhumjaithai Party is elected prime minister by parliament.
  - An appeals court overturns the acquittal of five prodemocracy activists who blocked the motorcade of Queen Suthida and Prince Dipangkorn Rasmijoti in 2020 and sentences them to up to 21 years' imprisonment.
- 7 September – Anutin Charnvirakul is formally approved as prime minister by King Vajiralongkorn.
- 9 September – Former prime minister Thaksin Shinawatra is ordered by the Supreme Court to serve one year in prison after ruling that his 2023 hospital detention was invalid.
- 10 September – A zookeeper dies after being mauled by a pack of lions at Safari World.
- 17 September – Twenty-eight people are injured following clashes between Cambodian protesters and Thai security forces in a disputed section of the Thai-Cambodian border in Sa Kaeo province.
- 20 September – The World Pétanque and Bowls Federation withholds its endorsement of pétanque competitions at the 2025 SEA Games due to alleged corruption and sexual assault by a senior official of the Pétanque Federation of Thailand.
- 24 September – A sinkhole emerges near Vajira Hospital in Bangkok, damaging three vehicles and forcing evacuations in the area.

=== October ===
- 3 October – The Bangkok Criminal Court sentences Thai national Ekkalak Pheanoi to life imprisonment for the murder of Cambodian MP Lim Kimya in Bangkok in January.
- 7 October – At least 22 people are killed nationwide in flooding caused by Typhoon Matmo.
- 26 October – Prime Minister Anutin and Cambodian prime minister Hun Manet sign an official ceasefire agreement presided over by US president Donald Trump on the sidelines of the ASEAN Summit in Malaysia.

=== November ===
- 6 November –
  - A boat carrying migrants from Myanmar sinks in the maritime border area between Malaysia and Thailand in the Indian Ocean off Ko Tarutao, killing at least 27 passengers.
  - A Russian national wanted by the United States Federal Bureau of Investigation on cybercrime charges is arrested in Phuket.
- 7 November – At least 13 people are killed in flooding caused by Typhoon Kalmaegi in central Thailand.
- 10 November
  - 2025 Cambodia‒Thailand conflict: Two soldiers are injured in a landmine explosion while conducting a patrol along the Cambodian border in Sisaket province. Thailand subsequently announces the suspension of the ceasefire agreement with Cambodia.
  - An appeals court orders the extradition of convicted kingpin She Zhijiang, who is being held at Klong Prem Central Prison in Bangkok, to China to face charges related to operating cybercrime and illegal gambling networks across Asia. The extradition proceeds on 12 November.
- 21 November – The Miss Universe 2025 pageant is held at the Impact, Muang Thong Thani in Nonthaburi, with Thailand’s Praveenar Singh finishing as first runner-up.
- 25 November – A state of emergency is declared in Songkhla province due to flooding caused by heavy rains that leave at least 162 people dead.
- 28 November – Vietnamese Montagnard activist Y Quynh Bđăp is extradited by Thai authorities to Vietnam, where he had been convicted in absentia on charges related to the 2023 Đắk Lắk attacks.
- 29 November – A Chinese national attempting to enter Thailand illegally from Cambodia is injured in a landmine explosion along a section of the international border in Sa Kaeo province.

=== December ===
- 3 December – Thailand lifts a ban on the sale of alcohol from 14:00 to 17:00 ICT on a six-month trial basis.
- 8 December – 2025 Cambodia‒Thailand conflict: Clashes break out between Thai and Cambodian forces along their common border in Ubon Ratchathani Province, leaving at least five people dead, including a Thai soldier.
- 9–20 December – 2025 SEA Games
- 10 December – 2025 Cambodia‒Thailand conflict: Cambodia withdraws its delegation from competition in the 2025 SEA Games in Thailand, citing safety concerns.
- 12 December – Prime minister Anutin dissolves parliament ahead of a no-confidence vote filed by the People's Party, triggering a snap election scheduled on 8 February 2026.
- 14 December – Cambodia–Thailand conflict: A rocket launched from Cambodia kills a Thai villager in Kantharalak district, Sisaket Province, the first civilian death in Thailand in the ongoing conflict.
- 27 December – Cambodia–Thailand conflict: Thailand and Cambodia sign a new ceasefire agreement.
- 31 December – Cambodia–Thailand conflict: Thailand releases 18 Cambodian POWs held since July.

== Art and entertainment ==
- List of 2025 box office number-one films in Thailand
- List of Thai submissions for the Academy Award for Best International Feature Film

== Holidays ==
- 1 January – New Year's Day
- 29 January – Chinese New Year
- 12 February – Makha Bucha Day
- 29–30–March – Hari Raya Puasa
- 6, 7 April – Chakri Memorial Day
- 13–16 April – Songkran Festival
- 1 May – Labour Day
- 4, 5 May – Coronation of King Vajiralongkorn Holiday
- 9 May – Royal Ploughing Ceremony
- 12 May – Visakha Bucha Day
- 3 June – Queen Suthida's Birthday
- 10 July – Asahna Bucha Day
- 28 July – King Vajiralongkorn's Birthday
- 12 August – The Queen Mother's Birthday
- 13 October – King Bhumibol Adulyadej Memorial Day
- 23 October – Chulalongkorn Memorial Day
- 5 December – King Bhumibol Adulyadej's Birthday
- 10 December – Constitution Day
- 25 December – Christmas Day
- 31 December – New Year's Eve

== Deaths ==
=== January ===
- 6 January – Panya Kritcharoen, 75, Roman Catholic prelate, bishop of Ratchaburi (2005–2023).
- 7 January – Lim Kimya, former Cambodian opposition MP
- 12 January – Sudin Phuyutthanon, Thai politician

=== February ===
- 8 February – Komkrit Uitekkeng, 43, Thai academic.
- 23 February – Thanin Kraivichien, 97, Prime Minister (1976-1977).

=== March ===
- 7 March – Thitisan Utthanaphon, police officer and convicted murderer.

=== April ===
- 6 April – Pongsri Woranuch, 85, luk thung singer

=== June ===
- 10 June – Suchinda Kraprayoon, 91, prime minister (1992), commander-in-chief of the Royal Army (1990–1992), and supreme commander of defence forces (1991–1992).

=== August ===
- 17 August – Sawat Chotipanich, 93, president of the Supreme Court (1991–1992).

=== October ===
- 24 October – Sirikit, 93, queen consort (1950–2016).

=== November ===
- 6 November – Binlah Sonkalagiri, 60, writer.
- 27 November – Mom Chao Chulcherm Yukol, 78, royal and military officer.

=== December ===
- 10 December – Manit Jitchan-Klab, 87, politician (PPP, TRT, PT).
- 15 December – Kowit Wattana, 78, deputy prime minister, minister of interior (2008), and commissioner general of the Royal Thai Police (2004–2007).
