= Climate Change Bill =

Climate Change Bill may refer to:

- American Clean Energy and Security Act
- The Bill for the Climate Change Act 2008
- Climate Change Bill (Thailand)
