= Phattarapong Leelaphat =

Thai politician

- ภัทรพงษ์ ลีลาภัทร์

Member of the House of Representatives of Thailand
- Incumbent
- Assumed office 14 May 2023

Phattarapong Leelaphat (Thai: ภัทรพงษ์ ลีลาภัทร์) is a Thai politician, serving as a Member of the House of Representatives for Chiang Mai. Phattarapong is a member of the People's Party.

== Career ==
=== House of Representatives ===
In 2026, Phattarapong urged parliament to pass the Clean Air Bill amidst the 2026 Chiang Mai smog.
