= 2026 Chiang Mai Smog =

Air pollution event in Thailand

- Date: January 2026—present
- Location: Northern Thailand and Chiang Mai province
- Type: Seasonal air pollution and wildfires

The 2026 Chiang Mai smog is an ongoing air pollution event affecting Northern Thailand and Chiang Mai province beginning in January 2026 as a result of forest fires in Northern Thailand and Myanmar. The city was ranked as having the world's most polluted air multiple times throughout March 2026.

== Smog ==
=== 1 April 2025 ===
On 1 April 2026, Chiang Mai municipality declared several areas as disaster zones following PM2.5 levels in some districts exceeding 300 micrograms per cubic meter, almost 10 times higher than the government's safety standard.

=== 2 April 2026 ===
As of 2 April 2026, Chiang Mai was ranked by US AQI+ as the world's second most polluted city, with an AQI of AQI 231 (purple).

=== 4 April 2026 ===
On 4 April 2026, Thailand's Ministry of Interior declared Chiang Mai, Lamphun, and Phayao provinces as emergency disaster zones as a result of hazardous air quality. The declaration will allow provincial governors to disburse emergency funds. Disaster declarations were also made in Pai and Mae Sariang districts of Mae Hong Son province.

Also on 4 April, visibility in Chiang Mai at Nakornping Hospital in Mae Rim district decreased dramatically.

=== 7 April 2026 ===
On 7 April 2026, Chiang Mai continued to be ranked as having the world's worst air quality.

=== 8 April 2026 ===
On 8 April 2026, Third Army Area commander lieutenant general Worathep Bunya chaired an operational planning meeting in Mae Rim and subsequently joined an aerial firefighting mission in Chiang Mai.

== Response ==
=== Tourism ===
Local business organizations, including Punlop Saejew, vice-president of the Chiang Mai Chamber of Commerce, noted bookings for Chiang Mai had been impacted by the smog in advance of the Songkran holiday. Punlop encouraged the Anutin Government to accelerate pssage of the Clean Air Act.

=== Healthcare ===
The air pollution has led to an increase in hospital patients suffering from adverse affects of air pollution.

=== NGOs ===
Chiang Mai Breathe Council, an NGO, called for an increase in clean air rooms available across the province. Thailand Clean Air Network legal team leader Kanongnij Sribuaiam noted that if the government does not take action on the Clean Air Bill by 13 April, the legislation will expire and the process will need to be restarted.

== See also ==
- 2025 Bangkok smog
- Clean Air Bill (Thailand)
