= Environmental engineering science =

Field of engineering science

Students in Environmental Engineering Science typically combine scientific studies of the biosphere with mathematical, analytical and design tools found in the engineering fields.

Environmental engineering science (EES) is a multidisciplinary field of engineering science that combines the biological, chemical, geology and physical sciences with engineering to solve environmental issues. Students in this major also need basic engineering classes in fields such as thermodynamics, advanced math, computer modeling and simulation and technical classes in subjects such as statics, mechanics, hydrology, and fluid dynamics. As the student progresses, the upper division electives allow the student to specialize in a range from science and technology, to engineering related classes.

== Difference with related fields ==
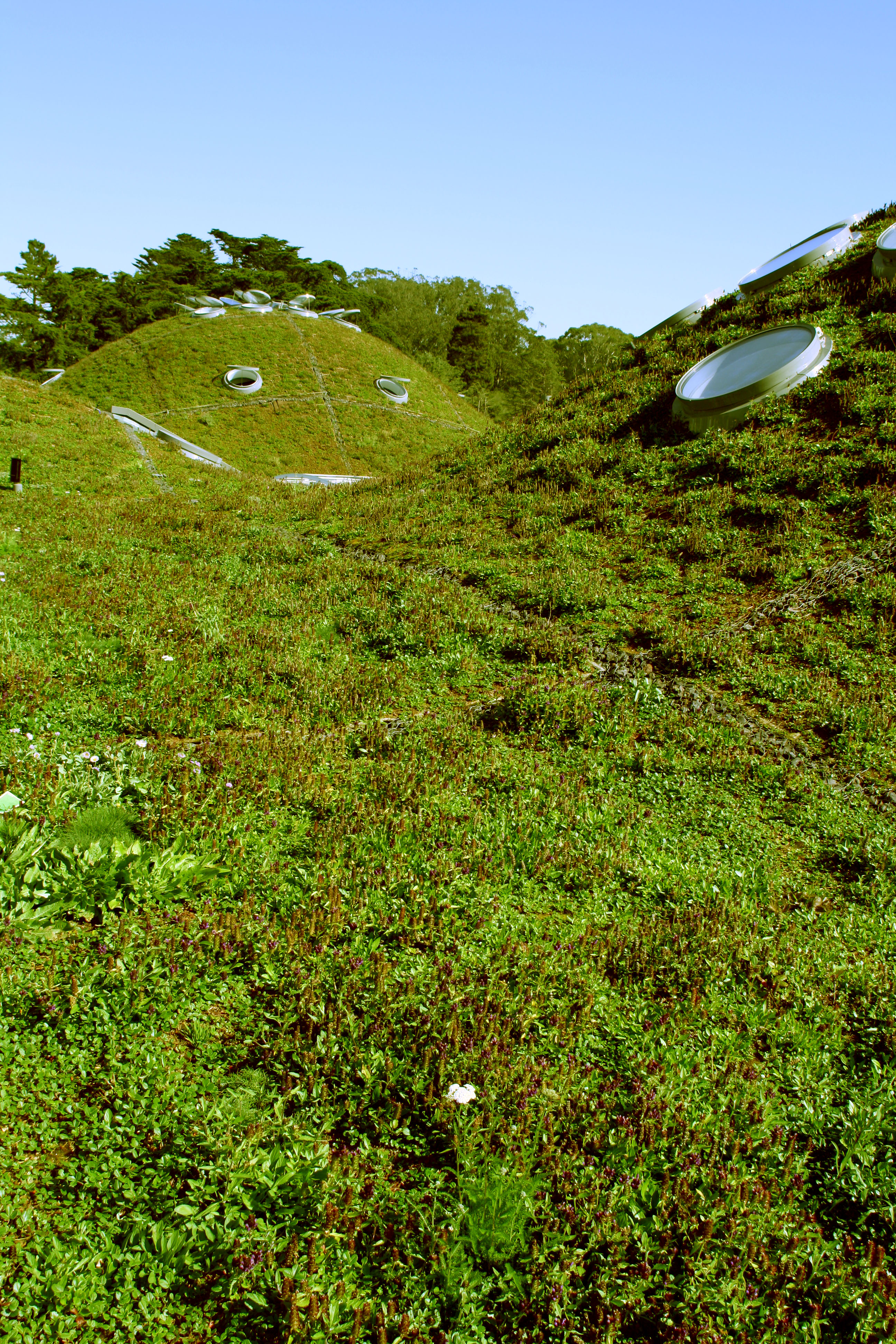
Graduates of Environmental Engineering Science can go on to work on the technical aspects of designing a Living Roof like the one pictured here at the California Academy of Sciences.

As a recently created program, environmental engineering science has not yet been incorporated into the terminology found among environmentally focused professionals. In the few engineering colleges that offer this major, the curriculum shares more classes in common with environmental engineering than it does with environmental science, that entailing how the engineering aspect focus more on the designing of solutions of the issues rather than discovering what these issues might be. Typically, EES students follow a similar course curriculum with environmental engineers until their fields diverge during the last year of college. The majority of the environmental engineering students must take classes designed to connect their knowledge of the environment to modern building materials and construction methods. This is meant to direct the environmental engineer into a field where they will more than likely assist in building treatment facilities, preparing environmental impact assessments or helping to mitigate air pollution from specific point sources.

Meanwhile, the environmental engineering science student will choose a direction for their career. From the range of electives they have to choose from, these students can move into a fields such as the design of nuclear storage facilities, bacterial bioreactors or environmental policies, as well as so many more fields. These students combine the practical design background of an engineer with the detailed theory found in many of the biological and physical sciences.

== Focuses of EES ==
Just as in every other job force as well as other given topics –everything from business to engineering– has various forms of specialization for different tasks, EES is the same in that there are many different concentrations in their work:

1. Water Quality and Resources:
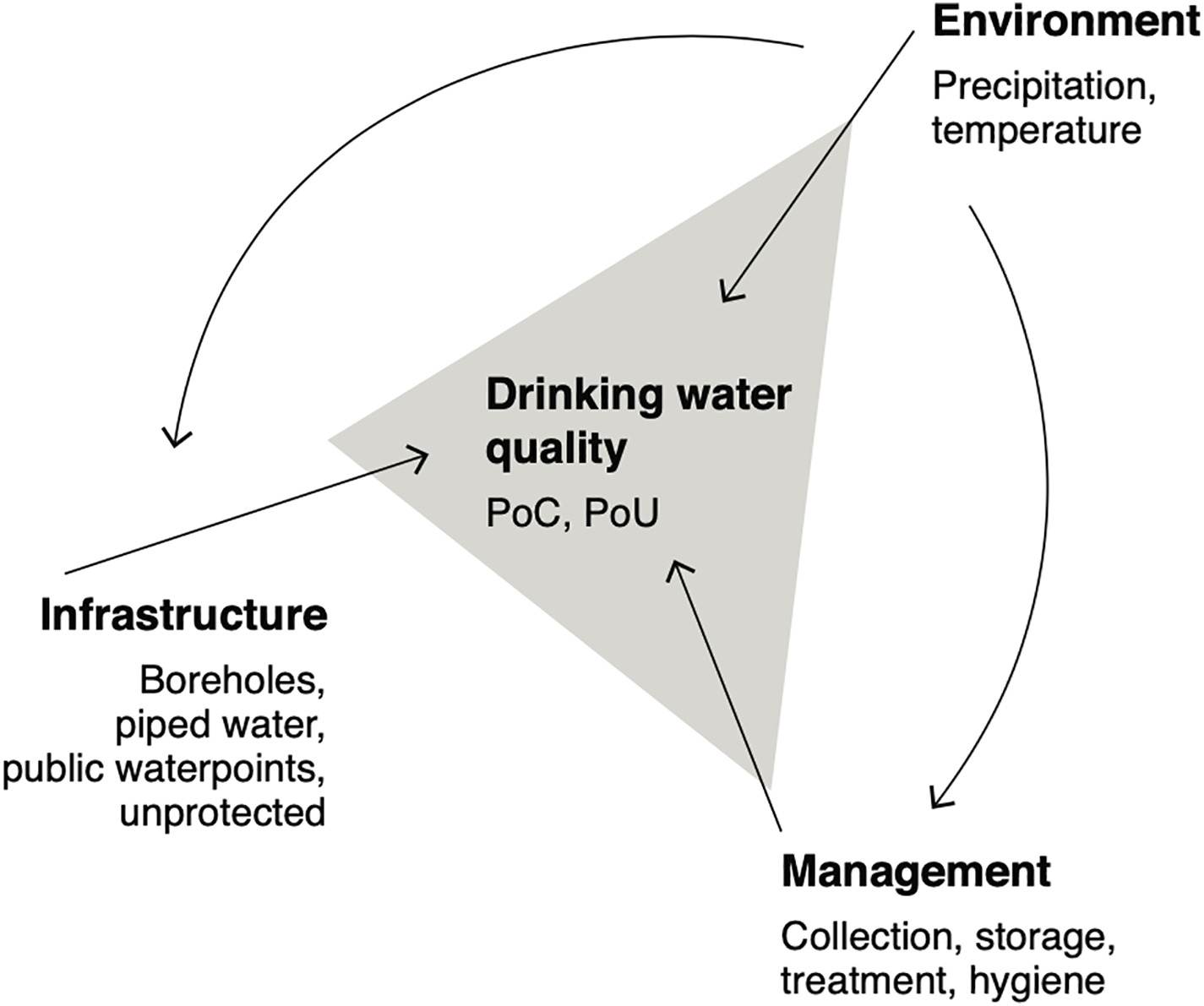
  1. Water Quality Chart.
    In essence, its water quality largely refers to the fact that there is so much to the chemical, physical and biological makeup of water itself, even though it might not seem like it. And each aspect of that is included in water is held to a certain standard that allows it to be labeled as "safe" and whether it goes to water reserves for drinking or is used for other purposes such as agriculture. It is the job of the people in EES to make sure that the water is up to the specific and designated quality that it needs to be, and when it is not, oftentimes this is the cause of a contaminant or a pollutant, it is their job to figure out what the issue with the water quality is and fix it.
2. Air Quality and Pollution Control:
  1. Air quality and pollution control is very similar to the previous branch of water quality. That said, this branch is majorly involved with the monitoring and modeling and mitigating of atmospheric contaminants, especially that of pollution. It aims at protecting public health and the ecosystems surrounding us by reducing emissions, fighting climate change, and by certifying the air quality is within regulatory compliance.
3. Waste Management and Remediation:
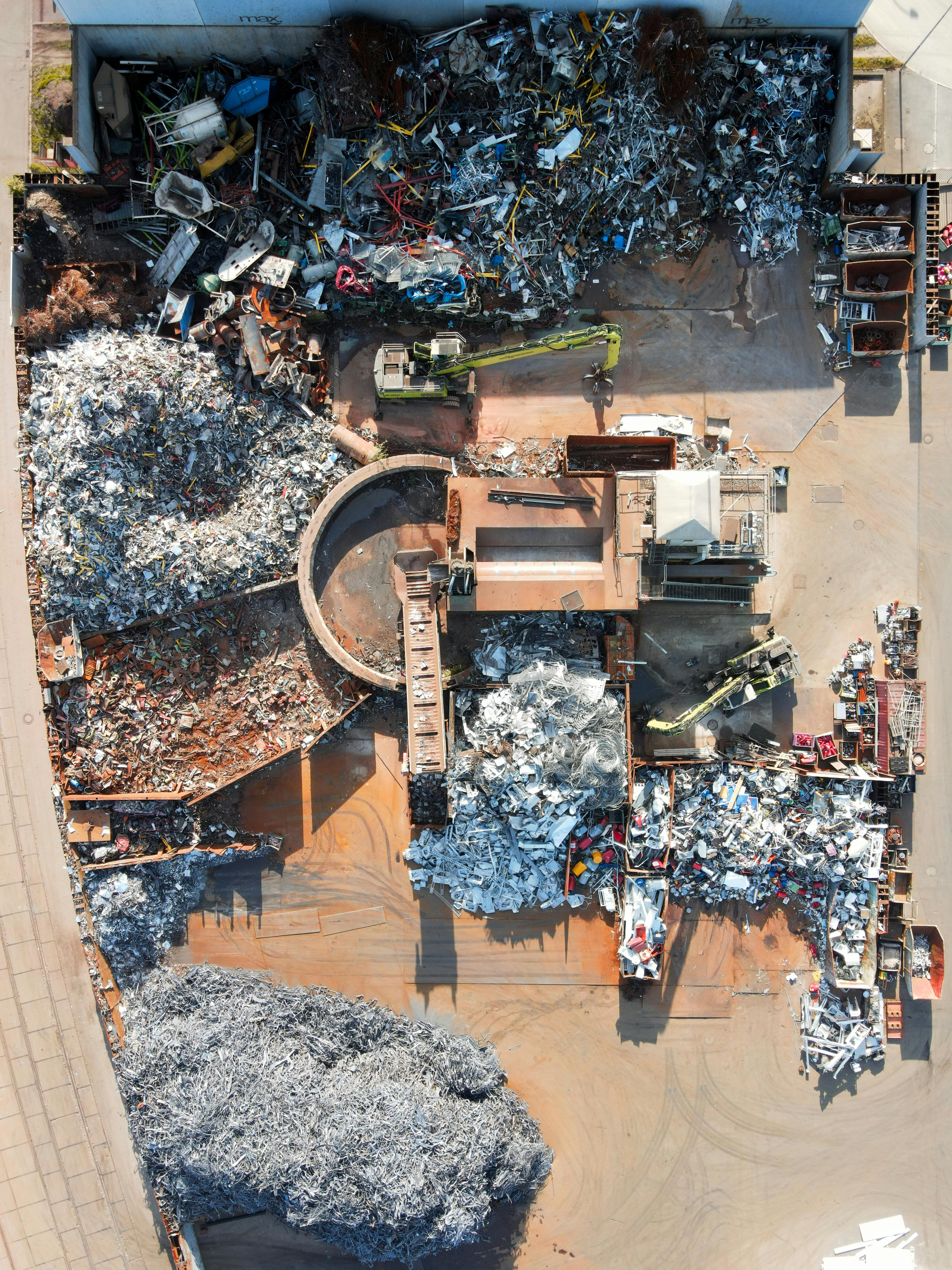
  Waste Management System.
  1. This sub-category is exactly as is sounds – waste management. When it comes to solid waste, and more importantly, hazardous waste this sector is in charge of its removal as well as the remediation of the site or area as well, just to make sure that all of the hazardous contaminant is removed. All of this to make the area safer and healthier for humans as well as animals that live in the areas. Although this is the major aspect of the process, it can also include the cleaning and removal in areas like groundwater, rocks, and even the air, in addition to the soil.
4. Sustainability and Environmental Impact:
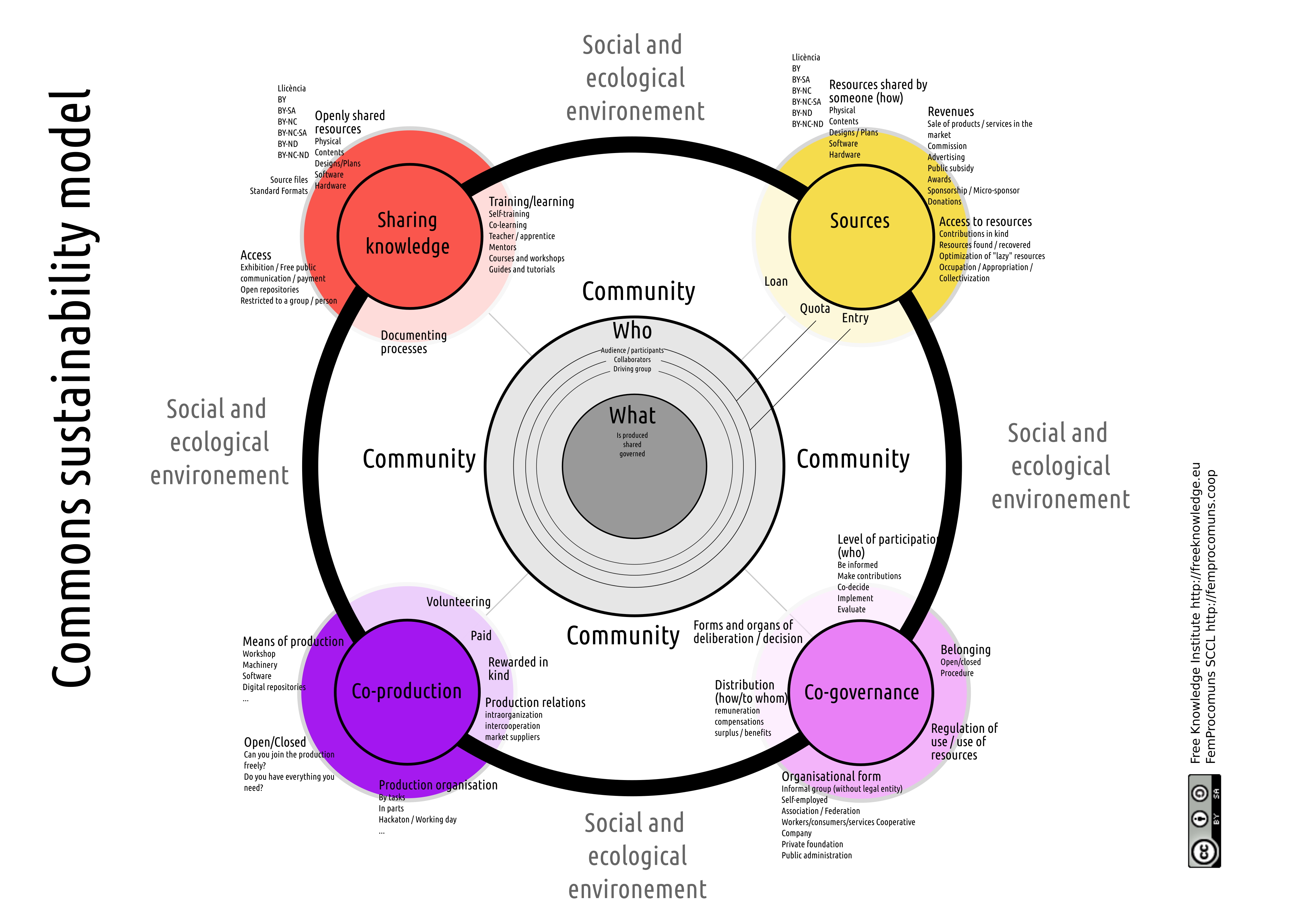
  Common Factors of Sustainability.
  1. In short, this branch of EES manages our relationship with the planet, making sure that we are using our resources responsibly, hoping that the consumption and use of resources is good for both humans and our environment. It aims to avoid the depletion of natural resources and leave the planet better than we found it for the future generations that have yet to come. They promote the construction of green buildings, and develop new methods of renewable energy, in addition to fixing the old ways that we already have in place.
5. Systems Modeling and Analysis:
  1. This area of EES uses collected data to analyze issues that our surroundings and environment might have, and simultaneously developing new methods for environmental improvement.

== Description at universities ==
=== Stanford University ===
Stanford University describes the EES major and related activities below:

The Civil and Environmental Engineering department at Stanford University provides the following description for their program in Environmental Engineering and Science: The Environmental Engineering and Science (EES) program focuses on the chemical and biological processes involved in water quality engineering, water and air pollution, remediation and hazardous substance control, human exposure to pollutants, environmental biotechnology, and environmental protection.

=== UC Berkeley ===
The College of Engineering at UC Berkeley defines Environmental Engineering Science, including the following:

This is a multidisciplinary field requiring an integration of physical, chemical and biological principles with engineering analysis for environmental protection and restoration. The program incorporates courses from many departments on campus to create a discipline that is rigorously based in science and engineering, while addressing a wide variety of environmental issues. Although an environmental engineering option exists within the civil engineering major, the engineering science curriculum provides a more broadly based foundation in the sciences than is possible in civil engineering

=== Massachusetts Institute of Technology ===
At MIT, the major is described in their curriculum, including the following:

The Bachelor of Science in Environmental Engineering Science emphasizes the fundamental physical, chemical, and biological processes necessary for understanding the interactions between man and the environment. Issues considered include the provision of clean and reliable water supplies, flood forecasting and protection, development of renewable and nonrenewable energy sources, causes and implications of climate change, and the impact of human activities on natural cycles

=== University of Florida ===
The College of Engineering at UF defines Environmental Engineering Science as follows:

The broad undergraduate environmental engineering curriculum of EES has earned the department a ranking as a leading undergraduate program. The ABET accredited engineering bachelor's degree is comprehensively based on physical, chemical, and biological principles to solve environmental problems affecting air, land, and water resources. An advising scheme including select faculty, led by the undergraduate coordinator, guides each student through the program.

The program educational objectives of the EES program at the University of Florida are to produce engineering practitioners and graduate students who 3-5 years after graduation:

Continue to learn, develop and apply their knowledge and skills to identify, prevent, and solve environmental problems. Have careers that benefit society as a result of their educational experiences in science, engineering analysis and design, as well as in their social and cultural studies.

Communicate and work effectively in all work settings including those that are multidisciplinary.

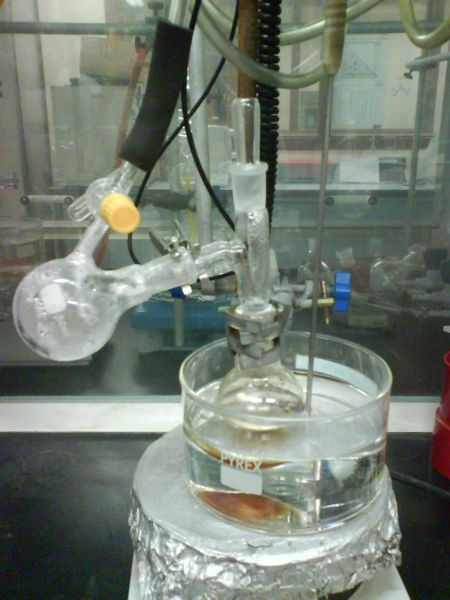
Wet labs are required as part of the lower division curriculum.

== Lower division coursework ==
Lower division coursework in this field requires the student to take several laboratory-based classes in calculus-based physics, physics (the most important of sub-categories being mechanics and electromagnetism), chemistry, biology, programming and analysis. This is intended to give the student background information in order to introduce them to the engineering fields and to prepare them for more technical information in their upper division coursework. These courses play an important role in helping the people who decide to study or work in the EES category get a better understanding of physical and chemical properties that underlie the environmental systems around us, especially when attempting to understand the various forms of quality that the world around us might have.

== Upper division coursework ==
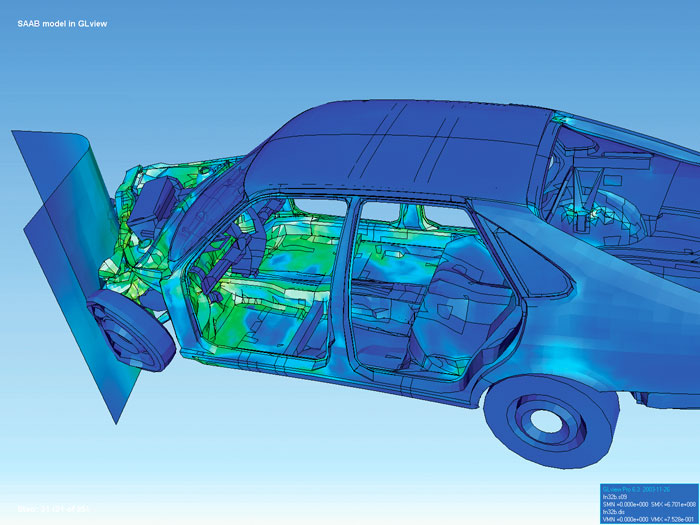
Students learn to integrate their math and statistics with software to perform analysis of physical systems like the Finite Element Analysis shown above.

The upper division classes in Environmental Engineering Science prepares the student for work in the fields of engineering and science with coursework in subjects including the following:

- Fluid mechanics
- Mechanics of materials
- Thermodynamics
- Environmental engineering
- Advanced math and statistics
- Geology
- Physical, organic and atmospheric chemistry
- Biochemistry
- Microbiology
- Ecology

== Electives ==
=== Process engineering ===
On this track, students are introduced to the fundamental reaction mechanisms in the field of chemical and biochemical engineering. It is largely related to that of EES because these classes teach students to develop methods of synthesizing and purifying desired chemical products and they learn to analyze the chemical makeup of various ingredients, determining how they would interact with each other. This is the bare essence of what EES students do – analyze chemical levels to make sure water and air quality is intact.

The image considers a more environmentally friendly process for coal gasification.

=== Resource engineering ===
For this track, students take classes introducing them to ways to conserve natural resources. This can include classes in water chemistry, sanitation, combustion, air pollution and radioactive waste management. Classes that resource engineers take are largely comparable to those of EES, especially its Sustainability and Environmental Impact sector, where they try to avoid the depletion of natural resources and create new methods of making renewable energy sources.

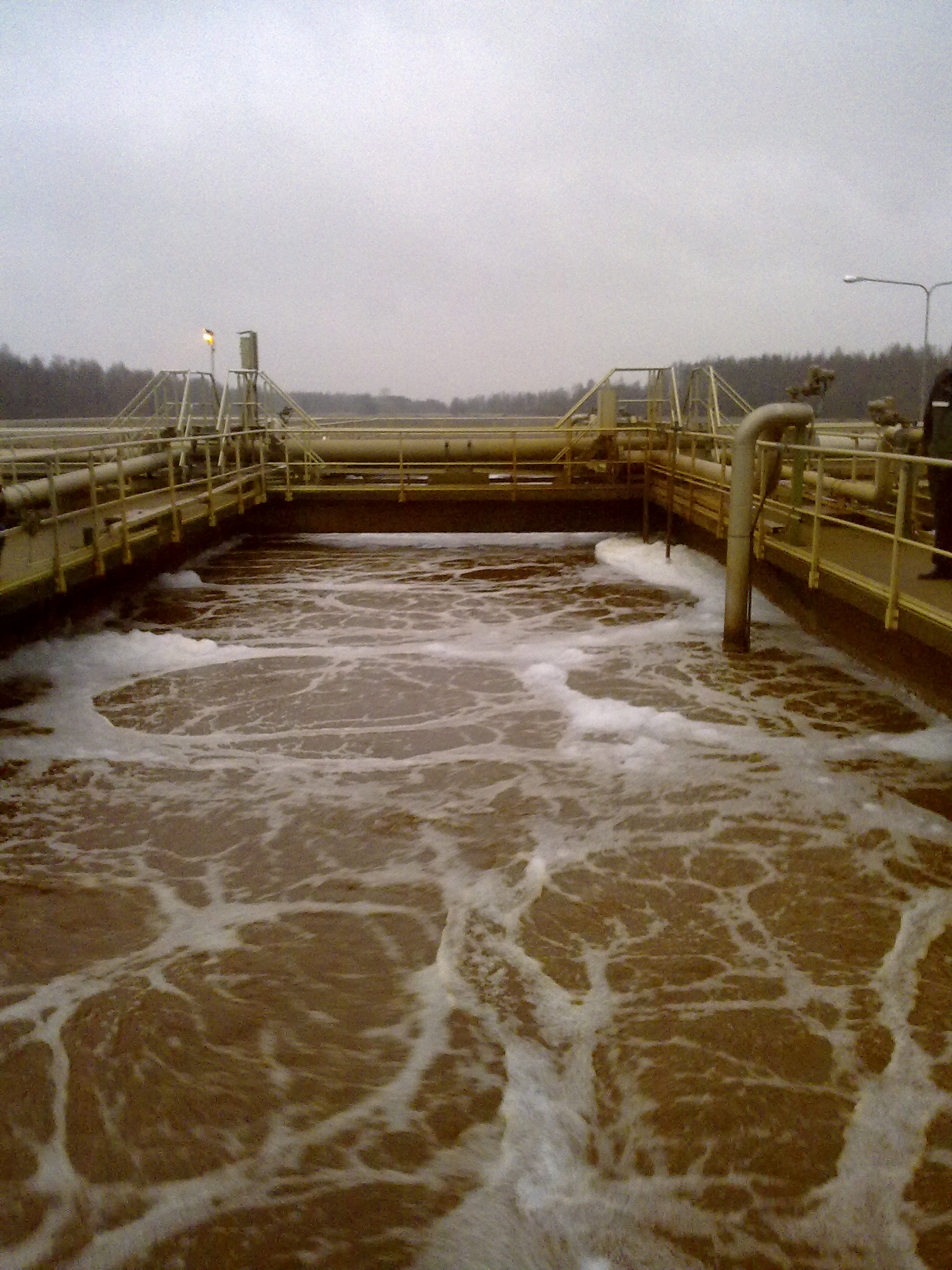
They use their design knowledge to make better wastewater treatment facilities in order to protect natural resources.

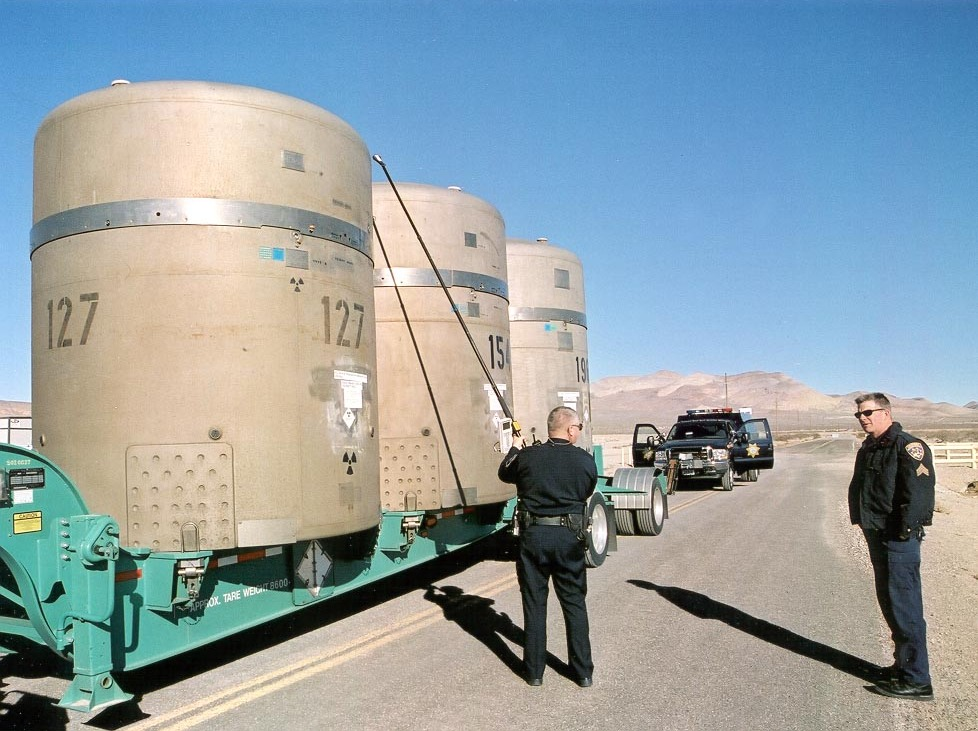
Resource engineers can largely contribute to the designing of various safe ways to store nuclear waste.

=== Geo-engineering ===
To sum it up, geo-engineering is the large scale act of stepping into and aiding the Earth's climate system by attempting to counteract human-caused climate change and other human-caused global impacts. Geo-engineering is related to EES in the sense that it works to mitigate climate change other the world. This examines geo-engineering in further detail.

Image depicts how humans sequester carbon from the atmosphere.

=== Ecology ===
This is a branch of biology that covers the aspects of organisms in a set environment. It prepares the students for using their engineering and scientific knowledge to solve the interactions between plants, animals and the biosphere. In addition, it has common applications in a variety of fields, some of which include, conversation (biology), wetland management, as well as natural resource management, which are some of the biggest factors that are included within the EES learning environment and work force.

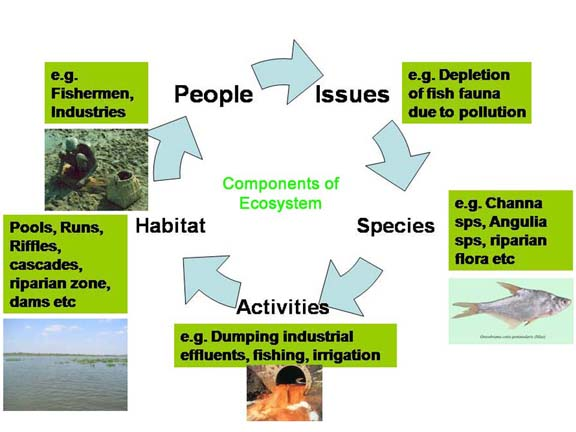
Image shows how one is able to alter certain biological interactions in order to optimize survival of the system.

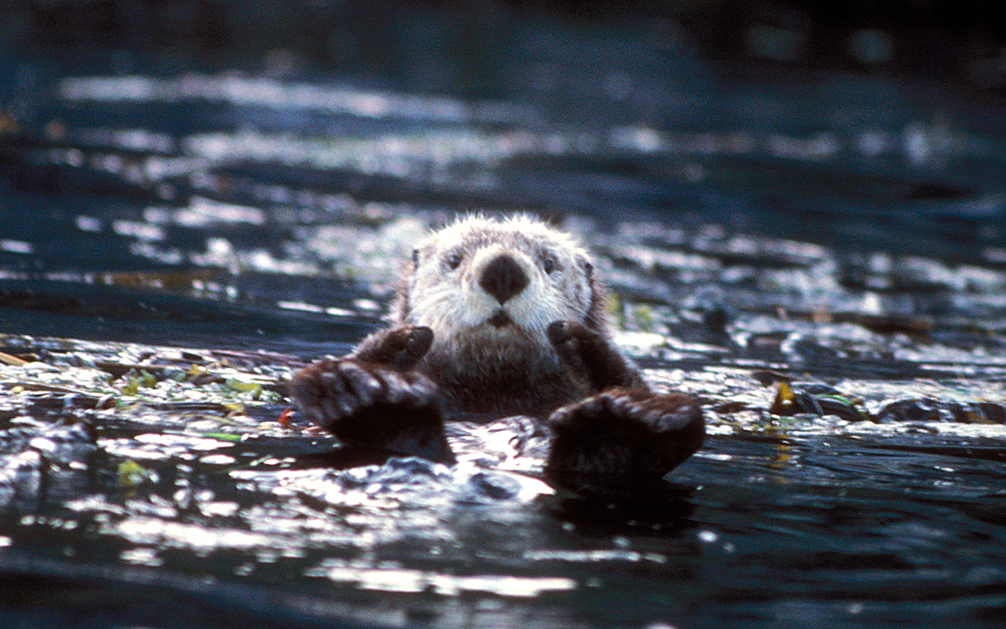
Image of an sea otter, with an underlying story of how the harvesting of kelp affects various populations of marine life.

=== Biology ===
This includes further education about microbial, molecular and cell biology. Classes can include cell biology, virology, microbial and plant biology. This is related to EES on the most basic level, as the student must have a basic understanding of how biology works in order to be successful in this area.

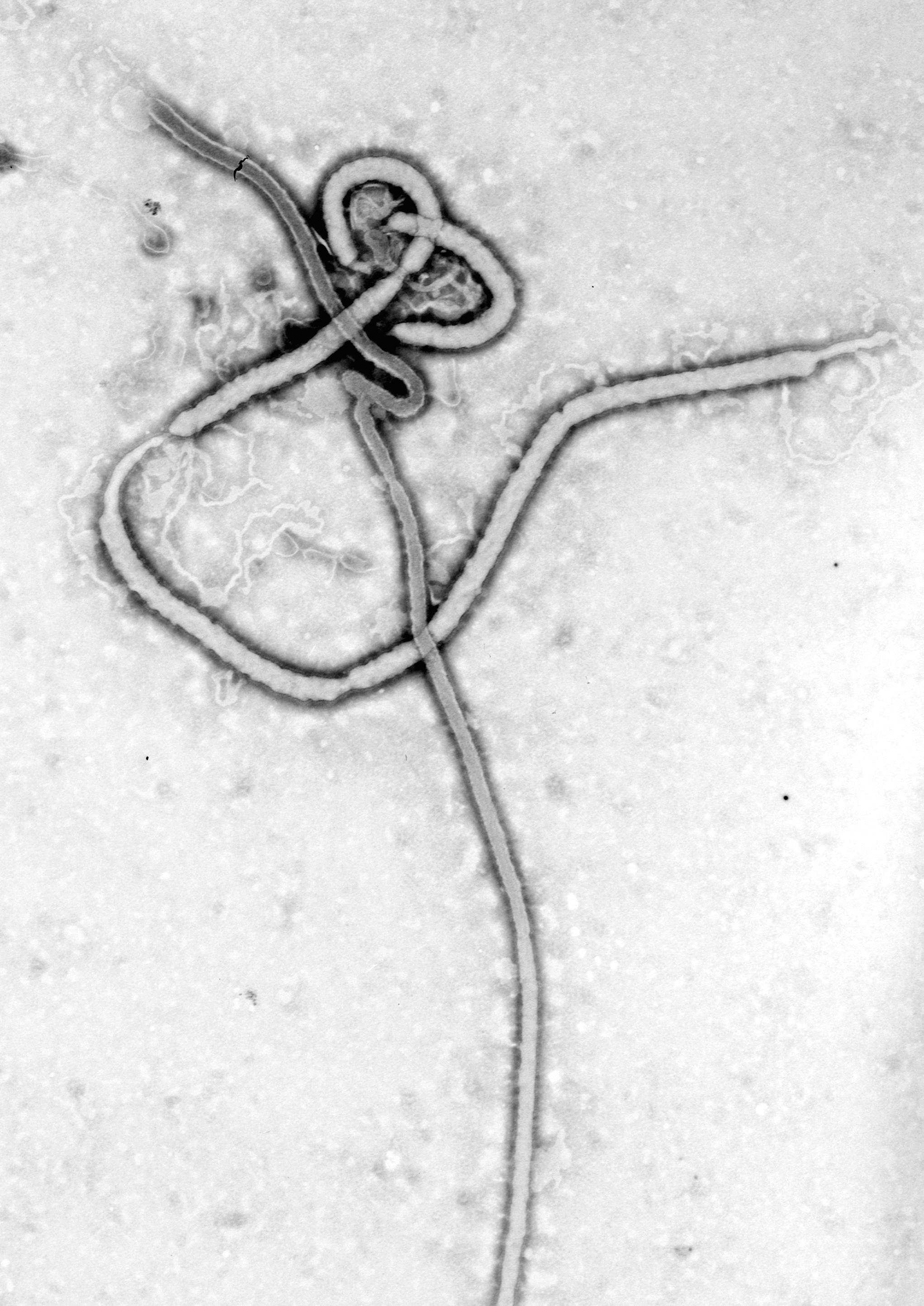
Image of a virus, signifying the importance of understanding the way in which they function in order to safely sanitize water supplies.

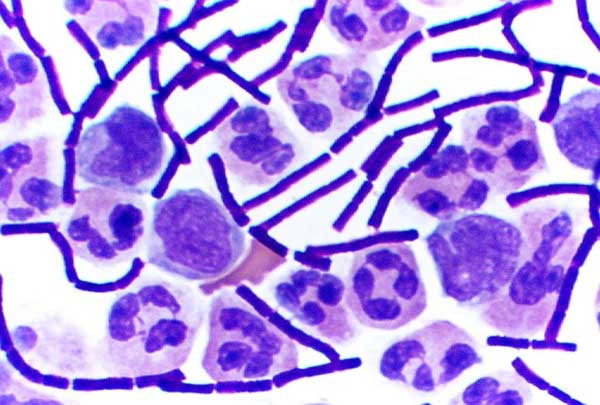
Depicts the necessity in understanding the metabolism of bacteria in order to see how their proliferation affects the climate, along with other effects that it might have.

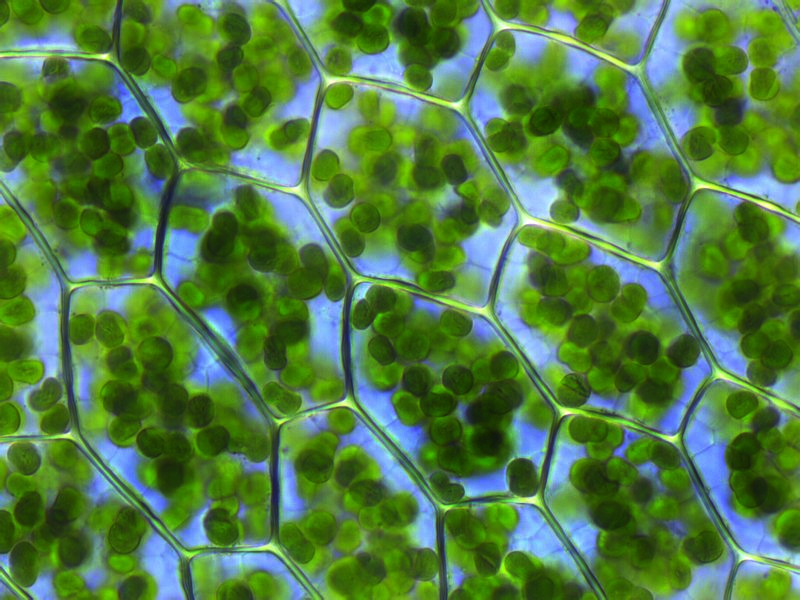
Using the biological design of chloroplasts to design a more effective way of turning solar, and more sustainable, energy into future sources of power.

=== Policy ===
This covers in more detail ways how the environment can be protected through political means. This is done by introducing students to qualitative and quantitative tools in classes such as economics, sociology, political science and energy and resources.

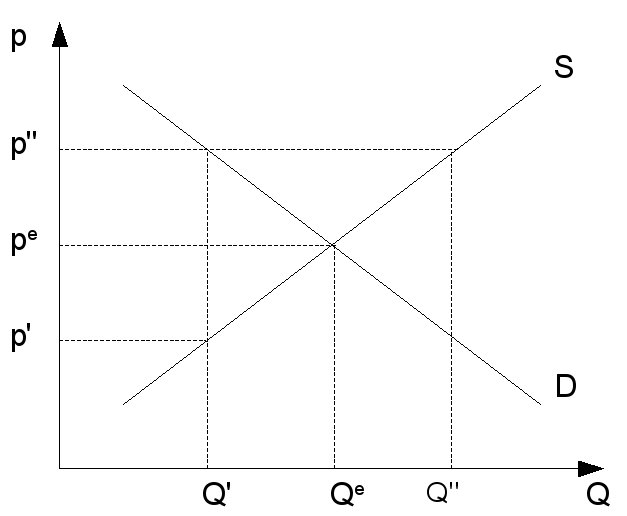
Learning about economics to determine the financial burden it might take to implement an "environmentally friendly" technology.

== Fields of work ==
The multidisciplinary approach in Environmental Engineering Science gives the student expertise in technical fields related to their own personal interest. While some graduates choose to use this major to go to graduate school, students who choose to work often go into the fields of civil and environmental engineering, biotechnology, and research. With an extensive background in sustainability, it is also common to go into the workforce as a Sustainability Manager, or Analysis. And because there is a lesser background in technical math, programming and writing background gives the students opportunities to pursue IT work and technical writing.

== See also ==
- Civil engineering
- Environmental engineering
- Environmental science
- Sustainability
- Green building
- Sustainable engineering
- Process Engineering
- Ecology
