= Thailand 2025 =

Thailand 2025 may refer to:

- 2025 in Thailand, a list of events and scheduled events in the year in Thailand
- 2025 FIVB Women's Volleyball World Championship, the women's indoor volleyball championship in Bangkok and other three provinces
- 2025 SEA Games, the multi-sport event in Bangkok, Chonburi province, and Songkhla province
- 2025 ASEAN Para Games, the multi-sport event for the disabled in Nakhon Ratchasima province, was held in 2026.
