= Clean Air Act =

The Clean Air Act may refer to:

== Legislation in the United Kingdom ==
- Clean Air Act 1956
- Clean Air Act 1956#Further legislation - Clean Air Act 1968
- Clean Air Act 1956#Clean Air Act 1993 - Following repeal of 1956 and 1968 Acts, updated by 1993 Act

== Legislation in other countries ==
- Clean Air Act (United States) of 1963, with later amendments
- Clean Air Act 1972, New Zealand; repealed by Resource Management Act 1991
- Clean Air Bill (Thailand), proposed legislation

== See also ==
- Air quality law
- Canadian Environmental Protection Act, 1999
