= Komkrit Uitekkeng =

Thai academic (1981–2025)

Assistant professor Komkrit Uitekkeng
- คมกฤช อุ่ยเต็กเค่ง
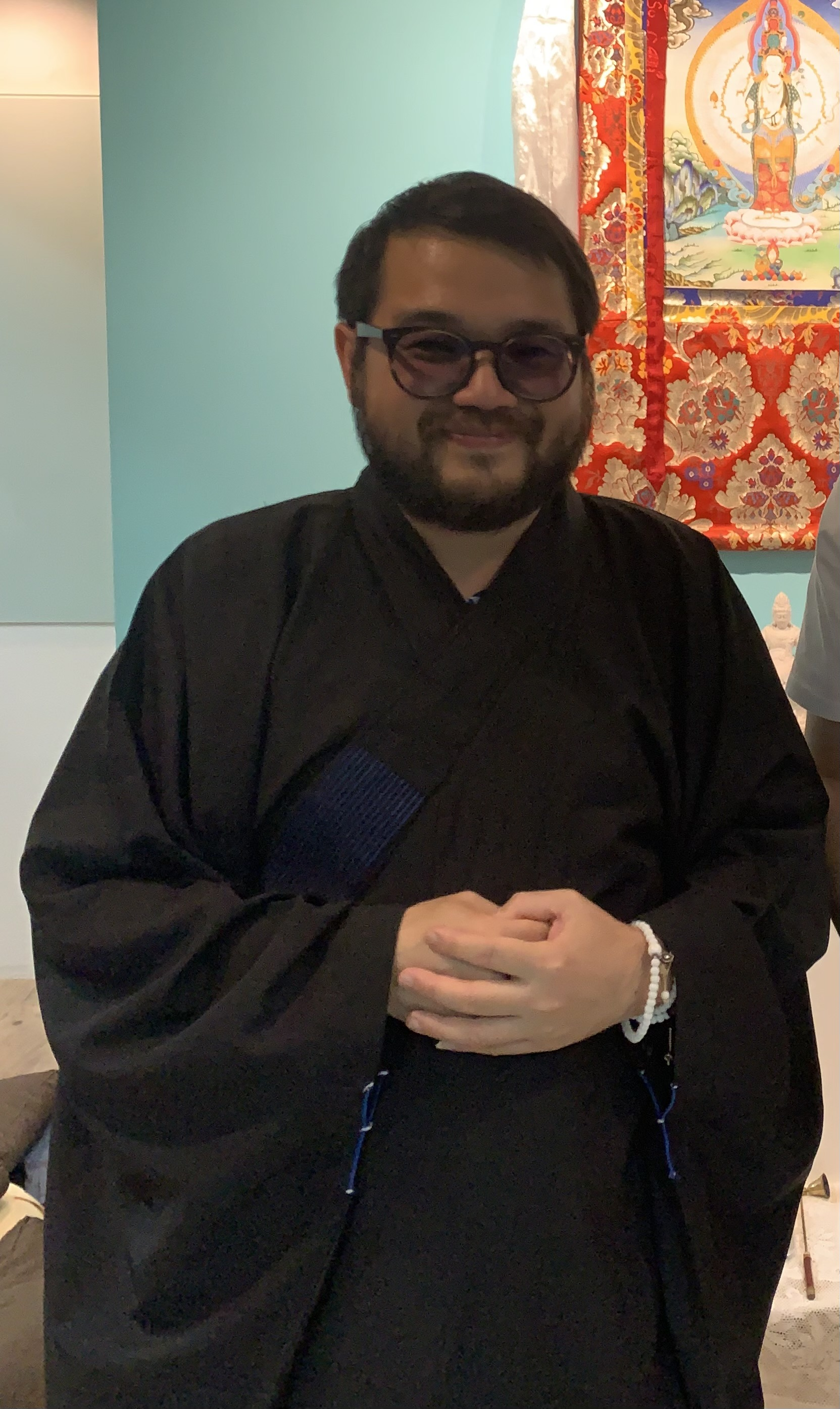
- Komkrit Uitekkeng wearing a haiqing robe in 2023
- Born: 14 September 1981; Ranong province, Thailand
- Died: 8 February 2025 (aged 43); Thailand
- Other names: Tul, Achan Tul, Chef Mi (Note: Thai: เชฟหมี; RTGS: chef mi, lit. 'Chef "Bear"')
- Occupations: university professor, writer
- Known for: Khrua Kak Kak
- Spouse: Wilawan Boonkuekoonlawong

Academic background
- Education: Chiang Mai University; Chulalongkorn University
- Thesis: Mãyã and the status of good or evil in Samkara's Vedãnta (2007)

Academic work
- Discipline: Indian philosophy, religions and societies
- Institutions: Faculty of Arts, Silpakorn University
- Notable works: Column Phi Phram Phut (Note: Thai: ผี พราหมณ์ พุทธ, lit. 'ghost-Brahmanism-Buddhism'; referring to Thai folk religion - Hinduism - Buddhism)

Komkrit Uitekkeng (Thai: คมกฤช อุ่ยเต็กเค่ง; RTGS: khomkrit ui-tekkheng; nickname Tul; Thai: ตุล; RTGS: Tun, 14 September 1981 – 8 February 2025) was a Thai academic and writer specialising in Indian philosophy. He was a professor at Department of Philosophy, Faculty of Arts, Silpakorn University in Thailand and a weekly writer for Matichon Weekly's Phi Phram Phut column. In addition to his academic contributions, he was one of Thailand's pioneering YouTubers from his cooking series Khrua Kak Kak.

== Early life and education ==
Komkrit was born on 14 September 1981 to Sonchai (สนชัย) and Phanthipha (พรรณทิพา) Uitekkeng. His parents owned a Thai-Chinese restaurant J&T in Ranong province where he was born and raised. He graduated primary school from Chat Chaloem School, and secondary school from Phichai Rattanakhan School; both located in Ranong. In 2004 he graduated Bachelor of Arts (Mass Communication) with Honours from Chiang Mai University, following by a Master's in Philosophy from Faculty of Arts, Chulalongkorn University in 2008. His graduating thesis was about Vedanta philosophy of Adi Shankara. He recalled the days of studying Master's as "extremely academic" and often called his mum who said oftentimes "it's fine to quit, come home, and I will take care of you."

== Career ==
Komkrit worked as a professor at Department of Philosophy, Faculty of Arts, Silpakorn University from 2004 until his death in 2025. He specialised in Indian philosophy, Hinduism, and Chinese culture and religions. Senior academic Sulak Sivaraksa once complimented Komkrit for being "truly dexterous in Indology (...) as well as in the field of Chinese [studies]". Komkrit previously held the position of the head of the department of philosophy, and was one of the founding members of Academics for Civil Rights Network (เครือข่ายนักวิชาการเพื่อสิทธิพลเมือง). He regularly called for human rights and democracy in Thailand. He reportedly "prayed to the Jade Emperor"; the Chinese primordial God, "everyday; wishing the country [Thailand] to return to the state of righteousness (...) and that the people to reign supreme in the land."

Komkrit was a weekly columnist for Matichon Weekly's Phi Phram Phut beginning in 2016 with his debut article about Hindu God Ganesha. His weekly articles were compiled into two books published in 2017 and 2021. Moreover, Komkrit was a speaker and a member of online talk shows Tang Wong Lao Kab Chomquan (Note: Thai: ตั้งวงเล่ากับจอมขวัญ; lit. 'a storytelling circle with Jomquan'; a play on the phase Tang Wong Lao; which sounds exactly like 'liquor drinking circle') (hosted by former TV personality Jomquan Laopetch) and Niw Klom Dom Roti (Note: Thai: นิ้วกลมดมโรตี; lit. 'Roundfinger [Hengsawad's pseudonym] smells roti') (co-hosted with writer Sarawut Hengsawad).

== Personal life and death ==
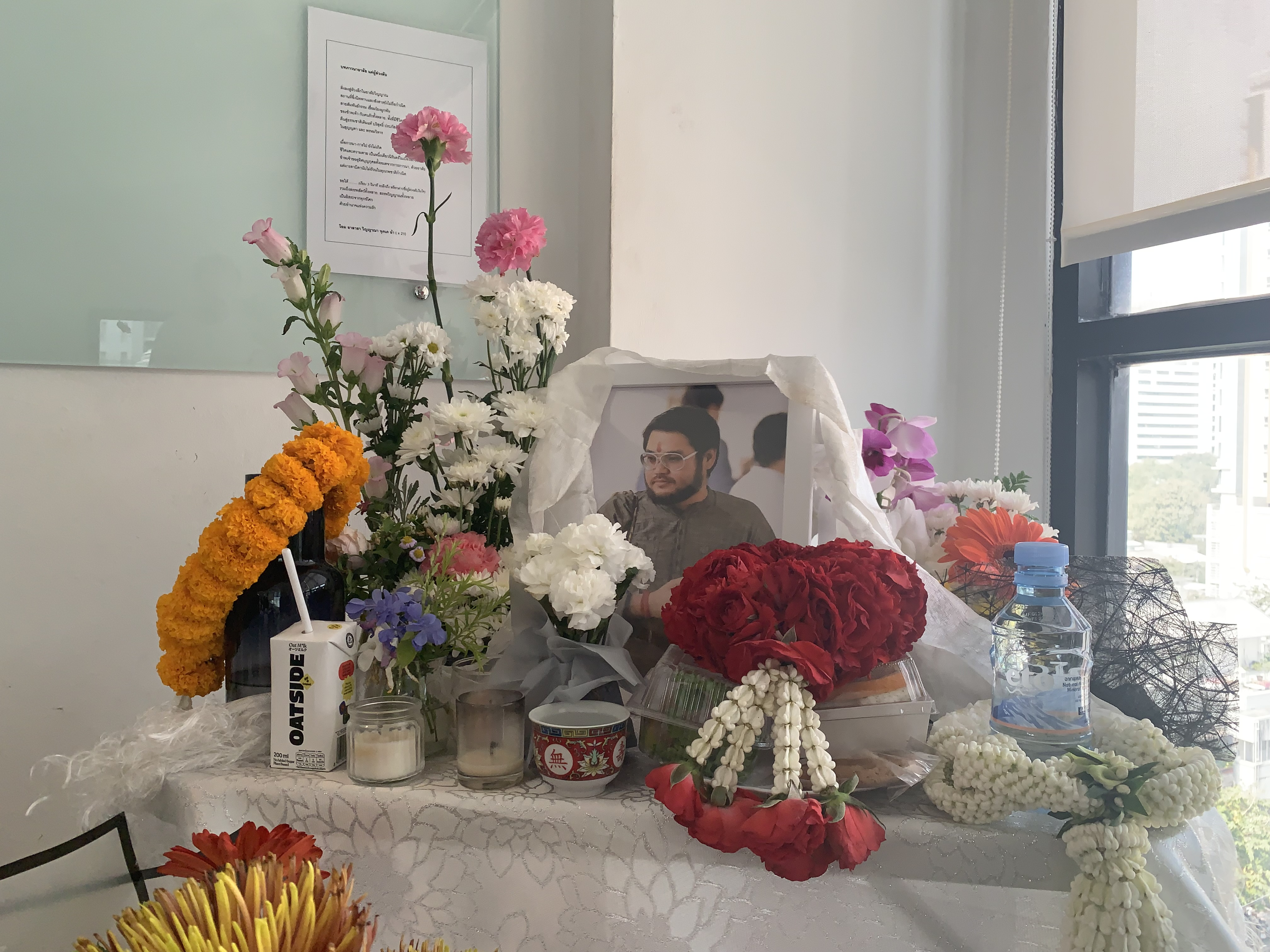
A mourning corner for Komkrit at Avalokita, photographed on 12 February 2025

Komkrit was married to Wilawan Boonkuekoonlawong (Thai: วิลาวัณย์ บุญเกื้อกุลวงษ์; RTGS: wilawan bunkuaekunlawong), a mental health and behavioural therapist. Their wedding was a Hindu wedding held at Silpakorn University, Sanam Chandra Palace campus in February 2016. The wedding was documented by ThaiPBS for its TV documentary on Indian weddings.

Komkrit died from an acute heart attack on 8 February 2025, at the age of 43. He was survived by his wife and friends. His last rites and cremation was on 17 February at Wat Suwan Khiri Wihan in his hometown of Ranong. The meditation centre Avalokita in Bangkok, which he co-founded, brought Japanese monk Bhikshu Gyomyo Nakamura for a memorial service on 11 February. His death was mourned by the public, including television personality Jomquan Laopetch and writer Sarawut Hengsawad; both of whom were with Komkrit at the hospital before his death, actress Intira Charoenpura, and senior activist Sulak Sivaraksa.

== Works ==
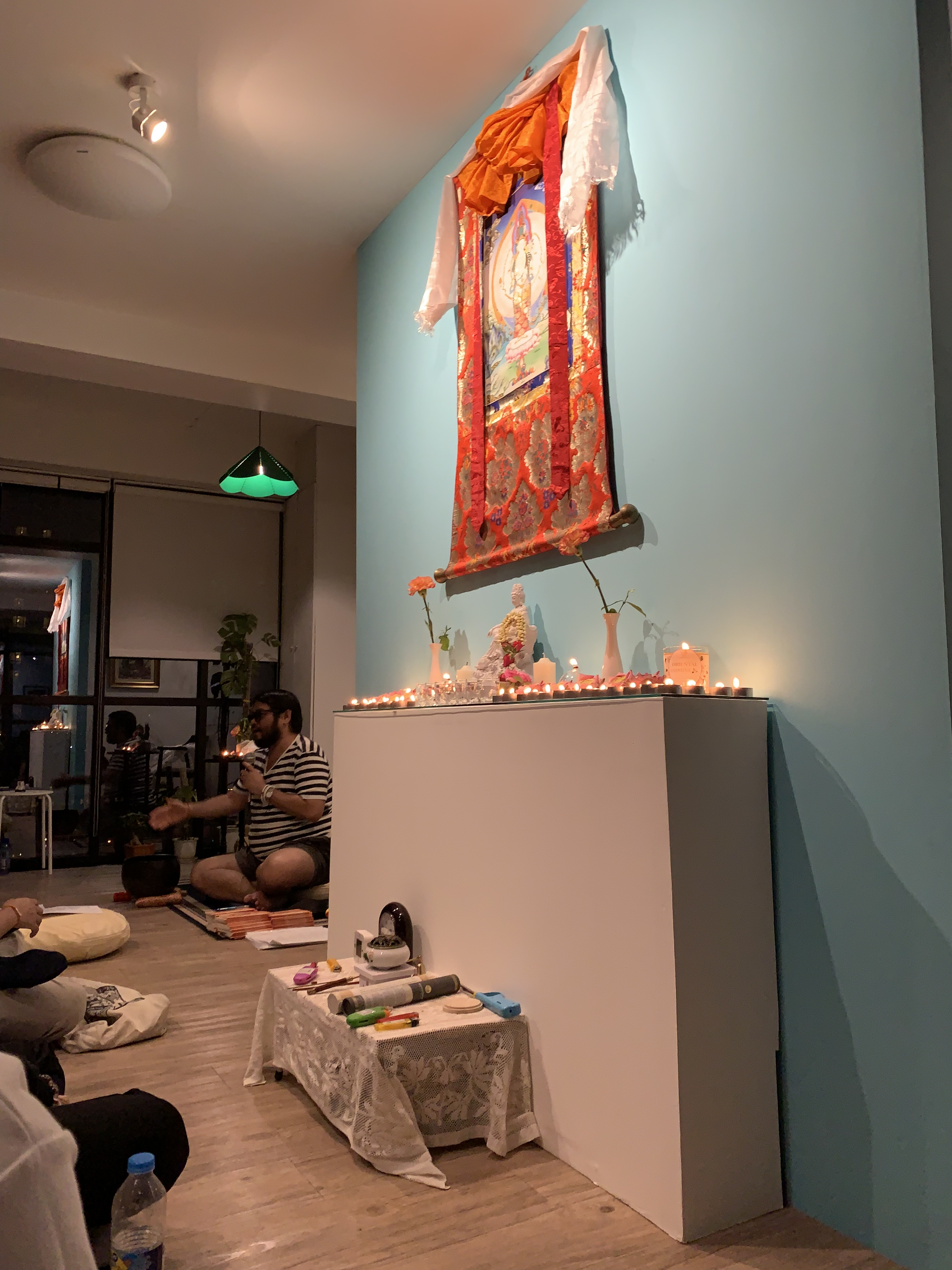
Komkrit (leftmost) leading the 2022 year-end Buddhist prayer at Avalokita meditation centre in Bangkok

=== Vajrapanya Foundation ===
Komkrit was one of the co-founders of Vajrapanya Foundation (Thai: มูลนิธิวัขรปัญญา) together with Vichak Panich. The foundation was founded as "a contemporary spiritual space" and operates through Vajrasiddha (Thai: วัชรสิทธา), a learning space that Komkrit called "an alternative university". Another operation of the foundation is Avalokita (Thai: อวโลกิตะ), a non-monastic meditation centre in Bangkok. Komkrit also regularly volunteered as a prayer-leader and lecturer for both projects. Another project of Vajrapanya is Padmakara, a spiritual retreat on Koh Phangan island, where Komkrit had a vision of it being the first "laymen's temple". Named after one of Guru Rinpoche's alias, the centre was still under construction when he died.

=== Khrua Kak Kak ===
Komkrit was known online from his cooking show on YouTube titled Khrua Kak Kak Doi Chef Mi (Note: Thai: ครัวกาก ๆ โดย เชฟหมี; lit. 'rubbish-ish kitchen by Chef Mi') beginning in 2011. He had since gained an alias "Chef Mi". He had a unique presentation style and was noted for cooking with "only what's left in the fridge". Nowadays, he is generally recognised as one of "Thailand's pioneering YouTubers"

== Books ==
- ศรีหริทาส (นามแฝง) (2009). คเณศวิทยา [Ganesh Vidyā (Ganesh studies)] (in Thai). นครปฐม: ภาควิชาปรัชญา คณะอักษรศาสตร์ มหาวิทยาลัยศิลปากร.
- อุ่ยเต็กเค่ง, คมกฤช (2017). ภารตะ-สยาม? ผี พราหมณ์ พุทธ? [Bharata [India] - Siam [Thailand]? Phi-Phram-Phut?] (in Thai). กรุงเทพฯ: มติชน. ISBN 9789740215646.
- อุ่ยเต็กเค่ง, คมกฤช; พานิช, วิจักขณ์; เหล่ามานะเจริญ, ศิริพจน์ (2021). ผี พราหมณ์ พุทธในศาสนาไทย [Phi-Phram-Phut in 'the Thai religion'] (in Thai). กรุงเทพฯ: นาตาแฮก. ISBN 9786165942324.
- อุ่ยเต็กเค่ง, คมกฤช (2021). ภารตะ – สยาม ศาสนาต้อง(ไม่)ห้ามเรื่องการเมือง? [Bharata [India]-Siam [Thailand] - Politics is (NOT) forbidden by religions?] (in Thai). กรุงเทพฯ: มติชน. ISBN 9789740217589.

=== Translations ===
- ภควันรามนะมหาฤาษี (2017). อาตมะโพธะ : สี่สิบโศลกพินิจสัจจะของรามนะมหาฤษี. Translated by อุ่ยเต็กเค่ง, คมกฤช. ปลากระโดด. ISBN 9786168148006.
- วิมุกโตทัย: บทสวดสรรเสริญพระศิวะ สันสกฤต-ไทย. Translated by ศรีหริทาส (นามแฝง). 2007.
