= Shanti Stupa, Ladakh =

Stupa in Ladakh, India

Shanti Stupa
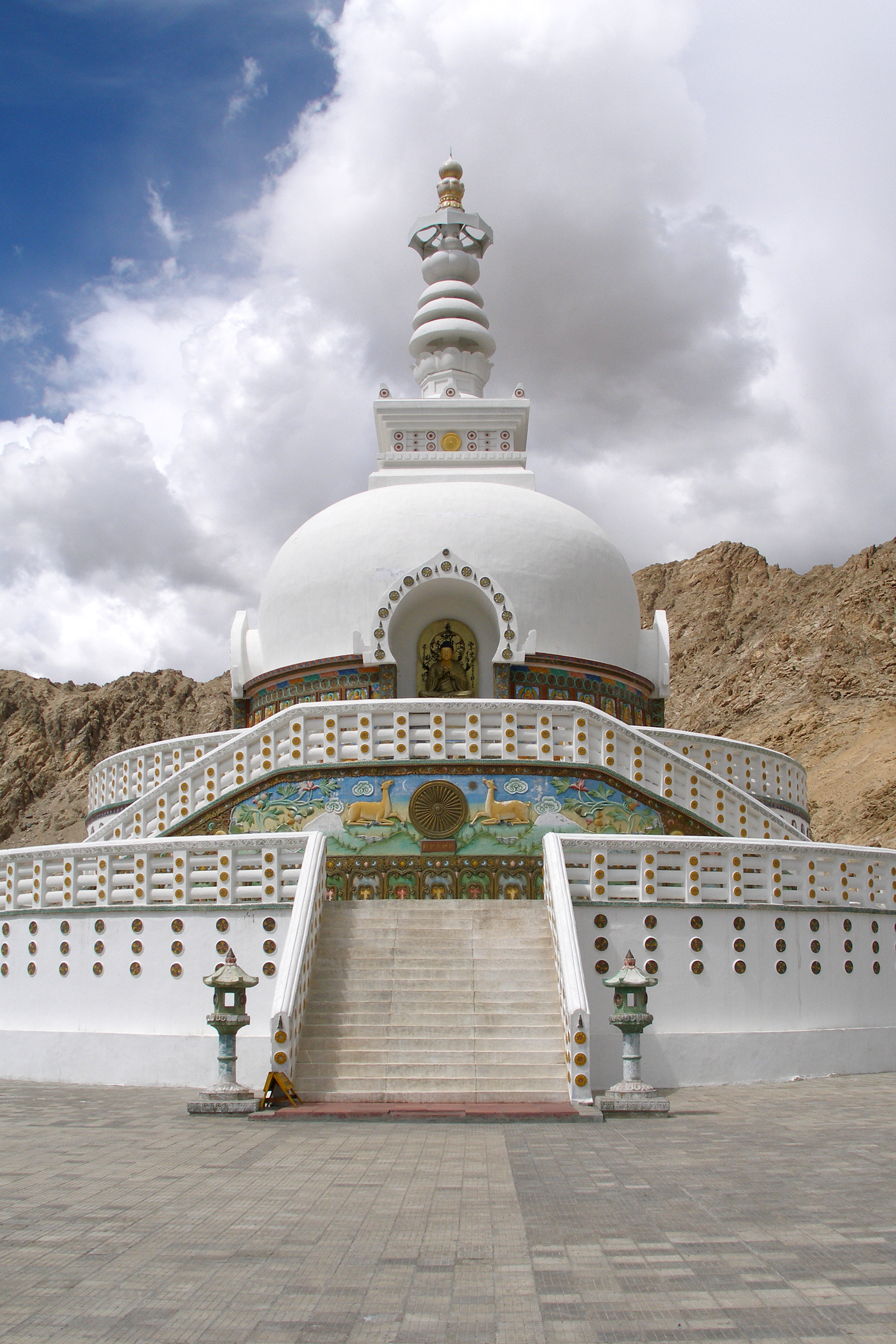

Religion
- Affiliation: Tibetan Buddhism

Location
- Location: Chanspa, Leh district, Ladakh, India
- Country: India
- Interactive map of Shanti Stupa
- Coordinates: 34°10′25″N 77°34′29″E

Architecture
- Style: Bhikshu Gyomyo Nakamura
- Founder: Ladakh Shanti Stupa Committee under Bhikshu Gyomyo Nakamura
- Established: 2011

Shanti Stupa is a Buddhist white-domed Stupa (chorten) on a hilltop in Chanspa, Leh district, Ladakh, in north India. It was built in 1991 by Japanese Buddhist monk Gyomyo Nakamura. The Shanti Stupa holds the relics of the Buddha at its base, enshrined by the 14th Dalai Lama. The Stupa has become a tourist attraction not only due to its religious significance but also due to its location which provides panoramic views of the surrounding landscape.

== Construction ==
The Shanti Stupa was built by both Japanese Buddhists and Ladakh Buddhists. The original idea belonged to The Great King Ashoka. Nichidatsu Fujii implemented his idea to modern time as a symbol of peace. The mission of Nichidatsu Fujii was to build Shanti Stupa as a symbol of peace.

Construction of the Shanti Stupa began in April 1983 under the supervision of Bhikshu Gyomyo Nakamura, and Kushok Bakula, a Head Lama of Ladakh, helped his activities from New Delhi because he was member of the Minority Commission of Govt of India. The project was built with the help of Ladakhi Buddhists, who offered voluntary labour, and financially supported by Japanese Buddhists as well as Indian supporters. The then Prime Minister of India, Indira Gandhi, sanctioned the construction of a vehicular road to the stupa in 1984. The Indian Army continued support during the construction period. The State Government of J&K provided construction materials for this project. The 14th Dalai Lama, Tenzin Gyatso inaugurated foundation of Stupa in August 1985.

== Description and significance ==
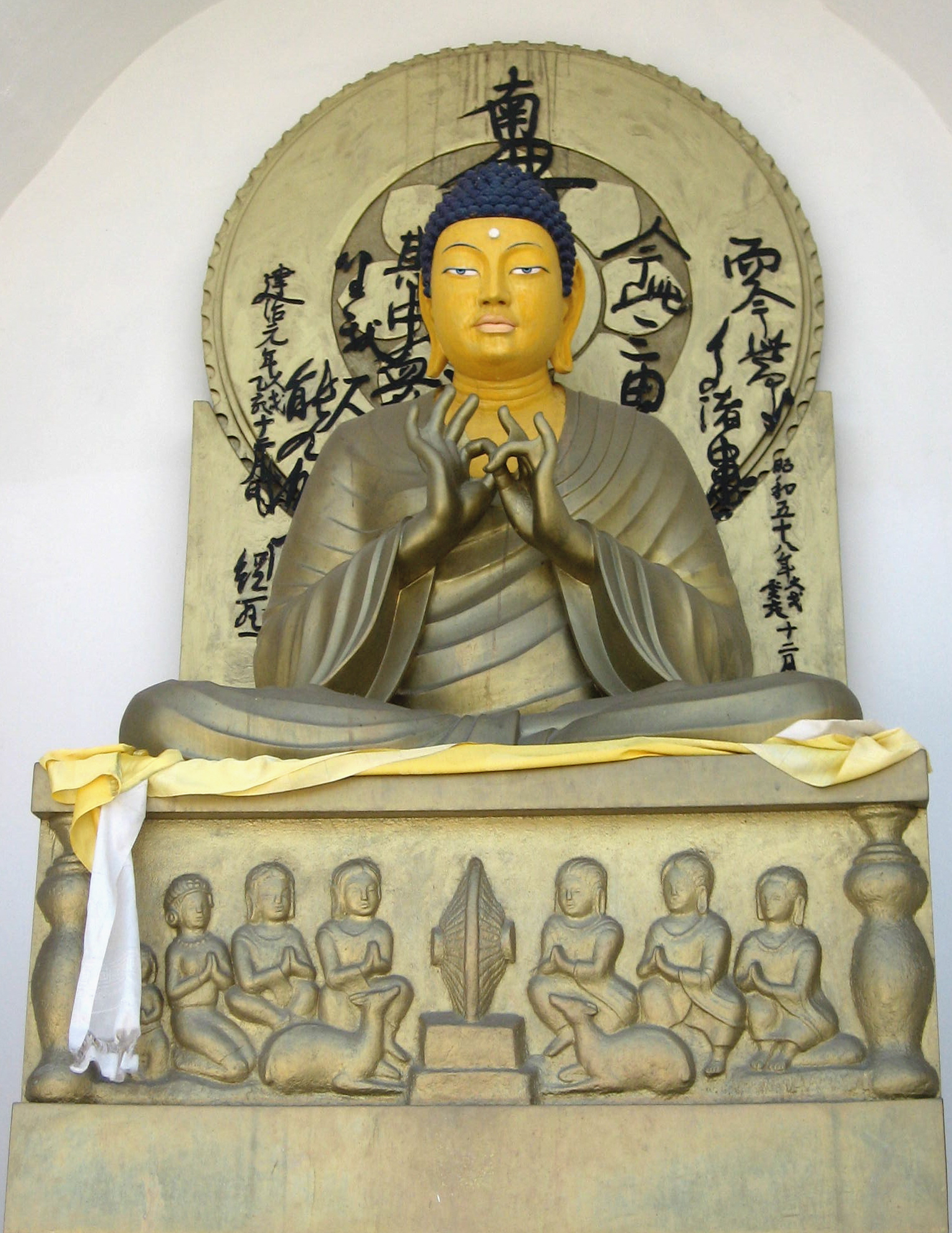
Main Buddha

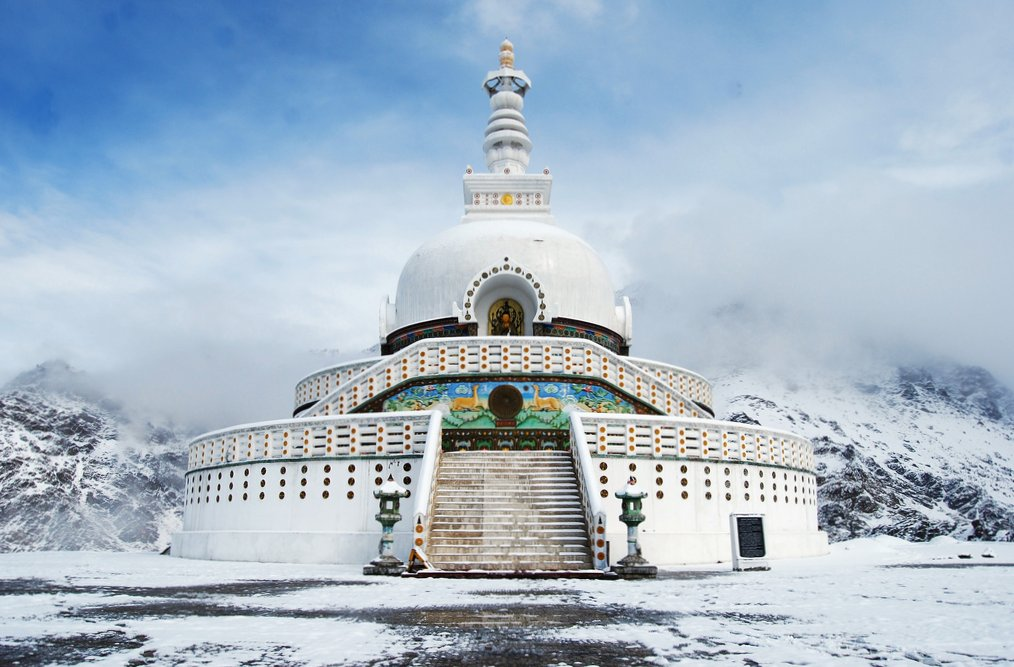
Shanti Stupa in winter

The Shanti Stupa features the photograph of the Dalai Lama with the relics of the Buddha at its base. The Stupa is built as a two-level structure. The first level features the central reliicc of Dharmachakra with deer on each side. A central golden Buddha image sits on a platform depicting the "turning wheel of Dharma" (Dharmachakra). The second level has reliefs depicting the "birth" of Buddha, the death of Buddha (mahanirvana) and Buddha "defeating the devils" while meditating. Both levels feature a series of smaller meditating Buddha reliefs.

The Shanti Stupa was built to promote world peace and prosperity and to commemorate 2500 years of Buddhism. It is considered a symbol of the ties between the people of Japan and India.

== Tourist attraction ==
Since the time of its inauguration, Shanti Stupa has become a popular tourist attraction. According to The Hindu it is the "most famous tourist attraction" around Leh, though its architectural style is different from the Ladakhi style. The Shanti Stupa overlooks the city of Leh, providing panoramic views of the city, the village of Chanspa, Namgyal Tsemo in the distance and the surrounding mountains. Sunrise and sunset are considered to provide the best views from Shanti Stupa. The Stupa is illuminated with lights at night. The Stupa is open for tourists between 8:00 a.m. and 8:00 p.m.

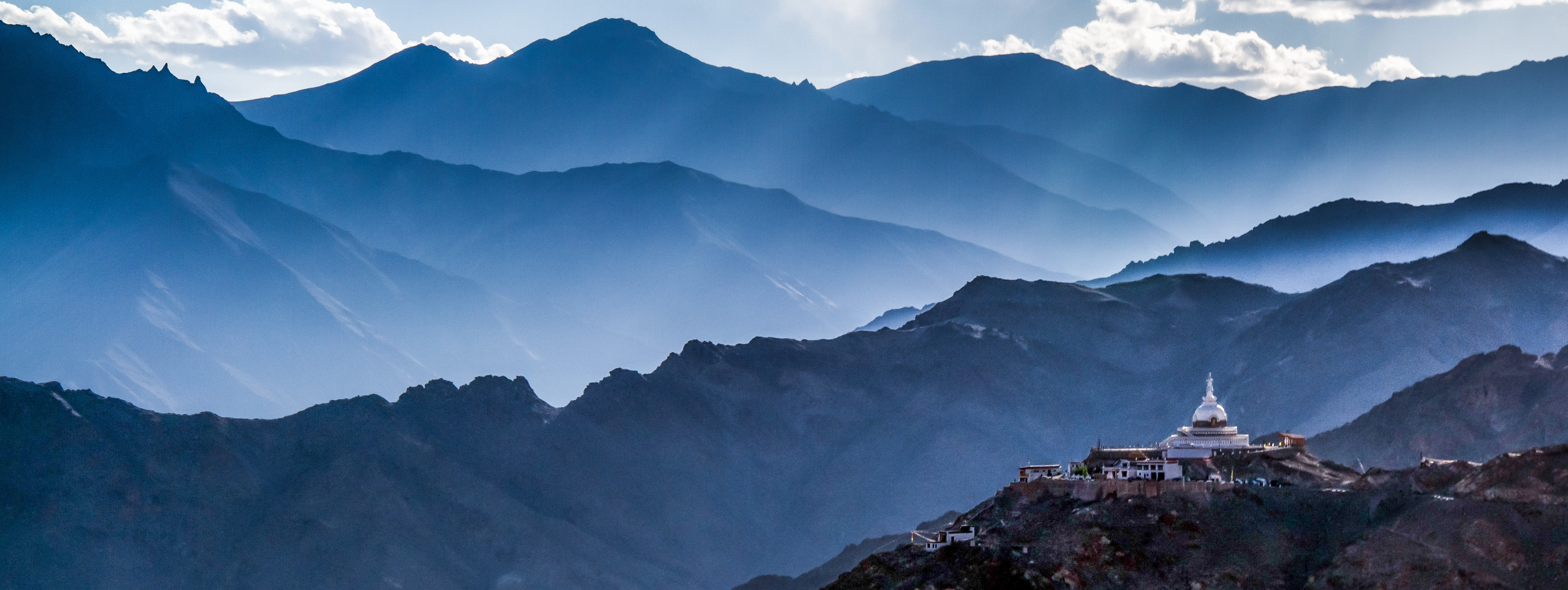
Shanti Stupa, Leh

== Access ==
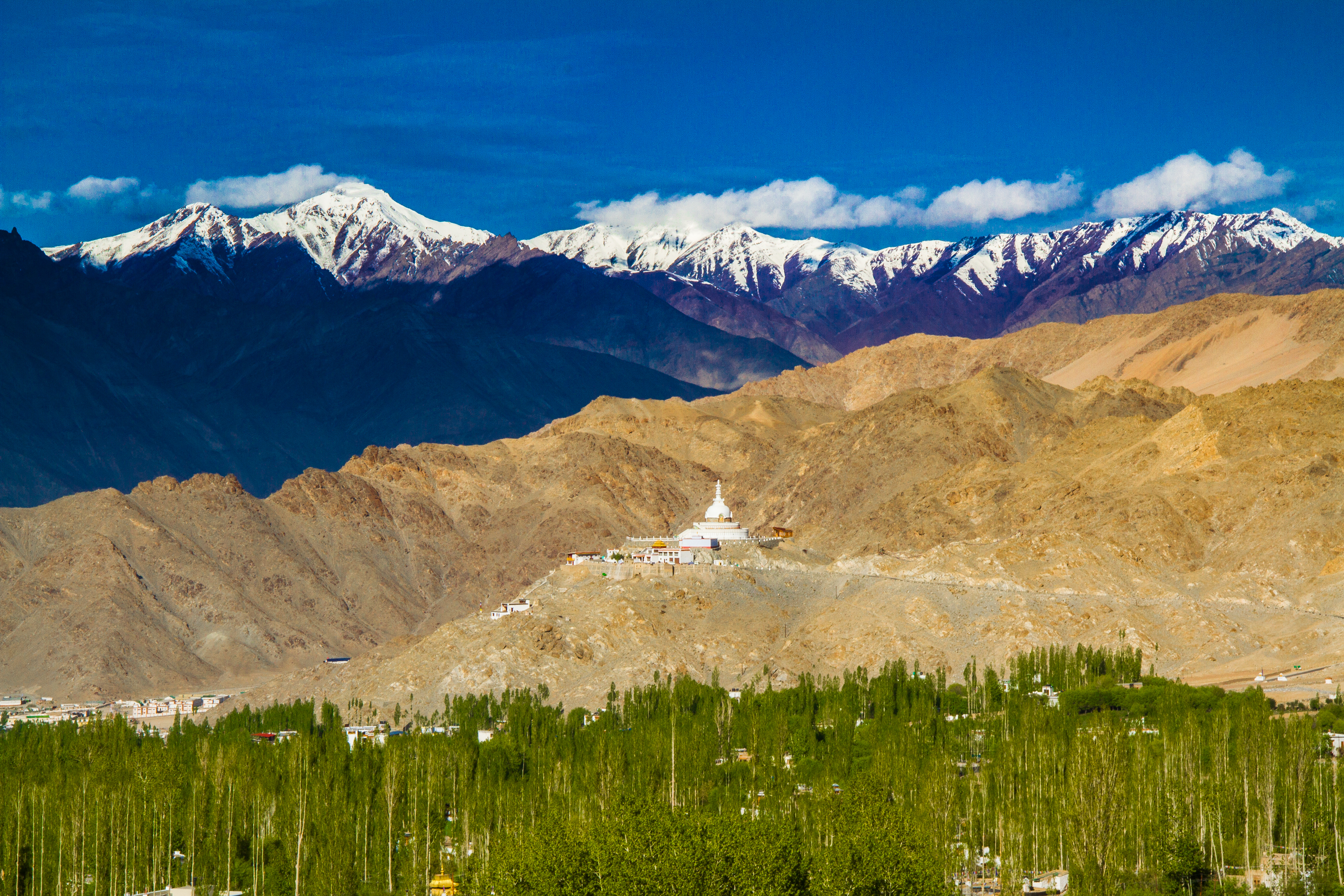
A distant view of Shanti Stupa in Leh

Situated at a height of 3,609 metres (11,841 ft), the Stupa is located 5 kilometres (3.1 mi) from Leh - the former capital of Ladakh - on a steep hill facing the Leh Palace. The Stupa can be reached by a drivable road or on foot using a series of 555 steep steps to the hilltop.

== See also ==
- Peace Pagoda
- Bhikshu Gyomyo Nakamura
