= Supachai Jaisamut =

Thai politician

- ศุภชัย ใจสมุทร
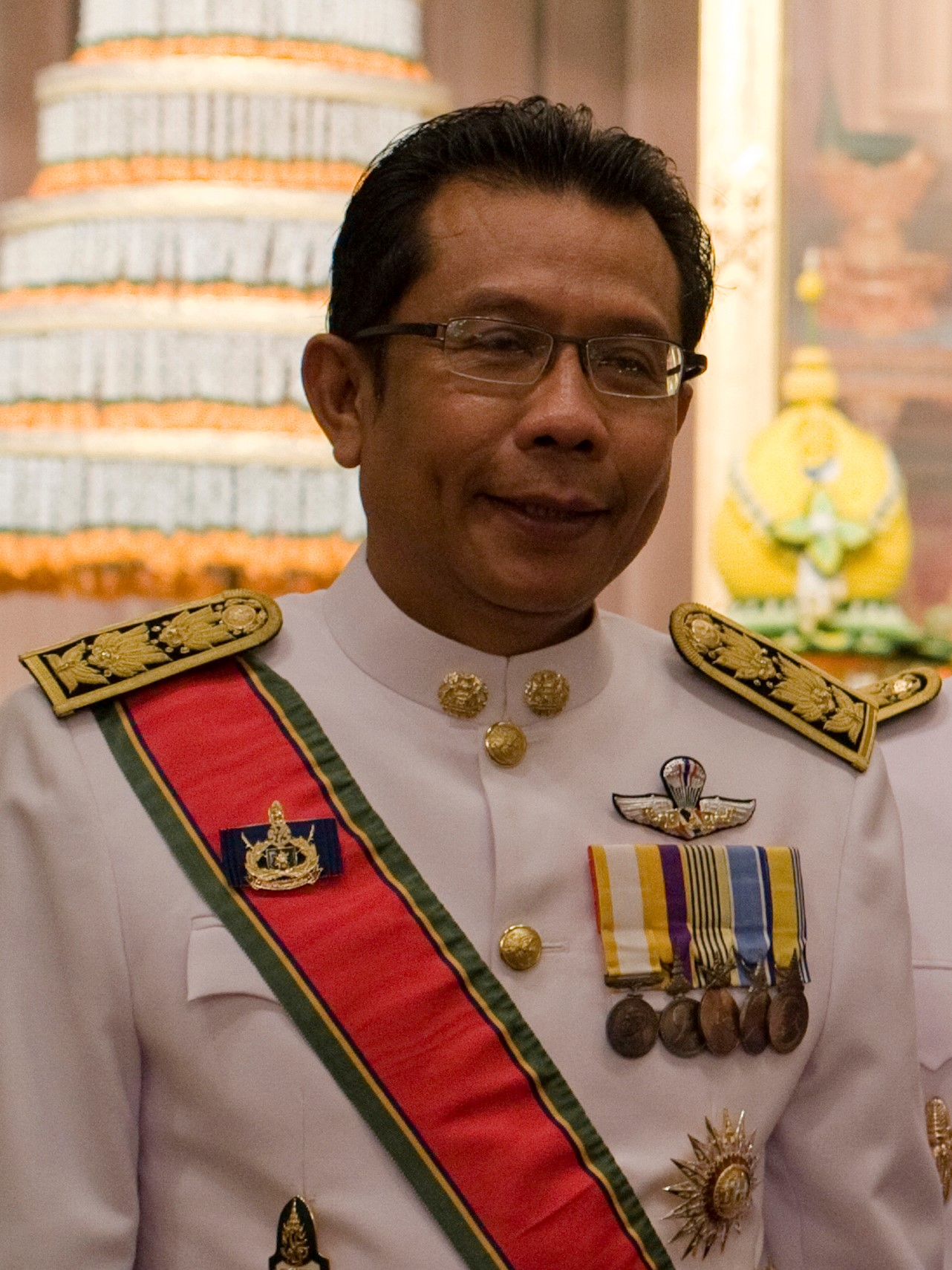

Member of the House of Representatives of Thailand
- Incumbent
- Assumed office 8 February 2026

Supachai Jaisamut (Thai: ศุภชัย ใจสมุทร) is a Thai lawyer and politician, serving as a Member of the House of Representatives for the Bhumjaithai Party since 2026.

== Career ==
Supachai previously served as legal chief for the Bhumjaithai Party.

=== House of Representatives ===
On 1 April 2026, Supachai criticized the Clean Air Bill as redundant, and said "this bill would also grant officials excessive power, allowing them to seize assets and suspend business operations without a court order." Supachai's comments were criticized online and by organizations such as the Thailand Clean Air Network (Thailand CAN), who argue that access to clean air is a human right.
