= Clean Air Bill (Thailand) =

Proposed Thai law

Clean Air Bill (draft)

Parliament of Thailand
- Considered by: House of Representatives

Legislative history
- First reading: 17 January 2024
- Second reading: 21 October 2025
- Third reading: 21 October 2025
- First reading: 27 October 2025
- Status: Pending

The Clean Air Bill (Thai: ร่างพระราชบัญญัติอากาศสะอาด; RTGS: Rang Phra ratchabanyat Akat Sa-at) is a proposed Thai law to introduce comprehensive air quality controls, including addressing pollution sources.

== Background ==
Thailand faces severe air pollution as a result of the burning of agricultural lands, industrial emissions, and transportation.

In 2023, civic groups proposed the Clean Air bill and the Pollutant Release and Transfer Register (PRTR) bill.

On 14 February 2024, environmental groups including the Environmental Law Foundation (EnLaw), Ecological Alert and Recovery (EARTH), and Greenpeace Thailand submitted a draft PRTR bill to parliament. Similar bills have been enacted in 30 countries, which allows access to data on pollution at the local level. The bill requires that polluting businesses list and identify the sources of their emissions.

=== 2025 Bangkok smog ===
In January and February 2025, a period of hazardous air quality in Bangkok has forced the closure of over 350 schools and a voluntary work-from-home scheme, along with restrictions on six-wheel trucks from some parts of the city. Governor of Bangkok Chadchart Sittipunt attributed the pollution to vehicle emissions, trash burning, and seasonal burning of crops. Minister of Transport Suriya Juangroongruangkit announced public transport in Bangkok on the BTS SkyTrain, MRT, light rail, and bus system would be free for a week from 25 January 2025 to reduce pollution.

The smog was cited as underscoring the need for passage of the Clean Air Act.

=== 2026 Chiang Mai smog ===
In March and April 2026, hazardous air quality in Chiang Mai province and Northern Thailand as a result of wildfires led to increased calls for the passaged of the Clean Air Bill. In April 2026, Thailand Development Research Institute (TDRI) chairman Somkiat Tangkitvanich urged the Anutin government to fast track six pieces of key legislation within 60 days of parliament convening, including the Clean Air Bill. Phattarapong Leelaphat, People's Party MP for Chiang Mai, urged the government to state a position on the Bill following a parliamentary debate on PM2.5 earlier in the week.

== Legislative history ==
In November 2023, the Ministry of Natural Resource and Environment (MNRE) proposed a draft Clean Air Act to prevent pollution and reduce government restrictions on pollution control. The bill was posted for public opinion on the MNRE website until 13 November. On 16 November, the bill was passed to the Cabinet Secretariat to gather opinions from state agencies and given to the cabinet on 21 November.

On 28 November 2023, the Srettha cabinet approved seven drafts of the Clean Air Act. One of the draft laws was proposed by the Thailand Clean Air Network (Thailand CAN), a citizen-led initiative that emphasizes the right to clean air as a human rights and environment issue.

=== House of Representatives ===
The House of Representatives approved all seven bills in the first reading. And appointed a Special Committee of 39 members to review and amend the bills before submitting them for the second and third readings.

The seven drafts under consideration are:

1. Draft Clean Air Act (Thai: ร่างพ.ร.บ.เพื่ออากาศสะอาด) proposed by the Cabinet of Thailand
2. Draft Clean Air Act for the People (Thai: ร่างพ.ร.บ.อากาศสะอาดเพื่อประชาชน), proposed by Anutin Charnvirakul, leader of the Bhumjaithai Party
3. Draft Clean Air Act for Fundamental Human Rights (Thai: ร่างพ.ร.บ.อากาศสะอาดเพื่อสิทธิมนุษยชนขั้นพื้นฐาน), proposed by Julapun Amornvivat from the Pheu Thai Party
4. Draft Act on Regulating and Managing Clean Air for Integrated Health (Thai: ร่างพ.ร.บ.กำกับดูแลการจัดการอากาศสะอาดเพื่อสุขภาพแบบบูรณาการ), proposed by Kanongnij Sribuaiam, co-founder of the Thailand CAN, alongside 22,251 voters
5. Draft Act on Management for Clean Air (Thai: ร่างพ.ร.บ.บริหารจัดการเพื่ออากาศสะอาด), proposed by Trinuch Thienthong from the Palang Pracharath Party
6. Draft Act on Promoting and Preserving Air for Health (Thai: ร่างพ.ร.บ.ส่งเสริมและรักษาอากาศเพื่อสุขภาพ), proposed by Romtham Kamnurat from the Democrat Party
7. Draft Act on Toxic Dust and Transboundary Pollution (Thai: ร่างพ.ร.บ.ฝุ่นพิษและการก่อมลพิษข้ามพรมแดน), proposed by Phattharapong Leelapat from the People’s Party

In January 2025, the Strategic Transformation Office's Clean Air Act working group chairman Buntoon Srethasirote expressed confidence the Clean Air Act would be passed by the House of Representatives in April 2025. The government's timeline expects the final draft of the act to be ready by mid-February, and will be forwarded to the House for second and third readings with an expected April passage. Pheu Thai MP Jakkaphon Tangsutthitham, Chair of the Special Commission for the Consideration of the Draft Clean Air Act, described the process as 85% finalized, with the government having consulted stakeholders in the past year.

Following passage in the house, the Senate will have 30 days to review the bill. It is expected to come into effect later in 2025. Subsequently, the meeting approved the bill that had been reviewed and finalized by the Special Committee.

=== Senate ===
The Senate passed the Clean Air Bill in the first reading and appointed a Special Committee of 27 members to review and amend the bill before submitting it for the second and third readings.

The 26th House of Representatives of Thailand was subsequently dissolved by Prime Minister Anutin Charnvirakul on 12 December 2026.

=== Second Anutin cabinet ===
The 27th House of Representatives of Thailand was opened on 8 February 2026. The Second Anutin cabinet must ask parliament to continue consideration of the Clean Air Bill within 60 days of the first sitting, or else the bill will lapse.

Chiang Mai People's Party MP Phattarapong Leelaphat said solutions to air quality should not be politicized, and urged MPs to move forward with the bill as opposed to restarting the legislative process.

In April 2026, Kanongnij Sribuaiam, co-founder of Thailand CAN, said that the Second Anutin cabinet was preparing to block the Clean Air Bill's passage. Kanongnij said that the Network would petition the Parliament for the bill's resubmission.

On 20 April 2026, Prime Minister Anutin reaffirmed his support for the Clean Air Bill. Anutin said the bill was supported by every political party, and was moving to the Senate, where it would be supported by coalition parties.

In May 2026, the bill was passed by the House of Representatives 611-3, and will now move to the Senate.

== Reaction ==
On 1 April, during a House of Representatives meeting Supachai Jaisamut, a Bhumjaithai party-list MP, criticized the bill as potentially damaging Thailand's economy. Supachai's comments were condemned on social media, with critics highlighting the negative health impacts of air pollution, including those suffering from the 2026 Chiang Mai smog.

Thailand CAN responded to Supachai's comments on Facebook, writing that "the question is not whether we should have this law, but how many more years we will allow people to breathe toxic air."

In April 2026, Withoon Lianchamroon, secretary-general of Thai food security and sustainable farming advocacy group Biothai, urged passage of the bill, saying "We have no time to lose. The heavy air pollution in the North might grow worse if there is no effective act to control the pollution at its source."

== See also ==
- Clean Air Act
- Climate Change Bill (Thailand)
- Energy law
