= Anchan Preelert =

Thai former civil servant

Anchan Preelert (Thai: อัญชัญ ปรีเลิศ) is a Thai former civil servant.

== Career ==
=== Royal defamation charges ===
In January 2015, Anchan was arrested by military officers under orders of the ruling military junta led by General Prayut Chan-O-Cha, the National Council for Peace and Order. She spent the following 3 years and 9 months in detention, initially at a military camp in Kanchanaburi and subsequently at Central Women's Correctional Institution, when her case was transferred to the civilian courts.

In 2021, Anchan was convicted of 29 counts of royal defamation under Thailand's lese-majeste law. Each count carried a prison sentence of 3 years, a total of 87 years. After pleading guilty, her sentence was reduced to 43.6 years, the longest sentence yet for violating the lese-majeste law. This was later surpassed by Mongkol Thirakot 50-year sentence for violating the lese majeste law in 2024.

Anchan's sentence was condemned by global human rights groups, including Amnesty International Thailand.

On 26 August 2025, Anchan's lawyers announced she had received a royal pardon and would be released on 27 August 2025, after serving almost 8 years.
