= Climate Change Bill (Thailand) =

Proposed Thai law

Climate Change Act (draft)

Parliament of Thailand
- Territorial extent: Thailand
- Status: Pending

The Climate Change Bill (Thai: ร่างพระราชบัญญัติการเปลี่ยนแปลงสภาพภูมิอากาศ; RTGS: Rang Phra Ratchabanyat Kan Plianplaeng Saphap Phumi-akat) is a proposed Thai law to implement carbon neutrality and net-zero targets.

== Background ==
In 2021, Prime Minister Prayut Chan-o-cha announced Thailand's pans to reduce greenhouse gas emissions at the UN Climate Change Conference in Glasgow (COP26). The plans include reaching carbon neutrality by 2050, and net-zero by 2065.

== Legislative history ==
The bill was drafted based on the 2016 Paris Agreement. In March 2024, the first draft of the bill was announced and expected to be submitted for consideration by the Cabinet of Thailand by June 2024.

On 8 November 2024, the second public consultation for the revised Climate Change Bill was launched by the Department of Climate Change and Environment, under the Ministry of Natural Resources and Environment.

In December 2024, the bill was expected to be submitted to Cabinet by January 2025.

On 2 December 2025, the bill was approved in principle by the Anutin Cabinet.

== Provisions ==
The bill will require businesses in major sectors to collect and report data on greenhouse gas emissions to the Office of Natural Resources and Environmental Policy and Planning. The bill also proposes enhanced financial support including soft loans from environmental funds and banks to support investment in green technology.

The bill will establish a carbon tax on certain products, which will be collected by the Excise and Customs departments.

== See also ==
- Clean Air Bill (Thailand)
