= Mongkol Thirakot =

Thai activist

Mongkol Thirakot (Thai: มงคล ถิระโคตร) is a Thai activist.

== Early life and education ==
Mongkol was born and raised in Chiang Rai province.

== Career ==
Mongkol formerly was an online clothing vendor.

=== Royal defamation charges ===
Mongkol went on a hunger strike in support of bail rights for those convicted of lese-majeste and was subsequently arrested in April 2021. He was charged with royal defamation based on a series of Facebook posts made between 2 March and 11 March 2021 that were described as critical of the monarchy.

In January 2024, an appeals court in Chiang Rai sentenced Mongkol to 50 years in prison on charges of violating Section 112 of Thailand's criminal code. This is the longest sentence ever given for Section 112 violations.

In September 2024, the Court of Appeal Region 5 upheld Mongkol's earlier conviction by the Chiang Rai Provincial Court, bringing his total sentence to 54 years and 6 months.
