= Manit Jitchan-Klab =

Thai politician (1938–2025)

Manit Jitchan-Klab (Thai: มานิตย์ จิตต์จันทร์กลับ; 24 June 1938 – 10 December 2025) was a Thai politician.

== Life and career ==
Manit Jitchan-Klab was born on 24 June 1938, and graduated with a Bachelor of Laws from Thammasat University and a Thai Bar Diploma.

He served as the President of the Criminal Court and the Chief Judge of the Supreme Court. Later, in the case of the judicial crisis in 1992, Manit was dismissed from his position as the Chief Judge of the Criminal Court. Later, he was pardoned and returned to the government. After retirement he also served as a special judge and legal advisor of the Thai Rak Thai Party.

In 2006, Manit played a role in criticizing the work of the court. In the case of the Election Commission (EC) General Vassana and in 2007, Manit criticized the work of the Constitutional Judiciary. In deciding the case of dissolution of the Thai Rak Thai Party. After that, Manit became the leader of the National Coalition for Democracy Against Dictatorship (NPDC).

In 2011, he was appointed an Advisor to the Minister of Science and Technology in the government of Yingluck Shinawatra.

Jitchan-Klab died on 10 December 2025, at the age of 87.
