= Thailand Clean Air Network =

- Thailand Clean Air Network for Health Association
- เครือข่ายอากาศสะอาด
- Formation: 27 August 2024; 2 years ago
- Founder: Weenarin Lulitanonda; Kanongnij Sribuaiam; Wirun Limsawart
- Legal status: Nonprofit
- Location: Thailand
- Website: https://thailandcan.net/en

Thailand Clean Air Network (Thailand CAN; Thai: เครือข่ายอากาศสะอาด) or Thailand Clean Air Network for Health Association, is an environmental non-profit association based in Thailand founded by a group of activists and academics to campaign for solutions to air pollution in Thailand.

== History ==
Thailand CAN was initially founded as an informal network by Weenarin Lulitanonda, Kanongnij Sribuaiam, and Wirun Limsawart.

In 2019, Thailand CAN published a white paper outlining air pollution issues and presenting solutions to the public.

On 27 August 2024, Thailand CAN was formally established as a non-profit association as the Thailand Clean Air Network for Health Association.

=== Clean Air Bill ===
In 2021, Thailand CAN submitted a citizen-led version of the Clean Air Bill for consideration by parliament. In 2024, the Cabinet approved seven drafts of the bill in principle, including the draft authored by Thailand CAN.

On 2 April 2026, Thailand CAN issued a statement on Facebook following Bhumjaithai MP Supachai Jaisamut's comments that the Clean Air Bill would be redundant, writing that "the question is not whether we should have this law, but how many more years we will allow people to breathe toxic air."
