= Pollution Control Department =

MNRE (Thailand) dependent department

- กรมควบคุมมลพิษ

Agency overview
- Formed: 4 April 1992
- Jurisdiction: Thailand
- Agency executive: Surin Worakijthamrong, Director-General
- Parent department: Ministry of Natural Resources and Environment

Pollution Control Department (PCD, Thai: กรมควบคุมมลพิษ) is a Thai dependent department of the Ministry of Natural Resources and Environment.

The department is tasked with reducing environmental pollution in Thailand, along with collecting data on pollution levels and sources.

== Leadership ==
| No. | Director-General | Term |
|---|---|---|
| 1 | Nipon Poapongsakorn | 1992–1997 |
| 2 | Sutham Sathienthai | 1997–2000 |
| 3 | Supat Wangwongwatana | 2000–2003 |
| 4 | Sirithan Pairojboriboon | 2003–2007 |
| 5 | Wichian Chantong | 2007–2008 |
| 6 | Supat Wangwongwatana | 2008–2010 |
| 7 | Anond Snidvongs | 2010–2012 |
| 8 | Jatuporn Buruspat | 2012–2014 |
| 9 | Wirot Kirdkham | 2014–2015 |
| 10 | Jatuporn Buruspat | 2015–2017 |
| 11 | Sunanta Mongkolsawat | 2017–2018 |
| 12 | Pinsak Surasawadee | 2018–2019 |
| 13 | Pralong Dumrongthaittach | 2019–2020 |
| 14 | Atthapol Charoenchansa | 2020–2022 |
| 15 | Narin Boonruam | 2022–2023 |
| 16 | Preeyaporn Suwannakes | 2023–2025 |
| 17 | Surin Worakijthamrong | 2025–present |

== History ==
In 2024, the PDC released a pollution control plan for 2025 that aimed to address haze pollution, including targeting forest, agricultural and urban sources.

The PCD operates vehicle checkpoints targeting "black smoke" emissions. In 2021, approximately half of all vehicles stopped by PCD checkpoints exceeded legal exhaust limits. These checkpoints were increased during the 2025 Bangkok smog.

On 1 February 2025, PCD Director-General Preeyaporn Suwannakes announced new measures targeting vehicles emitting black smoke in conjunction with the Traffic Police Division. These measures include mandating vehicle owners fix non-compliant vehicles within 15 days, a decrease from the previous requirement of 30 days. Under the authority of Thailand's Traffic Act and the Environmental Protection Act of 1992, police can now order vehicle owners to rectify excess emissions within the 15-day period.
