= Lim Kimya =

Cambodian and French politician (1951 or 1952 – 2025)

- លឹម គិមយ៉ា

Member of Parliament of Cambodia
- In office 2013–2018

Personal details
- Born: 1951 or 1952
- Died: 7 January 2025 (aged 73) near Wat Bowonniwet Vihara, Bangkok, Thailand
- Party: Cambodia National Rescue (2012–2017)

Lim Kimya (Khmer: លឹម គិមយ៉ា; 1951 or 1952 – 7 January 2025) was a Cambodian and French politician. Lim, a member of the Cambodia National Rescue Party (CNRP), was first elected as a member of parliament in 2013 and served until 2018.

== Killing ==
On 7 January 2025, Lim was killed in Bangkok in a shooting near Wat Bowonniwet Vihara. Both colleagues and Phil Robertson, director of Asia Human Rights Labour Advocates, described the shooting as an assassination. Lim had recently arrived in Bangkok by bus from Siem Reap, Cambodia, with his wife and uncle. The gunman was on a motorcycle.

On 8 January 2025, the Thai Criminal Court issued a warrant for Ekaluck Paenoi, the suspected killer. After a daylong manhunt led by the Metropolitan Police Bureau, a suspect was arrested in Battambang province in Cambodia by local police. The suspect is a 41-year-old Thai national who worked as a motorcycle taxi driver and is a former marine.

On 9 January 2025, the Thai Criminal Court issued an additional warrant for Pich Kimsrin, a Cambodian national, alleging his involvement in Lim's killing. The Metropolitan Police Bureau stated that he had entered Thailand on the same minibus as Lim and had subsequently left the country following the attack.

On 15 January 2025, the Thai Criminal Court issued another arrest warrant for Somwang Bamrungkit, a Thai and Cambodian dual national known in Cambodia as Ly Rotanakraksmey. Somwang is an advisor to Cambodia's former Prime Minister Hun Sen.
