= Bhikshu Gyomyo Nakamura =

Japanese Buddhist monk (born 1954)

Bhikshu Gyomyo Nakamura（中村行明）is a Japanese Buddhist monk, fairytale writer and musician.

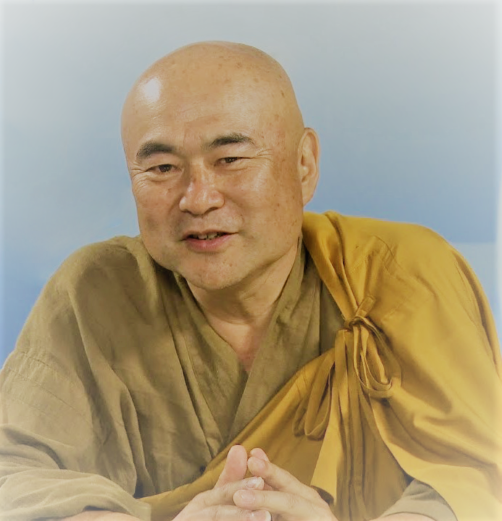
Gyomyo Nakamura

== Early life ==
He was born in Japan on September 9, 1954 in Setagaya, Tokyo. He went Matsubara primary school and when he was 11 years old his family shifted from Setagaya to Kanagawa prefecture. He went Nakatsu primary school and Aikawa Higashi middle school and Atsugi high school and came back to Setagaya and went to Nihon University (College of Art). His father Shohachi Nakamura (1926-2015) was a scholar of Chinese philosophy and honorary professor of Komazawa University and his grandfather Shoji Nakamura (1898-1990) was a folklore historian. During his youth he composed and played music before dropping out of university and travelling to India in February 1976. When he was 21 years old he first arrived in New Delhi and stayed at the Ashoka Mission at the Cambodian Temple. At that time he had a spiritual experience and decided to become a monk. Afterwards he travelled to Nepal, the Himalayan Range and studied Therevada Buddhism in the Ashoka Mission and Tibetan Buddhism at the Library of Tibetan Works & Archives in Dharamshala.

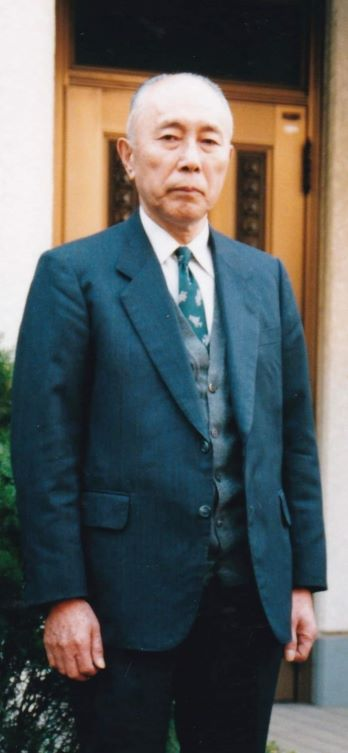
Shohachi Nakamura

== Life ==
Bhikshu Gyomyo Nakamura went to Rajgir in 1977 and he became buddhist monk and studied Japanese Buddhism as well as studying Buddhism in Sri Lanka. He met Fujii Guruji in 1978 in India and he started mission in New Delhi and Ladakh as well as Europe and the US.

Finally he started the construction of a temple in Ladakh in 1983 and completed the temple in 1985. This temple was inaugurated by His Holiness Dalai Lama 14. The Shanti Stupa was completed in 1991. Afterwards he went back to New Delhi and started construction of the World Buddhist Centre in 1993 which was completed in 3 years later in 1996. Bhikshu Gyomyo Nakamura continued spiritual practice in India and started worldwide activities making spiritual harmony between people of different faiths and nationalities.

== Works ==
Bhikshu Gyomyo Nakamura is also an accomplished fairytale writer and musician having published two books "Buddhist Tales for the Soul" and "Buddhist Tales in Modern Times – Stories of the Soul" in English and two books in Japanese. (「たましいの童話集」探究社2004年発行；「わらえる仏教18話」出帆社2009年発行）

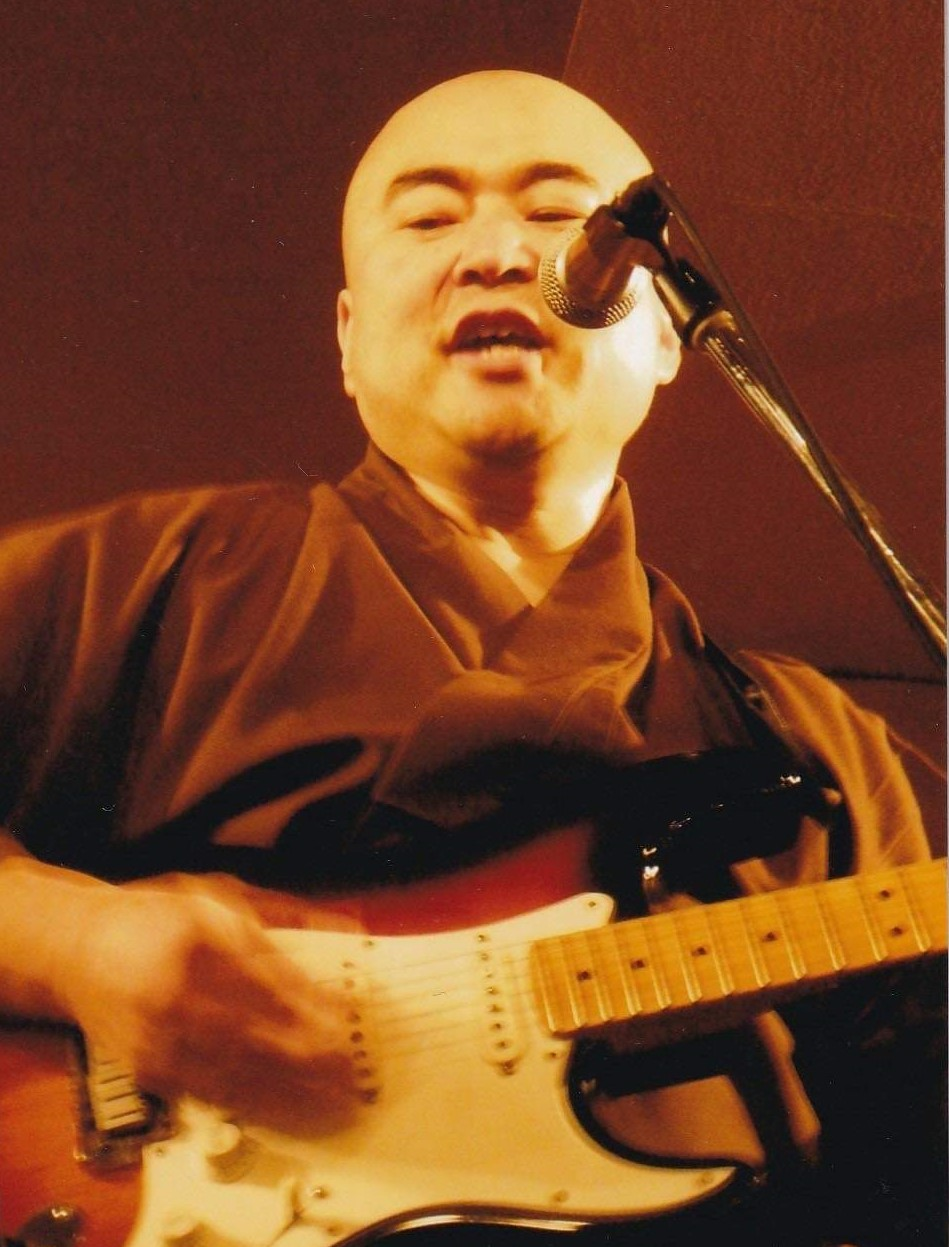
Bhikshu Gyomyo Nakamura

In 2008 Bhikshu Gyomyo Nakamura released his first album entitled "Dharma Songs" with Laura Levin. The main massage of this album is to tell in simple words the Teachings of Buddha and philosophy of Nature.

In 2011 after Tōhoku earthquake and tsunami He released prayer album "3/11" with idea from Western music tradition which has a deep roots in Christianity.

The "Another side of Buddhism" album (2011) expresses the innermost feelings nurtured in the depths of His heart.

== Temple and Shanti stupa ==
In 1985 he built buddhist temples in Ladakh, Northern India and in 1991 he completed the building of the Shanti Stupa, Ladakh. The Shanti Stupa holds the relics of the Buddha at its base, enshrined by the 14th Dalai Lama himself. Shanti stupa has a panoramic view of the surrounding landscape. This has become a primary reason for Shanti Stupa to become a popular tourist attraction, apart from its religious significance.

In 1996 he opened World Buddhist Centre where people come from all over the world. He established main temple building in 2011 which is capable of accommodating over 300 visitors at one time.
