= Sudin Phuyutthanon =

Thai politician (1937–2025)

- สุดิน ภูยุทธานนท์

Member of the House of Representatives of Thailand for Pattani
- In office 22 March 1992 – 27 September 1996
- In office 27 July 1986 – 29 April 1988
- In office 26 January 1975 – 6 October 1976

Personal details
- Born: 20 September 1937 Mueang Pattani district, Siam
- Died: 12 January 2025 (aged 87) Mueang Pattani district, Thailand
- Party: Democrat Party; Justice Unity Party; New Aspiration Party
- Education: Thammasat University (BEc)
- Occupation: Civil servant

Sudin Phuyutthanon (Note: Also spelled Phuyuthanond, Puyuttanont, Phuyuthanont, Phuyutthanont, Puyudhanon, etc.) (Thai: สุดิน ภูยุทธานนท์; 20 September 1937 – 12 January 2025) was a Thai politician. A member of multiple political parties, he served in the House of Representatives from 1975 to 1976, 1986 to 1988, and 1992 to 1996.

Sudin died in Mueang Pattani district on 12 January 2025, at the age of 87.
