= 2025 Bangkok smog =

Air pollution event in Thailand

- Date: 8 January – 24 March 2025
- Location: Central Thailand and the Bangkok Metropolitan Region
- Type: Seasonal air pollution

The 2025 Bangkok smog was an air pollution event affecting Central Thailand and the Bangkok Metropolitan Region from January to March 2025.

== Background ==
Thailand faces persistent air pollution stemming from agricultural burning, industrial emissions, and transportation. Air pollution levels in Bangkok have increased since 2019, following trends of increasing pollution in Northern Thailand. Approximately 60% of the city's air pollution can be traced to transportation, with industrial emissions as the second largest contributor. Agricultural emissions in nearby provinces is likewise a contributor.

Thailand's national standards for PM2.5 air quality were revised in 2022 and 2023, to adopt the World Health Organization (WHO) Interim Target 3 (IT-3) of 37.5 μg/m^{3} and 15 μg/m^{3} for 24 hour and annual measures, respectively. In 2023, over 10 million Thais sought treatment for air pollution-related illnesses.

During annual smog in March 2023, Paetongtarn Shinawatra committed to addressing pollution while campaigning for the Pheu Thai Party.

On 29 January 2025, a panel of medical experts held at Chulalongkorn University urged the government cut the current 24 hour pollution threshold of 37.5 μg/m^{3} to 15 μg/m^{3}, in line with WHO guidelines. These reductions could lead to a 44% decrease in cancer cases in Thailand.

== Smog ==
On 8 January, PM2.5 in Bangkok exceeded acceptable health standards, along with the neighboring provinces of Samut Songkhram, Samut Sakhon, and Nakhon Pathom.

On the morning of 24 January, PM2.5 reached concentrations of 108 μg per cubic metre. According to Swiss-based IQAir, Bangkok was ranked as the city having the world's fourth worst air quality.

On 26 January, greater Bangkok recorded orange levels of PM2.5. Air quality exceeding safety standards in 38 districts in Bangkok, with districts categorized as yellow and orange zones.

On 27 January, air quality slightly improved, with none of Bangkok's districts labeled as red. Governor Chadchart Sittipunt attributed the improvement to strong winds.

On 28 January, air quality continued to improve. Average PM2.5 levels in Bangkok were 26 μg/m^{3}, lower than Thailand's average.

On 31 January, air quality deteriorated and exceeded the safety standard in most areas of the Bangkok metropolitan region. The five districts most impacted were Nong Khaem, Phasi Charoen, Thawi Watthana, Taling Chan, and Khlong Sam Wa.

On 1 February, air quality across all districts reached an orange level.

On 2 February, 64 of Thailand's provinces recorded unsafe PM2.5 levels, including 17 recording red levels (hazardous to health). Bangkok remained at orange level.

On 11 and 12 February, greater Bangkok continued to record unsafe PM2.5 levels.

On 21 March, Bangkok's air quality index was 141, making the city the eight most polluted in the world.

On 24 March, all districts of Bangkok exceeded the safety standards.

== Response ==
=== Cloud seeding ===
On 9 January, the BMA announced it was seeking assistance from the Department of Royal Rainmaking and Agricultural Aviation to conduct cloud seeding operations to reduce pollution in Bangkok. Cloud seeding operations have continued through 27 January.

=== Work-from-home policy ===
On 13 January, Governor of Bangkok Chadchart Sittipunt announced a voluntary work-from home policy. As of 23 January, 100,000 residents had registered for the scheme out of 10 million.

=== Dust free classrooms ===
On 13 January, the city's education department announced plans to create nearly 2,000 "dust free classrooms" for students in kindergarten, including carbon dioxide monitors, ventilation systems, and air conditioning.

=== School closures ===
On 21 January, 21 schools run by the Bangkok Metropolitan Administration were closed.

On 23 January, over 250 schools in Bangkok were closed.

By 24 January, 352 of the 437 schools were closed, the highest number since 2020, when all schools under the BMA were closed due to pollution.

On 27 January, all 437 of BMA administered schools were open.

=== Crop burning bans ===
On 24 January, Minister of Interior Anutin Charnvirakul ordered a ban on the intentional burning of leftover crops. A nationwide burning ban was issued on 30 January that is to last until 3 February.

=== Vehicle emissions checkpoints ===
On 24 January, the Ministry of Transport announced it had installed eight checkpoints in Bangkok for vehicle emissions monitoring. The checkpoints are operated by Pollution Control Department in conjunction with the Land Transport Department, Bangkok Metropolitan Administration and traffic police.

=== Free Bangkok public transit ===
On 24 January, Prime Minister Paetongtarn Shinawatra ordered that public transport in Bangkok would be free for a week starting 25 January until 31 January. Operators including the Bangkok Mass Transit System (BTS Skytrain), Bangkok Expressway and Metro Public Company (MRT), and Bangkok Mass Transit Authority (public buses) will be compensated with an approximately 140 million Baht from the central budget, according to Minister of Transport Suriya Juangroongruangkit.

The plan was criticized by Bhumjaithai MP Korrawee Prissananantakul, who characterized it as a waste of taxpayer money instead of asking the operators to provide free public transport. Environmental experts likewise criticized the plan, noting the money would be better spent on purchasing air purifiers, and noted the government should have been able to anticipate the crisis in advance using modern technology.

=== Flight diversions ===
On January 26, airport visibility at Suvarnabhumi Airport to Don Mueang Airport was impacted by the smog. Several flights were diverted to airports with better visibility, including a scheduled Emirates flight using an Airbus A380 that diverted from Suvarnabhumi Airport to Don Mueang Airport due to heavy smog.

Flights on the Suvarnabhumi-Lampang-Mae Hong Son route were suspended between 15 March and 20 April due to the haze.

=== Hospitality industry ===
Hotels and hostels in Bangkok called on the government to address air quality pollution, noting the potential for a detrimental impact on tourism. A spokesperson for Sukosol Hotels urged the government to pass the Clean Air Act and enforce pollution control measures, while the President of Hostel Thailand Association noted that not all hostels can afford to adopt air purifying systems.

=== Criticism of the Shinawatra government ===
Leader of the Opposition Natthaphong Ruengpanyawut criticized Prime Minister Paetongtarn Shinawatra for attending the World Economic Forum Annual Meeting 2025 in Davos, Switzerland during the crisis. Shinawatra returned to Thailand from Davos on 25 January. Upon her arrival at Suvarnabhumi Airport, she was interviewed and emphasized the regional nature of air pollution in Southeast Asia, while acknowledging Thailand contributed to the problem. The BMA opened public-health emergency response centre.

== See also ==
- Clean Air Act (Thailand)
