= 2023 Thai House of Representatives =

26th House of Representatives of Thailand
←	25th	27th	→
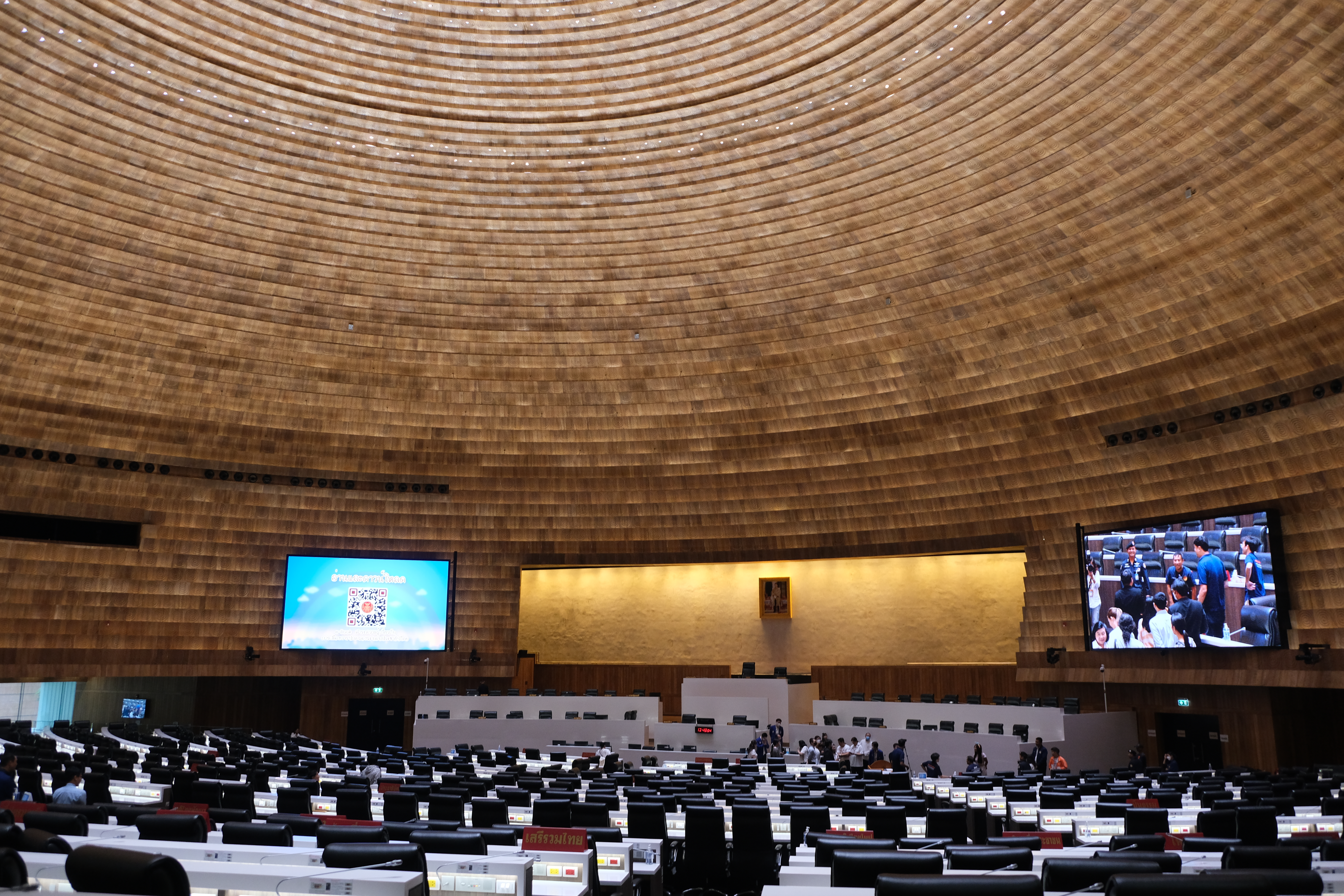
- Phra Suriyan Chamber, Sappaya-Sapasathan

Overview
- Legislative body: National Assembly of Thailand
- Meeting place: Sappaya-Sapasathan
- Term: 14 May 2023 – 12 December 2025
- Election: 2023 Thai general election
- Government: Srettha cabinet (until 3 September 2024); Paetongtarn cabinet (until 19 September 2025); First Anutin cabinet (since 19 September 2025)

House of Representatives
- Members: 500
- Speaker: Wan Muhamad Noor Matha
- First Deputy Speaker: Padipat Suntiphada (until 7 August 2024); Pichet Chuamuangpan (until 1 August 2025); Chaiya Promma (since 10 August 2025)
- Second Deputy Speaker: Pichet Chuamuangpan (until 10 September 2024); Paradorn Prissananantakul (until 19 June 2025); Chalat Khamchuang (since 28 July 2025)
- Prime Minister: Srettha Thavisin (until 14 August 2024); Paetongtarn Shinawatra (until 29 August 2025); Anutin Charnvirakul (since 7 September 2025)
- Leader of the Opposition: Chaithawat Tulathon (until 7 August 2024); Natthaphong Ruengpanyawut (since 25 September 2024)

Monarch Vajiralongkorn

Sessions
- 1st: 3 July 2023 – 30 October 2023
- 2nd: 12 December 2023 – 9 April 2024
- 3rd: 3 July 2024 – 30 October 2024
- 4th: 12 December 2024 – 10 April 2025
- 5th: 3 July 2025 – 30 October 2025

Special sessions
- 1st: 18 June 2024 – 21 June 2024
- 2nd: 28 May 2025 – 31 May 2025
- 3rd: 10 December 2025 – 11 December 2025

The House of Representatives of Thailand of 2023 consists of 500 members elected in the 14 May 2023 general election, who, together with 250 members of the appointed Senate, form the National Assembly of Thailand. It is the second parliament to be convened in accordance with the 2017 constitution of Thailand, which followed the 2014 military coup.

Parliament was officially opened by King Vajiralongkorn on 3 July 2023. The Speaker of the House was elected the following day.

== Major events ==
- On 7 August 2024, the Constitutional Court of Thailand ordered the dissolution of the Move Forward Party on the grounds that its advocacy for reforms of Thailand's lèse-majesté laws constituted an attempt to overthrow the constitutional monarchy, which also included five of its MPs being banned from politics. Following the dissolution, all of the remaining 143 MPs joined Thinkakhao Chaovilai. Meetings were then held to elect new party executives, with Natthaphong Ruengpanyawut being elected its new leader and the name was changed to the People's Party (PPLE) on 9 August 2024.
- Part of the dissolution ruling included a 10-year ban of party executives from politics. While no longer a part of the party, this included First Deputy Speaker Padipat as he had been Move Forward party executive during the period covered by the ruling. He was replaced by second deputy speaker Pichet Chuamuangphan from Pheu Thai party as first deputy speaker.
- On 19 June 2025, Paradorn Prissananantakul of Bhumjaithai party become second deputy speaker. He resigned from his post following the departure of Bhumjaithai party from the coalitions government.
- On 3 July 2025, the People's Party officially welcomed the Bhumjaithai Party into the opposition bloc in parliament. Leaders of five opposition parties, including People's Party leader Natthaphong Ruengpanyawut and Bhumjaithai leader Anutin Charnvirakul, held their first joint meeting of the new parliamentary session. Bhumjaithai leader Anutin Charnvirakul vowed that his party would "fully scrutinise the government" in its new role as an opposition party.

== House of Representatives composition ==
The Move Forward Party and Pheu Thai Party jointly won a landslide victory in the 2023 election.

=== Constituencies ===
==== Bangkok Metropolitan ====
People's (58) Chart Thai Pattana (3) Pheu Thai (2) United Thai Nation (1) Thai Progress (1)

District	Elected MP	Party	Notes
Bangkok 1	Paramait Vithayaruksun	People's	
Bangkok 2	Tisana Choonhavan	People's	
Bangkok 3	Chorayuth Chaturapornprasit	People's	
Bangkok 4	Bhuntin Noumjerm	People's	
Bangkok 5	Chalernchai Kulalert	People's	
Bangkok 6	Kantapon Duangamporn	People's	
Bangkok 7	Patsarin Ramwong	People's	
Bangkok 8	Chayaphon Satondee	People's	
Bangkok 9	Suphanat Minchainant	People's	
Bangkok 10	Ekkarach Udomumnuay	People's	
Bangkok 11	Sasinan Thamnithinan	People's	
Bangkok 12	Puriwat Chaisamran	People's	
Bangkok 13	Tanadej Pengsuk	People's	
Bangkok 14	Sirinpat Kongtrakarn	People's	
Bangkok 15	Vittawat Tichawanich	People's	
Bangkok 16	Pimkarn Kiratiwirapakorn	People's	
Bangkok 17	Weerawut Rukthieng	People's	
Bangkok 18	Teerajchai Phuntumas	People's	
Bangkok 19	Kanphong Prayoonsak	People's	
Bangkok 20	Theerarat Samrejvanich	Pheu Thai	
Bangkok 21	Nuttapong Premphunsawad	People's	
Bangkok 22	Supakon Tangtiphaiboontana	People's	
Bangkok 23	Piyarat Jongthep	People's	
Bangkok 24	Taopiphop Limjittrakorn	People's	
Bangkok 25	Annsiri Walaikanok	People's	
Bangkok 26	Chaiyampawan Manpianchit	Thai Progress	Expelled from Move Forward Party in 2023 for alleged sexual misconduct
Bangkok 27	Nattacha Boonchaiinsawat	People's	
Bangkok 28	Rukchanok Srinok	People's	
Bangkok 29	Tisarat Laohapon	People's	
Bangkok 30	Thunyatorn Thaninwattanatorn	People's	
Bangkok 31	Sirin Sangaunsin	People's	
Bangkok 32	Pawitra Jittakit	People's	
Bangkok 33	Pongpan Yodmuangjaroen	People's	
Nakhon Pathom 1	Supachok Srisukajon	Chart Thai Pattana	
Nakhon Pathom 2	Sinthop Kaewpijit	United Thai Nation	
Nakhon Pathom 3	Panuwat Sasomsub	Chart Thai Pattana	
Nakhon Pathom 4	Kittipon Panprommat	People's	
Nakhon Pathom 5	Anucha Sasomsub	Chart Thai Pattana	
Nakhon Pathom 6	Chitsanupong Tangmetakun	People's	
Nonthaburi 1	Surapan Waiyakorn	People's	
Nonthaburi 2	Panyarat Nantaphusitanon	People's	
Nonthaburi 3	Anusorn Keawwichien	People's	
Nonthaburi 4	Noppon Tippayachon	People's	
Nonthaburi 5	Preedee Charoensin	People's	
Nonthaburi 6	Kunakorn Munnateerai	People's	
Nonthaburi 7	Kiatikun Tonyang	People's	
Nonthaburi 8	Non Paisanlimcharoenkit	People's	
Pathum Thani 1	Supawee Supapanittra	People's	
Pathum Thani 2	Jessada Dontrisanah	People's	
Pathum Thani 3	Chonticha Changriew	People's	
Pathum Thani 4	Sakon Suntornwanitkit	People's	
Pathum Thani 5	Manasanan Leenawarat	Pheu Thai	
Pathum Thani 6	Chetawan Thuaprakhon	People's	
Pathum Thani 7	Prasit Pattamapadungsak	People's	
Samut Prakan 1	Panida Mongkonsawat	People's	
Samut Prakan 2	Ratchanok Sukprasert	People's	
Samut Prakan 3	Pichai Changjanyawong	People's	
Samut Prakan 4	Wuttinan Boonchoo	People's	
Samut Prakan 5	Nittaya Meesri	People's	
Samut Prakan 6	Weerapat Kantha	People's	
Samut Prakan 7	Boonlert Saengpan	People's	
Samut Prakan 8	Traiwan Eiamjai	People's	
Samut Sakhon 1	Nattapon Sumanotham	People's	
Samut Sakhon 2	Sirirot Tanikkun	People's	
Samut Sakhon 3	Sirasit Songnui	People's	

==== Central ====
Bhumjaithai (16) Pheu Thai (14) Palang Pracharath (9) People's (6) Chart Thai Pattana (5) Kla Tham (3) United Thai Nation (3) Chart Pattana (1)

District	Elected MP	Party	Notes
Ang Thong 1	Paradorn Prissananantakul	Bhumjaithai	
Ang Thong 2	Kornwee Prissananantakul	Bhumjaithai	
Chainat 1	Anucha Nakasai	United Thai Nation	
Chainat 2	Montian Songpracha	Bhumjaithai	
Kamphaeng Phet 1	Pai Leeke	Kla Tham	
Kamphaeng Phet 2	Petchpoom Aponrat	Kla Tham	
Kamphaeng Phet 3	Anun Ponumnuay	Palang Pracharath	
Kamphaeng Phet 4	Parinya Roekrai	Palang Pracharath	
Lopburi 1	Sittichai Loprasongsuk	Pheu Thai	
Lopburi 2	Satit Taveebhol	People's	
Lopburi 3	Mallika Jirapunvanit	Bhumjaithai	
Lopburi 4	Narin Klangpha	Bhumjaithai	
Lopburi 5	Worawong Worapanya	Pheu Thai	
Nakhon Nayok 1	Suraphon Boonima	Pheu Thai	
Nakhon Nayok 2	Kriangkrai Kittithanesuan	Pheu Thai	
Nakhon Sawan 1	Krit Hiran Lert Urit Phakdi	People's	
Nakhon Sawan 2	Songsak Songsermudomchai	Pheu Thai	
Nakhon Sawan 3	Sanya Ninsupan	United Thai Nation	
Nakhon Sawan 4	Manop Sriphueng	Bhumjaithai	
Nakhon Sawan 5	Peeradej Sirivansan	Bhumjaithai	
Nakhon Sawan 6	Prasart Tanprasert	Chart Pattana	
Phetchabun 1	Pimporn Pornputhipant	Palang Pracharath	
Phetchabun 2	Jakarat Puachuay	Palang Pracharath	
Phetchabun 3	Boonchai Kittitharasup	Palang Pracharath	
Phetchabun 4	Wanpen Promphat	Palang Pracharath	
Phetchabun 5	Worachot Sukhonkajorn	Palang Pracharath	
Phetchabun 6	Iam Tongjaisod	Palang Pracharath	
Phichit 1	Pattarapong Phataraprasit	Bhumjaithai	
Phichit 2	Winai Phataraprasit	Bhumjaithai	
Phichit 3	Siriwat Khajonprasart	Bhumjaithai	
Phitsanulok 1	Jadet Jantar	Pheu Thai	Won by-election on 22 September 2024
Phitsanulok 2	Noppol Leuangthongnara	Pheu Thai	
Phitsanulok 3	Pongmanu Thongnak	United Thai Nation	
Phitsanulok 4	Pimpiccha Chai Supakit Charoen	Pheu Thai	
Phitsanulok 5	Supapakorn Kityathikun	People's	
Phra Nakhon Si Ayutthaya 1	Thawiwong Tothaviwong	People's	
Phra Nakhon Si Ayutthaya 2	Charin Wongpanthieng	People's	
Phra Nakhon Si Ayutthaya 3	Pimprueda Tanjararak	Bhumjaithai	
Phra Nakhon Si Ayutthaya 4	Surasak Phancharoenworakul	Bhumjaithai	
Phra Nakhon Si Ayutthaya 5	Pradit Sangkhai	Bhumjaithai	
Saraburi 1	Sorapatch Sriprach	People's	
Saraburi 2	Atthaphon Wongprayoon	Pheu Thai	
Saraburi 3	Watcharapong Kuwijitsuwan	Bhumjaithai	
Saraburi 4	Ongart Wongprayoon	Kla Tham	
Sing Buri 1	Chotiwut Thanakamanusorn	Palang Pracharath	
Sukhothai 1	Punsiri Kullanartsiri	Pheu Thai	
Sukhothai 2	Choosak Keereemasthong	Pheu Thai	
Sukhothai 3	Prapaporn Thongpaknam	Pheu Thai	
Sukhothai 4	Jawanchai Chaiwiratnukul	Pheu Thai	
Suphan Buri 1	Sorachud Suchitta	Chart Thai Pattana	
Suphan Buri 2	Nuttavood Prasertsuvan	Chart Thai Pattana	
Suphan Buri 3	Noppadol Matsri	Chart Thai Pattana	
Suphan Buri 4	Samerkun Thiengtham	Chart Thai Pattana	
Suphan Buri 5	Prapat Pothasuthon	Chart Thai Pattana	
Uthai Thani 1	Jeset Thaised	Bhumjaithai	
Uthai Thani 2	Chada Thaised	Bhumjaithai	

==== Eastern ====
People's (16) Pheu Thai (4) Bhumjaithai (2) Kla Tham (3) Palang Pracharath (2) Chart Pattana (1) United Thai Nation (1) Independent (1)

District	Elected MP	Party	Notes
Chachoengsao 1	Thitima Chaisaeng	Pheu Thai	
Chachoengsao 2	Atthakorn Sirilattyakorn	Kla Tham	
Chachoengsao 3	Sakchai Tancharoen	Pheu Thai	
Chachoengsao 4	Jirat Thongsuwan	People's	
Chanthaburi 1	Warayut Thongsuk	People's	
Chanthaburi 2	Prachyawan Chaisueb	People's	
Chanthaburi 3	Yanathicha Buapuean	People's	
Chonburi 1	Worat Sirirak	People's	
Chonburi 2	Wannida Nophasit	People's	
Chonburi 3	Chawan Phonchai	People's	
Chonburi 4	Jirawut Singtothong	United Thai Nation	
Chonburi 5	Anan Pridasutthichit	Pheu Thai	
Chonburi 6	Krit Cheewathamanont	Kla Tham	Left the People's Party in 2025
Chonburi 7	Sahatsawat Koomkong	People's	
Chonburi 8	Charus Koomkainam	People's	
Chonburi 9	Yodchai Puengporn	People's	
Chonburi 10	Sathira Phuakpraphun	Kla Tham	
Prachinburi 1	Amnat Vilawan	Bhumjaithai	
Prachinburi 2	Wuthipong Thonglao	Chart Pattana	Expelled from the party for sexual harassment
Prachinburi 3	Salit Butnain	Bhumjaithai	
Rayong 1	Kamonthat Kitti Sunthornsakul	People's	
Rayong 2	Krit Silpachai	People's	
Rayong 3	Pongsathorn Sornphetnarin	People's	By-election held on 10 September 2023
Rayong 4	Chutipong Phiphoppinyo	People's	
Rayong 5	Sawangchit Lao Harojanphan	People's	
Sa Kaeo 1	Tarnis Thienthong	Palang Pracharath	
Sa Kaeo 2	Treenuch Thienthong	Palang Pracharath	
Sa Kaeo 3	Sorawong Thienthong	Pheu Thai	
Trat 1	Sakdinai Numnu	People's	

==== Northeastern ====
Pheu Thai (72) Bhumjaithai (35) People's (8) Thai Sang Thai (5) Palang Pracharath (4) Kla Tham (4) Democrat (2) Thai Ruam Palang (2) Chart Thai Pattana (1)

District	Elected MP	Party	Notes
Amnat Charoen 1	Suksomruay Wantaneekul	Bhumjaithai	
Amnat Charoen 2	Yaneenat Khemnak	Bhumjaithai	
Bueng Kan 1	Siam Penthong	Bhumjaithai	
Bueng Kan 2	Ornuma Boonsiri	Bhumjaithai	Won by-election on 30 March 2025
Bueng Kan 3	Niphon Khonkhayan	Pheu Thai	
Buriram 1	Sanong Thep-aksornnarong	Bhumjaithai	
Buriram 2	Chaichanok Chidchob	Bhumjaithai	
Buriram 3	Adipong Thitipitaya	Bhumjaithai	
Buriram 4	Rungsikron Timataruka	Bhumjaithai	
Buriram 5	Sophon Zaram	Bhumjaithai	
Buriram 6	Sak Zaram	Bhumjaithai	
Buriram 7	Pornchai Srisuriyayothin	Bhumjaithai	
Buriram 8	Trithep Ngamgamol	Bhumjaithai	
Buriram 9	Rungrot Thongsri	Bhumjaithai	
Buriram 10	Jakkrid Thongsri	Bhumjaithai	
Chaiyaphum 1	Ochit Kiatkongchuchai	Pheu Thai	
Chaiyaphum 2	Cherngchai Chaleerin	Pheu Thai	
Chaiyaphum 3	Samrit Thaensap	Bhumjaithai	
Chaiyaphum 4	Kanchana Ruang	Palang Pracharath	
Chaiyaphum 5	Siva Pongteeradul	Pheu Thai	
Chaiyaphum 6	Chawengsak Rengpaiboonwong	Bhumjaithai	
Chaiyaphum 7	Akarasankiri Lohweera	Kla Tham	
Kalasin 1	Wirat Pimpanit	Pheu Thai	
Kalasin 2	Palakorn Pimpanit	Pheu Thai	
Kalasin 3	Chamlong Poonwanata	Kla Tham	
Kalasin 4	Prapa Hengpaiboon	Bhumjaithai	
Kalasin 5	Thinphol Sritares	Pheu Thai	
Kalasin 6	Prasert Bunruang	Pheu Thai	
Khon Kaen 1	Weeranan Huadsri	People's	
Khon Kaen 2	Itthiphol Chontarasiri	People's	
Khon Kaen 3	Chatchawan Apirakmankong	People's	
Khon Kaen 4	Ekkarat Changlao	Kla Tham	
Khon Kaen 5	Phakawat Srisurapol	Pheu Thai	
Khon Kaen 6	Singhaphon Deenang	Pheu Thai	
Khon Kaen 7	Surapot Taochareonsuk	Pheu Thai	
Khon Kaen 8	Wipanee Phukamwong	Pheu Thai	
Khon Kaen 9	Saratsanun Unnopporn	Pheu Thai	
Khon Kaen 10	Wanniwat Somboon	Pheu Thai	
Khon Kaen 11	Ongart Chatchaipolrat	Bhumjaithai	
Loei 1	Lertsak Pattanachaikul	Pheu Thai	
Loei 2	Saran Timsuwan	Pheu Thai	
Loei 3	Thanayose Thimsuwan	Bhumjaithai	
Loei 4	Somjate Sangcharoenrat	Pheu Thai	
Maha Sarakham 1	Kittisak Kanasawat	Pheu Thai	
Maha Sarakham 2	Chaiwattana Tinarat	Pheu Thai	
Maha Sarakham 3	Latthachai Chokchaiwatakorn	Bhumjaithai	
Maha Sarakham 4	Sanphaphanyu Siripil	Pheu Thai	
Maha Sarakham 5	Jirawat Siripanich	Pheu Thai	
Maha Sarakham 6	Rat Klangsaeng	Pheu Thai	
Mukdahan 1	Wiriya Thongpha	Palang Pracharath	
Mukdahan 2	Nakorn Chareephan	People's	
Nakhon Phanom 1	Phumiphat Phacharasap	Pheu Thai	
Nakhon Phanom 2	Manaporn Chareonsri	Pheu Thai	
Nakhon Phanom 3	Alongkot Maneekart	Bhumjaithai	
Nakhon Phanom 4	Chukan Kulwongsa	Bhumjaithai	
Nakhon Ratchasima 1	Chat Suphatvanich	People's	
Nakhon Ratchasima 2	Piyachart Ruchipornwasin	People's	
Nakhon Ratchasima 3	Suttasit Potthasak	People's	
Nakhon Ratchasima 4	Natjira Immwiset	Pheu Thai	
Nakhon Ratchasima 5	Somkiat Tandiloktrakul	Pheu Thai	
Nakhon Ratchasima 6	Kosol Pattama	Pheu Thai	
Nakhon Ratchasima 7	Piyanuch Yindeesuk	Pheu Thai	
Nakhon Ratchasima 8	Nikorn Somklang	Pheu Thai	
Nakhon Ratchasima 9	Polpee Suwanchawee	Bhumjaithai	
Nakhon Ratchasima 10	Aphicha Loedphacharakamon	Pheu Thai	
Nakhon Ratchasima 11	Arthit Wangsuphakitkosol	Pheu Thai	
Nakhon Ratchasima 12	Noraset Sirirojanaku	Pheu Thai	
Nakhon Ratchasima 13	Patchara Chanruangthong	Pheu Thai	
Nakhon Ratchasima 14	Sirasit Lertduailap	Pheu Thai	
Nakhon Ratchasima 15	Rachata Dankul	Pheu Thai	
Nakhon Ratchasima 16	Pornthep Sirirojanakul	Pheu Thai	
Nong Bua Lamphu 1	Siam Hathasongkorh	Pheu Thai	
Nong Bua Lamphu 2	Chaiya Promma	Pheu Thai	
Nong Bua Lamphu 3	Naphol Cheykhamhaeng	Pheu Thai	
Nong Khai 1	Krasae Trakulpornpong	Palang Pracharath	
Nong Khai 2	Chanok Chanthathong	Pheu Thai	
Nong Khai 3	Ekthanad Inrod	Pheu Thai	
Roi Et 1	Anurak Chureemas	Chart Thai Pattana	
Roi Et 2	Chalard Kharmchaung	Pheu Thai	
Roi Et 3	Ratchanee Phonsue	Kla Tham	
Roi Et 4	Narakorn Namuangruk	Pheu Thai	
Roi Et 5	Jiraporn Sindhuprai	Pheu Thai	
Roi Et 6	Kitti Somsub	Pheu Thai	
Roi Et 7	Chatchawan Phatayathai	Thai Sang Thai	
Roi Et 8	Chayapa Sinthuprai	Pheu Thai	
Sisaket 1	Thanet Kruearat	Pheu Thai	
Sisaket 2	Surachart Charnpradit	Pheu Thai	
Sisaket 3	Thana Kitpaiboonchai	Bhumjaithai	
Sisaket 4	Phumin Leeteeraprasert	Pheu Thai	
Sisaket 5	Amornthep Sommai	Pheu Thai	Died on 27 June 2025
Sisaket 5	Jintawan Trisaranakul	Bhumjaithai	By-election on 28 September 2025
Sisaket 6	Werapon Jitsumrit	Pheu Thai	
Sisaket 7	Wilda Inchat	Pheu Thai	
Sisaket 8	Arsphol Suntraiphop	Bhumjaithai	
Sisaket 9	Nuchanart Jaruwongsathien	Pheu Thai	
Sakon Nakhon 1	Abhichart Tiraswasdichai	Pheu Thai	
Sakon Nakhon 2	Chatri Laprom	Democrat	
Sakon Nakhon 3	Jiratchaya Supso	Pheu Thai	
Sakon Nakhon 4	Pattana Sapso	Pheu Thai	
Sakon Nakhon 5	Chaimongkol Chairob	Palang Pracharath	
Sakon Nakhon 6	Sakuna Saranun	Pheu Thai	
Sakon Nakhon 7	Kasem Upara	Pheu Thai	
Surin 1	Pakorn Mungcharoenporn	Bhumjaithai	
Surin 2	Chuchai Mungcharoenporn	Pheu Thai	
Surin 3	Pakamas Charoenphan	Bhumjaithai	
Surin 4	Pornthep Poonsrithanakul	Pheu Thai	
Surin 5	Kroomanit Sangpoom	Pheu Thai	
Surin 6	Lumpert Puapattanachote	Bhumjaithai	
Surin 7	Rueangwit Koonwatanapong	Bhumjaithai	
Surin 8	Patida Tantiratnanon	Bhumjaithai	
Ubon Ratchathani 1	Worasit Kantinan	Pheu Thai	
Ubon Ratchathani 2	Wuttipong Nambutr	Democrat	
Ubon Ratchathani 3	Pimpakarn Polsamak	Thai Ruam Palang	
Ubon Ratchathani 4	Kittunya Wajadee	Pheu Thai	
Ubon Ratchathani 5	Suthichai Charoonnet	Bhumjaithai	
Ubon Ratchathani 6	Thantharee Suntaphan	Pheu Thai	
Ubon Ratchathani 7	Sudarat Phitakpornphanlop	Bhumjaithai	
Ubon Ratchathani 8	Boonthida Somchai	Bhumjaithai	
Ubon Ratchathani 9	Rampoon Tantiwanichanont	Thai Sang Thai	
Ubon Ratchathani 10	Somsak Boonprachom	Thai Ruam Palang	
Ubon Ratchathani 11	Tuangthip Jintawet	Bhumjaithai	
Udon Thani 1	Nattapong Pipatchaisiri	People's	
Udon Thani 2	Hathairat Petchpanomporn	Pheu Thai	
Udon Thani 3	Rang Thurapon	Thai Sang Thai	
Udon Thani 4	Panu Pornwattana	Pheu Thai	
Udon Thani 5	Kornwee Sarakham	Pheu Thai	
Udon Thani 6	Adisak Kaewmungkunsub	Thai Sang Thai	
Udon Thani 7	Thirachai Saenkaew	Pheu Thai	
Udon Thani 8	Graingsak Fhayseengam	Pheu Thai	
Udon Thani 9	Watcharaphon Khaokham	Pheu Thai	
Udon Thani 10	Thiapjutha Khaokham	Pheu Thai	
Yasothon 1	Supaporn Slabsri	Thai Sang Thai	
Yasothon 2	Boonkaeo Somwong	Pheu Thai	
Yasothon 3	Thanaphat Srichana	Bhumjaithai	

==== Northern ====
Pheu Thai (17) People's (14) Kla Tham (5) Democrat (1)

District	Elected MP	Party	Notes
Chiang Mai 1	Phetcharat Maichompoo	People's	
Chiang Mai 2	Karnik Chantada	People's	
Chiang Mai 3	Nattapon Towichakchaikul	People's	
Chiang Mai 4	Putita Chaianan	People's	
Chiang Mai 5	Julapun Amornvivat	Pheu Thai	
Chiang Mai 6	Oraphan Chantaruang	People's	
Chiang Mai 7	Balance Utcharoen	People's	
Chiang Mai 8	Pattarapong Leelaphat	People's	
Chiang Mai 9	Nares Thamrongthiphayakhun	Kla Tham	
Chiang Mai 10	Srisopha Kotkhamlue	Pheu Thai	
Chiang Rai 1	Chitwan Chinanuwat	People's	
Chiang Rai 2	Piyarat Tiyapairat	Pheu Thai	
Chiang Rai 3	Thakoon Yasaeng	People's	
Chiang Rai 4	Wisaradee Techateerawat	Pheu Thai	
Chiang Rai 5	Thedchart Chaiphong	Pheu Thai	
Chiang Rai 6	Chulalak Khansutam	People's	
Chiang Rai 7	Pichet Chuamuangphan	Pheu Thai	Second Deputy Speaker
Lampang 1	Tipa Paweenasathien	People's	
Lampang 2	Pairoat Lohsoonthorn	Pheu Thai	
Lampang 3	Chonthanee Chueanoi	People's	
Lampang 4	Raphatsorn Niyamosoth	People's	
Lamphun 1	Wittawisit Punsuanpluk	People's	
Lamphun 2	Rangsan Maneerat	Pheu Thai	
Mae Hong Son 1	Pakorn Chinakham	Kla Tham	
Mae Hong Son 2	Sombat Yasin	Democrat	
Nan 1	Songyos Ramsut	Pheu Thai	
Nan 2	Chonlanan Srikaew	Pheu Thai	
Nan 3	Nattapong Supriyasilp	Pheu Thai	
Phayao 1	Thamanat Prompow	Kla Tham	
Phayao 2	Anurat Tanbanjong	Kla Tham	
Phayao 3	Jeeradech Srivirach	Kla Tham	
Phare 1	Thosaporn Sereerak	Pheu Thai	
Phrae 2	Niyom Wiwattanaditkul	Pheu Thai	
Phrae 3	Worawat Auapinyakul	Pheu Thai	
Uttaradit 1	Krisana Seehalak	Pheu Thai	
Uttaradit 2	Warut Siriwat	Pheu Thai	
Uttaradit 3	Rawee Lek-uthai	Pheu Thai	

==== Southern ====
Democrat (17) United Thai Nation (14) Bhumjaithai (11) Prachachat (7) Palang Pracharath (4) Kla Tham (4) People's (3)

District	Elected MP	Party	Notes
Chumphon 1	Wichai Sudsawat	United Thai Nation	
Chumphon 2	Sant Saetang	United Thai Nation	
Chumphon 3	Supol Jullasai	United Thai Nation	
Krabi 1	Kitti Kittithornkul	Bhumjaithai	
Krabi 2	Thiradet Tangmankorkit	Bhumjaithai	
Krabi 3	Saritpong Kiewkong	Bhumjaithai	
Nakhon Si Thammarat 1	Rachit Sudpoom	Democrat	
Nakhon Si Thammarat 2	Songsak Musikong	Democrat	
Nakhon Si Thammarat 3	Pitakdej Dejdecho	Democrat	
Nakhon Si Thammarat 4	Yuttakarn Rattanamas	Democrat	
Nakhon Si Thammarat 5	Chaichana Detdacho	Democrat	
Nakhon Si Thammarat 6	Sutham Jaritngam	Palang Pracharath	
Nakhon Si Thammarat 7	Thatha Khaokham	Bhumjaithai	
Nakhon Si Thammarat 8	Kongkiat Kiatsombat	Kla Tham	Won By-election in 27 April 2025
Nakhon Si Thammarat 9	Auaypornsri Chaowalit	Democrat	
Nakhon Si Thammarat 10	Pimphattra Wichaikul	United Thai Nation	
Narathiwat 1	Watchara Yaworhasan	United Thai Nation	
Narathiwat 2	Amin Mayuso	Kla Tham	
Narathiwat 3	Samphan Mayusoh	Kla Tham	
Narathiwat 4	Zakariya Sai	Bhumjaithai	
Narathiwat 5	Kamonsak Leewamoh	Prachachat	
Pattani 1	Woravit Baru	Prachachat	
Pattani 2	Casey Mamu	Palang Pracharath	
Pattani 3	Sommut Benjalak	Prachachat	
Pattani 4	Yunaidee Waba	Democrat	
Pattani 5	Sahe Muhammad Al-Idrus	Prachachat	
Phang Nga 1	Atthaphon Trisri	Bhumjaithai	
Phang Nga 2	Chakat Pattanakitwibul	Palang Pracharath	
Phatthalung 1	Supatchee Thammaphet	Democrat	
Phatthalung 2	Nitisak Thammaphet	United Thai Nation	
Phatthalung 3	Romtham Khamnurak	Democrat	
Phuket 1	Somchat Techathavorncharoen	People's	
Phuket 2	Chalermpong Saengdee	People's	
Phuket 3	Thitikan Thitipruekthikul	People's	
Ranong 1	Kongkrit Chatmaleerat	Bhumjaithai	
Satun 1	Phiboon Ratchakitpakarn	Bhumjaithai	
Satun 2	Worasit Liangprasit	Bhumjaithai	
Songkhla 1	Sanphet Bunyamanee	Democrat	
Songkhla 2	Sarttra Sripan	United Thai Nation	
Songkhla 3	Somyot Plaidung	Democrat	
Songkhla 4	Chanonphat Naksua	Kla Tham	
Songkhla 5	Dej-is Khaothong	Democrat	
Songkhla 6	Suphaporn Kamnerdphol	Democrat	
Songkhla 7	Natchanon Srikokuea	Bhumjaithai	
Songkhla 8	Surin Palarae	Democrat	
Songkhla 9	Saksit Khaothong	Democrat	
Surat Thani 1	Kansinee Opas Rangsan	United Thai Nation	
Surat Thani 2	Pipit Rattanarak	United Thai Nation	
Surat Thani 3	Wachiraporn Kanjana	United Thai Nation	
Surat Thani 4	Pansak Boontan	United Thai Nation	
Surat Thani 5	Paramet Jina	United Thai Nation	
Surat Thani 6	Pichai Chompupon	Bhumjaithai	
Surat Thani 7	Thanin Nuanwat	United Thai Nation	
Trang 1	Thanompong Leekpai	United Thai Nation	
Trang 2	Satit Wongnongtoey	Palang Pracharath	
Trang 3	Sunutcha Losathapornpipit	Democrat	
Trang 4	Karn Tangpong	Democrat	
Yala 1	Sulaiman Buenapenae	Prachachat	
Yala 2	Sugarno Matha	Prachachat	
Yala 3	Abdul-ayee Samang	Prachachat	

==== Western ====
Bhumjaithai (4) United Thai Nation (4) Pheu Thai (3) Kla Tham (3) Move Forward (3) Democrat (2) Palang Pracharath (1)

District	Elected MP	Party	Notes
Kanchanaburi 1	Akaranan Kankittinan	Pheu Thai	
Kanchanaburi 2	Chusak Mantim	Pheu Thai	
Kanchanaburi 3	Yossawat Mapaisansin	Bhumjaithai	
Kanchanaburi 4	Wisuda Wichiansilp	Bhumjaithai	By-election held on 19 October 2025
Kanchanaburi 5	Phanom Phokaew	Pheu Thai	
Phetchaburi 1	Thiwanrat Angkinan	United Thai Nation	
Phetchaburi 2	Rerk Udee	Bhumjaithai	
Phetchaburi 3	Apichat Kaewkosol	United Thai Nation	
Prachuap Khiri Khan 1	Sangkhom Daengchot	Bhumjaithai	
Prachuap Khiri Khan 2	Chakkapan Piyapornpaiboon	Democrat	
Prachuap Khiri Khan 3	Pramual Pongthavaradet	Democrat	
Ratchaburi 1	Kulvaree Nopamornbodee	United Thai Nation	
Ratchaburi 2	Boonying Nitikanchana	Kla Tham	
Ratchaburi 3	Jatuporn Kamonphanthip	Kla Tham	
Ratchaburi 4	Akradech Wongpituchroj	United Thai Nation	
Ratchaburi 5	Chaithip Kamolpanthip	Kla Tham	
Samut Songkhram 1	Arnupap Likitamnuaychai	People's	
Tak 1	Krit Paniam	People's	
Tak 2	Ratchaphong Soisuwan	People's	
Tak 3	Pakpoom Boonpramuk	Palang Pracharath	

=== Party-list proportional representation ===
Rank	Elected MP	Party	Notes
1	Pita Limjaroenrat	Move Forward	Leader of Move Forward; Candidate for Prime Minister; Banned from political rights for 10 years
2	Chaithawat Tulathon	Move Forward	Banned from political rights for 10 years
3	Sirikanya Tansakun	People's	
4	Sia Champatong	People's	
5	Apisit Laisuttuklai	People's	
6	Apichat Sirisoontorn	Move Forward	Banned from political rights for 10 years
7	Wirot Lakkanaadisorn	People's	
8	Rangsiman Rome	People's	
9	Sittipon Wibultanakun	People's	
10	Surachet Pravinvongvuth	People's	
11	Parit Watcharasin	People's	
12	Nutthawut Buaprathum	People's	
13	Natthaphong Ruengpanyawut	People's	
14	Bencha Saengchan	Move Forward	Banned from political rights for 10 years
15	Chaiwat Satawornwijit	People's	
16	Tunyawat Kamolwongwat	People's	
17	Wayo Assawarungruang	People's	
18	Prasertpong Soornnuvatara	People's	
19	Manop Keereepuwadol	People's	
20	Romadon Panjor	People's	
21	Karunpon Thiensuwan	People's	
22	Pakornwut Udompipatskul	People's	
23	Poonsak Chanchampa	People's	
24	Supachot Chaiyasat	People's	
25	Saniwan Buaban	People's	
26	Nitipon Piwmow	People's	
27	Nateepat Kulsetthasith	Move Forward	Resigned 27 June 2023 after being convicted in a drunk driving case
28	Paramee Waijongcharoen	People's	
29	Woraporn Wiriyaroj	People's	
30	Surawat Thongbu	People's	
31	Khamphong Thephakham	People's	
32	Wanvipa Maison	People's	
33	Laofang Banthitterdsakun	People's	
34	Ongkan Chaiyabut	People's	
35	Chutima Kotchapan	People's	
36	Chunlapong Yuket	People's	
37	Kanlayapat Rajitroj	People's	
38	Narongdej Ularakun	People's	
39	Pakamon Noonanan	People's	
40	Suthep U-on	Move Forward	Assumed office on 7 July 2023, after the resignation of Nateepat Kulsetthasith. Banned from political rights for 10 years
1	Wiroj Pao-in	Pheu Thai	Died on 29 October 2025
2	Sompong Amornvivat	Pheu Thai	Resigned from the party on 17 October 2025
3	Prasert Jantararuangtong	Pheu Thai	Resigned 15 January 2024
4	Chusak Sirinin	Pheu Thai	
5	Chalerm Yubamrung	Pheu Thai	Resigned from the party 3 December 2025.
6	Krieng Kalptinan	Pheu Thai	
7	Suriya Juangroongruangkit	Pheu Thai	Resigned 19 January 2024
8	Suchart Tonjaroen	Pheu Thai	Resigned 9 July 2025
9	Sutin Khungsang	Pheu Thai	
10	Chaikasem Nitisiri	Pheu Thai	Resigned 5 October 2023
11	Somsak Thepsuthin	Pheu Thai	Resigned 15 January 2024
12	Visuth Chainaroon	Pheu Thai	
13	Chaturon Chaisang	Pheu Thai	
14	Pairoj Lohsoontorn	Pheu Thai	
15	Noppadon Pattama	Pheu Thai	Resigned 6 September 2025
16	Songklam Kitlerdpairoj	Pheu Thai	Resigned 2 October 2023
17	Prayut Siripanich	Pheu Thai	
18	Adisorn Piangket	Pheu Thai	
19	Nikom Boonwiset	Pheu Thai	
20	Khattiya Sawadipon	Pheu Thai	
21	Sudawan Wangsupakitkoson	Pheu Thai	Resigned 1 August 2024
22	Praweenut Intapanya	Pheu Thai	
23	Surakiat Thientong	Pheu Thai	
24	Jittipoj Wiriyaroj	Pheu Thai	
25	Danuporn Poonnakan	Pheu Thai	
26	Anusorn Eiamsa-ard	Pheu Thai	
27	Pisarn Wattanawongkiri	Pheu Thai	Resigned 15 October 2024
28	Sutham Sangprathum	Pheu Thai	
29	Lintiporn Warinwatchararoj	Pheu Thai	Resigned 18 July 2024
30	Srinyada Palimaphan	Pheu Thai	Assumed office on 9 October 2023, after the resignation of Songklam Kitlerdpairoj.
31	Penchisa Hongupathamchai	Pheu Thai	Assumed office on 9 October 2023, after the resignation of Chaikasem Nitisiri.
32	La-ong Tiyapairat	Pheu Thai	Assumed office on 15 January 2024, after the resignation of Prasert Jantararuangtong.
33	Nanat Hongchuwet	Pheu Thai	Assumed office on 15 January 2024, after the resignation of Prasert Somsak Thepsuthin. Resigned on 23 May 2024
34	Chanin Rungthanakiat	Pheu Thai	Assumed office on 22 January 2024, after the resignation of Suriya Juangroongruangkit. Resigned on 18 July 2025
35	Cherdchai Tantisirin	Pheu Thai	Assumed office on 24 May 2024, after the resignation of Nanat Hongchuwet.
36	Kokaew Pikunthong	Pheu Thai	Assumed office on 1 August 2024, after the resignation of Sudawan Wangsupakitkoson.
37	Khachit Chainikhom	Pheu Thai	Assumed office on 16 October 2024, after the resignation of Pisarn Wattanawongkiri.
38	Ekphon Raksuksuk	Pheu Thai	Assumed office on 9 July 2025, after the resignation of Suchart Tonjaroen.
39	Thanusak Lekuthai	Pheu Thai	Assumed office on 18 July 2025, after the resignation of Lintiporn Warinwatchararoj.
40	Thanapong Thanadechakul	Pheu Thai	Assumed office on 18 July 2025, after the resignation of Chanin Rungthanakiat.
41	Rungruang Pittayasiri	Pheu Thai	Assumed office on 9 September 2025, after the resignation of Noppadon Pattama.
42	Waraporn Tangpakorn	Pheu Thai	Assumed office on 20 October 2025, after the resignation of Sompong Amornvivat.
43	Surasit Nithiwutthiwarak	Pheu Thai	Assumed office on 31 October 2025, after the death of Wiroj Pao-in.
44	Somchai Asawachaisophon	Pheu Thai	Assumed office on 4 December 2025, after the resignation of Chalerm Yubamrung.
1	Peeraphan Salirathaviphak	United Thai Nation	Resigned on 30 June 2023
2	Supattanapong Punmeechaow	United Thai Nation	Resigned on 24 October 2023
3	Ekanat Promphan	United Thai Nation	
4	Chayothit Kridakorn	United Thai Nation	Resigned on 1 December 2023
5	Suchart Chomklin	United Thai Nation	Resigned on 8 September 2025
6	Pitcharat Laohaphongchana	United Thai Nation	
7	Wittaya Kaewparadai	United Thai Nation	
8	Chatchawan Kongudom	United Thai Nation	
9	Juti Krairiksh	United Thai Nation	
10	Thanakorn Wangboonkongchana	United Thai Nation	Resigned on 8 September 2025
11	Kriengyot Sudlapa	United Thai Nation	
12	Duangrit Benjathikun Chairungruang	United Thai Nation	
13	Chaiwat Paopiumsub	United Thai Nation	
14	Anucha Burapachaisri	United Thai Nation	Assumed office on 7 July 2023, after the resignation of Peeraphan Salirathaviphak.
16	Siriwan Prasatthasut	United Thai Nation	Assumed office on 24 October 2023, after the resignation of Peeraphan Salirathaviphak. (Skipped number 15)
17	Kecha Saksomboon	United Thai Nation	Assumed office on 4 December 2023, after the resignation of Chayothit Kridakorn.
18	Thipanan Sirichana	United Thai Nation	Assumed office on 9 September 2025, after the resignation of Suchart Chomklin.
20	Aswin Kwanmuang	United Thai Nation	Assumed office on 9 September 2025, after the resignation of Thanakorn Wangboonkongchana. (Skipped number 19)
1	Anutin Charnvirakul	Bhumjaithai	Leader of the Bhumjaithai Party
2	Saksayam Chidchob	Bhumjaithai	Resigned on 17 January 2024
3	Songsak Tongsri	Bhumjaithai	Resigned on 11 September 2023
4	Chalat Ratchakitprakarn	Bhumjaithai	Assumed office on 11 September 2023, after the resignation of Songsak Tongsri.
6	Nandana Songpracha	Bhumjaithai	Assumed office on 19 January 2024, after the resignation of Saksayam Chidchob. (Skip number 5)
1	Jurin Laksanawisit	Democrat	Leader of the Democrat Party
2	Chuan Leekpai	Democrat	
3	Banyat Bantadtan	Democrat	
1	Wan Muhamad Noor Matha	Prachachat	Speaker of the House
2	Tawee Sodsong	Prachachat	
1	Prawit Wongsuwan	Palang Pracharath	Leader of the Palang Pracharath Party
1	Sereepisuth Temeeyaves	Thai Liberal	Resigned on 1 September 2023
2	Mangkorn Yontrakul	Thai Liberal	Assumed office on 2 September 2024, after the resignation of Sereepisuth Temeeyaves.
1	Sudarat Keyuraphan	Thai Sang Thai	Resigned on 10 July 2023
2	Takorn Tantasith	Thai Sang Thai	Assumed office on 11 July 2023, after the resignation of Sudarat Keyuraphan.
1	Surathin Phichan	New Democracy	
1	Kriditaj Sangthanyothin	Kla Tham	Expelled from the New Party (Thailand), Joined the Kla Tham Party
1	Wannarat Channukul	Chart Pattana	Resigned on 19 March 2025
3	Aran Panthumchinda	Chart Pattana	Assumed office on 19 March 2025, after the resignation of Wannarat Channukul. (Skipped number 2)
1	Bancha Dechchareonsirikul	Kla Tham	Expelled from the Party of Thai Counties, Joined the Kla Tham Party
1	Varawut Silpa-archa	Chart Thai Pattana	
1	Kanvee Suebsaeng	Fair Party	
1	Chaowarit Khajohnpongkirati	Kla Tham	Expelled from the New Social Power Party, Joined the Kla Tham Party
1	Preeda Boonplerng	Kla Tham	Expelled from the Thai Teachers for People Party, Joined the Kla Tham Party

== Speaker election ==
The election for Speaker of the House of Representatives will take place on 4 July 2023, at 9.30am local time.

The speaker and two deputy speakers will be elected by a vote within the House, and appointed by the King. The Speaker is also the ex officio President of the National Assembly of Thailand. Although the Speaker is usually a member of the largest party, this is not a requirement. In fact, the previous speaker, Chuan Leekpai, was a member of the Democrat Party, despite that party not being the largest in the House at the time.

Both the Move Forward Party and the Pheu Thai Party announced that they wanted the House speakership. They were scheduled to meet on 28 June to resolve the disagreement, but this meeting was canceled. Move Forward has nominated Padipat Suntiphada, an MP from Phitsanulok's 1st district to be the speaker. On 3 July, the day of the opening of the new parliament, the Pheu Thai Party announced that their MPs had resolved to nominate Prachachat Party leader and former speaker Wan Muhamad Noor Matha as an alternative speaker candidate. In response, Wan Muhamad said that he did not want the position, but that "If Pheu Thai really resolves to nominate me, I am willing to accept the nomination, but we have to listen to the opinions of Move Forward and the people. If the people agree, I am happy to work for them, although it will be the last time in my political life." The decision by Pheu Thai MPs still needed to be ratified by the party's executive committee. Move Forward later agreed to support Wan Muhamad, ending the crisis.

Move Forward then nominated Padipat Suntiphada for first deputy speaker instead, and the United Thai Nation Party nominated veteran politician Witthaya Kaewparadai, a party list MP.

Candidate	Votes	%
√ Padipat Suntiphada (MFP)	312	62.9%
Witthaya Kaewparadi (UTN)	105	21.2%
Not voting	2	0.4%

The post of second deputy speaker went to Pheu Thai's Pichet Chuamuangphan, a constituency MP from Chiang Rai province.

== Major legislation ==
=== Enacted ===
- 27 March 2024: Marriage Equality Act
- 15 January 2025: Community Liquor Act

=== Proposed (but not enacted) ===
- Anti-Discrimination Bill
- Entertainment Complex Bill
- Joint Ticket Management Bill
- Gender Recognition Bill
- Clean Air Bill
- Climate Change Bill
- Ethnic Protection Bill
