= Alcohol in Thailand =

Two herbal liqueurs in a shop in Prachuap Khiri Khan

Alcohol in Thailand refers to the alcohol industry, alcohol consumption and laws related to alcohol in Thailand. In 2023, 5.73 million people (10.05% of the population) demonstrated signs of alcoholism.

== Domestic market ==
Thailand's alcoholic drinks market was valued at approximately 473 billion baht ($13.97 billion) in 2020. The market has been characterized as a monopoly.

=== Beer ===
Over half of the alcoholic drinks market consists of beer, and is effectively a duopoly, with Boon Rawd Brewery (which produces Singha and Leo beers) comprising a 58% share and ThaiBev (which produces Chang beer) at 34.3%.

Under the 1950 Liquor Act, individuals are prohibited from brewing and distributing their own beer. Despite this, a large craft beer market exists in Thailand, with microbreweries established across the country.

=== Liquor ===
The liquor market is predominately controlled by ThaiBev (which produces SangSom, Mekhong and Hong Thong) and controls over a 90% share. The Thai government issues two forms of distilling licenses, "community" and "special".

==== Special licenses ====
Special licenses give companies the right to export their products and have less restrictions, but require a minimum daily production capacity of 30,000 liters and for distillers to receive an environmental certificate.

==== Community licenses ====
Community licenses are more easily obtained, but limit distillers to 6 employees. Distillers are limited to 5 horsepower of electricity usage. Community licenses restrict distillers to labelling their products as white spirits (Thai: เหล้าขาว) and dark, or colored spirits (Thai: เหล้าสี).

== Legislation and guidelines ==
=== Legal drinking age ===
In Thailand, the legal drinking age is 20. The Alcoholic Beverage Control Act of 2008 increased the drinking age in Thailand from 18 to 20, private drinking is not regulated in private locations.

=== Alcohol advertising ===
Thailand has strict laws controlling the advertising of alcohol and alcoholic products, under the Alcoholic Beverage Control Act, BE 2551 (2008). In 2024, the Public Health Ministry proposed a new bill to further restrict alcohol-related advertisements.

=== Community Liquor Bill ===
In 2025, the House of Representatives unanimously passed the Community Liquor Bill, which would liberalize alcohol manufacturing.
