= Padipat Suntiphada =

Thai politician (born 1981)

Padipat Suntiphada DM
- ปดิพัทธ์ สันติภาดา
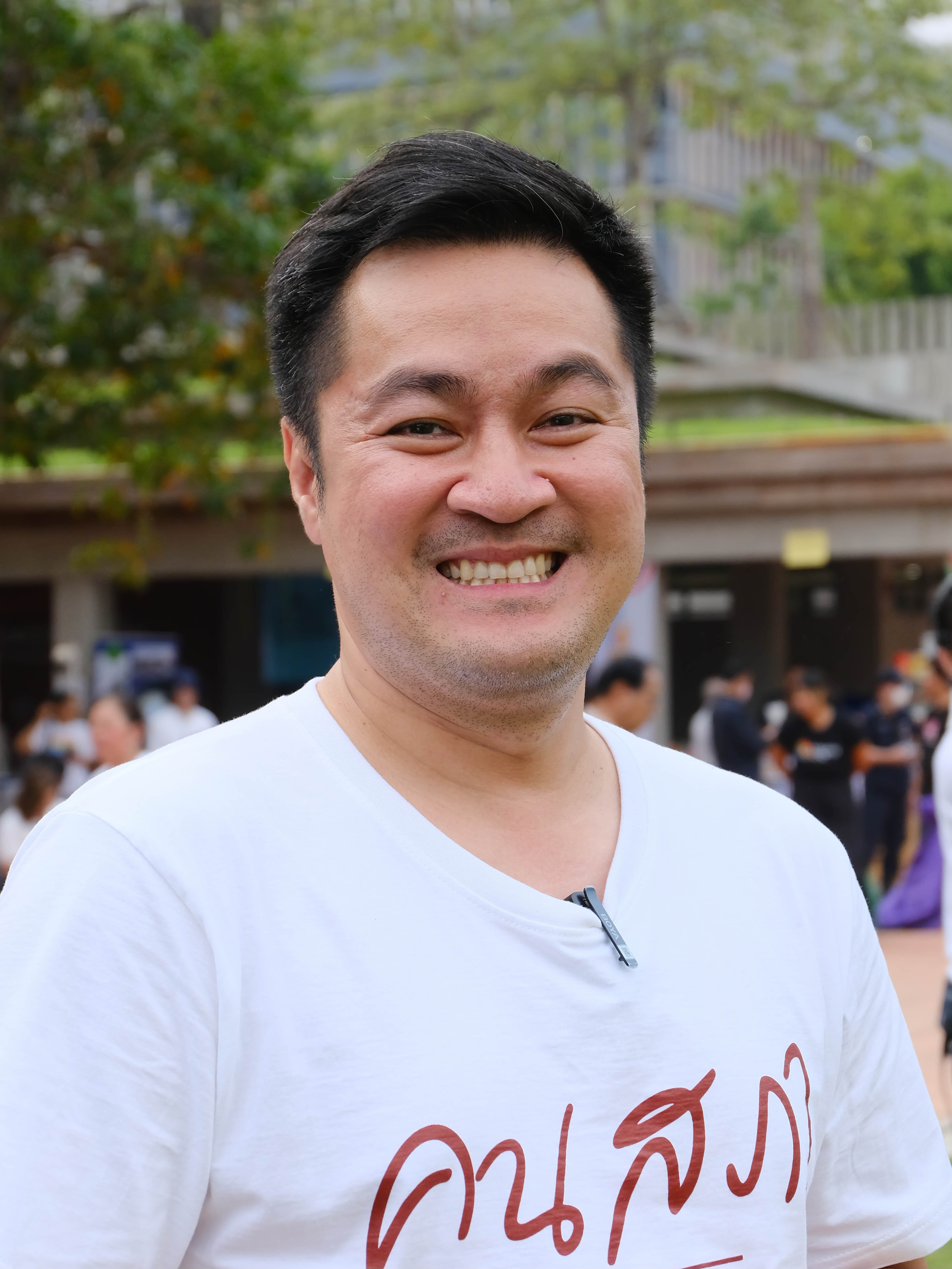
- Padipat in 2023

First Deputy Speaker of the House of Representatives of Thailand
- In office 5 July 2023 – 7 August 2024 Serving with Pichet Chuamuangphan
- Prime Minister: Prayut Chan-o-cha; Srettha Thavisin
- Speaker: Wan Muhamad Noor Matha
- Preceded by: Suchart Tancharoen
- Succeeded by: Pichet Chuamuangphan

Member of the House of Representatives for Phitsanulok 1st
- In office 24 March 2019 – 7 August 2024
- Preceded by: Warong Detkitvikrom
- Succeeded by: TBD
- Majority: 21,746 (22.02%)

Personal details
- Born: 15 October 1981 (age 44) Phitsanulok, Thailand
- Party: Progressive Movement (2024–present)
- Other political affiliations: Future Forward (2018–2020); Move Forward (2020–2023); Fair Party (2023–2024)
- Spouse: Piyanuch Suntiphada
- Children: 2
- Education: Chulalongkorn University; Trinity Theological College
- Occupation: Politician
- Religion: Christianity
- Nickname: Ong
- Padipat Suntiphada's voice Padipat reading Ecclesiastes 3:4-6 in Thai; Recorded 2 August 2023

Padipat Suntiphada (Thai: ปดิพัทธ์ สันติภาดา, pronounced [pà.dì.pʰát̚ sǎn.tì.pʰāː.dāː]; born 15 October 1981) is a Thai veterinarian and politician who served as the First Deputy Speaker of the House of Representatives of Thailand and Member of Parliament for Phitsanulok's 1st district from 2023 to 2024.

On the 7 August 2024 Padipat was banned from politics along with other politicians after a ruling from the Constitutional Court of Thailand

== Education ==
Padipat received a Bachelor of Veterinary Medicine from Chulalongkorn University and a Master of Theological Studies from Trinity Theological College, Singapore. He did not want to be a veterinarian or open a clinic after graduation. As a result, he did not register with the Veterinary Council per the requirement for being a veterinarian in Thailand. He worked as a technical sales representative of a veterinarian product group instead.

== Political career ==
Padipat was first elected to the House of Representatives in 2019 under the Future Forward Party. He moved to the Move Forward Party after Future Forward was disbanded and was elected as a member of its executive board. He was the second deputy chairman of the Parliamentary Committee on Political Development, Mass Communications, and Public Participation.

He kept his seat in the 2023 election and was later elected First Deputy Speaker at the beginning of the first House session. He resigned from his party executive position to comply with the requirements that Speaker and Deputies must be impartial.

Padipat worked at the Thai Christian Students Association from 2005 to 2018. His belief as a devout Christian made him abstain from voting on a Marriage Equality Bill that was proposed by his party in 2022. After being elected Deputy Speaker, he said that he will vote for the bill and will not impede its parliamentary process.

=== Revocation of Move Forward Party membership ===
On 28 September 2023, during a meeting between a Padipat and the party executive committee, Padipat expressed his intention to continue in his role as the deputy speaker. This conflicted with the party's intention to serve as leader of the opposition. Therefore, the Move Forward party's executive committee took the decision to revoke Padipat's membership.

Under Section 106 of the Thai constitution, the opposition leader is appointed from the largest opposition party where its party leader is a serving MP. The constitution defines an opposition party as a party that does not sit in cabinet. However, the 2019 Thai constitution is the first one to add the speakership and deputy speakership as disqualifying conditions for a party to be able to hold the opposition leadership separate from the nominal definition of an opposition party. Padipat will have thirty days to join a new party lest he forfeits his position as deputy speaker and MP. The Thai Sang Thai Party and the Fair Party have expressed interests in welcoming Padipat.

After the decision to revoke Padipat's membership was announced through Move Forward's official channels, various government MPs came out to criticise the decision as being political theatre and an attempt to cling on to power. The government chief whip, Adisorn Piangkes, posted a poem critical of Padipat on his personal Twitter account. He also announced that Pheu Thai will file a complaint to the election commission on the question of whether Move Forward's party executive committee violated the party regulation on the conditions in which membership can be rescinded.

On 10 October Padipat announced his intention to join the Fair Party, accompanied by the party's leader and secretary-general. He said that he will have to wait for official confirmation of the nullification of his Move Forward party membership from the Election Commission before he can formally begin the process of joining the Fair Party.

=== 2024 politics ban ===
In 2024, the Constitutional Court of Thailand ordered the dissolution of the Move Forward Party on the grounds that its advocacy for reforms of Thailand's lèse-majesté laws constituted an attempt to overthrow the constitutional monarchy. Part of the dissolution ruling included a 10-year ban of party executives from politics. While no longer a part of the party, this included Padipat as he had been a party executive during the period covered by the ruling.

== Honours ==
Padipat has received the following royal decorations in the Honours System of Thailand:

- 2020 - Knight Commander (2nd Class) of the Most Noble Order of the Crown of Thailand
