= Tak Bai incident =

Riots during the unrest on South Thailand

Tak Bai Incident
- Part of the South Thailand insurgency
- Protesters rounded up by Thai security personnel.

- Tak Bai district within Narathiwat province
- Native name: กรณีตากใบ
- Date: 25 October 2004
- Location: Tak Bai police station, Tak Bai, Thailand; 6°15′33.5982″N 102°3′16.6782″E
- Type: purge, riots
- Cause: Arrest of 6 village defence volunteers
- Perpetrators: Thai military and police
- Deaths: 85

The Tak Bai incident (Thai: กรณีตากใบ), also known as the Tak Bai massacre, was the mass death of 85 Malay Muslims in Thailand's Narathiwat province on 25 October 2004. The incident occurred as part of the South Thailand insurgency between the Thai government and Malay Muslim separatists.

After the arrest of six individuals, around 2,000 protestors assembled in front of the Tak Bai police station in Narathiwat province to demand their release. Attempts to negotiate a peaceful solution failed, and Thai police and military then began to violently disperse the protestors from the area. Over 1,000 people were subsequently detained and transported to an army camp in neighbouring Pattani province in cramped conditions, resulting in the death of 78 people.

The Bangkok Post called the incident a "tragedy" and "one of the worst blunders ever committed by the military in the restive deep South". Amnesty International protested what it called the "virtual impunity" for human rights violations in southern Thailand, calling for members of the security forces involved to be "brought to justice". Despite attempts to prosecute Thai officials involved, the statute of limitations on the case expired in 2024 and no individuals have been prosecuted. The incident is one of the deadliest to have occurred during the South Thailand insurgency.

== Background ==
Map of Thailand's Deep South and its ethnic composition.

Thailand's Deep South includes the Malay Muslim majority provinces of Narathiwat, Pattani and Yala, and four districts of Songkhla province: Chana, Na Thawi, Saba Yoi, and Thepha. Since January 2004, armed separatist resistance against the Thai government witnessed an upsurge. In response to the insurgency, Prime Minister Thaksin Shinawatra declared martial law in the three Deep South provinces on 5 January 2004. As a result, military officials were given the ability to detain anyone suspected of breaking the law and ban public gatherings under Article 11(1). Additionally, Article 16 provides legal immunity for state officials for any actions committed for national security.

== Incident ==
=== Protest ===
On 25 October 2004, from 6 a.m., hundreds of ethnic Malay Muslims gathered outside the Tak Bai police station in Tak Bai district, Narathiwat Province, to protest the detention of six individuals which they viewed as unjust. These six (Mahamakusohlee Jehwae, Yukimule Hakoming, Abduklramai Sakuling, Arun Binmah, Rongning Binmah, and Kama Ali) were village defence volunteers from village no. 5 in Phron sub-district in Tak Bai district. On 12 October, they reported to the Tak Bai police station that their government-issued shotguns had been stolen. After a closer examination, an inquiry had found they had allegedly provided their weapons to another group and the six were subsequently detained for embezzlement and a filing a false crime report. While detained, the six admitted to handing the weapons over to Nisen and Niramlee Nisulong, who had arrest warrants place for their arrest.

Besides those who had gathered at the police station to demand the release of the six men, others said they had gathered to perform hayat prayers, became stuck in the crowd or were just bystanders watching. By 8 a.m., the protestors had gathered in three main locations: 400 in front of the police station, 300 around Taba market, and 100 at Tak Bai intersection. Around 10 a.m., the number of protestors in front of the police station had grown to around 1,300. At around 9 a.m., acting-Superintendent of the Tak Bai police station Pakdee Preechachon ordered the establishment of blockades at Tha Phraek bridge, Sadet beach and the Tak Bai - Su-ngai Kolok intersection to prevent more people from joining the protest; they were ineffective and Pakdee radioed for reinforcements.

According to the fact-finding committee established by the government after the incident, the authorities viewed the protest with suspicion. Earlier, intelligence from the Southern Border Provinces Peace Building Command (SBPPBC) had warned the authorities that the insurgent group Barisan Revolusi Nasional (BRN) would be mobilising people in Narathiwat, Pattani, Songkhla and Yala provinces to create unrest by using the arrest of the six village defence volunteers as the trigger.

=== Negotiations between officials and protestors ===
The first attempt in negotiations between officials and protestors began around 9:10 a.m., and were spearheaded by Mustapa Tanyinayu, the sub-district chief of Chehe sub-district, and Roseng Vannaware, president of the Tak Bai District Iman Club. Negotiations failed as they received no representatives from the protestors. Around 10:30 a.m., Nipon Naraphitakkul, the Deputy Governor and the Permanent Secretary of the province, arrived at the station. Nipon addressed around 500 protestors, saying that the six detained individuals were actually being detained at Narathiwat Provincial Prison around 30 kilometres (19 mi) away. He also urged the protestors to appoint representatives for further discussions. Nipon, however, received further angers and call for the release of the six. Around 11 a.m., Siwa Saengmanee, the deputy director of the SBPPBC, had arrived at the police station from Sirindhorn Camp in Yala province. Siwa then addressed the crowd asking for them to appoint representatives, and explaining that the detained six cannot be released at the moment. Additionally, Nipon spoke that they can be released through bail, which he would support. The protestors still showed resistance, demanding the release of the six.

After these negotiations attempts failed, a meeting was summoned between government officials around 11:50 a.m. to discuss ways to end the protest. A few minutes prior, police had fired in the air as a warning after some protestors attempted to enter the station. Among the officials present were Wongkot Maneerin; Wichom Thongsong, Governor of Narathiwat province; Chalermchai Wirunpeth, commander of the Fifth Infantry Division; and Siwa. Another meeting was then convened at 1 p.m., where Chalermchai was tasked with the dispersal of protestors. Before the dispersal occurred, officials tried again to negotiate with the crowd by bringing in members of the Provincial Islamic Committee and the families of the six detained. As they did before, these sets of negotiations failed. However, many people among the crowd were either unable to leave the protest or unable to hear any explanations by officials.

=== Dispersal of the protest and transportation of detainees ===
Around 3 p.m., tensions between the protestors and police and military had risen as some began to throw objects at officials. Among the crowd, a few of the demonstrators were armed with fire arms. When police had dispersed the crowd, they discovered a cache of weapons including M16 and AK47 rifles, 16 different pistols, grenades and several machetes. However, interviews conducted by Amnesty International claimed that they were largely peaceful to the police and military. By 3:10 p.m., some protestors attempted to breach police barricades at the police station.

In response to this, various Thai military and police units began dispersing the protesters. The main methods used by military and police officers to disperse the protestors were the use of live ammunition, water cannons and tear gas. As a result, seven protestors were shot dead, numerous people were injured and around 1,370 male protestors were arrested. The male protestors had been separated from the women and children, and ordered to take off their shirts which were used to tie their hands behind their backs.

Of the 1,370 protestors detained, 1,292 of them were crammed into 26 military trucks in order to transport them to Ingkayut Borihan Army Camp in Pattani province around 150 kilometres (93 mi) away. In the trucks, they were forced to lie on top of each other in layers of three to five. Soldiers assigned to the trucks would beat any detainee that made too much noise. The trucks had left Tak Bai around 5 p.m., and arrived at Ingkayut Borihan seven hours later. As a result, 78 people were killed on the journey from either being crushed to death or asphyxia.

The remaining prisoners were held by the military for several days without appropriate medical attention, resulting in further injuries. They were later transported to army camps in Chumphon and Surat Thani provinces. On 24 January 2005, 59 detainees were indicted by the Narathiwat Provincial Public Prosecutor for restricting an officer's ability to perform their duty and gathering in an assembly of 10 or more with the intention to cause violence under Sections 139 and 215 of the Criminal Code of Thailand.

== Responses ==
=== From the government ===
Prime Minister Thaksin Shinawatra expressed regret for the deaths, but he insisted there had been no wrongdoing by military personnel. As a result of the incidents at Tak Bai and Krue Se Mosque, Thaksin enacted the Executive Decree on Public Administration in Emergency Situation, coming into effect in the three Deep South provinces on 19 July 2005. Section 17 of the decree gives law enforcement officer's immunity from prosecution for any actions committed while they were on duty.

Funeral prayers held for the dead victims, Tak Bai, Thailand

When Surayud Chulanont became Prime Minister after ousting Thaksin Shinawatra in the 2006 coup d'état, he publicly apologised on 2 November 2006 for the incident alongside the Krue Se incident, promising to hold the perpetrators to responsibility. Two days later, the charges against surviving protesters were dropped. The Asian Human Rights Commission called for prosecutions, stating, "After two years, the apology is welcome, but investigation and prosecution is imperative."

==== Compensation ====
Families of victims killed during the incident filed a civil lawsuit against the Ministry for Defence and Royal Thai Army with the goal of compensation. The matter later reached a settlement. On 20 March 2007, 79 plaintiffs received ฿42,000,000 (US$1.31 million) in total. However, a condition to this settlement was that the plaintiffs had to declare that they were satisfied and would not seek further civil or criminal lawsuits.

In 2012, the Yingluck Shinawatra government began compensating families affected by the Tak Bai and other tragedies in the Deep South. Families ended up receiving ฿7,500,000 (US$234,521.58) in compensation.

=== Retaliations ===
On 2 November 2004, Jaran Torae, a Buddhist deputy police chief, was found beheaded in Narathiwat Province. A handwritten note described the murder as retaliation for the deaths at Tak Bai. Several other killings of Buddhist village leaders and police officials were attributed to revenge for the incident.

At 9:50 p.m. on 29 September 2024, a car bomb exploded in Tak Bai district, injuring two soldiers. According to Deputy Prime Minister and Minister of Defence, Phumtham Wechayachai, the bombing may have been connected to the case, which expired less than a month later. According to Sunai Phasuk of Human Rights Watch, BRN was preparing to increase violent activities around the 20th anniversary.

== Investigation and prosecution ==
On 2 November 2004, Thaksin formed the Independent Fact-finding Committee on the Death in Tak Bai District Incident to independently investigate the incident. In December 2004, the committee found that the methods used to disperse the protestors were not appropriate and out-of-place with international guidelines and practices. Additionally, it found that commanding officers failed to supervise the transport of detainees by leaving to more inexperienced and low-ranking personnel.

On 29 May 2009, the Songkhla provincial court ruled in the post-mortem inquest of the 78 prisoners who died. The inquest found they had suffocated in military custody without specifically stating all the circumstances that caused their death, whilst also justifying that the actions were necessary. This ruling was criticised by the International Commission of Jurists. Additionally, the case was challenged by the victim's families. However, the Supreme Court upheld the Songkhla provincial court's ruling on 1 August 2013, concluding also that the military personnel were just performing their duties and thus did not bear any legal responsibility for the incident. The Songkhla court's ruling effectively absolved the officers who were involved from criminal responsibility.

On 12 December 2023, the Prachachat Party - a party popular among Malay Muslims - had pushed for a House committee to conduct an inquiry into why legal proceedings had taken so long. However, the Thai government led by the Pheu Thai-conservative coalition which Prachachat is part of, remained ambiguous on the case.

=== 2024 criminal suite ===
On 25 April 2024 - six months before the statute of limitations expired - 48 victims and their families directly filled criminal lawsuits with the Narathiwat provincial court against officials they believe to be responsible for human right violations. The court went on to indict nine former senior officials on 23 August. They are listed below with the position they held at the time of the incident:

- Gen. Pisarn Wattanawongkiri, the Fourth Army Region commander
- Gen. Chalermchai Wirunpeth, the Fifth Infantry Division commander
- Lt.-Gen. Sinchai Nutsathit
- Pol. Gen. Wongkot Maneerin, the Police Forward Command Centre
- Pol. Gen. Pakdee Preechachon
- Pol. Lt.-Gen. Manot Kraiwong, the Provincial Police Region 9 chief
- Pol. Maj.-Gen. Saksomchai Phutthakul, the Tak Bai district police station superintendent
- Siwa Saengmanee, the SBPPBC deputy director
- Wichom Thongsong, the governor of Narathiwat province

Separately on 18 September, the attorney general of Thailand brought forward another criminal case, where murder charges was filled against Chalermchai and seven people who were responsible for driving and guarding the trucks used to transport the prisoners. Under Thailand's Criminal Procedure Code, the case is an 'extrajudicial killing' and the accused were said to have committed 'intentional murder with foreseeable consequences'. Apart from Chalermchai, they are listed below:

- Wissanu Lertsonkhram
- Piti Yankaew
- Lt. Wissanukorn Chaisarn
- Lt. Rithirong Promrith
- Sub-Lt. Natthawuit Loemsai
- Lt.-Col. Prasert Mutmin
- Sgt. Maj. Rattanadet Srisuwan

However, for both cases to avoid the statute of limitations that expires on 25 October 2024, at least one defendant must show up for the courts to acknowledge that the case began. On 12 September, seven of nine indicted on 23 August were supposed to show up to the Narathiwat provincial court for witness questioning and evidence examining. They were all absent. As a consequence, the Narathiwat Criminal Court issued arrest warrants for six of them: Chalermchai, Wongkot, Manot, Saksomchai, Siwa and Wichom. An arrest warrant was not issued for Pisarn as he was protected under immunity as a Pheu Thai party-list MP. MPs are protected from arrest while performing legislative duties under Section 125 of the Constitution. The House of Representatives had debated whether to waive his immunity on 10 September, which was supported by the main opposition party, the People's Party. Taking advantage of his approved overseas leave between 26 August and 30 October to seek medical treatment, Pisarn fled Thailand and resigned as an MP on 14 October. Other indicted individuals were alleged to have also fled Thailand, allegedly to Japan and the United Kingdom. By the time the case was supposed to start on 12 October, they were all absent.

=== End of the statute of limitations ===
On 25 October 2024, the statute of limitations (the maximum time legal proceedings can began) for the case ended, preventing any new legal action to prosecute individuals for the massacre. Under Section 95 of Chapter 9 of the criminal code of Thailand, the maximum period before a case is precluded by prescription is 20 years, with this only applying to cases where the offence is punishable by death and imprisonment for 20 years to life. However, according to Thammasat University law lecturer Prinya Thaewanarumitkul, the government could extend the statute of limitations by issuing an executive decree under Section 29 of the Constitution. On 24 October, Paetongtarn apologised on behalf of the government for the incident, but said it was not possible to extend the statute of limitations. She argued that the 20-year statute of limitations could not be extended as the Council of State advised it would violate the constitution, and that the case should not be politicised.

By the expiration date, none of the defendants had shown up to court. On 28 October, the case against the seven indicted officials was dismissed by the Narathiwat court without any possibility of it being re-open.

On 23 February 2025, Thaksin Shinawatra issued a public apology over the incident.

== See also ==
- Dasht-i-Leili massacre
- Gaza war protests
