= Tawee Sodsong =

Thai politician

Tawee Sodsong MPCh MVM
- ทวี สอดส่อง
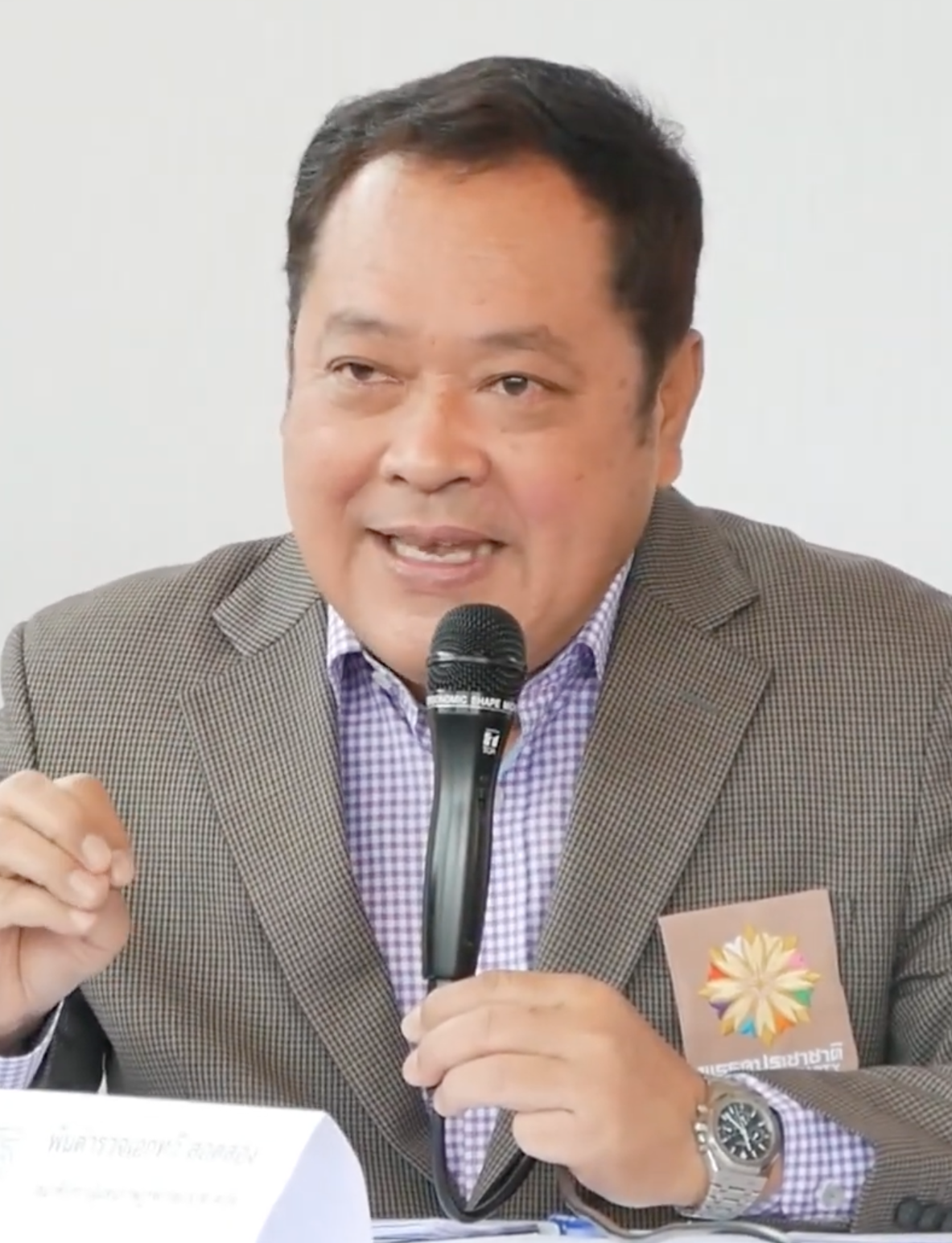
- Tawee in 2022

Minister of Justice
- In office 1 September 2023 – 19 September 2025
- Prime Minister: Srettha Thavisin; Phumtham Wechayachai (acting); Paetongtarn Shinawatra; Suriya Juangroongruangkit (acting)
- Preceded by: Somsak Thepsuthin
- Succeeded by: Rutthapon Naowarat

Leader of the Prachachat Party
- Incumbent
- Assumed office 26 August 2023
- Preceded by: Wan Muhamad Noor Matha

Personal details
- Born: 23 September 1959 (age 67) Sawaeng Ha, Ang Thong, Thailand
- Party: Prachachat
- Education: Police Cadet Academy (BS); Kasetsart University (MA)
- Occupation: Politician; police officer
- Police career
- Department: Royal Thai Police
- Branch: Metropolitan Police Bureau
- Service years: 1984–2004
- Rank: Police Colonel

Tawee Sodsong (Thai: ทวี สอดส่อง, RTGS: Thawi Sotsong) is a Thai politician, serving as Minister of Justice since 2023. He is also leader of the Prachachat Party. Tawee oversaw the parole and release of former prime minister of Thailand Thaksin Shinawatra following his return to Thailand in 2023.

== Royal decorations ==
Tawee has received the following royal decorations in the Honours System of Thailand:

- 2013 - Knight Grand Cordon of the Most Exalted Order of the White Elephant
- 2011 - Knight Grand Cordon of The Most Noble Order of the Crown of Thailand
- 2013 - Border Service Medal
- 2005 - Chakrabarti Mala Medal – Medal for Long Service and Good Conduct (Civil)
