= Chalermchai Wirunpeth =

Chalermchai Wirunpeth (Thai: เฉลิมชัย วิรุฬห์เพชร) is a Thai former military officer. Chalermchai served as the Fifth Infantry Division commander during the 25 October 2004 Tak Bai Massacre in Southern Thailand, which killed 85 people. He called in forces from various units and arranged 25 trucks in preparation for dispersing the protest. In 2005, he was removed from his post and moved to an advisory position, but faced no further disciplinary action.

== Tak Bai massacre trial ==
In 2024, Chalermchai was charged in two criminal cases related to the Tak Bai Massacre. He was among 9 former security officials named in an April 2024 suit filed in the Narathiwat Provincial Court. Those charges were accepted on 23 August 2024.

On 12 September 2024, Chalermchai was among six soldiers and two civilians charged in the Pattani Provincial Court.
