= Bhichai Rattakul =

Thai politician (1924–2022)

- พิชัย รัตตกุล
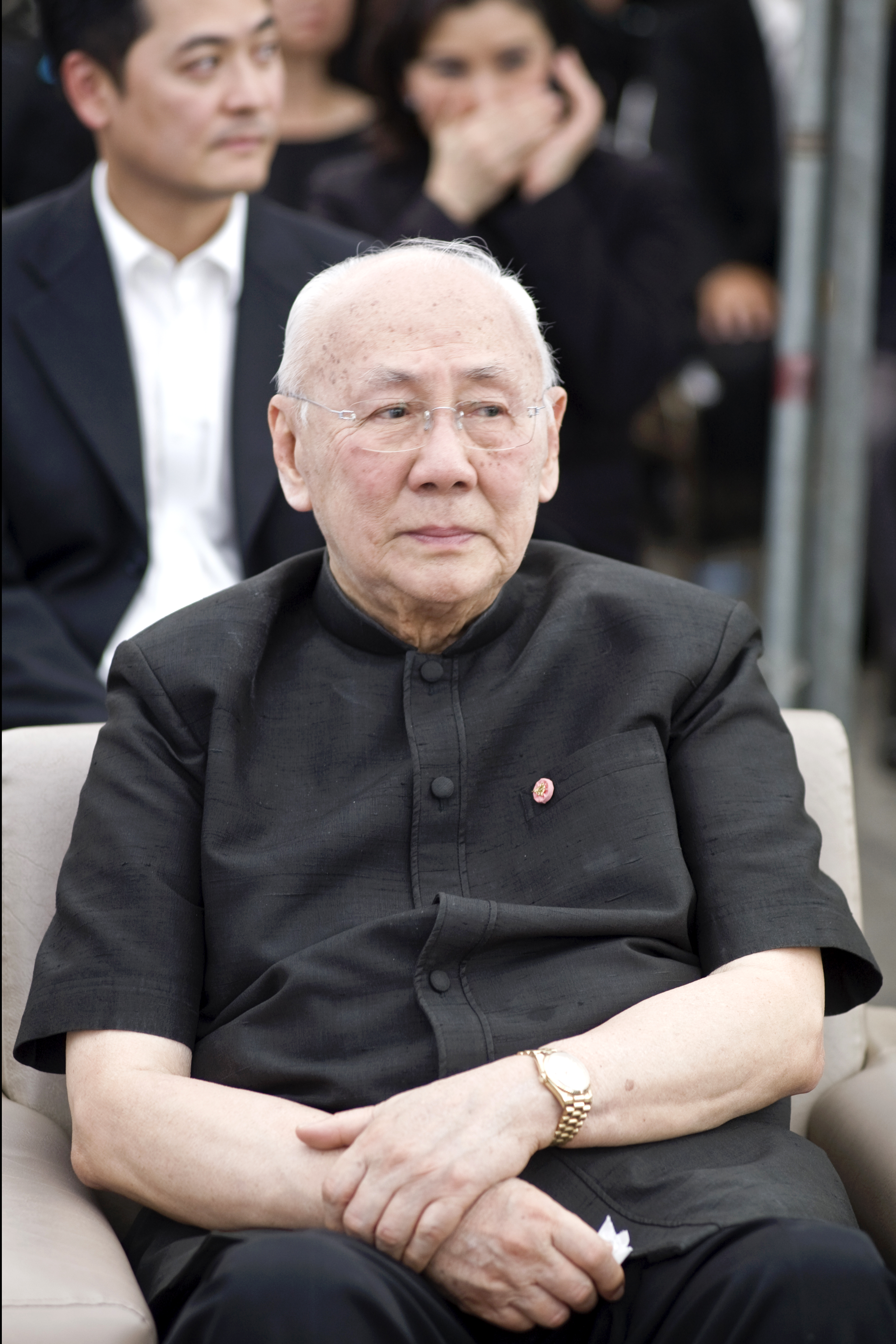
- Bhichai in 2010

Speaker of the House of Representatives and President of the National Assembly of Thailand
- In office 30 June 2000 – 9 November 2000
- Monarch: Bhumibol Adulyadej
- Prime Minister: Chuan Leekpai
- Preceded by: Wan Muhamad Noor Matha
- Succeeded by: Uthai Pimchaichon

Deputy Prime Minister of Thailand
- In office 14 November 1997 – 28 June 2000
- Prime Minister: Chuan Leekpai
- In office 30 April 1983 – 9 December 1990
- Prime Minister: Prem Tinsulanonda; Chatichai Choonhavan

Minister of Foreign Affairs
- In office 21 April 1976 – 6 October 1976
- Prime Minister: Seni Pramoj
- Preceded by: Chatichai Choonhavan
- Succeeded by: Upadit Pachariyangkun
- In office 21 February 1975 – 17 March 1975
- Prime Minister: Seni Pramoj
- Preceded by: Chatichai Choonhavan
- Succeeded by: Jaroonpan Isarangkul Na Ayuthaya

Leader of the Democrat Party
- In office 4 April 1982 – 20 January 1989
- Preceded by: Thanat Khoman
- Succeeded by: Chuan Leekpai

Personal details
- Born: 16 September 1924 Bangkok, Siam
- Died: 28 February 2022 (aged 97) Bangkok, Thailand
- Party: Democrat
- Spouse: Jaruay Rattakul
- Children: Bhichit Rattakul
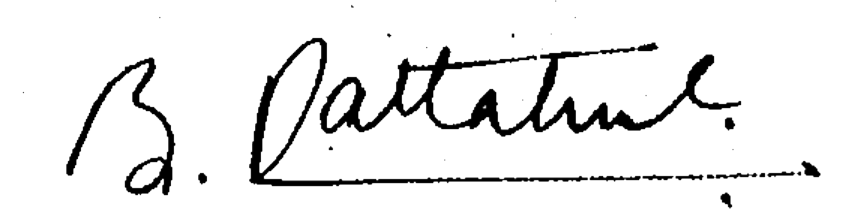
- Signature

Bhichai Rattakul (Thai: พิชัย รัตตกุล, RTGS: Phichai Rattakun, IPA: [pʰí.t͡ɕʰaj rát.tà.kun]; 16 September 1924 – 28 February 2022) was a Thai politician who served as the deputy prime minister from 1983 to 1990 and 1997 to 2000, speaker of the House of Representatives, and president of the National Assembly. He was also leader of the Democrat Party between 1982 and 1990, and the world president of Rotary International from 2002 to 2003.

== Early life and education ==
Bhichai Rattakul (陳裕財) was born on 16 September 1924 into a Thai Chinese family. He graduated from Bangkok Christian College and St Stephen's College in Hong Kong.

== Political career ==
He served as the deputy prime minister between 1983 and 1990 and between 1997 and 2000, the speaker of the House of Representatives and the president of the National Assembly, the leader of the Democrat Party between 1982 and 1990, and the world president of Rotary International between 2002 and 2003.

He was a past president of Rotary International, serving from 2002 to 2003, as well as an advisor and member of Rotary Club of Bangkok, the first Rotary Club in Thailand.

== Personal life ==
He was married to Khunying Jaruay Rattakul and had two sons and one daughter, whose names are Bhichit Rattakul, the former governor of Bangkok between 1996 and 2000, Anatchai Rattakul and Khunying Patchari Wongphaitoon.

== Death ==
Bhichai died of lung cancer at Siriraj Hospital, on 28 February 2022, at the age of 97.

== Honours ==
- Order of the White Elephant
- Order of the Crown of Thailand
