= Tanadej Pengsuk =

Thai politician (born 1993)

- ธนเดช เพ็งสุข

Member of the House of Representatives
- Incumbent
- Assumed office 14 May 2023
- Preceded by: Kasidet Chutimant

Personal details
- Born: 1993 (age 32–33) Bangkok, Thailand
- Party: People's (2024–present)
- Other political affiliations: Future Forward (2018–2020) Move Forward (2020–2024)

Tanadej Pengsuk (Thai: ธนเดช เพ็งสุข), nicknamed Phum (Thai: ภูมิ) is a Thai politician and represents as a member of the House of Representatives for the People's Party.

== Life and career ==
Tanadej Penguk was born in 1993, in Bangkok, and lived in Lat Phrao District. He studied highschool at P.P.R. Ratchawittayalai School in Class 41. He continuied his military education and then graduated from the Armed Forces Academies Preparatory School in Class 52. He then studied at the Royal Thai Air Force Academy in Class 59. After completing his military education, he entered active service as an officer in the Royal Thai Air Force, holding the rank of Flight Lieutenant before changing to political career.

Pengsuk started his political career when he ran as a candidate for the 2023 Thai general election for the Move Forward Party in Bangkok's 13th constituency. He won and was elected to the 2023 Thai House of Representatives. Following the dissolution of the Party by order of the Constitutional Court in 2024, He joined along with the party's remaining lawmakers, transferred to the People's Party. He then got re-elected in the 2026 Thai general election with 44,511 votes, outwinning the other 15 candidates.
