= Sophon Saram =

Thai politician (born 1959)

Sophon Saram MPCh MVM
- โสภณ ซารัมย์
- Sophon in 2026

Speaker of the House of Representatives; President of the National Assembly
- Incumbent
- Assumed office 16 March 2026
- Monarch: Vajiralongkorn
- Prime Minister: Anutin Charnvirakul
- Preceded by: Wan Muhamad Noor Matha

Deputy Prime Minister of Thailand
- In office 19 September 2025 – 16 March 2026
- Prime Minister: Anutin Charnvirakul

Minister of Transport
- In office 20 December 2008 – 9 August 2011
- Prime Minister: Abhisit Vejjajiva
- Preceded by: Santi Promphat
- Succeeded by: Sukampol Suwannathat

Deputy Minister of Transport
- In office 24 September 2008 – 2 December 2008
- Prime Minister: Somchai Wongsawat

Member of the House of Representatives
- Incumbent
- Assumed office 6 January 2001
- Constituency: See list: Buriram 6th District (2001–2006); Buriram 4th District (2007–2011; 2019–2023); Buriram 3th District (2011–2013); Buriram 5th District (2026–present)

Personal details
- Born: 31 March 1959 (age 67) Lam Plai Mat district, Buriram province, Thailand
- Party: Bhumjaithai
- Spouse: Areeyaporn Saram
- Education: Buriram Rajabhat University
- Occupation: Politician

Sophon Saram (Thai: โสภณ ซารัมย์; born 31 March 1959) is a Thai politician and former teacher, serving as the Speaker of the House of Representatives since March 2026. Sophon is a member of the Bhumjaithai party.

== Career ==
Sophon was elected Speaker on 15 March 2026.

== Awards ==
- Knight Grand Cordon of the Order of the White Elephant (2009)
- Knight Grand Cordon of the Order of the Crown of Thailand (2008)
