= Matubhum Party =

Matubhum Party พรรคมาตุภูมิ Motherland Party
- Malay name: ڤرتي تانه اير/ڤرتي ماتوبهوم; Parti Tanah Air/Parti Matubhum
- Leader: Sonthi Boonyaratglin
- Secretary-General: Udomsak Srisutthiwa
- Founded: 3 September 2008
- Dissolved: 27 December 2018
- Headquarters: Bueng Kum, Bangkok, Thailand
- Ideology: Conservatism; Islamic democracy Economic liberalism Patani Malay interests Anti-Zionism
- Political position: Centre-right
- Religion: Islam

Website
- http://www.matubhum.or.th/

The Matubhum Party (Thai: พรรคมาตุภูมิ, Phak Matubhum, English: Motherland Party) was a minor political party in Thailand, founded in November 2008. It used to mainly represent the interests of the Muslim minority in Thailand Southern provinces. It was led by General Sonthi Boonyaratglin.

The forerunner of the Matubhum Party was the Wadah faction (Arab for Unity), initially a cross-party group of Muslim parliamentarians led by Wan Muhamad Noor Matha. The majority of the Wadah faction joined the New Aspiration Party and later the Thai Rak Thai Party of Prime Minister Thaksin Shinawatra, to achieve improvements for the Muslim population in the South. After Thaksin's use of brutal force against the insurgency in the three southernmost provinces, the faction fell out with Thaksin and the Thai Rak Thai Party. After the 2006 Thai coup d'état, most Wadah members joined the Neutral Democratic Party and were later spread among the Puea Pandin Party, the Ratsadon Party, and the Pheu Thai Party. In November 2008, the Muslim politicians formed the Matubhum Party.

General Sonthi Boonyaratglin, from 2005 to 2007 was the Commander-in-Chief of the Army, leader of the 2006 coup d'état, and chairman of the military junta, joined the party in November 2009, and immediately became party leader. Sonthi oriented the party on neutrality between "Red Shirts" and "Yellow Shirts" and reconciliation of the Southern Muslims with Buddhist Thais, especially the Islamist rebels and the government.

In the 2011 general election, the party won two seats, one for the party-list and one constituency-based in Pattani Province. It was in the opposition against the government of Yingluck Shinawatra.

The Matubhum Party was dissolved on 27 December 2018. Most of its members joined the Prachachart Party.
