= Pisarn Wattanawongkiri =

Leadership roles

General Pisarn Wattanawongkiri
- พิศาล วัฒนวงษ์คีรี

Member of the House of Representatives
- In office 14 May 2023 – 14 October 2024

Personal details
- Political party: Pheu Thai (until 14 October 2024)

Pisarn Wattanawongkiri (Thai: พิศาล วัฒนวงษ์คีรี) is a Thai former politician and military officer who served as a member of the House of Representatives from 2023 to 2024. A member of the Pheu Thai Party, Pisarn was the Fourth Army Region commander in Southern Thailand during the 25 October 2004 Tak Bai massacre, which killed 85 people.

== Trial and flight ==
He is one of seven defendants being sued by the families of 48 protesters who were killed. On 1 October 2024, the Narathiwat Provincial Court issued an arrest warrant for Pisarn. In October 2024, Pisarn was granted leave from Thailand for medical reasons, with the Tak Bai case set to reach its statute of limitations on 25 October.

On 14 October 2024, Pisarn resigned from the Pheu Thai Party and subsequently lost his status as a member of parliament.

On 28 October 2024, the Narathiwat Provincial Court dropped its case against Pisarn and the other officials, citing that they were unable to be arrested and brought to court before the expiry of the statute of limitations.
