= Prachachat Party =

Prachachat Party พรรคประชาชาติ
- Malay name: Parti Ummah ڤارتي اومة
- Abbreviation: PCC
- Leader: Tawee Sodsong
- Secretary-General: Sugarno Matha
- Spokesperson: Kamonsak Leewamo
- Founder: Surapol Nakavanich; Wan Muhamad Noor Matha
- Founded: 31 October 2018; 7 years ago
- Split from: Pheu Thai Party; Matubhum Party (partial)
- Headquarters: Bangkok
- Membership: 24,439
- Ideology: Social democracy Social conservatism Islamic democracy Multiculturalism; Malay minority interests
- Political position: Fiscal: Centre-left; Social: Right-wing
- Colours: Gold
- House of Representatives: 5 / 500
- PAO Presidents (Close to the Party): 2 / 76

Website
- prachachat.org

The Prachachat Party (Thai: พรรคประชาชาติ, lit. 'Nation Party' or 'National Party'; Malay: ڤارتي اومة Parti Umat) is a political party representing Malay minority interests in Thailand founded in 2018 by Wan Muhamad Noor Matha and Surapol Nakavanich. The founding members were former members of Pheu Thai Party. Due to its party leader becoming the new Speaker of the House, the executive board was dissolved in early July 2023. Its secretary general, Tawee Sodsong, was later elected as the new leader and his previous post was taken by Sugarno Matha, Wan Noor's brother.

The party tends to be more popular among Thai Malays, mainly in the provinces near the border with Malaysia (Yala and parts of Pattani and Narathiwat).

== Election results ==
=== General elections ===
Election	Total seats won	Popular vote	Share of votes	Seat change	Outcome of election	Election leader
2019	7 / 500	481,490	1.35%	▲7 seats	Opposition	Wan Muhamad Noor Matha
2023	9 / 500	311,057	0.79%	▲2 seats	Junior partner in governing coalition (2023-2025)	Wan Muhamad Noor Matha
2023	9 / 500	311,057	0.79%	▲2 seats	Opposition (since 2025)	Wan Muhamad Noor Matha
2026	5 / 500	309,654	0.85%	▼4 seats	Junior partner in governing coalition	Wan Muhamad Noor Matha

== Prachachat Party Speaker ==
Name	Portrait	Start Date	End Date	Election
Wan Muhamad Noor Matha		5 July 2023	12 December 2025	2023 (26th)
