= Ethnic Protection Act =

Parliament of Thailand
- Long title: Bill on the Protection and Promotion of Ethnic Ways of Life
- Territorial extent: Thailand
- Considered by: House of Representatives; Senate of Thailand
- Signed by: Vajiralongkorn
- Signed: 18 September 2025
- Commenced: 19 September 2025

Legislative history
- Second reading: 5 February 2025
- Third reading: 5 February 2025
- First reading: 17 February 2025
- Second reading: 8 April 2025
- Third reading: 8 April 2025
- Status: In force

The Act on the Protection and Promotion of Ethnic Ways of Life (Thai: พระราชบัญญัติคุ้มครองและส่งเสริมวิถีชีวิตกลุ่มชาติพันธุ์), commonly known as the Ethnic Protection Act, is a Thai law to recognize and enshrine the rights of ethnic communities in Thailand.

== Background ==
As of May 2025, Thailand has an indigenous population of 6 million. These include over 60 ethnic groups, including Moken, Mlabri, Karen, and Mani. Indigenous peoples in Thailand face discrimination and eviction from ancestral lands as a result of modern conservation laws, and include a large number of stateless individuals.

== Legislative history ==
The House of Representatives has approved the bill that the special committee has completed its consideration.

The bill does not include the term "indigenous peoples", which serves as a point of contention for lawmakers.

The Senate has voted to accept the principle and set up a 27-member special committee. The meeting then resolved to approve the bill amendments before sending it to the House of Representatives for further consideration. Later, in the House of Representatives meeting, the meeting resolved to approve the Senate's amendments before submitting it for royal endorsement to be enacted into law.

On September 18, 2025, the Royal Gazette published the Ethnic Groups Protection and Promotion of Lifestyle Act B.E. 2025, which came into effect the following day, September 19, 2025.
