= Pichet Chuamuangpan =

Thai politician

- พิเชษฐ์ เชื้อเมืองพาน
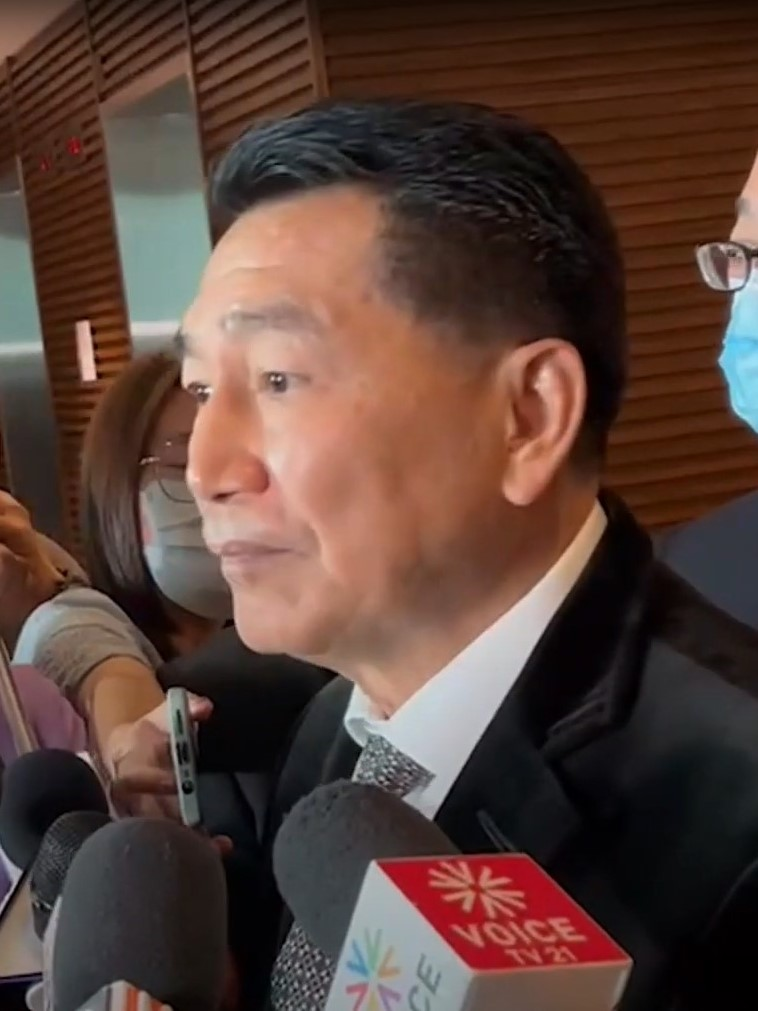

First Deputy Speaker of the House of Representatives
- In office 13 September 2024 – 1 August 2025
- Monarch: Vajiralongkorn
- Prime Minister: Srettha Thavisin; Paetongtarn Shinawatra

Personal details
- Born: January 20, 1963 (age 63)
- Party: Pheu Thai

Pichet Chuamuangpan (Thai: พิเชษฐ์ เชื้อเมืองพาน; born 20 January 1963) is a Thai politician, former First Deputy Speaker of the House of Representatives of Thailand. Pichet is a former member of the Pheu Thai Party.
