= Speaker of the House of Representatives (Thailand) =

Speaker of House of Representatives ประธานสภาผู้แทนราษฎร
- Seal of the National Assembly of Thailand

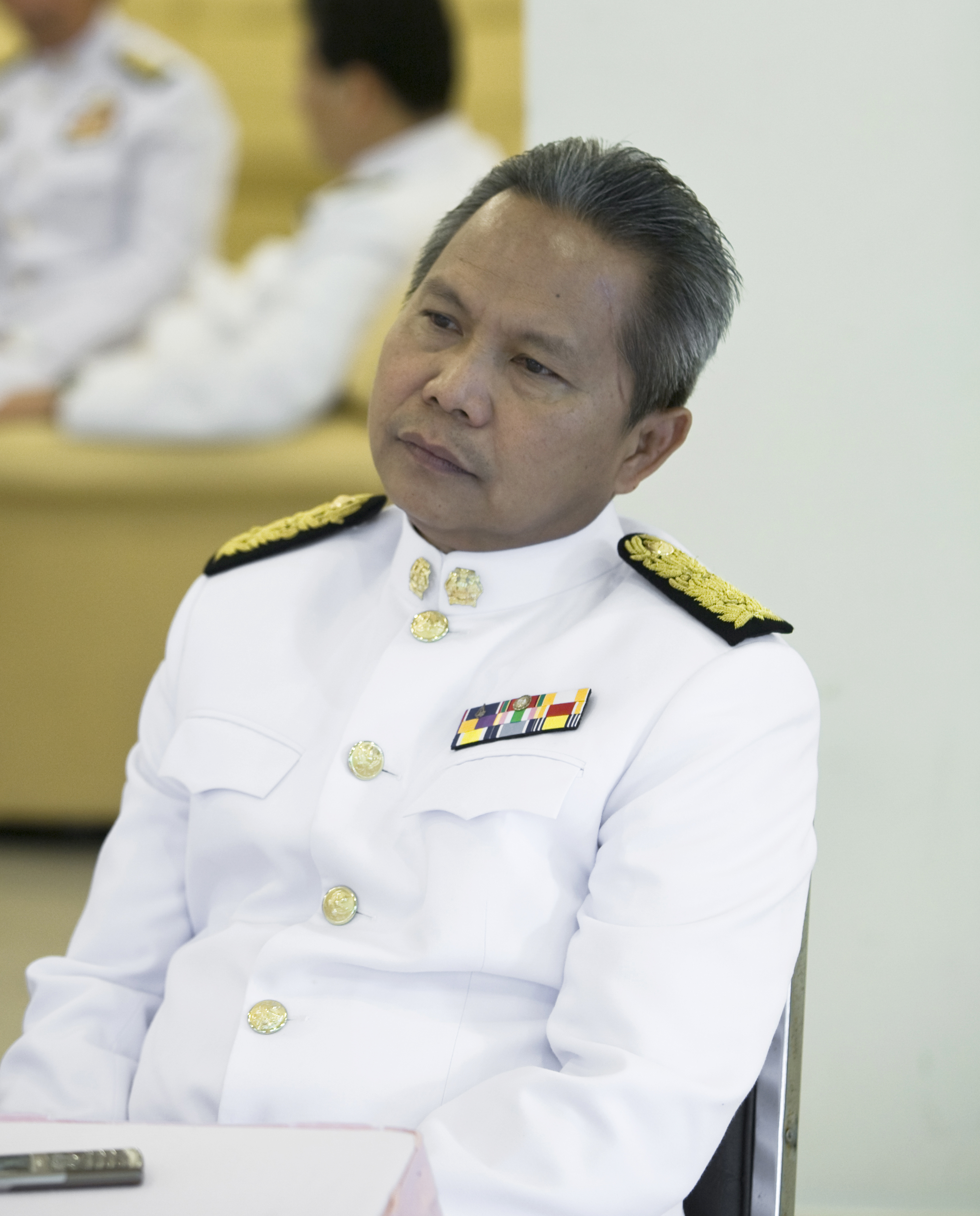
- Incumbent; Sophon Saram since 16 March 2026
- House of Representatives; Office of the Speaker of the House of Representatives
- Style: Mr. Speaker or Mr. President (informal); The Honourable (formal)
- Status: Presiding officer
- Member of: National Assembly; House of Representatives
- Seat: Sappaya-Sapasathan
- Nominator: Vote within the House of Representatives
- Appointer: Monarch
- Term length: According to the term of the House of Representatives
- Constituting instrument: Constitution of Thailand
- Inaugural holder: Chaophraya Thammasakmontri
- Formation: 28 June 1932; 94 years ago
- Salary: ฿75,590 monthly

The Speaker of the House of Representatives (Thai: ประธานสภาผู้แทนราษฎร, RTGS: Prathan Sapha Phuthaen Ratsadon, pronounced [prā.tʰāːn sā.pʰāː pʰûː.tʰɛ̄ːn râːt.sā.dɔ̄ːn]) is the presiding officer of the lower chamber of the National Assembly of Thailand. The Speaker of the House of Representatives is also the ex officio President of the National Assembly of Thailand. The Speaker of the House of Representatives is an MP, usually from the majority party in the House of Representatives. The Speaker or the President is elected at the beginning of a House session immediately after an election, there are no term limits for the office.

== History ==
The office of the Speaker was first established in 1932, with the establishment of the first legislature of Thailand. The office of the President of the People's Assembly of Siam was first occupied by Chaophraya Thammasakmontri (Sanan Thephasadin na Ayutthaya).

== Powers ==
The Speaker is entrusted with certain legislative powers, as it is his main role to ensure all the legislative process is followed. The Speaker is assisted by two Deputy Speakers. The Speaker must act impartially on all matters and therefore cannot be a member of an executive committee of a political party, this also apply to his deputies.

His duties include:

- Filling a vacancy of a Party list MP, by submitting a name on the list for publication in the Royal Gazette.
- Submitting to the King the name of the Prime Minister-elect to be formally appointed, then countersigning it.
- Countersigning the King's appointment of the Leader of the Opposition.
- Being an ex officio member of the Selection committee for:
  - Constitutional Court Judges
  - Election Commissioners
  - Ombudsmen
  - National Anti-Corruption Commissioners

== List of speakers of the House of Representatives ==
No.	Portrait	Name (Birth–Death)	Term of office		Party	House
No.	Portrait	Name (Birth–Death)	Took office	Left office	Party	House
1		Chaophraya Thammasakmontri เจ้าพระยาธรรมศักดิ์มนตรี (1877–1943)	28 June 1932	1 September 1932	Independent	Provisional
2		Chaophraya Phichaiyat เจ้าพระยาพิชัยญาติ (1875–1946)	2 September 1932	10 December 1933	Independent	Provisional
(1)		Chaophraya Thammasakmontri เจ้าพระยาธรรมศักดิ์มนตรี (1877–1943)	15 December 1933	26 February 1934	Independent	1st
3		Phraya Sorayuthaseni พระยาศรยุทธเสนี (1888–1962)	26 February 1934	22 September 1934	People's	1st
4		Chaophraya Sri Thammathibet เจ้าพระยาศรีธรรมาธิเบศ (1885–1976)	22 September 1934	31 July 1936	Independent	1st
5		Phraya Manwaratchasewi พระยามานวราชเสวี (1890–1984)	3 August 1936	24 June 1943	Independent	1st
5		Phraya Manwaratchasewi พระยามานวราชเสวี (1890–1984)	3 August 1936	24 June 1943	Independent	2nd
5		Phraya Manwaratchasewi พระยามานวราชเสวี (1890–1984)	3 August 1936	24 June 1943	Independent	3rd
(3)		Phraya Sorayuthaseni พระยาศรยุทธเสนี (1888–1962)	6 July 1943	24 June 1944	People's	3rd
(5)		Phraya Manwaratchasewi พระยามานวราชเสวี (1890–1984)	2 July 1944	3 June 1946	Independent	3rd
(5)		Phraya Manwaratchasewi พระยามานวราชเสวี (1890–1984)	2 July 1944	3 June 1946	Independent	4th
6		Kasem Boonsri เกษม บุญศรี (1905–1988)	4 June 1946	10 May 1947	Democrat	4th
7		Pheng Srichan พึ่ง ศรีจันทร์ (1907–1992)	13 May 1947	8 November 1947	Independent	4th
(6)		Kasem Boonsri เกษม บุญศรี (1905–1988)	20 February 1948	14 June 1949	Democrat	5th
8		Phraya Thammanithet พระราชธรรมนิเทศ (1891–1965)	15 June 1949	29 November 1951	Independent	5th
9		Phra Prachonpachanuk พระประจนปัจจนึก (1892–1970)	1 December 1951	16 September 1957	Independent	6th
9		Phra Prachonpachanuk พระประจนปัจจนึก (1892–1970)	1 December 1951	16 September 1957	Independent	7th
9		Phra Prachonpachanuk พระประจนปัจจนึก (1892–1970)	1 December 1951	16 September 1957	Independent	8th
10		Luang Sutthisanronnakon หลวงสุทธิสารรณกร (1901–1968)	20 September 1957	14 December 1957	Independent	—
(9)		Phra Prachonpachanuk พระประจนปัจจนึก (1892–1970)	27 December 1957	20 October 1958	Independent	9th
11		Siri Siriyothin ศิริ สิริโยธิน (1915–1979)	10 February 1969	17 November 1971	United Thai People's	10th
12		Prasit Kanchanawat ประสิทธิ์ กาญจนวัฒน์ (1915–1999)	7 February 1975	12 January 1976	Social Nationalist	11th
13		Uthai Pimjaichon อุทัย พิมพ์ใจชน (born 1938)	19 April 1976	6 October 1976	Democrat	12th
14		Boontheng Thongsawat บุญเท่ง ทองสวัสดิ์ (1912–1999)	9 May 1979	19 March 1983	Social Action	13th
(13)		Uthai Pimjaichon อุทัย พิมพ์ใจชน (born 1938)	27 April 1983	1 May 1986	Progress	14th
15		Chuan Leekpai ชวน หลีกภัย (born 1938)	4 August 1986	29 April 1988	Democrat	15th
16		Panja Kesornthong ปัญจะ เกสรทอง (born 1946)	3 August 1988	23 February 1991	Thai Nation	16th
17		Arthit Ourairat อาทิตย์ อุไรรัตน์ (born 1938)	3 April 1992	30 June 1992	Justice Unity	17th
18		Marut Bunnag มารุต บุนนาค (1924–2022)	22 September 1992	19 May 1995	Democrat	18th
19		Booneua Prasertsuwan บุญเอื้อ ประเสริฐสุวรรณ (1919–2016)	11 July 1995	27 September 1996	Thai Nation	19th
20		Wan Muhamad Noor Matha วันมูหะมัดนอร์ มะทา (born 1944)	24 November 1996	27 June 2000	New Aspiration	20th
21		Bhichai Rattakul พิชัย รัตตกุล (1924–2022)	30 June 2000	9 November 2000	Democrat	20th
(13)		Uthai Pimjaichon อุทัย พิมพ์ใจชน (born 1938)	6 February 2001	5 January 2005	Thai Rak Thai	21st
22		Pokin Palakul โภคิน พลกุล (born 1952)	8 March 2005	24 February 2006	Thai Rak Thai	22nd
23		Yongyuth Tiyapairat ยงยุทธ ติยะไพรัช (born 1961)	24 January 2008	30 April 2008	People's Power	23rd
24		Chai Chidchob ชัย ชิดชอบ (1928–2020)	15 May 2008	10 May 2011	People's Power (until 2008)	23rd
24		Chai Chidchob ชัย ชิดชอบ (1928–2020)	15 May 2008	10 May 2011	Bhumjaithai (from 2008)	23rd
25		Somsak Kiatsuranont สมศักดิ์ เกียรติสุรนนท์ (born 1954)	3 August 2011	9 December 2013	Pheu Thai	24th
(15)		Chuan Leekpai ชวน หลีกภัย (born 1938)	28 May 2019	20 March 2023	Democrat	25th
(20)		Wan Muhamad Noor Matha วันมูหะมัดนอร์ มะทา (born 1944)	5 July 2023	12 December 2025	Prachachat	26th
26		Sophon Saram โสภณ ซารัมย์ (born 1959)	16 March 2026	Incumbent	Bhumjaithai	27th

== Sources ==
- Various editions of The Europa World Year Book
