= Wan Muhamad Noor Matha =

Thai politician (born 1944)

Wan Muhamad Noor Matha MPCh MVM PBh
- วันมูหะมัดนอร์ มะทา
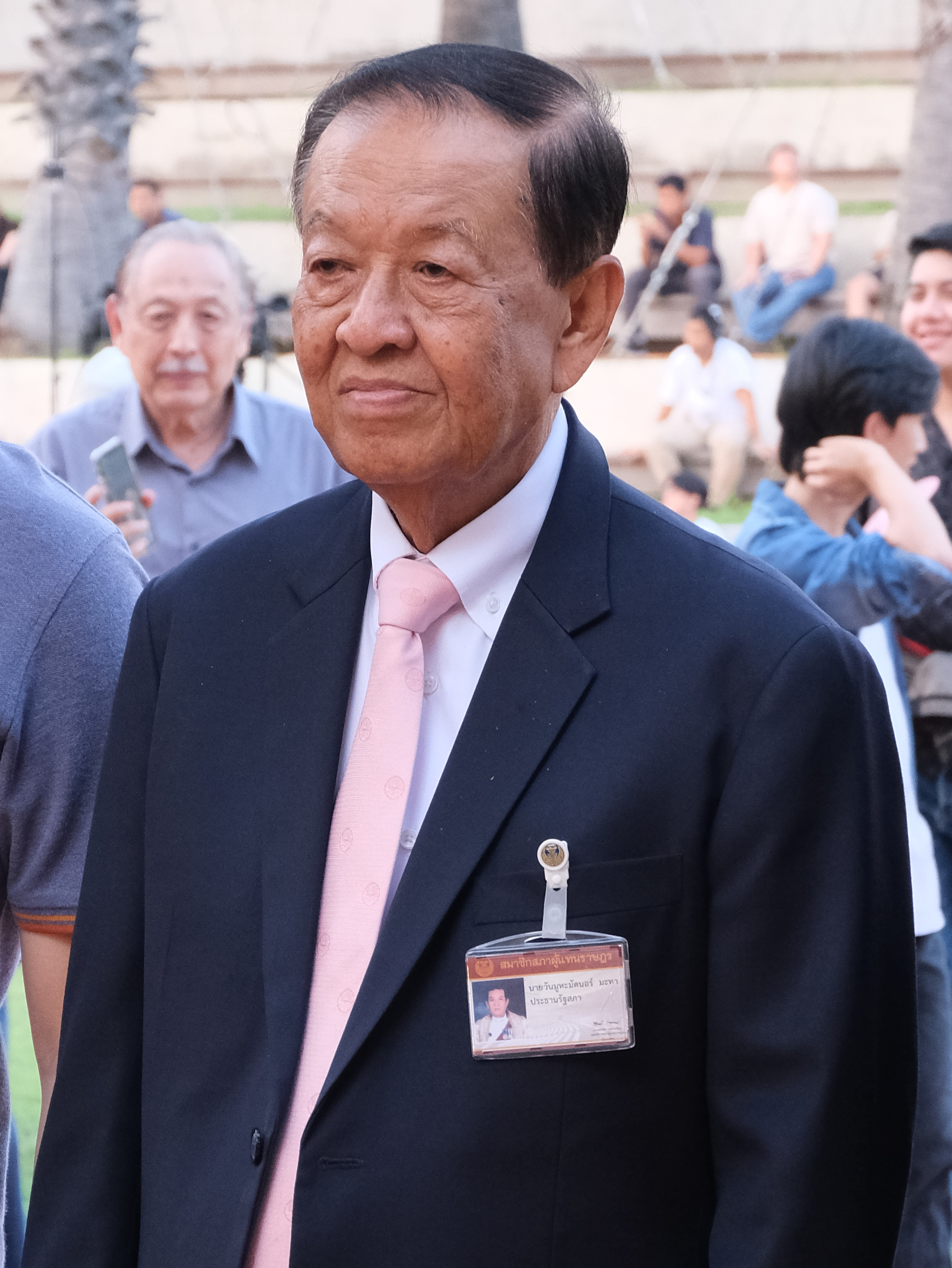
- Wan Noor in 2023

Speaker of the House of Representatives; President of the National Assembly
- In office 5 July 2023 – 12 December 2025
- Monarch: Vajiralongkorn
- Prime Minister: Prayut Chan-o-cha; Srettha Thavisin; Phumtham Wechayachai (acting); Paetongtarn Shinawatra; Suriya Juangroongruangkit (acting); Anutin Charnvirakul
- Preceded by: Chuan Leekpai
- Succeeded by: Sophon Saram
- In office 24 November 1996 – 27 June 2000
- Monarch: Bhumibol Adulyadej
- Prime Minister: Banharn Silpa-archa; Chavalit Yongchaiyudh; Chuan Leekpai
- Preceded by: Booneua Prasertsuwan
- Succeeded by: Bhichai Rattakul

Deputy Prime Minister of Thailand
- In office 10 March 2004 – 6 October 2004
- Prime Minister: Thaksin Shinawatra

Minister of Agriculture and Cooperatives
- In office 6 October 2004 – 11 March 2005
- Prime Minister: Thaksin Shinawatra
- Preceded by: Somsak Thepsuthin
- Succeeded by: Sudarat Keyuraphan

Minister of Interior
- In office 3 October 2002 – 10 March 2004
- Prime Minister: Thaksin Shinawatra
- Preceded by: Purachai Piamsomboon
- Succeeded by: Pokin Palakul

Minister of Transport
- In office 17 February 2001 – 3 October 2002
- Prime Minister: Thaksin Shinawatra
- Preceded by: Suthep Thaugsuban
- Succeeded by: Suriya Juangroongruangkit
- In office 13 July 1995 – 24 November 1996
- Prime Minister: Banharn Silpa-archa
- Preceded by: Vichit Suraphongchai
- Succeeded by: Suwat Liptapanlop

Leader of the Prachachat Party
- In office 31 October 2018 – 3 July 2023
- Preceded by: Position established
- Succeeded by: Tawee Sodsong

Personal details
- Born: 11 May 1944 (age 82) Mueang Yala, Yala, Thailand
- Party: Prachachat
- Other political affiliations: Social Action (until 1984); Democrat (1985–1987); Solidarity (1987–1992); New Aspiration (1992–2002); Thai Rak Thai (2002–2006); People's Power (2007–2008); Matubhum (2010–2012); Pheu Thai (2012–2018)
- Education: Chulalongkorn University
- Occupation: Politician; lecturer

Military service
- Allegiance: Thailand
- Branch/service: Volunteer Defense Corps
- Rank: VDC General

Wan Muhamad Noor Matha (Thai: วันมูหะมัดนอร์ มะทา; Thai pronunciation: [wān.muː.hà.mát.nɔː má.tʰāː]; RTGS: Wanmuhamatno Matha), also called Wan Noor, (Thai: วันนอร์; Thai pronunciation: [wān.nɔː]; RTGS: Wan No; born 11 May 1944) is a Thai politician who is served as speaker of the House of Representatives of Thailand from 2023 to 2025. In addition, he has also held several executive positions such as the minister of the interior and deputy prime minister. He also served as the speaker of the House of Representatives from 1996 to 2000, becoming the first Thai Muslim, ethnic Malay, and individual of ethnic minority descent who served as House speaker in non-consecutive terms.

In addition, he is also the founder of Wahdah, a small political faction grouping of minority ethnic Malay-Muslim politicians hailing from the Southern provinces and is a former university lecturer at Songkhla Rajabhat University and Thaksin University.

== Education ==
Wan Muhamad Noor Matha firstly attended primary school at Ban Sateng School, Yala Province, then he furthered his lower secondary education at Kanaratbamrung School, also in Yala Province and later finished his upper secondary education at the Islamic College of Thailand in Bangkok.

After that he received a Bachelor's degree of Education at Chulalongkorn University with a Ministry of Interior scholarship and had a Master's degree in the Faculty of Education (Educational Administration) from the aforementioned university as well.

== Careers ==
He began to serve as a teacher and was appointed head teacher at Attarkiah Academy in Narathiwat Province when he was only 20 years old. In 1969, he moved to become a teacher at Songkhla Teachers College (currently Songkhla Rajabhat University). In 1975, he was a professor of the Faculty of Education, Srinakharinwirot University, Songkhla (now Thaksin University) and is a special professor Faculty of Education at Prince of Songkla University as well.

Then in the year 1978 he was appointed Vice President of Songkhla Teacher College.

== Political career ==
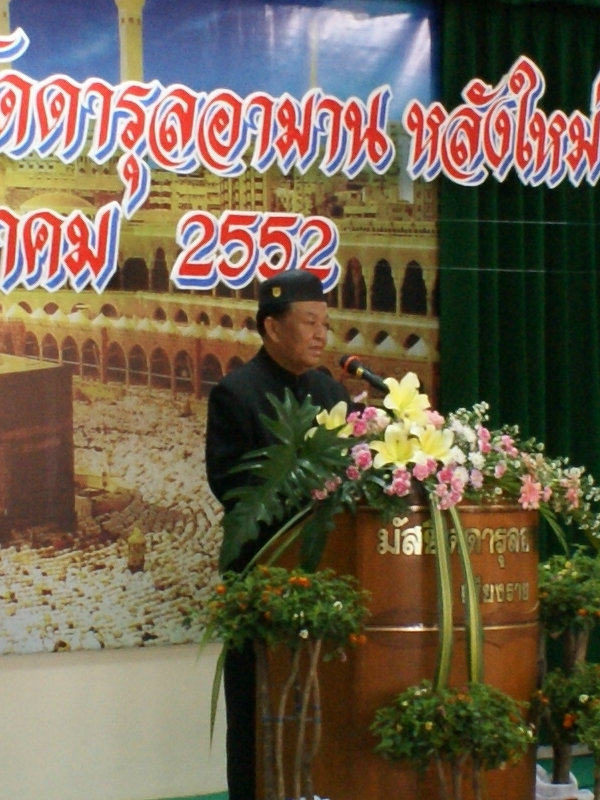
Wan Muhamad at Ban Hoe Mosque, Chiang Rai in 2009

He was elected to the Thai House of Representatives in 1979, representing Yala Province and the Social Action Party until 1984. He moved to the Democrat Party in 1986, to the Solidarity Party in 1988, and to the New Aspiration Party in 1992. Each time he took a group of representatives from the Muslim-majority provinces of Narathiwat, Pattani and Yala—called "Wahdah Group"—with him. After 1980 he worked in the Ministry of Finance and Industry. From 1994 to 1995, he was appointed Deputy Minister of the Interior and was President (Speaker) of Parliament from November 1996 to June 2000.

When New Aspiration Party dissolved and merged with the Thai Rak Thai party in 2001. He became Minister of Transport and Communications, in October 2002 Minister of the Interior.

As one of 111 executive members of the TRT, he was banned from political activities for five years after the 2006 coup d'état.

After the 2006 Thai coup d'état and Thaksin's fall, Wan Noor was appointed Director of the National Drug Control Centre and promised vigorous action. He initially joined the TRT's successor party People's Power Party in 2008, but at the time a five-year ban on political activity was enforced. The Wahdah Group evolved into the Matubhum Party.

== Honours ==
Wan Muhamad Noor has received the following royal decorations in the Honours System of Thailand:

- 1994 - Knight Grand Cordon (Special Class) of the Most Exalted Order of the White Elephant
- 1993 - Knight Grand Cordon (Special Class) of The Most Noble Order of the Crown of Thailand
- 2003 - Knight Grand Cross of the Most Admirable Order of the Direkgunabhorn

=== Medals ===
- 1983 - Border Service Medal
- 1950 - King Rama IX Coronation Medal
- 1973 - Serving Free People Medal
- 2007 - Red Cross Medal of Appreciation, 1st Class (Gold Medal)

=== Honorary PhD ===
Malaysia :

  - Honorary Doctarate Degree (PhD) from Universiti Kebangsaan Malaysia (UKM) in Islamic Studies (2024)
