= Anti-Discrimination Bill (Thailand) =

Anti-Discrimination Act (draft)

Parliament of Thailand
- Territorial extent: Thailand
- Status: Pending

The Anti-Discrimination Bill is a proposed Thai law to protect people from identity-based social discrimination.

== Legislative history ==
The bill was first proposed in 2019 by civil society organizations. In March 2025, the Department of Rights and Liberties Protection announced the bill was expected to be approved by the Cabinet of Thailand in April 2025.

== Provisions ==
The bill will prohibit discrimination on the basis of race, ethnicity, HIV status, sexuality and gender, disability, legal and socioeconomic status, employment, religion, political affiliation, education, or political beliefs.

The bill was drafted to align with the International Covenant on Civil and Political Rights (ICCPR) and the International Covenant on Economic, Social and Cultural Rights (ICESCR).

== Support ==
The bill is supported by civil society groups in Thailand, including the Foundation for Action on Inclusion Rights (FAIR), People's Movement to Eliminate Discrimination (MovED), and Thai Health Promotion Foundation (ThaiHealth), along with the Office of the United Nations High Commissioner for Human Rights.
