= Songkhla Rajabhat University =

Thai public university

Coordinates: 7°10′20″N 100°36′50″E

Songkhla Rajabhat University (Thai: มหาวิทยาลัยราชภัฏสงขลา) or SKRU is a Thai public university under the Rajabhat University system. The campus is in Songkhla Province, south Thailand.

Songkhla Rajabhat University contains seven faculties: Arts, Agricultural Technology, Education, Humanities and Social Science, Industrial Technology, Management Science, and Science and Technology.

== Faculty of Arts ==
The Faculty of Arts is responsible for supporting local culture and national culture. Dimensions of absorbing arts include Musical Art, Visual Art and Performing Art.

== Faculty of Science and Technology ==
In 2000, Faculty of Science and Technology contained nine programs:

- Food Science
- Chemistry and Applied Chemistry
- Computer
- Environment Science
- Health Science
- Physics and General Science
- Mathematics and Statistics
- Biology and Applied Biology
- Rubber Technology and Polymer
