= Community Liquor Act =

Parliament of Thailand
- Long title: Excise Act (No. 2), B.E. 2568
- Territorial extent: Thailand
- Passed by: House of Representatives
- Passed: 15 January 2025
- Passed by: Senate
- Passed: 10 March 2025
- Royal assent: Maha Vajiralongkorn
- Signed: 2 June 2025
- Commenced: 6 June 2025

Legislative history

First chamber: House of Representatives
- Second reading: 15 January 2025
- Third reading: 15 January 2025

Second chamber: Senate
- First reading: 27 January 2025
- Second reading: 10 March 2025
- Third reading: 10 March 2025
- Status: In force

The Excise Act (No. 2), B.E. 2568 (2025 CE; Thai: พระราชบัญญัติภาษีสรรพสามิต (ฉบับที่ 2) พ.ศ. 2568), commonly referred to as the Community Liquor Act or Community Alcoholic Beverage Act (พระราชบัญญัติสุราชุมชน), is a Thai Act of Parliament to allow small-scale producers to legally possess equipment for and manufacture beer and distilled spirits.

== Background ==
Alcohol production in Thailand is characterized as a monopoly, with the majority of the industry concentrated in Thaibev and Boon Rawd Brewery. Small-scale producers face high barriers to entry, including difficulties to obtain export licenses, high minimum production capacities, and environmental certifications.

Opposition MP and brewer Taopiphop Limjittrakorn was a primary advocate for liberalization of Thailand's alcohol production.

Prime Minister Paetongtarn Shinawatra advocated for the Act as a way of revitalizing Thailand's rural economy and increase competition.

== Legislative history ==
On 15 January 2025, the House of Representatives unanimously passed the Community Liquor Bill 415 to 0, with 5 abstentions. Later on March 10, 2025, the Senate unanimously passed the Community Liquor Bill by a vote of 166 to 3, with 8 abstentions.

On 5 June 2025, the Royal Gazette published the Excise Tax Act (No. 2) B.E. 2025, effective from the day following its publication in the Royal Gazette, i.e. 6 June 2025.

== Provisions ==
The bill includes support for small entrepreneurs, cooperatives, community enterprises, and farmers groups to obtain commercial alcohol production licenses.
