= 2026 in Thailand =

- Decades: 2000s; 2010s; 2020s; 2030s
- See also: Other events of 2026; Timeline of Thai history

The following is a list of events and scheduled events in the year 2026 in Thailand. The year 2026 is reckoned as the year 2569 in Buddhist Era, the Thai calendar.

== Incumbents ==
- King: Vajiralongkorn
- Prime Minister: Anutin Charnvirakul
- Supreme Patriarch: Ariyavongsagatanana (Amborn Ambaro)
- President of the National Assembly: Sophon Saram (Bhumjaithai)

== Events ==
=== January ===
- 2 January – The Royal Gazette officially places the date for a referendum on a new constitution for February 8.
- 6 January – A Thai soldier is injured in mortar shelling blamed on an accident by Cambodian forces along their common border in Ubon Ratchathani province.
- 11 January – Eleven PTT petrol stations in the provinces of Narathiwat, Pattani and Yala are targeted in a series of bomb attacks that leave a police officer and three civilians injured.
- 14 January – A construction crane falls on a passenger train in Sikhio district, Nakhon Ratchasima province, killing 32 people and injuring 66 others.
- 15 January – A construction crane collapses onto vehicles on Rama II Road in Samut Sakhon province, killing two people.
- 20 January –
  - Fourteen Thai nationals believed to have escaped from a scam center in Cambodia are detained after crossing the international border into Aranyaprathet district, Sa Kaeo province.
  - Prime minister Charnvirakul announces the end of a four-month operation to curb drug trafficking, resulting in the seizure of over 330 million methamphetamine tablets and over 3.39 billion baht, the arrest of over 88,000 suspects, and the dismantling of several crime syndicates.
- 20–26 January – 2026 ASEAN Para Games
- 25 January – Authorities reintroduce endangered Indo-Pacific leopard sharks off the coast of Phuket province in efforts to increase the wild populations.
- 29 January – An AT-6TH Wolverine aircraft of the Royal Thai Air Force crashes during a training flight in Chom Thong district, Chiang Mai, killing its two pilots.
- 30 January –
  - Two Thai soldiers are injured in a detonation of unexploded munitions caused by a grassfire near the Cambodia-Thailand border in Nam Yuen district, Ubon Ratchathani province.
  - One person is killed in an explosion at a fireworks factory in Don Chedi district, Suphan Buri province.

=== February ===
- 3 February – Authorities announce the first case of psittacosis in Thailand.
- 4 February – A police officer is injured in a bomb attack on a petrol station in Mueang Pattani district, Pattani province.
- 7 February –
  - The Panamanian-flagged cargo vessel SEALLOYD ARC sinks off Phuket.
  - A crane collapses at a construction site in Asoke, Bangkok, injuring two Burmese workers.
- 8 February –
  - 2026 Thai general election: Prime minister Anutin's Bhumjaithai Party wins a plurality of at least 194 of 500 seats in the House of Representatives.
  - 2026 Thai constitutional referendum: A motion to replace the 2017 constitution passes with the support of two-thirds of voters.
  - A soldier is injured in a bomb attack on a military convoy in Bannang Sata district, Yala province.
- 9 February – A fire at the Chatuchak Weekend Market in Bangkok damages 28 shops.
- 11 February –
  - Three people are injured in a roadside bombing in Rueso district, Narathiwat province.
  - 2026 Hat Yai school shooting: One person is killed while two others are injured in a school shooting in Hat Yai.
  - A Thai soldier is injured after stepping on a landmine near the Cambodia-Thailand border in Kantharalak district, Sisaket province.
- 12 February – A wildfire breaks out at the Sakaerat Environmental Research Station in Nakhon Ratchasima province, affecting 6,400 rai.
- 13 February – The Bhumjaithai Party reaches an agreement to form a coalition government with the Pheu Thai Party.
- 15 February – Seven bomb attacks are made overnight on Yi-ngo and Ra-ngae districts in Narathiwat province.
- 16 February — The Malaysian Communications and Multimedia Commission formally withdraws a defamation case it filed in a Thai court against Australian journalist and Thai resident Murray Hunter over articles published on his Substack newsletter after reaching a settlement.
- 20 February – At least 72 tigers are reported to have died following an outbreak of canine distemper at Tiger Kingdom in Chiang Mai.
- 22 February – The Royal Thai Navy seizes a Cambodian fishing vessel along the maritime boundary between the two countries off the coast of Trat province.
- 25 February – UNESCO announces the honorary recognition of Queen Rambai Barni as a World Important Person on the occasion of the 100th anniversary of her royal initiatives in education, social development, and gender equality. The celebration is based on the centenary of her investiture as Queen.

=== March ===
- 11 March – The Thailand-flagged bulk carrier MV Mayuree Naree is hit by two Iranian missiles shortly after passing the Strait of Hormuz. Twenty people are rescued and three are reported missing after the vessel catches on fire.
- 12 March – The Government of Thailand summons Iran's ambassador, demanding an apology and an explanation for the attack on the bulk carrier MV Mayuree Naree in the waters of the Strait the previous day.
- 15 March – Sophon Saram of the Bhumjaithai Party is elected Speaker of the House of Representatives.
- 17 March – A court in Bangkok sentences eSports players Naphat Warasin and Kong Sutprom to three months' imprisonment for cheating during the 2025 SEA Games.
- 19 March – The House of Representatives reelects Anutin Charnvirakul as prime minister after the latter gains the support of 293 of 498 voting MPs.
- 31 March – The Thailand national football team qualifies for the 2027 AFC Asian Cup after defeating Turkmenistan to finish top of their qualification group.

=== April ===
- 6 April – King Vajiralongkorn administers the oath of office to the cabinet members of Anutin Charnvirakul.

=== May ===
- 5 May – Thailand revokes a 2001 memorandum of understanding with Cambodia aimed at resolving maritime border disputes.
- 11 May – Former prime minister Thaksin Shinawatra is released from prison.
- 15 May – Chadchart Sittipunt resigns as Governor of Bangkok ahead of the upcoming Bangkok gubernatorial election.
- 16 May – A freight train crashes into a bus near Makkasan station in Bangkok, killing at least eight people and injuring 15 others.
- 19 May – The government revises its visa policy and reduces visa-exemption periods for citizens of 93 countries.
- 28 May – The Thai–Myanmar Friendship Bridge No.2 is opened for the first time in more than 10 months.
- 30 May – The inaugural all-star edition of Miss Grand International is held in Bangkok.

=== June ===
- 2 June – Cambodia files a notice to UNCLOS seeking compulsory conciliation of its maritime border dispute with Thailand. On 5 June, Thailand agrees to send two representatives to the UNCLOS negotiations.
- 11 June – The Bangkok South Criminal Court sentences two suspects to death over the 2015 Bangkok bombing.
- 27 June – An Australian national is arrested after the body of 17-year old Tunchanok Donhomla is found in a suitcase in Pattaya.
- 28 June – 2026 Bangkok gubernatorial election

=== July ===
- 2 July – An 11-year-old child crashes a pickup truck into a group of monks on a pilgrimage walk in Mukdahan province, killing 11.
- 5 July – 2026 Bangkok Metropolitan Council election
- 12 July – Forty-one people are killed in a fire at a bar in Bangkok.
- 22 July – Five paramilitary soldiers are killed and six others are injured after militants attack a security checkpoint in Narathiwat province.
- 24 July – The United States imposes a 12.5% tariff on Thailand, citing the presence of alleged forced labour in the supply chain.
- 25 July – The Wat Phra Mahathat temple in Nakhon Si Thammarat is designated as a UNESCO World Heritage Site.
- 26 July – Killings of Diana and Roman Nazimova in Chonburi province.

=== August ===
- 7 August –
  - At least nine people, including the 14-year-old assailant, are killed in a mass shooting in Nonthaburi.
  - A car crashes into a Kanchanaburi childcare center, injuring 16 people.
- 10 August – Former MP Chalong Riewrang is arrested after fatally shooting Thongchai Yenprasert, the president of the Nonthaburi Provincial Administrative Organisation, and injuring his driver outside Thongchai's office.
- 14 August – A French national is released on bail after an antisemitic attack that injured two Israeli women in Ko Pha-ngan.
- 22 August – At least two people are injured in a series of bombing and arson attacks across Narathiwat, Yala and Pattani provinces.
- 24 August – An arson attack is carried out on a convenience store in Pattani province, resulting in two arrests.

=== September ===
- 9 September – A gunman fatally shoots a teacher at a kindergarten in Chonburi province.
- 11 September – Phra Wachirayan Wi, a former abbot at Wat Phutthaisawan in Ayutthaya, is arrested on suspicion of embezzling 100 million baht ($3 million) from the monastery and having inappropriate sexual relations.
- 15 September – Thailand reduces visa-free stays for citizens of 60 countries from 60 days to 30 days.
- 26 September – Following three days of rainfall that resulted in flooding, authorities declare a disaster zone over Bangkok.

=== October ===
- 2 October – The board of Thai Airways International dismisses Chai Eamsiri as CEO.

=== November ===
- 14 November – The inaugural Eurovision Song Contest Asia is held at the One Bangkok arena in Bangkok. Thailand's Mang x Daou finish in second place.
- 15 November – A fire in a building in Phuket kills 11 people and injures 17 others.

=== Scheduled ===
- 11–13 December – The Belgium-based Tomorrowland festival will stage its first Asian edition in Pattaya.

== Art and entertainment ==
- List of Thai submissions for the Academy Award for Best International Feature Film

== Holidays ==
- 1 January – New Year's Day
- 17 February – Chinese New Year
- 3 March – Makha Bucha Day
- 19–20–March – Hari Raya Puasa
- 6 April – Chakri Memorial Day
- 13–15 April – Songkran Festival
- 1 May – Labour Day
- 4 May – Coronation of King Vajiralongkorn Holiday
- 13 May – Royal Ploughing Ceremony
- 31 May – Visakha Bucha Day
- 3 June – Queen Suthida's Birthday
- 28 July – King Vajiralongkorn's Birthday
- 29 July – Asahna Bucha Day
- 12 August – The Queen Mother's Birthday
- 13 October – King Bhumibol Adulyadej Memorial Day
- 23 October – Chulalongkorn Memorial Day
- 5 December – King Bhumibol Adulyadej's Birthday
- 10 December – Constitution Day
- 25 December – Christmas Day
- 31 December – New Year's Eve

== Deaths ==
- 5 January – Induratana Paribatra, 103, royal
- 12 January – Asda Jayanama, 84, diplomat
- 22 January – Bunjop Bunnag, 100, politician, minister of defence (1992).
- 19 February – Jaranthada Karnasuta, 76, politician, member of the Privy Council (since 2016).
- 8 March – Mantana Morakul, 102, singer.
- 5 April – Thitinan Saengnak, 65, MP (2019–2023).
- 11 June – Bajrakitiyabha, 47, princess and diplomat.
- 20 July – Rang Thurapon, 69, MP (since 2023).
- 31 July – Phon Paradraksa, 103, police officer.
- 11 August – Kriang Kalptinan, 73, MP (1995–2006, 2023–2025).
- 19 August – Ray MacDonald, 49, actor.
- 24 September – Piak Poster, 93, filmmaker, film poster artist and actor (The Billionaire).
- 13 November – Praneetsilpa Vacharapol, 94, businesswoman, chairwoman of Thairath (since 1996).
- 17 November – Phira Thetwisan, 47, singer and guitarist (Peacemaker).
