= 2025 Thai Provincial Administrative Organization election =

- 1 February 2025

47 of 76 PAO chief executives 2,316 PAO council members in all 76 provinces
- Turnout: 58.45%
- Results by province

The 2025 Thai Provincial Administrative Organization (PAO) election was a local election held in Thailand on 1 February 2025 to elect 47 of 76 chief executives and 2,316 council members of the PAO in 76 provinces. The Pheu Thai party's directly endorsed and affiliated candidates won the most chief executive seats.

Chief executives were elected in only 47 of the 76 provinces because in the other 29 the incumbent had resigned before the end of the four-year term, which triggered an early election during 2024. Those provinces therefore voted only for council members on 1 February 2025.

This is the fifth PAO election, excluding by-elections for chief executives, since the amendment of the PAO Act (third edition) in 2003 to allow direct elections for PAO chief executives. Prior to the amendment, chief executives were chosen by council members.

Many chief executive candidates were incumbents. Out of the 76 provinces, 12 chief executives have held the position for over 20 years.

== Results ==
In the 47 provinces where PAO chief executive elections were held, unofficial results as of 23:00 local time were:

Political Party (including affiliated local groups) (Note: Tallies of this election vary between sources because most candidates did not stand under a national party label. Of the 47 successful chief executive candidates, 12 were nominated by a political party and the remainder stood as independents or under locally registered groups, so any party total depends on how those groups are attributed to national parties.)	PAO Chief Executives
Pheu Thai	16 provinces
Bhumjaithai	14 provinces
United Thai Nation	4 provinces
Democrat	3 provinces
Prachachat	2 provinces
Chart Thai Pattana	2 provinces
People's	1 province
Palang Pracharath	1 province
Kla Tham	1 province
Independent	3 provinces

The ruling Pheu Thai Party led in unofficial results. The People's Party claimed its first victory in a provincial-level election, with the election of Weeradej Phupisit as PAO chief executive of Lamphun province. Weeradej defeated former PAO chief executive and cabinet minister Anusorn Wongwan. Neither of the People's Party's progressive predecessors (Future Forward Party and Move Forward Party) won a PAO leadership election.

The Election Commission certified the chief executive results in three batches: ten provinces were announced on 24 February 2025, 19 on 25 February and the remaining 18 on 3 March.

=== Turnout ===
On 3 February 2025 the Secretary-General of the Election Commission (EC), Sawaeng Boonmee, published final figures for both contests. Turnout fell short of the 65 per cent the EC had projected on polling day.

Turnout and ballot composition
	Chief executive (47 provinces)	Council (76 provinces)
Registered voters	27,991,587	47,124,842
Votes cast	16,362,185 (58.45%)	26,418,754 (56.06%)
Valid ballots	14,272,694 (87.23%)	23,131,324 (87.56%)
Spoiled ballots	931,290 (5.69%)	1,488,086 (5.63%)
None of the above	1,158,201 (7.08%)	1,799,344 (6.81%)

Among the 47 provinces electing a chief executive, turnout was highest in Lamphun at 73.43 per cent, followed by Nakhon Nayok (73.00%), Phatthalung (72.56%), Narathiwat (68.42%) and Mukdahan (68.03%). (Note: The Election Commission's ranking was compiled before Chiang Mai's official count was published. That count gives a Chiang Mai turnout of 68.45 per cent, which would place it fourth.)

=== Chief executives elected ===
Province	Chief Executive Candidate	Political Party/Local Group	Affiliated Political Party
Northern Provinces
Chiang Mai	Pichai Lertpongadisorn	Pheu Thai	
Chiang Rai	Atitathorn Wanchaitanawong	Independent	Bhumjaithai
Lampang	Tuangrat Lohsunthorn	Pheu Thai	
Lamphun	Weeradej Phupisit	People's	
Phichit	Krit Pensupa	Baan See Keaw Group	Bhumjaithai
Nan	Nopparat Thawong	Pheu Thai	
Phrae	Anuwat Wongwan	Pheu Thai	
Mae Hong Son	Akkharadet Wanchaitanawong	Dee Tor Nuang Group	Bhumjaithai
Northeastern Provinces
Nakhon Ratchasima	Yolda Wangsupakitkosol	Pheu Thai	
Nakhon Phanom	Anuchit Hongsadi	Pheu Thai	
Bueng Kan	Waenfa Thongsri	Bueng Kan Bueng Jai Group	Bhumjaithai
Buriram	Phusit Lekudakorn	Khon Buriram Group	Bhumjaithai
Maha Sarakham	Phonphat Charassathien	Pheu Thai	
Mukdahan	Weerapong Thongpha	Mukdahan's Future Group	Palang Pracharath
Sisaket	Wichit Traisornkul	Khon Thong Tin Group	Bhumjaithai
Sakon Nakhon	Naruemon Sapsor	Pheu Thai	
Nong Khai	Wutthikrai Changlek	Pheu Thai	
Nong Bua Lamphu	Saranya Suwanaprom	Nong Bua Khunatham Group	Kla Tham
Amnat Charoen	Panat Phanwan	Bhumjaithai Amnat Group	Bhumjaithai
Central Provinces
Chachoengsao	Kulayut Chaichang	Ruam Jai Pattana Group	Pheu Thai
Chonburi	Wittaya Khunpluem	Rao Rak Chonburi Group	Pheu Thai
Prachinburi	Napaphat Anchasanichmon	Pheu Thai	
Chanthaburi	Thanapon Kitchakan	Independent	Democrat
Nakhon Nayok	Nida Khanayngam	Independent	Palang Pracharath
Nonthaburi	Thongchai Yenprasert	Phung Luang Group	Pheu Thai
Prachuap Khiri Khan	Sarawut Lim Arunrak	Friends of Chalermchai Group	Democrat
Lopburi	Orapin Jiraphanvanich	Independent	Bhumjaithai
Samut Prakan	Soonthorn Pansaengthong	Progressive Samut Prakan Group	Palang Pracharath
Samut Sakhon	Udom Kraiwatnusorn	Workers' Group	Pheu Thai
Samut Songkhram	Jetsada Yanpraphasiri	Khon Kong Prachachon Khon Samut Songkhram Group	Kla Tham
Saraburi	Sanya Boon-Lhong	Independent	Palang Pracharath
Sing Buri	Supawat Tianthaworn	Independent	Palang Pracharath
Suphan Buri	Udom Prongfa	Chart Thai Pattana	
Nakhon Pathom	Jirawat Sasomsub	Chao Baan Group	Chart Thai Pattana
Trat	Wichian Supacharoen	Children of Trat Group	Pheu Thai
Rayong	Piya Pitutecha	Palang Chang Group	Democrat
Southern Provinces
Krabi	Somsak Kittithornkul	Rak Krabi Group	Bhumjaithai
Narathiwat	Ku Seng Yao Aha San	Independent	Prachachat
Pattani	Set Alyufree	Independent	Prachachat
Phang Nga	Bamrung Piyanamvanich	Rak Phang Nga Pattana Phang Nga Group	Democrat
Phatthalung	Wisut Thammaphet	Palang Phattalung Group	United Thai Nation
Yala	Mukhtar Mata	Yala Pattana Group	Prachachat
Satun	Sumrit Liangprasit	Satun Santitham Group	Bhumjaithai
Trang	Bunleng Lo Sathanapornpipit	Nayok Boonleng's Group	Democrat
Phuket	Rewat Areerob	Phuket Yaddai Group	Democrat
Surat Thani	Sopha Kanjana	Palang Surat Group	United Thai Nation
Songkhla	Supit Phitaktham	Songkhla Palang Mai Group	Democrat

== Results by province ==
Results are given for the 47 provinces that elected a chief executive on 1 February 2025. Figures are shown only where two independent sources agree on every candidate's total, or where an official count has been located; six provinces are listed without figures because published sources conflict materially. (Note: Published vote totals for Chonburi, Nakhon Ratchasima, Phatthalung, Rayong, Lopburi and Lampang differ between sources, in several cases by more than 10,000 votes, and no official count announcement (form ผ.ถ. 5/8) has been located for these provinces. Figures are therefore omitted rather than given from a single unverified source.) Percentages are shares of valid ballots. (Note: Except where otherwise stated, vote totals are taken from the Thai PBS election dataset, which reports the count as unofficial; the figures used are those in the dataset revision of 11 February 2025. No official announcement of the count has been located for most provinces.)

=== Amnat Charoen ===
Popular vote
Panat Phanwan	46.69%
Danai Mahiphan	25.33%
Maitree Kaewmongkol	15.55%
Chanpen Prasertsri	9.52%
Jirasit Chanthasit	2.25%
Chakat Rungruang	0.66%

2025 Amnat Charoen Provincial Administrative Organization chief executive election
Party	Candidate	Votes	%	±%
Klum Bhumjai Tai Amnat	Panat Phanwan	80,066	46.69	
Pheu Thai	Danai Mahiphan	43,438	25.33	
Klum Prachachon Khon Amnat	Maitree Kaewmongkol	26,669	15.55	
Klum Palang Amnat Charoen	Chanpen Prasertsri	16,331	9.52	
Independent	Jirasit Chanthasit	3,866	2.25	
Independent	Chakat Rungruang	1,131	0.66	
Total votes		171,501	100.00	
Rejected ballots		6,803	3.71	
Blank ballots		4,993	2.72	
Turnout		183,297	61.33	
Registered electors		298,853		

=== Bueng Kan ===
Popular vote
Waenfa Thongsri	56.74%
Phumiphan Boonmatun	40.71%
Chatravut Thongsamrit	2.55%

2025 Bueng Kan Provincial Administrative Organization chief executive election
Party	Candidate	Votes	%	±%
Klum Nakhon Nakha	Waenfa Thongsri	103,973	56.74	
Pheu Thai	Phumiphan Boonmatun	74,611	40.71	
Independent	Chatravut Thongsamrit	4,668	2.55	
Total votes		183,252	100.00	
Registered electors		325,650		

=== Buriram ===
Popular vote
Phusit Lekudakorn	78.48%
Karun Sai-ngam	15.73%
Phimchanok Rattanabannakit	3.62%
Nattakit Lohprasit	2.17%

2025 Buriram Provincial Administrative Organization chief executive election
Party	Candidate	Votes	%	±%
Independent	Phusit Lekudakorn	417,161	78.48	
Independent	Karun Sai-ngam	83,628	15.73	
Independent	Phimchanok Rattanabannakit	19,247	3.62	
Independent	Nattakit Lohprasit	11,521	2.17	
Total votes		531,557	100.00	
Rejected ballots		50,048	7.90	
Blank ballots		51,525	8.14	
Turnout		633,130	50.89	
Registered electors		1,244,105		

=== Chachoengsao ===
Popular vote
Kulayut Chaichang	60.59%
Thammachat Prompitak	24.39%
Phon Maruthaphongsathon	15.02%

2025 Chachoengsao Provincial Administrative Organization chief executive election
Party	Candidate	Votes	%	±%
Klum Ruam Jai Pattana	Kulayut Chaichang	173,008	60.59	
Klum Palang Mai	Thammachat Prompitak	69,629	24.39	
Independent	Phon Maruthaphongsathon	42,899	15.02	
Total votes		285,536	100.00	
Rejected ballots		19,090	5.63	
Blank ballots		34,612	10.20	
Turnout		339,238	58.95	
Registered electors		575,464		

=== Chanthaburi ===
Popular vote
Thanapon Kitchakan	56.66%
Mana Chanasit	31.12%
Chatree Thippayachueajun	7.44%
Khachen Thahun	3.27%
Ladda Chatu-uthaisri	1.52%

2025 Chanthaburi Provincial Administrative Organization chief executive election
Party	Candidate	Votes	%	±%
Independent	Thanapon Kitchakan	131,575	56.66	
People's	Mana Chanasit	72,266	31.12	
Independent	Chatree Thippayachueajun	17,268	7.44	
Klum Plian Chan	Khachen Thahun	7,596	3.27	
Klum Anakhot Chan	Ladda Chatu-uthaisri	3,521	1.52	
Total votes		232,226	100.00	
Rejected ballots		8,297	3.27	
Blank ballots		12,923	5.10	
Turnout		253,446	60.12	
Registered electors		421,578		

=== Chiang Mai ===
Popular vote
Pichai Lertpongadisorn	49.31%
Pun-Arj Chairatana	47.13%
Panom Sriphueat	3.56%

2025 Chiang Mai Provincial Administrative Organization chief executive election
Party	Candidate	Votes	%	±%
Pheu Thai	Pichai Lertpongadisorn	397,250	49.31	
People's	Pun-Arj Chairatana	379,738	47.13	
Independent	Panom Sriphueat	28,703	3.56	
Total votes		805,691	100.00	
Rejected ballots		42,499	4.68	
Blank ballots		60,633	6.67	
Turnout		908,823	68.45	
Registered electors		1,327,696		

(Note: Chiang Mai figures are taken from the official announcement of the count issued by the Chiang Mai Provincial Administrative Organization Election Commission on form ผ.ถ. 5/8.)

=== Chiang Rai ===
Popular vote
Atitathorn Wanchaitanawong	49.68%
Saluckjicht Tiyapairat	46.29%
Jiraporn Muenchaiwong	4.03%

2025 Chiang Rai Provincial Administrative Organization chief executive election
Party	Candidate	Votes	%	±%
Independent	Atitathorn Wanchaitanawong	261,181	49.68	
Independent	Saluckjicht Tiyapairat	243,339	46.29	
Independent	Jiraporn Muenchaiwong	21,184	4.03	
Total votes		525,704	100.00	
Rejected ballots		36,403	6.01	
Blank ballots		43,369	7.16	
Turnout		605,476	65.36	
Registered electors		926,351		

=== Chonburi ===
The election was won by Wittaya Khunpluem. Published vote totals for Chonburi differ substantially between sources and no official count has been located, so figures are not given here.

=== Krabi ===
Popular vote
Somsak Kittithornkul	75.64%
Patipat Kannarong	12.48%
Kitinarong Maisrikrod	11.88%

2025 Krabi Provincial Administrative Organization chief executive election
Party	Candidate	Votes	%	±%
Klum Rak Krabi	Somsak Kittithornkul	132,684	75.64	
Independent	Patipat Kannarong	21,883	12.48	
Klum Krabi Kao Mai	Kitinarong Maisrikrod	20,840	11.88	
Total votes		175,407	100.00	
Rejected ballots		9,221	4.54	
Registered electors		360,480		

=== Lampang ===
The election was won by Tuangrat Lohsunthorn. Published vote totals for Lampang differ substantially between sources and no official count has been located, so figures are not given here.

=== Lamphun ===
Popular vote
Weeradej Phupisit	51.40%
Anusorn Wongwan	48.60%

2025 Lamphun Provincial Administrative Organization chief executive election
Party	Candidate	Votes	%	±%
People's	Weeradej Phupisit	109,372	51.40	
Pheu Thai	Anusorn Wongwan	103,405	48.60	
Total votes		212,777	100.00	
Rejected ballots		15,133	6.24	
Blank ballots		14,478	5.97	
Turnout		242,388	73.43	
Registered electors		330,102		

=== Lopburi ===
The election was won by Orapin Jiraphanvanich. Published vote totals for Lopburi differ substantially between sources and no official count has been located, so figures are not given here.

=== Mae Hong Son ===
Popular vote
Akkharadet Wanchaitanawong	73.02%
Danuphat Chiangchoom	26.98%

2025 Mae Hong Son Provincial Administrative Organization chief executive election
Party	Candidate	Votes	%	±%
Klum Di To Nueang	Akkharadet Wanchaitanawong	71,652	73.02	
Klum Palang Mai Mae Hong Son	Danuphat Chiangchoom	26,481	26.98	
Total votes		98,133	100.00	
Rejected ballots		13,556	11.33	
Blank ballots		7,981	6.67	
Turnout		119,670	65.80	
Registered electors		181,863		

=== Maha Sarakham ===
Popular vote
Phonphat Charassathien	69.52%
Khomkhay Udonpim	24.38%
Phumiphet Pawaputanon Na Mahasarakham	3.89%
Sirirat Buama	1.37%
Piangtawan Ngamnat	0.84%

2025 Maha Sarakham Provincial Administrative Organization chief executive election
Party	Candidate	Votes	%	±%
Pheu Thai	Phonphat Charassathien	283,721	69.52	
Independent	Khomkhay Udonpim	99,474	24.38	
Independent	Phumiphet Pawaputanon Na Mahasarakham	15,863	3.89	
Independent	Sirirat Buama	5,610	1.37	
Independent	Piangtawan Ngamnat	3,425	0.84	
Total votes		408,093	100.00	
Rejected ballots		29,024	6.40	
Blank ballots		16,450	3.63	
Turnout		453,567	59.56	
Registered electors		761,511		

=== Mukdahan ===
Popular vote
Weerapong Thongpha	49.06%
Boonthin Pratoomlee	27.41%
Supot Su-oriyapong	14.84%
Chit Sriyoha Mukdathanaphong	7.88%
Komsan Chaitontueak	0.81%

2025 Mukdahan Provincial Administrative Organization chief executive election
Party	Candidate	Votes	%	±%
Independent	Weerapong Thongpha	85,000	49.06	
Pheu Thai	Boonthin Pratoomlee	47,491	27.41	
People's	Supot Su-oriyapong	25,715	14.84	
Independent	Chit Sriyoha Mukdathanaphong	13,651	7.88	
Independent	Komsan Chaitontueak	1,411	0.81	
Total votes		173,268	100.00	
Rejected ballots		10,080	5.37	
Blank ballots		4,526	2.41	
Turnout		187,874	68.03	
Registered electors		276,181		

=== Nakhon Nayok ===
Popular vote
Nida Khanayngam	49.39%
Jakkapan Jintanapakanont	48.70%
Udomchai Khrualamai	1.22%
Pichet Saknaviporn	0.40%
Adul Yeemin	0.28%

2025 Nakhon Nayok Provincial Administrative Organization chief executive election
Party	Candidate	Votes	%	±%
Independent	Nida Khanayngam	69,202	49.39	
People's	Jakkapan Jintanapakanont	68,244	48.70	
Independent	Udomchai Khrualamai	1,716	1.22	
Independent	Pichet Saknaviporn	557	0.40	
Independent	Adul Yeemin	399	0.28	
Total votes		140,118	100.00	
Registered electors		206,168		

=== Nakhon Pathom ===
Popular vote
Jirawat Sasomsub	64.12%
Somphon Phaphakchan	35.88%

2025 Nakhon Pathom Provincial Administrative Organization chief executive election
Party	Candidate	Votes	%	±%
Klum Chao Ban	Jirawat Sasomsub	193,256	64.12	
Independent	Somphon Phaphakchan	108,129	35.88	
Total votes		301,385	100.00	
Rejected ballots		29,832	7.84	
Blank ballots		49,063	12.90	
Turnout		380,280	51.62	
Registered electors		736,714		

=== Nakhon Phanom ===
Popular vote
Anuchit Hongsadi	52.61%
Supapanee Phosu	43.47%
Prasong Boonpong	1.52%
Prasopchok Wachaiyung	1.37%
Phichet Kulakul	0.37%
Chamnian Wongsanurak	0.37%
Suwit Mima	0.16%
Wassana Triyarach	0.14%

2025 Nakhon Phanom Provincial Administrative Organization chief executive election
Party	Candidate	Votes	%	±%
Pheu Thai	Anuchit Hongsadi	172,226	52.61	
Klum Nakhon Phanom Ruam Jai	Supapanee Phosu	142,317	43.47	
Independent	Prasong Boonpong	4,963	1.52	
Independent	Prasopchok Wachaiyung	4,488	1.37	
Independent	Phichet Kulakul	1,224	0.37	
Independent	Chamnian Wongsanurak	1,197	0.37	
Independent	Suwit Mima	513	0.16	
Independent	Wassana Triyarach	460	0.14	
Total votes		327,388	100.00	
Rejected ballots		15,488	4.40	
Blank ballots		8,872	2.52	
Turnout		351,748	62.14	
Registered electors		566,028		

=== Nakhon Ratchasima ===
The election was won by Yolda Wangsupakitkosol. Published vote totals for Nakhon Ratchasima differ substantially between sources and no official count has been located, so figures are not given here.

=== Nan ===
Popular vote
Nopparat Thawong	57.78%
Santipap Intarapat	17.92%
Pichit Moksri	9.75%
Athiwat Techabun	8.68%
Sanoe Vejsamphan	5.87%

2025 Nan Provincial Administrative Organization chief executive election
Party	Candidate	Votes	%	±%
Pheu Thai	Nopparat Thawong	124,151	57.78	
Independent	Santipap Intarapat	38,506	17.92	
Klum Nan Pattana	Pichit Moksri	20,957	9.75	
Independent	Athiwat Techabun	18,648	8.68	
Independent	Sanoe Vejsamphan	12,620	5.87	
Total votes		214,882	100.00	
Rejected ballots		12,900	5.15	
Blank ballots		22,872	9.12	
Turnout		250,654	65.02	
Registered electors		385,522		

=== Narathiwat ===
Popular vote
Ku Seng Yao Aha San	50.94%
Abdulrak Sani	48.39%
Aishah Daeh	0.67%

2025 Narathiwat Provincial Administrative Organization chief executive election
Party	Candidate	Votes	%	±%
Independent	Ku Seng Yao Aha San	187,139	50.94	
Klum Plian	Abdulrak Sani	177,771	48.39	
Independent	Aishah Daeh	2,474	0.67	
Total votes		367,384	100.00	
Rejected ballots		17,846	4.47	
Blank ballots		14,441	3.61	
Turnout		399,671	68.42	
Registered electors		584,140		

=== Nong Bua Lamphu ===
Popular vote
Saranya Suwanaprom	56.24%
Wuttipong Sirisathit	31.28%
Opal Hattasongskorn	9.36%
Kriangkrai Sowjaroensuk	1.48%
Manit Ontao	1.22%
Ariyaporn Khotnarin	0.42%

2025 Nong Bua Lamphu Provincial Administrative Organization chief executive election
Party	Candidate	Votes	%	±%
Klum Nong Bua Khunnatam	Saranya Suwanaprom	119,743	56.24	
Klum Rak Nong Bua	Wuttipong Sirisathit	66,603	31.28	
Klum Pheu Tai Nong Bua Lamphu	Opal Hattasongskorn	19,922	9.36	
Independent	Kriangkrai Sowjaroensuk	3,141	1.48	
Independent	Manit Ontao	2,597	1.22	
Independent	Ariyaporn Khotnarin	894	0.42	
Total votes		212,900	100.00	
Rejected ballots		8,598	3.78	
Blank ballots		6,125	2.69	
Turnout		227,623	56.54	
Registered electors		402,611		

=== Nong Khai ===
Popular vote
Wutthikrai Changlek	48.48%
Yuttana Sritabutr	45.48%
Narongchai Lawongsa	6.03%

2025 Nong Khai Provincial Administrative Organization chief executive election
Party	Candidate	Votes	%	±%
Pheu Thai	Wutthikrai Changlek	106,388	48.48	
Klum Rak Nong Khai	Yuttana Sritabutr	99,798	45.48	
Independent	Narongchai Lawongsa	13,239	6.03	
Total votes		219,425	100.00	
Rejected ballots		9,824	4.15	
Blank ballots		7,338	3.10	
Turnout		236,587	58.18	
Registered electors		406,647		

=== Nonthaburi ===
Popular vote
Thongchai Yenprasert	57.26%
Lertmongkol Waravenuch	40.50%
Pimporn Churod	2.24%

2025 Nonthaburi Provincial Administrative Organization chief executive election
Party	Candidate	Votes	%	±%
Klum Phueng Luang	Thongchai Yenprasert	219,173	57.26	
People's	Lertmongkol Waravenuch	155,035	40.50	
Independent	Pimporn Churod	8,574	2.24	
Total votes		382,782	100.00	
Rejected ballots		12,268	2.84	
Blank ballots		37,562	8.68	
Turnout		432,612	41.12	
Registered electors		1,051,994		

=== Pattani ===
Popular vote
Set Alyufree	71.97%
Abdul Basim Abu	17.75%
Sharifuddeen Sareaming	10.28%

2025 Pattani Provincial Administrative Organization chief executive election
Party	Candidate	Votes	%	±%
Independent	Set Alyufree	194,649	71.97	
Independent	Abdul Basim Abu	47,998	17.75	
Klum Pluk Palang Pattani	Sharifuddeen Sareaming	27,808	10.28	
Total votes		270,455	100.00	
Rejected ballots		20,752	6.51	
Blank ballots		27,373	8.59	
Turnout		318,580	62.03	
Registered electors		513,555		

=== Phang Nga ===
Popular vote
Bamrung Piyanamvanich	50.35%
Tharatip Thongchoem	31.24%
Sutthichok Thongchumnum	16.13%
Phisit Chongphongsa	2.27%

2025 Phang Nga Provincial Administrative Organization chief executive election
Party	Candidate	Votes	%	±%
Klum Rak Phang Nga Pattana Phang Nga	Bamrung Piyanamvanich	55,564	50.35	
Klum Ruam Sang Phang Nga	Tharatip Thongchoem	34,477	31.24	
People's	Sutthichok Thongchumnum	17,803	16.13	
Independent	Phisit Chongphongsa	2,506	2.27	
Total votes		110,350	100.00	
Rejected ballots		5,124	4.08	
Blank ballots		10,132	8.07	
Turnout		125,606	61.10	
Registered electors		205,582		

=== Phatthalung ===
The election was won by Wisut Thammaphet. Published vote totals for Phatthalung differ substantially between sources and no official count has been located, so figures are not given here.

=== Phichit ===
Popular vote
Krit Pensupa	65.37%
Kritsada Phattharaprasit	30.93%
Pracha Phosri	3.29%
Sukserm Paiboonsiri	0.41%

2025 Phichit Provincial Administrative Organization chief executive election
Party	Candidate	Votes	%	±%
Klum Ban Si Khiao	Krit Pensupa	147,836	65.37	
Klum Pattana Changwat Phichit	Kritsada Phattharaprasit	69,954	30.93	
Independent	Pracha Phosri	7,452	3.29	
Independent	Sukserm Paiboonsiri	919	0.41	
Total votes		226,161	100.00	
Registered electors		420,732		

=== Phrae ===
Popular vote
Anuwat Wongwan	62.47%
Prasong Chumchoey	37.53%

2025 Phrae Provincial Administrative Organization chief executive election
Party	Candidate	Votes	%	±%
Pheu Thai	Anuwat Wongwan	124,750	62.47	
Klum Phrae Pattana	Prasong Chumchoey	74,934	37.53	
Total votes		199,684	100.00	
Rejected ballots		13,227	5.81	
Blank ballots		14,766	6.49	
Turnout		227,677	63.55	
Registered electors		358,280		

=== Phuket ===
Popular vote
Rewat Areerob	64.91%
Lersak Leenanithikul	33.42%
Srithep Udomlap	1.67%

2025 Phuket Provincial Administrative Organization chief executive election
Party	Candidate	Votes	%	±%
Klum Phuket Yat Dai	Rewat Areerob	86,616	64.91	
People's	Lersak Leenanithikul	44,602	33.42	
Independent	Srithep Udomlap	2,228	1.67	
Total votes		133,446	100.00	
Turnout		144,978	46.10	
Registered electors		314,507		

=== Prachinburi ===
Popular vote
Napaphat Anchasanichmon	55.72%
Chamroon Suaydee	26.06%
Ampai Kongmanee	14.96%
Kritkamon Phaengsri	3.27%

2025 Prachinburi Provincial Administrative Organization chief executive election
Party	Candidate	Votes	%	±%
Pheu Thai	Napaphat Anchasanichmon	128,156	55.72	
People's	Chamroon Suaydee	59,929	26.06	
Independent	Ampai Kongmanee	34,398	14.96	
Independent	Kritkamon Phaengsri	7,522	3.27	
Total votes		230,005	100.00	
Rejected ballots		13,487	5.18	
Blank ballots		16,842	6.47	
Turnout		260,334	66.39	
Registered electors		392,151		

=== Prachuap Khiri Khan ===
Popular vote
Sarawut Lim Arunrak	58.80%
Nithi Plangsriskul	41.20%

2025 Prachuap Khiri Khan Provincial Administrative Organization chief executive election
Party	Candidate	Votes	%	±%
Klum Prachuap Model	Sarawut Lim Arunrak	118,303	58.80	
Klum Prachuap Nueng Diao	Nithi Plangsriskul	82,881	41.20	
Total votes		201,184	100.00	
Rejected ballots		17,991	7.82	
Blank ballots		10,813	4.70	
Turnout		229,988	53.75	
Registered electors		427,867		

=== Rayong ===
The election was won by Piya Pitutecha. Published vote totals for Rayong differ substantially between sources and no official count has been located, so figures are not given here.

=== Sakon Nakhon ===
Popular vote
Naruemon Sapsor	51.01%
Chupong Khamjuang	21.29%
Anurak Boonsol	18.39%
Khajornsak Benchai	6.66%
Taiwan Khamsang	2.65%

2025 Sakon Nakhon Provincial Administrative Organization chief executive election
Party	Candidate	Votes	%	±%
Pheu Thai	Naruemon Sapsor	238,887	51.01	
Klum Palang Sakon Nakhon	Chupong Khamjuang	99,712	21.29	
Klum Sakon Nakhon Samart Dee Kwa Doem	Anurak Boonsol	86,148	18.39	
Klum Mot Som Sakon Nakhon	Khajornsak Benchai	31,184	6.66	
Independent	Taiwan Khamsang	12,403	2.65	
Total votes		468,334	100.00	
Registered electors		905,519		

=== Samut Prakan ===
Popular vote
Soonthorn Pansaengthong	44.65%
Noppadol Somyanontanakul	40.09%
Prasert Chaikitdennapalai	11.70%
Seksan Pingen	3.56%

2025 Samut Prakan Provincial Administrative Organization chief executive election
Party	Candidate	Votes	%	±%
Klum Samut Prakan Kao Na	Soonthorn Pansaengthong	225,686	44.65	
People's	Noppadol Somyanontanakul	202,659	40.09	
Independent	Prasert Chaikitdennapalai	59,117	11.70	
Independent	Seksan Pingen	18,000	3.56	
Total votes		505,462	100.00	
Rejected ballots		22,055	3.87	
Blank ballots		42,142	7.40	
Turnout		569,659	51.91	
Registered electors		1,097,309		

=== Samut Sakhon ===
Popular vote
Udom Kraiwatnusorn	66.16%
Chaowarin Chansaychon	33.84%

2025 Samut Sakhon Provincial Administrative Organization chief executive election
Party	Candidate	Votes	%	±%
Klum Khon Tham Ngan	Udom Kraiwatnusorn	125,277	66.16	
People's	Chaowarin Chansaychon	64,076	33.84	
Total votes		189,353	100.00	
Rejected ballots		10,145	4.81	
Blank ballots		11,573	5.48	
Turnout		211,071	47.18	
Registered electors		447,413		

=== Samut Songkhram ===
Popular vote
Jetsada Yanpraphasiri	34.66%
Nanthiya Likhitamnuaychai	27.12%
Kanchanasuda Panasuttha	16.06%
Thanathat Khunnuch	14.00%
Sukanya Saosan	6.18%
Teerapong Srikamnerd	1.99%

2025 Samut Songkhram Provincial Administrative Organization chief executive election
Party	Candidate	Votes	%	±%
Klum Khon Khong Prachachon Khon Samut Songkhram	Jetsada Yanpraphasiri	30,407	34.66	
People's	Nanthiya Likhitamnuaychai	23,791	27.12	
Klum Ruam Rath Pattana	Kanchanasuda Panasuttha	14,086	16.06	
Independent	Thanathat Khunnuch	12,283	14.00	
Independent	Sukanya Saosan	5,421	6.18	
Independent	Teerapong Srikamnerd	1,745	1.99	
Total votes		87,733	100.00	
Rejected ballots		3,411	3.57	
Blank ballots		4,351	4.56	
Turnout		95,495	61.85	
Registered electors		154,403		

=== Saraburi ===
Popular vote
Sanya Boon-Lhong	51.13%
Prasit Anaman	24.86%
Suttichai Wongphrai	17.34%
Phutthong Phothipanya	2.96%
Watchara Puriwanchana	1.89%
Thanakrit Atthasampunna	1.82%

2025 Saraburi Provincial Administrative Organization chief executive election
Party	Candidate	Votes	%	±%
Independent	Sanya Boon-Lhong	133,553	51.13	
Klum Kao Mai Saraburi	Prasit Anaman	64,945	24.86	
Independent	Suttichai Wongphrai	45,281	17.34	
Klum Kao Mai	Phutthong Phothipanya	7,729	2.96	
Independent	Watchara Puriwanchana	4,941	1.89	
Independent	Thanakrit Atthasampunna	4,743	1.82	
Total votes		261,192	100.00	
Rejected ballots		16,664	5.26	
Blank ballots		39,017	12.31	
Turnout		316,873	63.33	
Registered electors		500,375		

=== Satun ===
Popular vote
Sumrit Liangprasit	43.15%
Umar Akem	39.89%
Sultan Ismailsa	12.70%
Thanakom Pochanaphitak	4.26%

2025 Satun Provincial Administrative Organization chief executive election
Party	Candidate	Votes	%	±%
Klum Satun Santitham	Sumrit Liangprasit	56,955	43.15	
Klum Ruam Palang Satun	Umar Akem	52,650	39.89	
Klum Plian Satun	Sultan Ismailsa	16,765	12.70	
Klum Satun Kao Mai	Thanakom Pochanaphitak	5,617	4.26	
Total votes		131,987	100.00	
Blank ballots		14,659	9.56	
Registered electors		241,562		

=== Sing Buri ===
Popular vote
Supawat Tianthaworn	100.00%

2025 Sing Buri Provincial Administrative Organization chief executive election
Party	Candidate	Votes	%	±%
Independent	Supawat Tianthaworn	76,031	100.00	
Total votes		76,031	100.00	
Registered electors		165,459		

=== Sisaket ===
Popular vote
Wichit Traisornkul	57.61%
Wiwatchai Hotrawaisaya	36.23%
Ratdawan Promtha	1.96%
Nawin Worasakmahasan	1.34%
Naruchit Charuratkul	0.93%
Chorladda Udduang	0.86%
Amnuay Tonsri	0.74%
Boonthavorn Panyasit	0.33%

2025 Sisaket Provincial Administrative Organization chief executive election
Party	Candidate	Votes	%	±%
Klum Khon Thong Thin	Wichit Traisornkul	368,806	57.61	
Pheu Thai	Wiwatchai Hotrawaisaya	231,962	36.23	
Independent	Ratdawan Promtha	12,578	1.96	
Independent	Nawin Worasakmahasan	8,551	1.34	
Independent	Naruchit Charuratkul	5,968	0.93	
Independent	Chorladda Udduang	5,493	0.86	
Independent	Amnuay Tonsri	4,723	0.74	
Klum Sisaket Kao Na	Boonthavorn Panyasit	2,116	0.33	
Total votes		640,197	100.00	
Rejected ballots		25,021	3.66	
Blank ballots		18,115	2.65	
Turnout		683,333	59.19	
Registered electors		1,154,565		

=== Songkhla ===
Popular vote
Supit Phitaktham	50.66%
Prasong Borirak	23.35%
Niran Jindanak	16.54%
Apinya Yodkaew	4.63%
Nattaphat Chumthongchoetbamrung	1.67%
Songkhla Phokanthee	1.14%
Duangphon Senawan	0.97%
Chananchida Promrach	0.63%
Saksith Ratanapiboon	0.41%

2025 Songkhla Provincial Administrative Organization chief executive election
Party	Candidate	Votes	%	±%
Klum Songkhla Palang Mai	Supit Phitaktham	290,040	50.66	
Klum Songkhla Khemkhaeng	Prasong Borirak	133,656	23.35	
People's	Niran Jindanak	94,700	16.54	
Klum Plian Songkhla	Apinya Yodkaew	26,523	4.63	
Klum Rao Rak Songkhla	Nattaphat Chumthongchoetbamrung	9,576	1.67	
Klum Songkhla Pho Kan Thee	Songkhla Phokanthee	6,548	1.14	
Independent	Duangphon Senawan	5,542	0.97	
Independent	Chananchida Promrach	3,588	0.63	
Independent	Saksith Ratanapiboon	2,323	0.41	
Total votes		572,496	100.00	
Rejected ballots		28,593	4.16	
Blank ballots		86,855	12.63	
Turnout		687,944	62.51	
Registered electors		1,100,487		

=== Suphan Buri ===
Popular vote
Udom Prongfa	57.75%
Boonchu Chansuwan	25.06%
Pinyo Sunthornvipat	14.89%
Prachob Leenukul	2.30%

2025 Suphan Buri Provincial Administrative Organization chief executive election
Party	Candidate	Votes	%	±%
Chart Thai Pattana	Udom Prongfa	204,108	57.75	
Independent	Boonchu Chansuwan	88,575	25.06	
Klum Kao Klai Suphan Buri	Pinyo Sunthornvipat	52,643	14.89	
Independent	Prachob Leenukul	8,134	2.30	
Total votes		353,460	100.00	
Rejected ballots		16,274	4.13	
Blank ballots		24,113	6.12	
Turnout		393,847	58.95	
Registered electors		668,052		

=== Surat Thani ===
Popular vote
Sopha Kanjana	40.00%
Pongsak Jakaew	31.05%
Jirachat Ruangwatcharin	23.00%
Somphon Singhaphon	4.74%
Wichian Chanbua	0.94%
Krit Boonprasop	0.27%

2025 Surat Thani Provincial Administrative Organization chief executive election
Party	Candidate	Votes	%	±%
Klum Palang Surat Thani	Sopha Kanjana	205,479	40.00	
Klum Khon Rak Surat	Pongsak Jakaew	159,488	31.05	
People's	Jirachat Ruangwatcharin	118,143	23.00	
Independent	Somphon Singhaphon	24,347	4.74	
Klum Surat Kao Mai	Wichian Chanbua	4,837	0.94	
Independent	Krit Boonprasop	1,392	0.27	
Total votes		513,686	100.00	
Rejected ballots		16,019	2.90	
Registered electors		829,199		

=== Trang ===
Popular vote
Bunleng Lo Sathanapornpipit	77.75%
Yanyong Tantiteerayan	13.80%
Taweesak Songchu	8.45%

2025 Trang Provincial Administrative Organization chief executive election
Party	Candidate	Votes	%	±%
Klum Nayok Bunleng	Bunleng Lo Sathanapornpipit	171,694	77.75	
Klum Puangchon Satta	Yanyong Tantiteerayan	30,467	13.80	
Klum Nayok Sri-loek	Taweesak Songchu	18,670	8.45	
Total votes		220,831	100.00	
Registered electors		502,163		

=== Trat ===
Popular vote
Wichian Supacharoen	42.14%
Chonlathee Numnoo	36.19%
Charoen Chalalai	20.55%
Banchong Kanchananan	0.82%
Paiwan Chalalai	0.29%

2025 Trat Provincial Administrative Organization chief executive election
Party	Candidate	Votes	%	±%
Klum Luk Mueang Trat	Wichian Supacharoen	41,445	42.14	
People's	Chonlathee Numnoo	35,588	36.19	
Klum Trat Tong Charoen	Charoen Chalalai	20,212	20.55	
Independent	Banchong Kanchananan	807	0.82	
Klum Trat Tong Charoen	Paiwan Chalalai	288	0.29	
Total votes		98,340	100.00	
Rejected ballots		3,618	3.45	
Blank ballots		3,003	2.86	
Turnout		104,961	60.47	
Registered electors		173,569		

=== Yala ===
Popular vote
Mukhtar Mata	81.50%
Abdullateh Yagad	18.50%

2025 Yala Provincial Administrative Organization chief executive election
Party	Candidate	Votes	%	±%
Klum Yala Pattana	Mukhtar Mata	144,130	81.50	
Independent	Abdullateh Yagad	32,710	18.50	
Total votes		176,840	100.00	
Rejected ballots		18,533	8.25	
Blank ballots		29,334	13.05	
Turnout		224,707	58.60	
Registered electors		383,481		

== Analysis ==
Writing for the ISEAS–Yusof Ishak Institute, Chanintorn Pensute of Chiang Mai University characterised the election as one in which national parties intervened heavily while leaving little space for candidates without an established base.

=== Party endorsement ===
Nine parties were involved in the contests, but only three endorsed candidates formally. Pheu Thai endorsed 16 and elected 10, in Nakhon Ratchasima, Sakon Nakhon, Nong Khai, Maha Sarakham, Nakhon Phanom, Prachinburi, Chiang Mai, Nan, Phrae and Lampang. The People's Party endorsed 17 and elected one, in Lamphun. Chart Thai Pattana endorsed a single candidate, in its Suphan Buri stronghold. Bhumjaithai endorsed nobody but was closely connected to several winners, an arrangement Pensute argues was deliberate: in provinces such as Chiang Rai and Sisaket, where the party holds few or no parliamentary seats, a formal endorsement risked doing a candidate more harm than good, so an informal association and a congratulatory message afterwards were the safer course. No candidate was endorsed by the Democrat Party, whose affiliates stood as independents.

=== Incumbency and political families ===
Incumbency proved a powerful advantage. Across the country somewhat more than half of the sitting chief executives were returned, and in the northern provinces the proportion was higher still, with incumbents re-elected in Chiang Rai, Chiang Mai, Nan, Phrae, Mae Hong Son and Lampang. Of the 76 provinces, 12 had a chief executive who had held the post for more than twenty years. Somsak Kittithornkul was returned unopposed in Krabi for an eighth term, while Wichit Traisornkul in Sisaket and Thanapon Kitchakan in Chanthaburi each won a seventh.

Political families, known in Thai as trakun kan mueang or ban yai, featured prominently. Members of the Wanchaitanawong family retained the chief executive's post in both Chiang Rai and Mae Hong Son, and the Wongwan family held Phrae through Anuwat Wongwan, who by the end of his term will have led that organisation for more than two decades. In Lamphun, however, another member of the same family, Anusorn Wongwan, was defeated by Weeradej Phupisit of the People's Party, himself the son of a former chief executive of the province.

=== The People's Party ===
For the People's Party the outcome was mixed. A single provincial victory was a poor return on 17 endorsements, but it was an improvement on 2020, when the party's predecessor movement contested 42 provinces and won none. Pensute points to Chiang Mai as the more instructive case: Pun-Arj Chairatana, a first-time candidate with no political background, took 41.78 per cent of the ballots cast against an incumbent backed by Thaksin Shinawatra, and the party simultaneously won 15 of the 42 council seats in the province, including four of five in the city district. The comparison drawn is that opposition candidates in several provinces increased their vote substantially while Pheu Thai's held roughly steady, most starkly in Lampang, where the losing candidate's vote rose by 137 per cent between 2020 and 2025 as the incumbent's declined.

=== Wider significance ===
Provincial administrative organisations control a meaningful share of public spending, with local government accounting for 22.36 per cent of the national expenditure budget in the 2025 fiscal year, and the campaigns were explicitly tied to national politics. Pheu Thai speakers in Chiang Mai linked continued support for the party to delivery of the 10,000-baht handout, while People's Party figures campaigned on decentralisation and on the transparency of provincial administration. Pensute notes that the two-term limit reinstated by the fifth amendment to the Provincial Administrative Organisation Act will apply from the next round in 2029, disqualifying those who have served consecutively in 2020 and 2025 and potentially opening the field to newcomers.

== Conduct ==
=== Spoiled and blank ballots ===
The number of invalid ballots attracted comment. In the chief executive contests 931,290 ballots were spoiled and a further 1,158,201 were cast for none of the candidates, together 12.77 per cent of all ballots. Sawaeng Boonmee said the spoiled ballot rate was little changed from the 2020 election and attributed much of it to the ballot design, since the number of candidates for chief executive and for council differed between constituencies and voters could mark a box for a candidate who did not exist in their contest. The highest totals were in Nakhon Ratchasima, with 71,306 spoiled ballots and 110,934 marked for no candidate, and in Samut Prakan, with 51,788 spoiled ballots.

=== Re-runs and repeat voting ===
Four council constituencies required a fresh election. In Chai Nat, constituency 1 of Wat Sing district had no valid candidate at all after the sole entrant was disqualified under section 50(20) of the Local Election Act of 2019, which bars a person whose electoral rights are suspended for having failed to vote at a previous election. In the other three, constituency 1 of Mueang Suphan Buri district, constituency 2 of Mueang Trang district and constituency 4 of Sawi district in Chumphon, the leading candidate received fewer votes than the number of ballots marked for no candidate. Provincial election directors were required to call the re-runs within seven days and to hold them within 45 days.

Separately, on 11 February the EC ordered voting to be repeated at 22 polling stations across 11 provinces on 23 February, after checks found that ballot counts did not reconcile with the number of voters recorded.

=== Complaints and recount requests ===
By 3 February the EC had received 180 complaints concerning both the administration of the election and alleged electoral fraud. The People's Party sought recounts in Chiang Mai and Samut Prakan on the grounds of the high number of spoiled ballots. An official of a polling station committee died in a road accident while transporting ballot boxes, which the EC cited in defending its decision to hold the election on a Saturday rather than a Sunday.

== Aftermath ==
The People's Party won 132 council seats nationwide.

Complaints were lodged against several successful chief executive candidates. The EC dismissed a petition alleging that Napaphat Anchasanichmon of Prachinburi had held shares in a media company, but in December 2025 the governor of Prachinburi ordered her removal from office over shareholdings dating from her earlier service as a council member. In May 2026 the EC dismissed a vote-buying complaint against Supit Phitaktham of Songkhla.
