= Thailand 2026 =

Thailand 2026 may refer to:

- 2026 in Thailand, a list of events and scheduled events in the year in Thailand
- 2025 ASEAN Para Games, the multi-sport event for the disabled in Nakhon Ratchasima province, which will be held in 2026.
