= Russians in Thailand =

Total population
- 30,000 in Phuket (May 2026 estimate)

Regions with significant populations
- Phuket

Languages
- Russian

Russians in Thailand are Russians or individuals born in the Russian Empire, Soviet Union or Russian Federation, who are citizens or residents of Thailand.

== Demographics ==
Following the 2022 Russian invasion of Ukraine, thousands of Russian nationals moved to Thailand. A large number have settled in Phuket.

As of November 2024, approximately 60,000 Russians were estimated to be living in Thailand illegally.

In August 2026, Russian siblings Diana and Roman Nazimova were killed in Chonburi province.
