= Chalong Riewrang =

Thai politician

Chalong Riewrang (Thai: ฉลอง เรี่ยวแรง) is a Thai former politician. Chalong previously served as a Member of Parliament for Nonthaburi province. On 10 August 2026, police said Chalong shot and killed Thongchai Yenprasert, chairman of the Nonthaburi Provincial Administrative Organization (PAO) over a monetary dispute.
