= 2027 in Thailand =

- Decades: 2000s; 2010s; 2020s; 2030s
- See also: Other events of 2027; Timeline of Thai history

Following is a list of events and scheduled events in the year 2027 in Thailand. The year 2027 is reckoned as the year 2570 in Buddhist Era, the Thai calendar.

== Events ==
=== Predicted and scheduled ===
- October – Miss Grand International 2027

== Holidays ==
- 1 January – New Year's Day
- 6 February – Chinese New Year
- 21 February – Makha Bucha Day
- 8–9–March – Hari Raya Puasa
- 6 April – Chakri Memorial Day
- 13–15 April – Songkran Festival
- 1 May – Labour Day
- 4 May – Coronation of King Vajiralongkorn Holiday
- 20 May
  - Royal Ploughing Ceremony
  - Visakha Bucha Day
- 3 June – Queen Suthida's Birthday
- 18 July – Asahna Bucha Day
- 28 July – King Vajiralongkorn's Birthday
- 12 August – The Queen Mother's Birthday
- 13 October – King Bhumibol Adulyadej Memorial Day
- 23 October – Chulalongkorn Memorial Day
- 5 December – King Bhumibol Adulyadej's Birthday
- 10 December – Constitution Day
- 25 December – Christmas Day
- 31 December – New Year's Eve
