= Thongyai Asavanund =

Thongyai Asavanund (Thai: ทองใหญ่ อัศวานันท์), nicknamed Att (Thai: อัฏฐ์), is a Thai business executive in the digital-asset industry. He served as chief executive officer of XSpring Digital and later served as chief executive officer of ERX, the operator of KuCoin Thailand. He was also chairman of the Thai Digital Asset Operators Trade Association (TDO).

== Education ==
Thangyai holds a Master of Business Administration degree from the Sasin Graduate Institute of Business Administration of Chulalongkorn University.

== Career ==
Thangyai served as chief executive officer of XSpring Digital, an ICO portal approved by Thailand's Securities and Exchange Commission. In 2021, he was involved in the launch of SiriHub, an investment token linked to revenue from the Siri Campus office project. XSpring Digital offered the token through its ICO portal in September that year. The offering sought to raise THB 2.4 billion and was based on revenue from the Siri Campus office project in Bangkok.

In 2024, Thangyai was one of two candidates considered for the position of president of the Stock Exchange of Thailand. Thairath describes him as a key figure in the development of Thailand's digital-asset industry.

In 2025, Thangyai was chief executive officer of ERX, which operated the digital-asset exchange KuCoin Thailand. ERX launched the KuCoin Thailand brand in April 2025.

In April 2026, the Thai Securities and Exchange Commission fined Thongyai 108,000 baht for failing to ensure that ERX complied with foreign-exchange transaction rules. The violations occurred on three dates in 2025, when ERX conducted foreign-currency transactions above its allocated limit without checking the limit beforehand. ERX was separately fined 108,000 baht.

== Personal life ==
Thongyai has a son, Ing Asavanund (อิงค์ อัศวานันท์), who is a motorcycle racer and actor under GMMTV.
