= 2025 SEA Games esports cheating scandal =

2025 esports cheating scandal

Arena of Valor SEA Games cheating scandal
- Date: December 15, 2025
- Venue: Sala Phra Kieo, Chulalongkorn University
- Location: Bangkok, Thailand
- Type: Cheating scandal in esports
- Perpetrators: Naphat "Tokyogurl" Warasin; Kong "Cheerio" Sutprom
- Arrests: 4 February 2026 (both later released on bail after conviction pending appeal)
- Accused: 6 February 2026
- Convicted: 17 March 2026
- Sentence: 3 months

At the Arena of Valor (AoV) women's tournament of the 2025 SEA Games, Thai esports athlete Naphat "Tokyogurl" Warasin was found to have cheated causing the whole Thailand AoV team to withdraw. During Thailand's match against Vietnam on 15 December 2025, Naphat was caught trying to download a third party application which would enable her accomplice Kong Sutprom to play in her behalf. The pair were convicted of crimes on 17 March 2026.

== Background ==
=== Tournament ===
Esports has been contested as a medal event alongside traditional sports at the SEA Games since the 2019 edition in the Philippines.

Among the video game titles contested at the 2025 SEA Games in Thailand is Arena of Valor (AoV) which is commonly known in the host country as Realm of Valor (RoV). The game involves 5 versus 5 team battles, with players selecting "heroes" or characters interacting in varied maps. The cheating scandal occurred during the women's AoV tournament. The tournament was held at the Sala Phra Kieo at the Chulalongkorn University, Bangkok.

In the group stage, Thailand won its first two fixtures against Timor Leste and Laos before losing to Vietnam.

=== Thailand roster ===
Thailand national esports team – 33rd Southeast Asian Games women's AoV team roster
Players
Coaches

Name	Team
Paricha Boonmung	—
Patitta Banjongkliang	—
Jormkon Pumseenil	—
Withani Withoon Anuwatr	—
Sulila Aiamsuwan	—
Naphat Warasin	(Thailand) Talon

Head coach

(Thailand) Jakrapon Pompranee

Legend

- Team – describes last
  team before the tournament

Roster

=== Perpetrators ===
Tokyogurl and Cheerio

Personal information
- Name: Naphat Warasin (Tokyogurl); Kong Sutprom (Cheerio)
- Nationality: Thai

Career information
- Games: Mobile Legends: Bang Bang
- Playing career: Until 2025 (Tokyogurl)

Team history
- Until 2025: Talon TH (Tokyogurl)

The cheating incident involved Thailand AoV women's teamplayer, Naphat Warasin, known by her handle "Tokyogurl". She had played the role of marksman for the team. Prior to the 2025 SEA Games, Naphat was also a member of the professional esports team, Talon TH and a video game streamer. Her accomplice was later identified as Kong Sutprom, also known as "Cheerio". Naphat was 29 years old and Kong was 23 at the time of the incident.

== Incident ==
The cheating scheme was detected during the match between Thailand and Vietnam on 15 December 2025. The match was paused for an investigation, with the referees warning the team about unauthorized use of Discord on a competition device.

Naphat Warasin was expelled from the tournament for unauthorized third-party software or hardware modification (a violation of Item 9.4.3 of the Esports Technical Handbook), and for bringing Esports into disrepute after she raised her middle finger during a television broadcast of the match. Thailand lost the match against Vietnam by 3-0.

Her teammates later disclosed that they had become suspicious of Naphat's behavior two days prior, with Naphat reportedly getting angry upon being confronted. The team proceeded with the match as they could not act upon the suspicion due to a lack of evidence at that time. After the Vietnam match, Jomkhon "Givemeakiss" Phumsinin reported the incident and disclosed that Naphat asked to borrow a teammate's competition device, claiming her own phone lacked an internet connection, whereas any device-sharing requires prior approval and the signature of a coach.

Further details about how Naphat and her accomplice Kong cheated were later revealed during a February 2026 investigation: Naphat disclosed how she shared the login credentials of the competition account to Kong on 14 December, with the Naphat playing as herself during Thailand's match against Timor Leste, and Kong playing on behalf of Naphat for the match against Vietnam.

On the day of the matches, Naphat clandestinely brought a second device with Discord installed to swap with the competition device so Kong could play on her behalf. The organizers detected two devices logged into Naphat's competition account during the Vietnam match, prompting the organizers to disconnect the pair and change the account's password.

15 December	Vietnam	2	–	0	Thailand	Bangkok
	Report					Sala Phra Kieo, Chulalongkorn University

== Aftermath ==
=== Tournament conclusion ===
The Thailand E-Sports Federation (TESF) accepted Naphat's expulsion and withdrew the entire Thai AoV women's team from the competition on 16 December 2025. Thailand and Laos were playing in a lower-bracket final match prior to the withdrawal, with Thailand leading 1-0: Laos were awarded a walkover to the final, where Vietnam defeated them for the AoV women's gold medal by 4–0.

=== Reactions ===
Naphat initially denied allegations of cheating attributing her behavior during the match to being nervous and panicky. She also explained that her finger gesture was playful interaction with another teammate. She maintained if she cheated she would have won the game.

AoV publisher Garena imposed a lifetime ban on Naphat following the incident, and Naphat was also removed from her esports team, Talon TH, on 16 December 2025. Naphat disabled her social media accounts following the controversy.

TESF president Santi Lothong, in a YouTube livestream in the Thai program Hone-Krasae, lamented the incident stating "cheating and still losing is shameful".

Kong Sutprom, "Cheerio", admitted to his involvement in the cheating scandal on 2 January 2026, saying he attempted to play in the SEA Games behalf of Naphat. He apologized for bringing shame to Thailand.

=== Court case and conviction ===
The Central Investigation Bureau (CIB), through its Crime Suppression Division, arrested Naphat and Kong on 4 February 2026 in Nonthaburi and Nakhon Phanom provinces, also seizing evidence related to their cheating. On 6 February 2026 charges were filed against Naphat and Kong at the Pathumwan Kwaeng Court for "colluding to obtain and disclose restricted computer access credentials and with unlawfully accessing computer data protected by security measures". The pair both formally pleaded guilty.

The pair disclosed their methods during the investigation: Kong also admitted that he had been playing for Naphat for "a long time" and was hired to boost her image on social media.

On 17 March 2026, the pair was sentenced to a six-month confinement, but this was reduced to three months each due to their co-operation with the investigation and pleas of guilty. They were granted bail and were ordered to pay a fine of 24,000 baht ($740).
