= 2020 Thai Provincial Administrative Organization election =

- 20 December 2020

All 76 PAO presidents and PAO councils

Local elections were held in Thailand on 20 December 2020 to elect members and leaders of Provincial Administrative Organizations (PAO) in 76 provinces. The elections were the first provincial elections held since the 2014 military coup.

== Results ==
The Progressive Movement, led by Future Forward Party founder Thanathorn Juangroongruangkit, competed for PAO presidents in 42 provinces and ran over 1,000 candidates for PAO councils in 52 provinces. The movement won 55 seats in 18 provinces, and lost all PAO president elections.
