= Rang Thurapon =

Thai politician (1957–2026)

- หรั่ง ธุระพล

Member of the House of Representatives of Thailand for Udon Thani province
- In office 14 May 2023 – 20 July 2026

Personal details
- Born: 1 April 1957 Phen district, Thailand
- Died: 20 July 2026 (aged 69) Mueang Udon Thani district, Thailand
- Party: BJT (2008–2022, 2025–2026); Thai Sang Thai (2022–2025)
- Occupation: Businessman

Rang Thurapon (Thai: หรั่ง ธุระพล; 1 April 1957 – 20 July 2026) was a Thai politician. A member of the Bhumjaithai Party and the Thai Sang Thai Party, he served in the House of Representatives from 2023 to 2026.

Thurapon died in Mueang Udon Thani district on 20 July 2026, at the age of 69.
