= Weeradej Phupisit =

Thai politician

- วีระเดช ภู่พิสิฐ

Chief Executive of Lamphun Provincial Administrative Organization
- Incumbent
- Assumed office 1 February 2025
- Preceded by: Anusorn Wongwan

Personal details
- Born: 30 December 1987 (age 38) Lamphun, Thailand
- Party: People's

Weeradej Phupisit (Thai: วีระเดช ภู่พิสิฐ, RTGS: Wiradet Phuphisit) is a Thai politician, currently the chief executive of Lamphun Provincial Administrative Organization (PAO) since 2025. Weeradej is the first member of the People's Party (or its progressive predecessors, the Future Forward Party and Move Forward Party) to win a PAO election in Thailand.

== 2025 PAO election ==
Weeradej won the 2025 Provincial Administrative Organization chief executive election in Lamphun, narrowly beating the incumbent Pheu Thai PAO chief executive and cabinet minister Anusorn Wongwan. Former prime minister Thaksin Shinawatra had campaigned for Anusorn in Lamphun the week of the election.
