= Praneetsilpa Vacharapol =

Thai businesswoman (1932–2026)

Praneetsilpa Vacharapol MPCh ThC MVM PBh
- ประณีตศิลป์ วัชรพล
- Praneetsilpa in 2010
- Born: Praneetsilpa Suwannasorn; 24 October 1932; Bangkok, Siam
- Died: 13 November 2026 (aged 94); Bangkok, Thailand
- Occupation: Businesswoman
- Known for: Chairwoman of Thairath
- Spouse: Kamphol Vacharapol
- Children: Yingluck Vacharapol; Saravuth Vacharapol; Indira Vacharapol

Khunying Praneetsilpa Vacharapol (Thai: ประณีตศิลป์ วัชรพล; née Tummanon (ทุมมานนท์); 24 October 1932 – 13 November 2026) was a Thai businesswoman and philanthropist. She served as the chairwoman of Thairath, and also the chairwoman of the Thairath Foundation. She was also the wife of Kamphol Vacharapol.

== Early life and career ==
Praneetsilpa Tummanon was born in Bangkok, Siam, on 24 October 1932. She was one of the nine children of Jamnian Tummanon, and his wife, Lamai Tummanon.

In 1950, Praneetsilpa worked alongside her husband Kamphol Vacharapol. Together with Kamphol, she founded newspapers such as Khaopap and Siang Ang Thong and eventually founded Thairath on 25 December 1962.

In 1996, Khamphol died from kidney cancer. Praneetsilpa then became the chairwoman of Vacharapol Corporation and director of Thairath, She also developed her descendant's work on Thairath TV and online media.

== Personal life and death ==
In 1950, Praneetsilpa was married to Kamphol Vacharapol. They had three children together. Yingluck, Saravuth, and Indira Vacharapol.

On 12 November 2026, Praneetsilpa returned to her home in Suan Chitlada subdistrict, Dusit district, Bangkok, after being discharged from Vichaiyut Hospital. However, she died on the following day, on 13 November, at the age of 94. Her funeral was scheduled for 15 November, at Thairath's headquarters at Chomphon subdistrict.

== Royal decorations ==
- 1997 – Knight Grand Cross (First Class) of The Most Admirable Order of the Direkgunabhorn
- 2003 – Knight Grand Cordon (Special Class) of The Most Noble Order of the Crown of Thailand
- 2006 – Knight Commander (Second Class) of The Most Illustrious Order of Chula Chom Klao
- 2013 – Knight Grand Cordon (Special Class) of The Most Exalted Order of the White Elephant
