= Peacemaker (Thai band) =

Thai pop rock band

Peacemaker พีซเมกเกอร์
- Boy Peacemaker in 2024 Peet Peacemaker in 2016

Background information
- Origin: Bangkok, Thailand
- Genres: Pop; Pop Rock
- Years active: 2003–2005, 2026
- Past members: Anuwat Sanguansakphakdee; Phira Thetwisan

Peacemaker (Thai: พีซเมกเกอร์) was a Thai pop and pop rock duo formed in 2003 under the Thai label. The band consisted of lead vocalist Anuwat Sanguansakphakdee and guitarist Phira Thetwisan.

== History ==
Peacemaker was formed in 2003. Before the name Peacemaker, the band was called Greentea. Both of the members wanted a stronger-sounding name. So, they chose "Peacemaker", explaining that freedom in the world should be created through music rather than war.

The band consisted of Phira Thetwisan, a Thai guitarist with German descent who began playing guitar at age 18, and Anuwat Sanguansakphakdee, who started his music career by singing in restaurants until he caught the attention of Bakery Music, leading to his vocal appearance on "Hua Chai Phuk Kan" (หัวใจผูกกัน) for songwriter Boyd Kosiyabong.

Then, a producer from GMM Grammy saw the band and signed them to be in the label called ML with other musicians such as Thongchai McIntyre, Patiparn Patavekarn, and Tata Young. The band released their own studio album, which produced hit singles including "Ngao" (เหงา), "Mai Khoei Tham" (ไม่เคยถาม), and "Chon Kwa Fa Cha Mi Wela" (จนกว่าฟ้าจะมีเวลา). The band then got popular by making the song, which got 62nd place at the GMM Grammy charts in 2014.

Lead guitarist Phira Thetwisan (born 24 May 1979) died by suicide on 17 November 2026, at the age of 47.

== Members ==
- Anuwat Sanguansakphakdee – lead vocals
- Phira Thetwisan – lead guitar (died 2026)

== Discography ==
=== Peacemaker (2003) ===
1. Ngao (เหงา)
2. Mai Khoei Tham (ไม่เคยถาม)
3. Mai Mi Ik Laeo (ไม่มีอีกแล้ว)
4. Fak Chan (ฝากจันทร์)
5. Ya Khit Loei (อย่าคิดเลย)
6. Chon Kwa Fa Cha Mi Wela (จนกว่าฟ้าจะมีเวลา)
7. Lom Phat (ลมพัด)
8. Thi Trong Nan (ที่ตรงนั้น)
9. Cha Rong Phleng (จะร้องเพลง)
10. Khit Thueng (คิดถึง)

=== Panorama (2005) ===
1. Suan Koen (ส่วนเกิน)
2. Chan Mi Kha Khae Nai (ฉันมีค่าแค่ไหน)
3. Khrai Wa Thoe Mai Suai (ใครว่าเธอไม่สวย)
4. Kham Wa Rao (คำว่าเรา)
5. Siang (เสี่ยง)
6. Phit Thi Chan (ผิดที่ฉัน)
7. Love Story
8. Pai Duai Kan (ไปด้วยกัน)
9. Nathi Ni (นาทีนี้)
10. Rueang Bon Tiang (เรื่องบนเตียง)
11. Sut Thai (สุดท้าย)

=== 3 to 1 (2006) ===
1. Kho Ang (ข้ออ้าง)
2. Duai Khwam Tem Chai (ด้วยความเต็มใจ)
3. Yu Yang Ngao Ngao (อยู่อย่างเหงาเหงา)
4. Rup Thai Thi Hai Pai (รูปถ่ายที่หายไป)
5. Khon Muean Kan (คนเหมือนกัน)
6. Chai Rai (ใจร้าย)
7. Kwa Cha Bok Rak (กว่าจะบอกรัก)
8. Chan Phrom (ฉันพร้อม)
9. Phut Rueang Di Di (Klua Mai Dang) (พูดเรื่องดี ๆ (กลัวไม่ดัง))
10. Phalang Chiwit (พลังชีวิต)
