= Thailand E-Sports Federation =

Thai e-sports organization

- Abbreviation: TESF
- Formation: 2013, as Thai E-Sports Association; 2017, as Thailand E-Sports Federation
- Purpose: Manage eSports in Thailand
- Location: Bang Kapi, Bangkok
- Region served: Thailand
- Official language: Thai
- President: Santi Lohthong
- Affiliations: Sports Authority of Thailand; International e-Sports Federation
- Website: tesf.or.th

The Thailand E-Sports Federation (TESF, Thai: สมาคมกีฬาอีสปอร์ตแห่งประเทศไทย), previously known as the Thai E-Sports Association (สมาคมไทยอีสปอร์ต), is a Thai body established to manage e-sports in Thailand. It is recognised by the Sports Authority of Thailand and is a member of the International e-Sports Federation.
