= Thitinan Saengnak =

Thai politician (1961–2026)

- ฐิตินันท์ แสงนาค

Member of the House of Representatives of Thailand for Khon Kaen province
- In office 24 March 2019 – 20 March 2023

Personal details
- Born: 17 March 1961 Mueang Khon Kaen district, Thailand
- Died: 5 April 2026 (aged 65) Mueang Khon Kaen district, Thailand
- Party: FFP (2018–2019); BJT (2016–2018)
- Education: Loei Rajabhat University (BA); Ramkhamhaeng University (MBA)
- Occupation: Business manager

Thitinan Saengnak (Thai: ฐิตินันท์ แสงนาค; 17 March 1961 – 5 April 2026) was a Thai politician. A member of the Future Forward Party and the Bhumjaithai Party, he served in the House of Representatives from 2019 to 2023.

Saengnak died by suicide with a self-inflicted gunshot in Mueang Khon Kaen district on 5 April 2026. He was 65, and had recently been diagnosed with liver cancer.
