= Kriang Kalptinan =

Thai politician (1952–2026)

- เกรียง กัลป์ตินันท์
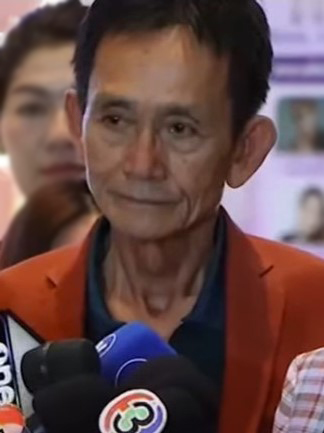
- Kalptinan in 2023

Member of the House of Representatives of Thailand
- In office 14 May 2023 – 12 December 2025
- In office 2 July 1995 – 24 February 2006

Personal details
- Born: 27 November 1952 Mueang Ubon Ratchathani district, Thailand
- Died: 11 August 2026 (aged 73) Bangkok, Thailand
- Party: Democrat (1995–1996); New Aspiration (1996–2000); Thai Rak Thai (2000–2007); People's Power (2007–2008); Pheu Thai (2012–2018, 2018–2026); Thai Raksa Chart (2018)
- Education: Ubon Ratchathani Rajabhat University (BA, MEd)
- Occupation: Military officer

Kriang Kalptinan (Thai: เกรียง กัลป์ตินันท์; 27 November 1952 – 11 August 2026) was a Thai politician. A member of multiple political parties, he served in the House of Representatives from 1995 to 2006 and again from 2023 to 2025.

Kalptinan died in Bangkok on 11 August 2026, at the age of 73.
