= 2026 Narathiwat attack =

Ambush in Narathiwat that killed 5 rangers

Narathiwat attack
- Part of Southern Thailand insurgency
- A map of Narathiwat
- Location: 6.288853°N 101.705872°E; Buketa Sami checkpoint, Narathiwat, Thailand
- Date: 2026 July 22; 6:45 p.m. (Indochina Time)
- Attack type: Shooting, Bombing
- Weapons: Firearms and Pipebombs
- Deaths: 5
- Injuries: 6
- Assailant: Ten assailants
- Accused: "Arsesan"; Mahama Sari

On July 22, Unknown assailants attacked the Buketa Sami checkpoint killing five paramilitary personnel and injuring six others, no group claimed responsibility for the attacks; however, authorities suspected two men responsible for the attack.

== Background ==
The Provinces of Narathiwat, Yala and Pattani are Thailand's only Muslim majority provinces, in those regions an insurgency by Malay insurgents have claimed the lives of 7,000+ people since 2004

Thai spokeswoman, Ratchada Thanadirek stated that in the past two to three months that a series of violent attacks were perpetrated by a "terrorist network seeking to instil fear among the public and target state officials"

A day before the attack occurred, a car explosion occurred in front of a Police station causing minor injuries and property damage

== Attack ==
The attack occurred on 6:45 PM, when unidentified assailants used pipe bombs and firearms during the attack, The attack resulted in the deaths of five Thai rangers while six civilians were wounded, including a ten-year-old boy, a three-year-old girl and a senior citizen, The attack also lasted for ninety seconds before ending after the attack, Emergency teams immediately transported the wounded to hospitals

After the attack, The assailants seized three AK-47 rifles, Three bullet-proof vests and three cellphones from the paramilitary personnel

Government forces reported that the pick-up truck used to transport the assailants was found abandoned and set on fire, 13 miles away from the attack site

== Victims ==
The names of the victims killed were identified as

- Theerayut Somakerd
- Sakiriya Jena
- Wimon Dabthong
- Nattasit Kaewsena
- Salahuding Pi

Names of the Victims injured

- Habib Hina
- Muhammad Ali Abrue
- Farhah Abrue
- Muhammad Hafit Hina
- Awatif Bueraheng

== Aftermath ==
Thai government forces sealed off the checkpoint after the attack and launched investigations to identify the assailants

On July 24, Thai authorities imposed martial law in Narathiwat following the attack as to pursue the assailants, this was issued by Major General Yod-Arwut Phuengpak

Peacetalks with Insurgents in the area were also postponed indefinitely as a result of the attack

== Reactions ==
Thai Prime Minister, Anutin Charnvirakul condemned the attacks calling it a "brazen act of terrorism" and "a serious threat to national security"
