= Pichai Lertpongadisorn =

Thai politician (born 1964)

- พิชัย เลิศพงศ์อดิศร

Chief Executive of Chiang Mai Provincial Administrative Organization
- Incumbent
- Assumed office 20 December 2020
- Preceded by: Boonlert Buranupakorn

Personal details
- Born: 24 March 1964 (age 62) Chiang Mai, Thailand
- Party: Pheu Thai

Pichai Lertpongadisorn (Thai: พิชัย เลิศพงศ์อดิศร, RTGS: Phichai Loetphong-adison) is a Thai politician, currently the chief executive of Chiang Mai Provincial Administrative Organization (PAO) since 2020. He is a member of the Pheu Thai Party.

== 2020 PAO election ==
Pichai was endorsed by former prime minister Thaksin Shinawatra in the Thai 2020 local elections. He ran against and defeated the then-incumbent Chiang Mai PAO Chief Executive Boonlert Buranupakorn who is a member of a prominent Chiang Mai political family.

== 2025 PAO election ==
Pichai was endorsed by Thaksin again for the 2025 PAO chief executive election. He defeated the People's Party candidate Pun-Arj Chairatana.
