= Thongchai Yenprasert =

Thai politician (1955–2026)

Police Colonel Thongchai Yenprasert PM DCh
- ธงชัย เย็นประเสริฐ

Chief Executive of the Nonthaburi Provincial Administrative Organization
- In office 14 March 2004 – 10 August 2026
- Preceded by: Position established
- Succeeded by: Naruphon Yenprasert

Personal details
- Born: 20 February 1955 Tha It, Pak Kret District, Nonthaburi Province, Thailand
- Died: 10 August 2026 (aged 71) Nonthaburi, Thailand
- Cause of death: Assassination
- Spouse: Amornwan Yenprasert
- Domestic partner: Nonglak Norajeen
- Occupation: Politician

Thongchai Yenprasert (Thai: ธงชัย เย็นประเสริฐ; 20 February 1955 – 10 August 2026) was a Thai politician who served as the chief executive of the Nonthaburi Provincial Administrative Organization in 2004 until his assassination.

== Early life and career ==
Thongchai Yenprasert was born on 20 February 1955 in Tha It, Pak Kret District, Nonthaburi Province. He completed his education at Ramkhamhaeng University and earned a Bachelor of Laws degree. He was a member of the 9th Special Police Cadet Class.

He began his political career with a multi-decade tenure in law enforcement before joining the Royal Thai Police in 1984. He served as the Police Legal Division from 1984 to 1988 before joining the elite Crime Suppression Division, where he served from 1988 to 1997. He then served as the Deputy Superintendent of Sai Noi Police Station from 1997 to 1998, Deputy Superintendent of Mueang Nonthaburi Police Station from 1998 to 2000, Superintendent of Bang Bua Thong Police Station from 2000 to 2001, and Superintendent of Pak Kret Police Station from 2001 to 2004. Thongchai then started his government career and was elected in 2004 as the president of the Nonthaburi Provincial Administrative Organization. He then won many re-elections, serving a total of five consecutive terms over more than two decades.

== Death ==
On 10 August 2026, Thongchai was shot multiple times inside of his vehicle during an incident at the Nonthaburi Provincial Administrative Organization office on 11:00 AM local time, former Member of Parliament for Nonthaburi Chalong Riewrang. He was rushed to Phra Nang Klao Hospital, where he was pronounced dead at 2:36 PM. Chalong surrendered to law enforcement at the scene, and preliminary police investigations indicated the shooting stemmed from a personal and financial dispute between the two figures.

== Royal decorations ==
- 2011 – Knight Grand Cross (First Class) of the Most Noble Order of the Crown of Thailand
- 2009 – Knight Commander (Second Class) of the Most Exalted Order of the White Elephant
