= Bunjop Bunnag =

Thai politician (1925–2026)

Bunjop Bunnag (Thai: บรรจบ บุนนาค; 10 December 1925 – 22 January 2026) was a Thai politician.

== Life and career ==
Bunnag was born in the Phra Nakhon district of Bangkok on 10 December 1925. He was active in the Royal Thai Army (1949–1985). He was the minister of defence in 1992.

Bunnag died on 22 January 2026, at the age of 100.
