= Killings of Diana and Roman Nazimova =

2026 murders in Thailand

- Date: July 2026
- Location: Chonburi province, Thailand
- Deaths: 2

Diana Nazimova (Russian: Диана Назимова) and Roman Nazimov (Russian: Роман Назимов) were siblings from Russia living in Thailand. In July 2026, the siblings were killed in Chonburi province, Thailand.

Following the discovery of the siblings' bodies, three more bodies were found, Wichian Wongsa (Thai: วิเชียร วงษา), wife Chantana Chatin (Thai: ฉันทนา ฉัตรอินทร์), and daughter Nichapha Wongsa (Thai: นิชาภา วงษา), a family that had previously been reported missing.

== Background ==
Diana and Roman Nazimova were Russian expatriates living in Chon Buri, Thailand, who moved to live with their mother in 2021. Diana was 22 and Roman was 17. Their mother moved to Pattaya in 2018.

== Murders ==
Diana and Roman were declared missing on 26 July 2026. The siblings' motorcycle was subsequently discovered dismantled and buried in the forest in Tambon Huay Yai.

== Arrests ==
On 31 July 2026, ex-convict Thana Kerdthong, 43, and Thongchai Srinil, 39, were arrested in Wang Sombun district of Sa Kaeo province hiding in a longan orchard. Thana and Thongchai subsequently confessed to shooting Roman and beating Diana to death.

Thana had been released from Rayong Prison on 5 June 2026, seven weeks before the killings. He was serving a seven-year sentence for attempted murder.

Thana and Thongchai were subsequently investigated for the deaths of husband Wichian Wongsa, 53, wife Chantana Chatin, 50, and daughter Nichapha Wongsa, 18, who were reported missing on 27 June 2026. Their bodies were found on 31 July 2026 in a grave near the Nazimova siblings. A murder suspect to alerted police of the other victims is now in witness protection.

Two other men, Chatchanan Paen-aiam and Atsadang Chuwong, were arrested as alleged accomplices to the murders.

On 4 August 2026, Neng, a mechanic, spoke publicly about providing police with information about the Nazimova's motorcycle.

== Reaction ==
Thai Prime Minister Anutin Charnvirakul traveled to Chonburi and issued an apology on 1 August 2026, saying, "I apologise to our Russian brothers and sisters that this happened to Russian people."
