= Provincial administrative organization =

Local government body in Thailand

The Provincial Administrative Organization (PAO) (Thai: องค์การบริหารส่วนจังหวัด, Acronym: อบจ.) is a devolved local government body in Thailand. It is developed from the existing provincial council which provided advices and recommendations on behalf of local people to a centrally-appointed governor. Each province (excluding Bangkok, which is administered by the Bangkok Metropolitan Administration) can have one provincial administrative organization. Due to separation of powers, a provincial administrative organization, headed by a chief executive, and a Provincial Administrative Organization Council (Thai: สภาองค์การบริหารส่วนจังหวัด) are separate bodies that work together. Local elections are held every 4 years to elect the PAO chief executives and council members, the most recent PAO local election was in 2025.

== History ==
=== Early history ===
During 1892 - 1932, Siam (then Thailand) employed a four-level administrative division, like the People's Republic of China today. The country was divided into several provinces (Thai: มณฑล), each of which contained many prefectures (Thai: เมือง/จังหวัด). Each prefecture was subdivided into districts (Thai: อำเภอ) and subdistricts (Thai: ตำบล) respectively. After the Siamese revolution of 1932, all prefectures became provinces in their own right.

In 1938, the Thai government proposed that each province, aside from being run by a centrally-appointed lord lieutenant (Thai: ข้าหลวงประจำจังหวัด) or governor (Thai: ผู้ว่าราชการจังหวัด), must also have an advisory council composed of local people. council provided advice and recommendations to the governor. In addition, the council also acted as an auditor for the province. The council had at least 9 members selected from all districts in that province. Each district was entitled to one councillor. If the population of one district exceeded 30,000, the number of members could be found by dividing the population by 30,000 and take the quotient. However, if the remainder of the division exceeds 15,000, one member was also added. For instance, the district with a population of 80,000 will have [80,000 ÷ 30,000] = 2 councillors. Since the remainder is 20,000, one additional member is needed. Therefore, the overall number of councillor is 2+1 = 3.

=== Mathematical Complexities ===
In 1955, the minimum number of councillor was changed from 9 to 12. The mathematical process of selecting councillors became more complex. If the overall number of councillor was less than 12, an adjusting value is computed by dividing the population of that province by the minimum number of councillor (in this case, 12). All districts in that province were then sorted in terms of their populations. The district that had the highest population got one more councillor. If the overall number of councillors was still less than 12, the population of the latest selected district was subtracted by the adjusting value before the process was repeated. In addition, another class of councillors was selected from local municipalities and other people appointed by the interior minister . One year later, it was realised that there were too few councillors. The minimum number of provincial councillors was raised from 12 to 24. The divisor was dropped from 30,000 to 15,000. If the remainder of the division exceeded 7,500, one more councillor was added.

==== Example of determining the number of councillors in 1956 ====
The province A has a population of 261,000. The adjusting value is [261,000 ÷ 24] = 10,875 The populations of all districts are shown below. If the population was less than 15,000, the number of councillor is one. If, however, the population exceeds 15,000, there is one more member per each 15,000. If the remainder exceeds 75,000, a member is added.

District	Population	Number of Councillors
A	7,500	1
B	12,200	1
C	16,000	1
D	21,000	1
E	9,500	1
F	30,000	2
G	65,000	4
H	82,000	5
I	9,000	1
J	8,800	1
Total	261,000	18

Since the number of councillor is 18, the process repeats 6 more times. All districts are ranked with respect to populations. In the first round, district H get one more councillor. The adjusted population for district H is 82,000- 10,875 = 71,125. The process repeats 5 more times. The population of the selected district is then reduced by the same adjusting value. The whole process can be shown below.

Round 1		Round 2		Round 3	
District	Population	District	Population	District	Population
H	82,000	H	71,125	G	65,000
G	65,000	G	65,000	H	60,250
F	30,000	F	30,000	F	30,000
D	21,000	D	21,000	D	21,000
C	16,000	C	16,000	C	16,000
B	12,200	B	12,200	B	12,200
E	9,500	E	9,500	E	9,500
I	9,000	I	9,000	I	9,000
J	8,800	J	8,800	J	8,800
A	7,500	A	7,500	A	7,500

Round 4		Round 5		Round 6	
District	Population	District	Population	District	Population
H	60,250	G	54,125	H	49,375
G	54,125	H	49,375	G	43,250
F	30,000	F	30,000	F	30,000
D	21,000	D	21,000	D	21,000
C	16,000	C	16,000	C	16,000
B	12,200	B	12,200	B	12,200
E	9,500	E	9,500	E	9,500
I	9,000	I	9,000	I	9,000
J	8,800	J	8,800	J	8,800
A	7,500	A	7,500	A	7,500

To sum up, districts H and G have 6 and 2 more councillors. The numbers are added in the preceding table.

=== Simplification and Reformation ===
In 1967, the government led by Thanom Kittikachorn proposed that the number of councillors depended on the population of that province, that is:

Population	Number of councillors
Up to 199,999	18
200,000 - 499,999	24
500,000 - 999,999	30
1,000,000 and greater	36

Kittikachorn's government also simplified the process of selecting councillors. Each district was entitled to one councillor. If the overall number of councillors was below the minimum number according to the table above, all districts were sorted. The district that has the maximum population received one more councillor. If the overall number of councillors was still below the minimum number, the population of latest selected district would be reduced by the adjustment value before ranking all districts again. The adjusting value was calculated by dividing the population of that province by the relevant minimum number of councillors.

In 1997, Thailand introduced the new constitution written by delegates of its people. The provincial administrative organization was introduced as a separate body from the provincial council, but the work closely with each other. The provincial administrative organization is managed by the president, who was expected to be a replacement of the centrally-appointed governor. The council is chaired by one of its member and is expected to provide advices, recommendations and plans to the president. The number of provincial councillors, like Kittikachorn's government, depends on the population as shown in the table below.

Population	Number of councillors
Up to 499,999	24
500,000 - 999,999	30
1,000,000 - 1,499,999	36
1,500,000 - 1,999,999	42
2,000,000 and greater	48

==== Example of determining the number of councillors in 1997 and onwards ====
Due to the simplification of process, the process of determining the number of councillors involves only ranking and adjusting the population. Province A initially has 10 councillors. The required number is 24, so there must be 24-10 = 14 rounds of ranking and adjusting. Once the ranking is completed, the district with the highest number of people is selected. The selected district then has its population adjusted before the process repeats. The determination process can be show below.

Round 1		Round 2		Round 3		Round 4		Round 5		Round 6	
District	Population	District	Population	District	Population	District	Population	District	Population	District	Population
H	82,000	H	71,125	G	65,000	H	60,250	G	54,125	H	49,375
G	65,000	G	65,000	H	60,250	G	54,125	H	49,375	G	43,250
F	30,000	F	30,000	F	30,000	F	30,000	F	30,000	F	30,000
D	21,000	D	21,000	D	21,000	D	21,000	D	21,000	D	21,000
C	16,000	C	16,000	C	16,000	C	16,000	C	16,000	C	16,000
B	12,200	B	12,200	B	12,200	B	12,200	B	12,200	B	12,200
E	9,500	E	9,500	E	9,500	E	9,500	E	9,500	E	9,500
I	9,000	I	9,000	I	9,000	I	9,000	I	9,000	I	9,000
J	8,800	J	8,800	J	8,800	J	8,800	J	8,800	J	8,800
A	7,500	A	7,500	A	7,500	A	7,500	A	7,500	A	7,500

Round 7		Round 8		Round 9		Round 10		Round 11		Round 12	
District	Population	District	Population	District	Population	District	Population	District	Population	District	Population
G	43,250	H	38,500	G	32,375	F	30,000	H	27,625	G	21,500
H	38,500	G	32,375	F	30,000	H	27,625	G	21,500	D	21,000
F	30,000	F	30,000	H	27,625	G	21,500	D	21,000	F	19,125
D	21,000	D	21,000	D	21,000	D	21,000	F	19,125	H	16,750
C	16,000	C	16,000	C	16,000	C	16,000	C	16,000	C	16,000
B	12,200	B	12,200	B	12,200	B	12,200	B	12,200	B	12,200
E	9,500	E	9,500	E	9,500	E	9,500	E	9,500	E	9,500
I	9,000	I	9,000	I	9,000	I	9,000	I	9,000	I	9,000
J	8,800	J	8,800	J	8,800	J	8,800	J	8,800	J	8,800
A	7,500	A	7,500	A	7,500	A	7,500	A	7,500	A	7,500

Round 13		Round 14	
District	Population	District	Population
D	21,000	F	19,125
F	19,125	H	16,750
H	16,750	C	16,000
C	16,000	B	12,200
B	12,200	G	10,625
G	10,625	D	10,125
E	9,500	E	9,500
I	9,000	I	9,000
J	8,800	J	8,800
A	7,500	A	7,500

As a conclusion, districts H and G have 6+7 = 7 and 5+1=6 councillors respectively. Districts D and F have 2 provincial councillors. Each of other districts is entitled to 1 councillor.

== Election ==
Eligible citizens aged 18 or over whose registered address is within the province separately elect (1) the chief executive of the provincial administrative organization (executive branch) and (2) the provincial administrative organization council members (legislative branch). Councillor candidates are selected according to the number determined by population of that district. President is selected on a first past the post basis. The candidate with most votes becomes the president. The elected president selects two to four vice presidents and up to five assistants, all of whom must not be the council member.

The legislation has been put forward to gradually increase the power and responsibilities of the provincial administration organization. Some responsibilities, however, remain with the centrally-appointed provincial governor. This implies that Thailand employed two-level local administration. The first level is a local government, including municipalities, subdistrict administrative organizations and provincial administrative organizations. All of these bodies are headed by an elected president. The second level is a regional branch of the central government, headed by the governor.

== Future ==
Move Forward Party and its predecessor, Future Forward Party, proposed that the two-tiered local administration in Thailand, including the branch of the central government (or the regional government) and the local self-governing government, be completely reformed. They suggested that the regional government should be dissolved and the governor of each province should be elected and take the role of the president of the provincial administrative organization. This effectively shorten the chain of command from the central government to the local government. All public services, except for judiciary and military, will be managed by local governments. If the proposal was successful, all provinces will be led by an elected (rather than centrally-appointed) governor who are overseen and advised by an elected provincial council. The provincial administration organization will become an integral part of the province itself.

== Roles ==
A Provincial Administrative Organization (P.A.O.) provides a multitude of public services and duties within its jurisdiction, including:

1. Enact by-laws in accordance with existing acts.
2. Create a plan for local development.
3. Coordinate and work with other local bodies for the benefits of citizens.
4. Work with police and other government bodies in peacekeeping and policing.
5. Maintain and promote local arts, traditions and cultures.
6. Promote and support education.
7. Work on behalf of the regional government.

== See also ==
- Administrative divisions of Thailand
- Provinces of Thailand
